= Emslie =

Emslie is a surname. Notable people with the surname include:

- Alfred Edward Emslie (1848–1918), British painter and photographer
- Bob Emslie (1859–1943), Canadian baseball pitcher
- Claire Emslie (born 1994), Scottish footballer
- David Emslie (born 1955), South African cricketer
- Derek Emslie, Lord Kingarth (born 1949), Scottish judge
- Erik Emslie (born 1965), South African cricketer
- George Emslie, Baron Emslie (1919–2002), Scottish judge
- Howard Emslie (1922–1985), South African cricketer
- Isabel Emslie Hutton (1887–1960), Scottish doctor
- John Emslie (1813–1875), British cartographer and artist
- John Philipps Emslie (1839–1913), British topographical artist and folklorist
- Nigel Emslie, Lord Emslie (born 1947), Scottish judge
- Paul Emslie (born 1988), Scottish footballer
- Peter Emslie (born 1968), South African cricketer
- Rosalie Emslie (1891–1977), British painter
- Rosalie M. Emslie (1854–1932), British painter
- William Emslie (1908–1969), Scottish rugby union player
