= B. Hick and Sons =

1833–2002 British engineering company

Hick, Hargreaves & Co.
- Type: General partnership
- Industry: Engineering; Heavy industry
- Predecessor: B. Hick & Son
- Founded: 10 April 1833
- Founder: Benjamin Hick
- Defunct: 2002
- Fate: Reduced to shell company
- Successor: Hick, Hargreaves & Co. Ltd.
- Headquarters: Soho Iron Works, Crook Street, Bolton, United Kingdom
- Number of locations: 2
- Key people: John Hargreaves Jr; John Hick; George Henry Corliss; William Hick; William Hargreaves; William Inglis; Robert Lüthy; Benjamin Hick; John Henry Hargreaves; Wyndham D'arcy Madden; George Arrowsmith
- Number of employees: 1000 (1894); 600 (1961); 350 (1990)

B. Hick & Sons, subsequently Hick, Hargreaves & Co, was a British engineering company based at the Soho Ironworks in Bolton, England. Benjamin Hick, a partner in Rothwell, Hick and Rothwell, later Rothwell, Hick & Co., set up the company in partnership with two of his sons, John (1815–1894) and Benjamin Jr (1818–1845) in 1833.

== Locomotives ==
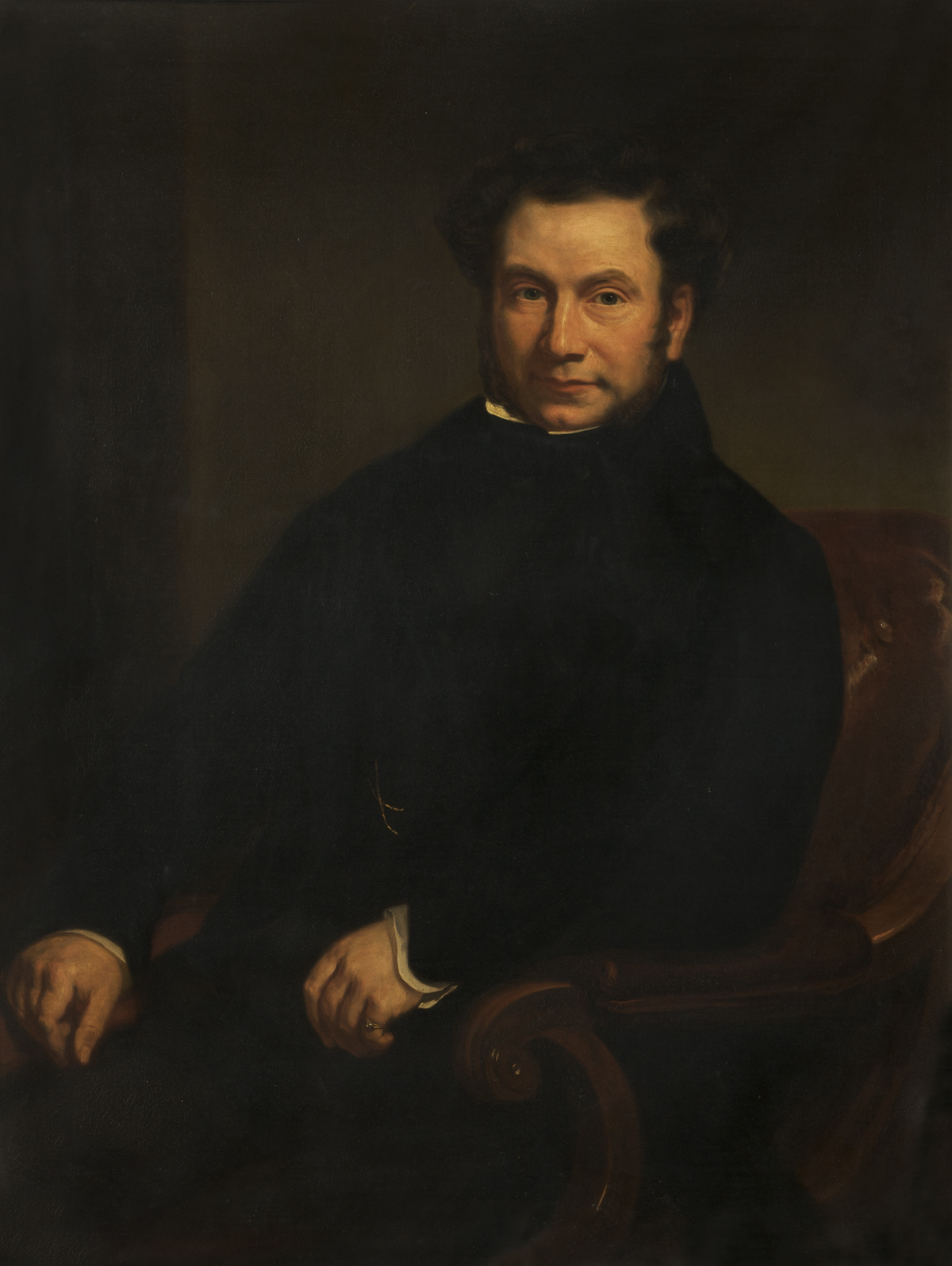
Portrait c.1840 of Benjamin Hick, founder of B. Hick & Sons by George Patten ARA (1801–1865)

The company's first steam locomotive Soho, named after the works was a 0-4-2 goods type, built in 1833 for carrier John Hargreaves. In 1834 an unconventional, gear-driven four-wheeled rail carriage was conceived for Bolton solicitor and banker, Thomas Lever Rushton (1810–1883). The engine was the first 3-cylinder locomotive and its design incorporated turned iron wheel rims with aerodynamic plate discs as an alternative to conventional spokes. The 3-cylinder concept evolved into Hick's experimental horizontal boiler A 2-2-2 locomotive about 1840, adopting the principle features of the vertical boiler engine. The A 2-2-2 design appears not to have been put into production.

More locomotives were built over the 1830s, some for export to the United States including a 2-2-0 Fulton for the Pontchartrain Railroad in 1834, New Orleans and Carrollton for the St. Charles Streetcar Line in New Orleans in 1835 and a second New Orleans for the same line in 1837. A 10 hp stationary engine was supplied to the Carrollton Railroad Company in Jefferson Parish, Louisiana, for ironworking purposes, but damaged by fire in 1838. Two 0-4-0 tender locomotives Potomak and Louisa were delivered to the Fredericksburg and Potomac Railroad and a third, Virginia to the Raleigh and Gaston Railroad in North Carolina during 1836.

Between 1837 and 1840 the company subcontracted for Edward Bury and Company, supplying engines to the Midland Counties Railway, London and Birmingham Railway, North Union Railway, Manchester and Leeds Railway and indirectly to the Grand Crimean Central Railway via the London and North Western Railway in 1855. Engines were built for the Taff Vale Railway, Edinburgh and Glasgow Railway, Cheshire, Lancashire and Birkenhead Railway, Chester and Birkenhead Railway, Eastern Counties Railway, Liverpool and Manchester Railway, North Midland Railway, Paris and Versailles Railway and Bordeaux Railway.

In 1841 the Birmingham and Gloucester Railway successfully used American Norris 4-2-0 locomotives on the notorious Lickey Incline and Hick built three similar locomotives for the line. Between 1844 and 1846 the firm built a number of "long boiler" locomotives with haystack fireboxes and in 1848, four 2-4-0s for the North Staffordshire Railway. In the same year, the company built Chester, probably the earliest known prototype of a 6-wheel coupled 0-6-0} goods locomotive.

== Aerodynamic disc wheel ==
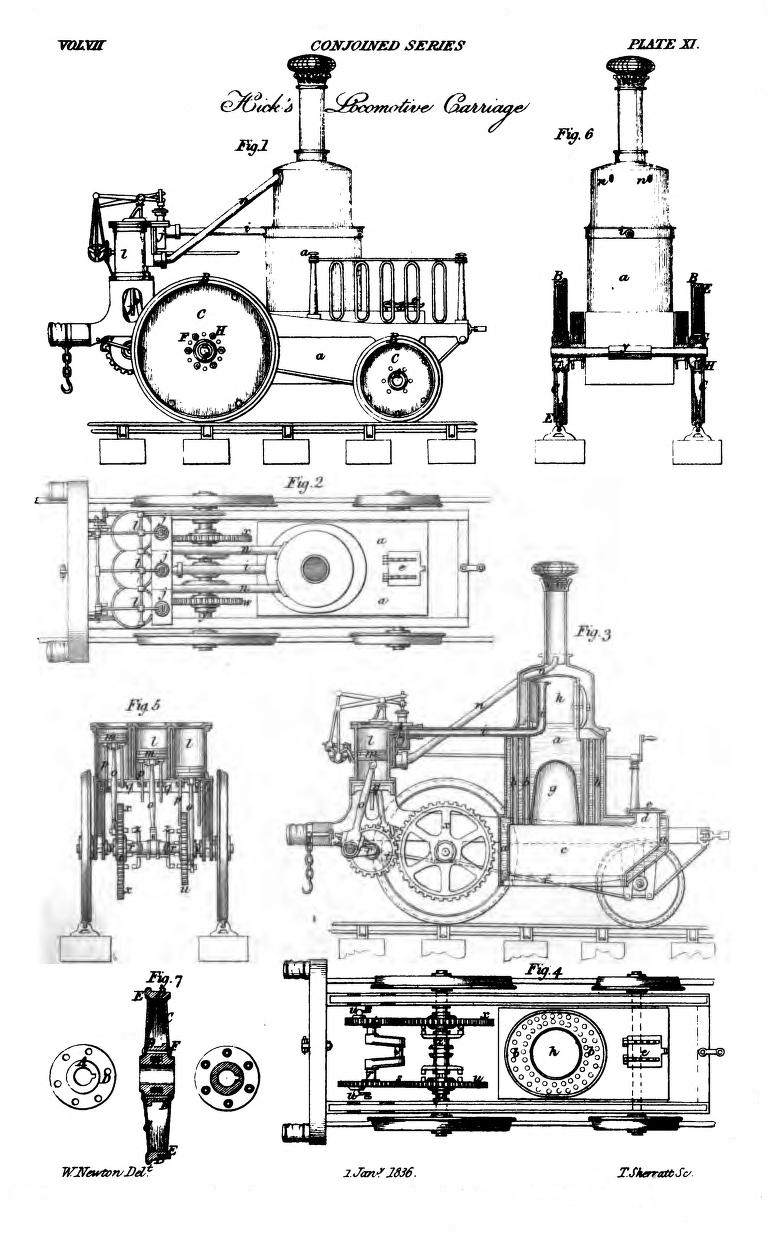
Drawing of Benjamin Hick's patent 3-cylinder steam-carriage and disc wheel from Newton's London Journal of Arts and Sciences, 1836.

Benjamin Hick's wheel design was used on a number of Great Western Railway engines including what may have been the world's first streamlined locomotive; an experimental prototype, nicknamed Grasshoper, driven by Brunel at 100 miles per hour (160 km/h), c.1847. The 10 ft disc wheels from GWR locomotive Ajax were lent to convey the statue of the Duke of Wellington to Hyde Park Corner in London.

Hick's patent extended the purpose of the design from the locomotive steam-carriage, '...I do not confine myself to this adaptation. Wheels for carts, waggons, coaches, timber carriages, and for many other uses, may be advantageously constructed on this principle. The forms, dimensions, nature, and strength of material of the naves, discs, and fellies, as well as the mode of uniting the different parts, may be varied, in order to suit the particular purpose for which the wheels are required, and to the wear and tear to which they are liable'.

Examples using wood paneling as streamlining to prevent air turbulence are applied to the 16 ft, 7 ton flywheel and rope races of a Hick Hargreaves and Co. 120hp non-condensing Corliss engine, Caroline installed new at Gurteen's textile manufactorary, Chauntry Mills, Haverhill, Suffolk in 1879.

Disc wheels and wheel fairings have been used for armoured cars, aviation, drag racing, land speed record attempts, land speed racing, motor racing, motor scooters, motorcycle speedway, wheelchair racing, icetrack cycling, velomobiles and bicycle racing, particularly track cycling, track bikes and time trials.

== Engineering drawings ==
Exhibition catalogue of Hick Hargreaves early locomotive drawings, 1974.

Hick Hargreaves collection of early locomotive and steam engine drawings represents one of the finest of its kind in the world. The majority were produced by Benjamin Hick senior and John Hick between 1833-1855, they are of significant interest for their technical detail, fine draughtsmanship and artistic merit. The elaborate finish and harmonious colouring extends from the largest drawings for prospective customers to ordinary working drawings and records for the engineer.

Works like this influenced the contemporary illustrators of popular science and technology of the time like John Emslie (1813-1875), their aesthetic quality stems from a romantic outlook in which science and poetry were partners. Drawings for machinary and fittings 1855-1878, supplied to Waltham Abbey Royal Gunpowder Mills and Woolwich Arsenal are also noted for their quality.

The collections are held by Bolton Metropolitan Borough Archives and the Transport Trust, University of Surrey.

== Hick, Hargreaves & Co ==
After the death of Benjamin Hick in 1842, the firm continued as Benjamin Hick & Son under the management of his eldest son, John Hick; his second son, Benjamin Jr left the company after a year of its founding for partnership in a Liverpool company about 1834, possibly George Forrester & Co. In 1840 he filed a patent governor for B. Hick & Son using an Egyptian winged motif, that featured on the front page of Mechanics' Magazine. Hick's third and youngest son William (1820–1844) served as an apprentice millwright, engineer in the company from 1834 and a 'fitter' from 1837, he was listed as an iron founder in 1843 with his eldest brother John, but died the next year, nine months after receiving his indentures.

In 1845 John Hick took his brother-in-law John Hargreaves Jr (1800–1874) into partnership followed by Hargreaves' youngest brother William (1821–1889) in 1847. John Hargreaves Jr left the firm in April 1850 before buying Silwood Park in Berkshire.

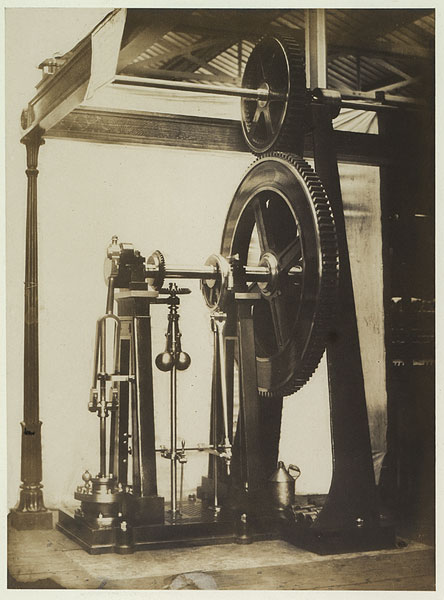
B. Hick & Son 6 hp steam engine, mill-gear and ornamental column at the Great Exhibition. Photograph 1851 by Claude-Marie Ferrier (1811–1889) from the Reports of the Juries.

The following year B. Hick & Son exhibited engineering models and machinery at The Great Exhibition in Class VI. Manufacturing Machines and Tools, including a 6 horse power crank overhead engine and mill-gear driving Hibbert, Platt and Sons' cotton machinery and a 2 hp high-pressure oscillating engine driving a Ryder forging machine. Both engines were modelled in the Egyptian Style. The company received a Council Medal award for its mill gearing, radial drill mandrils and portable forges. The B. Hick & Son London office was at 1 New Broad Street in the City.

One of the Great Exhibition models, a 1:10 scale 1840 double beam engine built in the Egyptian style for John Marshall's Temple Works in Leeds, is displayed at the Science Museum and considered to be the ultimate development of a Watt engine. A second model, apparently built by John Hick and probably shown at the Great Exhibition, is the open ended 3-cylinder A 2-2-2 locomotive on display at Bolton Museum. Bolton Museum holds the best collection of Egyptian cotton products outside the British Museum as a result of the company's strong exports, particularly to Egypt. Leeds Industrial Museum houses a Benjamin Hick & Son beam engine in the Egyptian style c.1845, used for hoisting machinery at the London Road warehouse of the Manchester, Sheffield and Lincolnshire Railway.

Locomotive building continued until 1855, and in all some ninety to a hundred locomotives were produced; but they were a sideline for the company, which concentrated on marine and stationary engines, of which they made a large number.

B. Hick & Son supplied engines for the paddle frigates Dom Afonso by Thomas Royden & Sons and Amazonas by the leading shipbuilder in Liverpool, Thomas Wilson & Co. also builders of the Royal William; the screw propelled Mediterranean steamers, SS Nile and Orontes and the SS Don Manuel built by Alexander Denny and Brothers of Dumbarton. The Brazilian Navy's Afonso rescued passengers from the Ocean Monarch in 1848 and took part in the Battle of The Tonelero Pass in 1851; the Amazonas participated in the Battle of Riachuelo in 1865.

The company made blowing engines for furnaces and smelters, boilers, weighing machines, water wheels and mill machinery. Under the direction of Capt. Roger Stewart Beatson, RE, it supplied machinery "on a new and perfectly unique" concept including engine and boilers, together with iron pillars to the design of Gottfried Semper, with roofing and fittings, for the steam-driven pulp and paper mill at Woolwich Arsenal in 1856. The mill made cartridge bags at the rate of about 20,000 per hour, sufficient to supply the entire British Army and Navy. The intention was to manufacture paper for various departments of Her Majesty's service.

Steel boilers were first produced in 1863, mostly of the Lancashire type, and more than 200 locomotive boilers were made for torpedo boats into the 1890s. The Phoenix Boiler Works were purchased in 1891 to meet an increase in demand. Bolton Steam Museum hold a 1906 Hick, Hargreaves and Co. Ltd. Lancashire boiler front-plate, previously installed at Halliwell Mills, Bolton.

The company introduced the highly efficient Corliss valve gear into the United Kingdom from the United States in about 1864 and was closely identified with it thereafter; William Inglis being responsible for promoting the high speed Corliss engine. In the same year Swiss engineer Robert Lüthy came to the firm from L. and L.R. Bodmer. An early horizontal Corliss type built in 1866, arrived in Australia the following year for Bell's Creek gold mine, Araluan, New South Wales; the engine is now housed at Goulburn Historic Waterworks Museum. A 50 hp Inglis and Spencer improved Corliss girder bed engine built in 1873 (No. 303), used to power Gamble's lace factory, Nottingham and an 1879 (No. 519), 120 hp non-condensing Corliss engine with Inglis and Spencer patent double clip trip gear are held at Forncett Industrial Steam Museum and Gurteen's textile manufactorary and museum, Haverhill, Suffolk. In 1888 this engine powered the largest room of its kind in the United Kingdom with over 400 sewing machines and a specially designed cutting out machine for the massed production of garments. Gurteen's engine is the only example of the type to remain in its original site.

About 1881 Hick, Hargreaves received orders for two Corliss engines of 3000 hp, the largest cotton mill engines in the world. Hargreaves and Inglis trip gear was first applied to a large single cylinder 1800 hp Corliss engine at Eagley Mills near Bolton and the company received a Gold Medal for its products at the 1885 International Inventions Exhibition. An 1886 Hick, Hargreaves and Co. inverted, vertical single cylinder Corliss engine with Inglis and Spencer trip gear, used to run Ford Ayrton and Co.'s spinning mill, Bentham until 1966 is preserved under glass at Bolton Town Centre.

Lüthy was appointed superintendent of hydraulic apparatus in 1870, about August 1883 he went on business to Australia connected with the shipping of frozen meat and to inspect machinery for a large freezing establishment, but died suddenly on 3 July 1884, the day after he returned home.

Mill gearing was a speciality including large flywheels for rope drives, one example of 128 tons being 32 ft in diameter and groved for 56 ropes. Turbines and hydraulic machinery were also manufactured. Many of the tools were to suit the specialist work, with travelling cranes to take 15 to 40 tons in weight, a large lathe, side planer, slotting machine, pit planer and a tool for turning four 32 ft rope flywheels simultaneously. The workshops featured an 80ton hydraulic riveting machine. For the ease of shipping and transportation, Soho Iron Works had its own railway system, traversed by sidings of the London North Western Railway (LNWR). Inglis, who lived in Bolton was a neighbour of LNWR's chief mechanical engineer, Francis Webb.

The company was renamed Hick, Hargreaves and Company in 1867; John Hick retired from the business in 1868 when he became a member of parliament (MP), leaving William Hargreaves as the sole proprietor. On the death of John Hick's nephew Benjamin Hick in 1882, a "much respected member of the firm", active involvement of the Hick family ceased. William Hargreaves died in 1889 and, under the directorship of his three sons, John Henry, Frances and Percy, the business became a private limited company in 1892. In 1893 the founder's great grandson, also Benjamin Hick started an apprenticeship, followed by his younger brother Geoffrey about 1900.

== Diversification ==
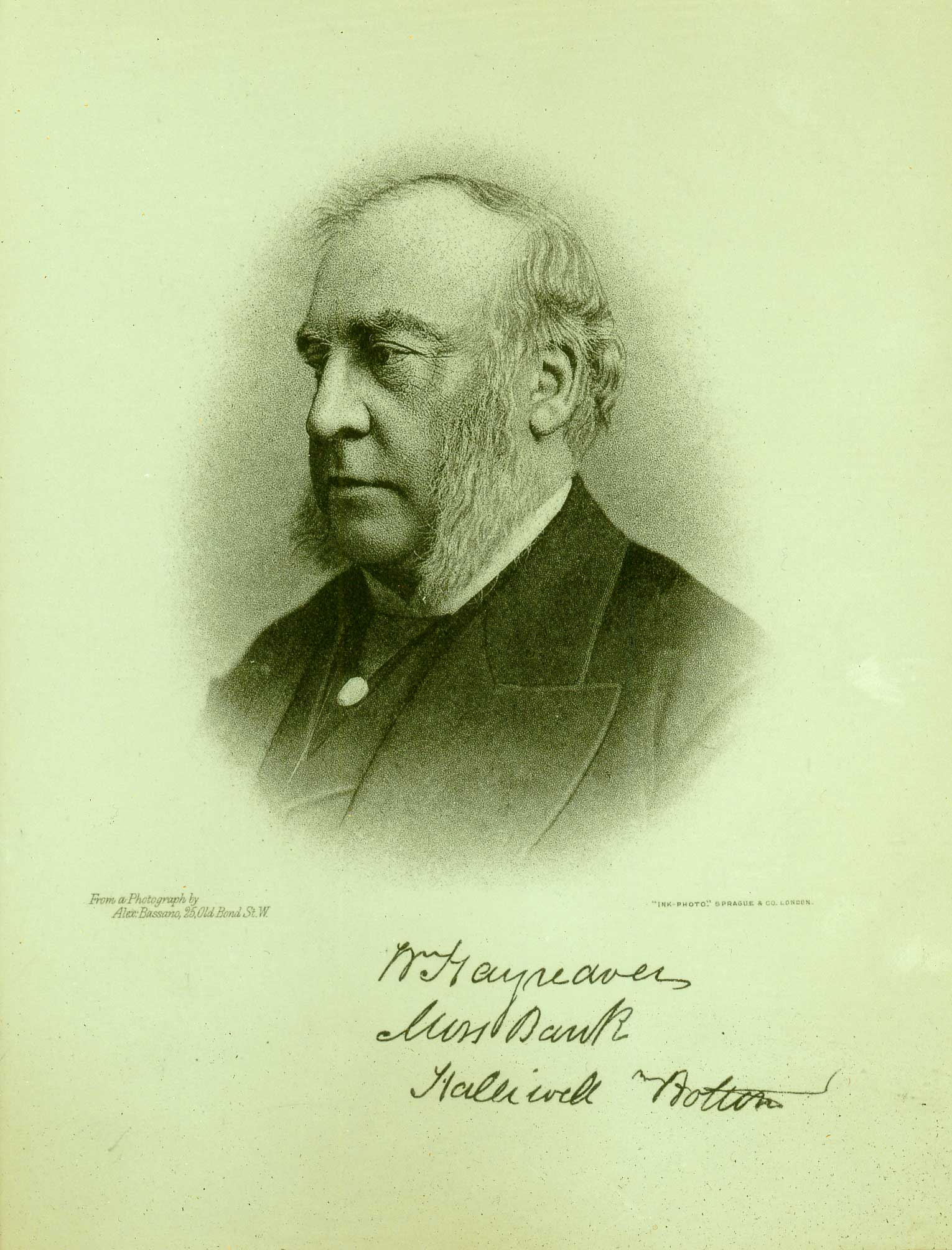
Entrepreneur, William Hargreaves JP c.1880, from a Photograph by Alex Bassano 25 Old Bond St. W. "Ink-Photo." Sprague & Co. London. Inscribed Mr Hargreaves Moss Bank Halliwell Bolton

About 1885 Hick Hargreaves & Co became associated with Sebastian Ziani de Ferranti during the reconstruction of the Grosvenor Gallery and began to manufacture steam engines for power generation including those of Ferranti's Deptford Power Station, the largest power station in the world at the time.

In 1908, the company was licensed to build uniflow engines. From 1911, the company began the manufacture of large diesel engines; however, these did not prove successful and were eventually discontinued. Boiler production finished in 1912. During World War I the company was involved in war work, producing 9.2 inch then 6 inch shells for the Ministry of Munitions, mines and a contract with Vickers to produce marine oil engines for submarines, under licence for the Admiralty.

In the early hours 26 September 1916, the works were targeted by Zeppelin L 21; a bomb missed, passing instead through the roof of the nearby Holy Trinity Church.

The company's recoil gear for the Vickers 18 pounder quick firing gun was so successful that, by war's end, a significant part of the factory was devoted to its production. Civil manufacture was not suspended entirely and in 1916 the firm began making Hick-Bréguet two-stage steam jet air ejectors and high vacuum condensing plant for power generation, including a contract with Yorkshire Electric Power Company. Hick Hargreaves production greatly expanded as centralised power generation was adopted in Great Britain, by the formation of the Central Electricity Board (CEB) in 1926.

In the search for new markets after the war the firm invested in machinery to produce petrol engines and other car components, entering a contract with Vulcan Motor & Engineering Co of Southport for 1000 20 hp petrol engines, but work discontinued in 1922 when Vulcan became bankrupt, with only 150 completed.

Following the arrival of electrical engineer Wyndham D'arcy Madden from Stothert & Pitt in 1919, Hick Hargreaves was re-organised to include a sales department responsible for advertising, supervised by Madden who in succession was appointed Managing Director in 1922, serving until 1963.

Trained at Faraday House Engineering College, from outside the Hargreaves family circle and established conventions of the industrial regions, Madden ensured the business was run economically during the difficult times ahead. The readiness to adapt was crucial to success during the interwar period; he realised that marketing the firm's specialities were as important to the design and manufacture of its products.

As the steam turbine replaced reciprocating steam engines, the company required a skilled engineer to produce a design of its own; in 1923 former principal assistant to the Chief Turbine Designer of English Electric, George Arrowsmith was appointed as Hick Hargreaves' Chief Turbine Designer; development continued and by 1927 the firm's engine work was principally steam turbines for electricity generating stations, becoming a major supplier to the CEB. Three of the nine turbines produced were supplied to Fraser & Chalmers for installation at Ham Halls power station. Arrowsmith was appointed Chief Engineer and a director of Hick Hargreaves in 1928. A 1923 Hick Hargreaves Co. Ltd. condenser, coupled to an English Electric Company turbogenerator built by Dick, Kerr & Co., set No. 6 in operation at the Back o' th' Bank power station, Bolton until 1979, is displayed at the Museum of Science and Industry, Manchester.

During the 1930s, the company acquired the records, drawings, and patterns of four defunct steam engine manufacturers: J & E Wood, John Musgrave & Sons Limited, Galloways Limited and Scott & Hodgson Limited. As a consequence it made a lucrative business out of repairs and the supply of spare parts during the Great Depression. Large stationary steam engines were still used for the many cotton mills in the Bolton area until the collapse of the industry after World War II.

3 and 4-cylinder triple expansion marine steam engines were built during the 1940s, post-war the company expanded its work in electricity generation, again becoming a major supplier to the CEB and branched out into food processing, oil refining and offshore oil equipment production, continuing to supply vacuum equipment to the chemical and petrochemical industries. Between 1946 and 1947 it supplied vacuum pumps to Vickers Armstrongs for the Barnes Wallis designed Stratosphere Chamber at Brooklands, built to investigate high-speed flight at very high altitudes.

By the early 1960's Hick Hargreaves established itself in the practical application of nuclear energy, supplying de-aerating equipment for the early atomic power stations at Calder Hall, Chapelcross and Dounreay, and the complete feed heating system, condensing plant and steam dump condensers for Hunterston. The company received orders for the ejectors, de-aerators and dump condensers for the prototype advanced gas cooled reactor at Windscale and a commission to design the condensing plants and feed systems for the first 175.000 KW Japanese Atomic Power Station at Tokai Mura.

About 1969 the firm's 1930s corporate identity was brought up to date with a logo, while Madden's established and successful marketing of specialities continued; during 1974 Hick Hargreaves promoted its achievements and support of industrial archaeology with an exhibition of B. Hick & Son locomotive drawings, emphasising its response to changing industrial developments since the nineteenth century.

In 2000, Hick Hargreaves' products included compressors, blowers, refrigeration equipment, deaerators, vacuum ejectors and liquid ring vacuum pumps.

In 2002, new owners BOC Limited decided to wind the company's operations down and cease trading while maintaining the company to protect the Hick Hargreaves name.

== Soho Iron Works ==
Between the 1840s and 1870s, the firm had its own Brass Band, "John Hick's Esq, Band," known as the Soho Iron Works Band with a uniform of "... rich full braided coat, black trousers, with two-inch gold lace down the sides and blue cap with gold band," who would play airs through the streets of Bolton.

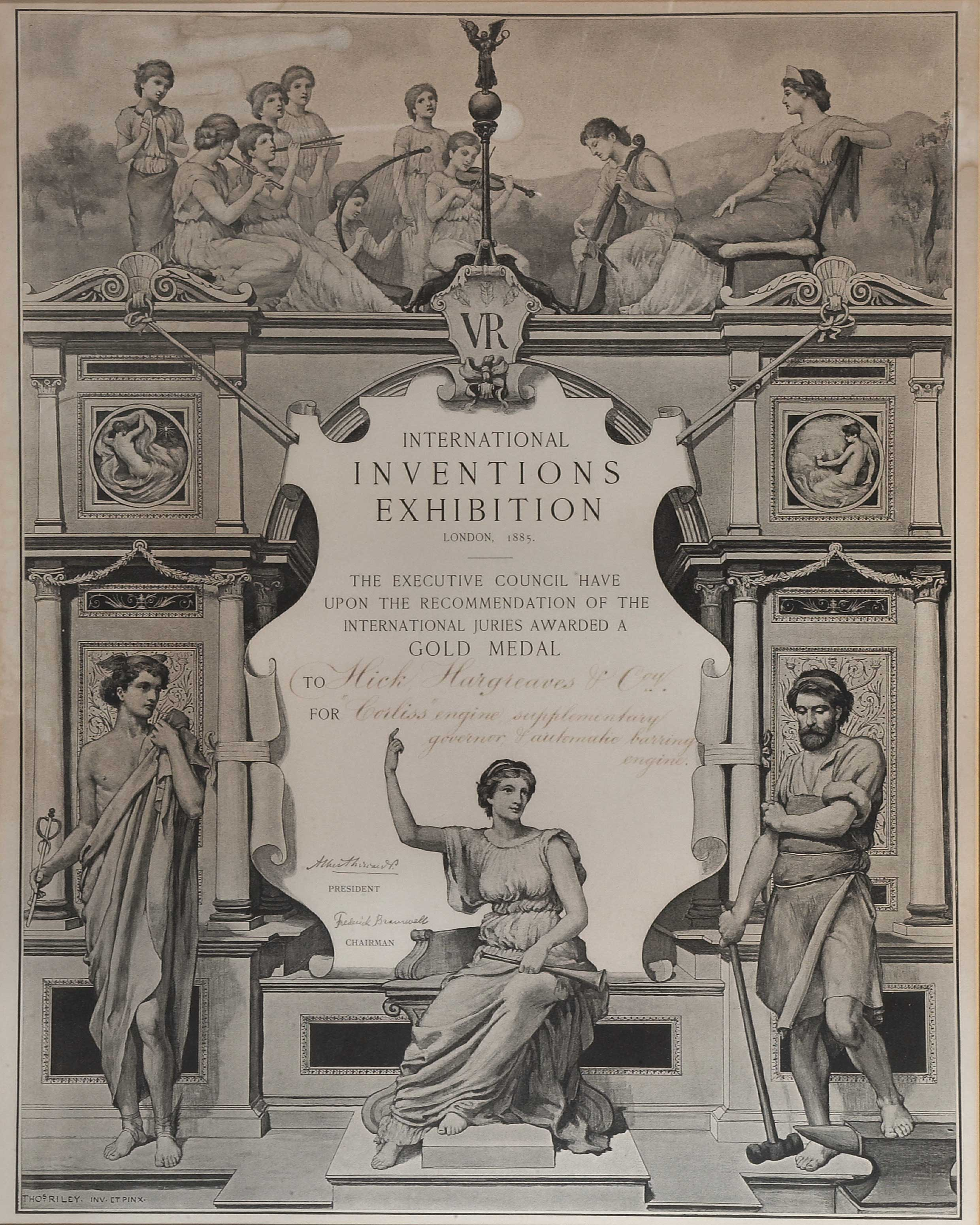
Gold Medal certificate awarded to Hick, Hargreaves and Co. at the International Inventions Exhibition 1885 for their Corliss engine supplementary governor & automatic barring engine. signed by the Prince of Wales and Frederick Bramwell.

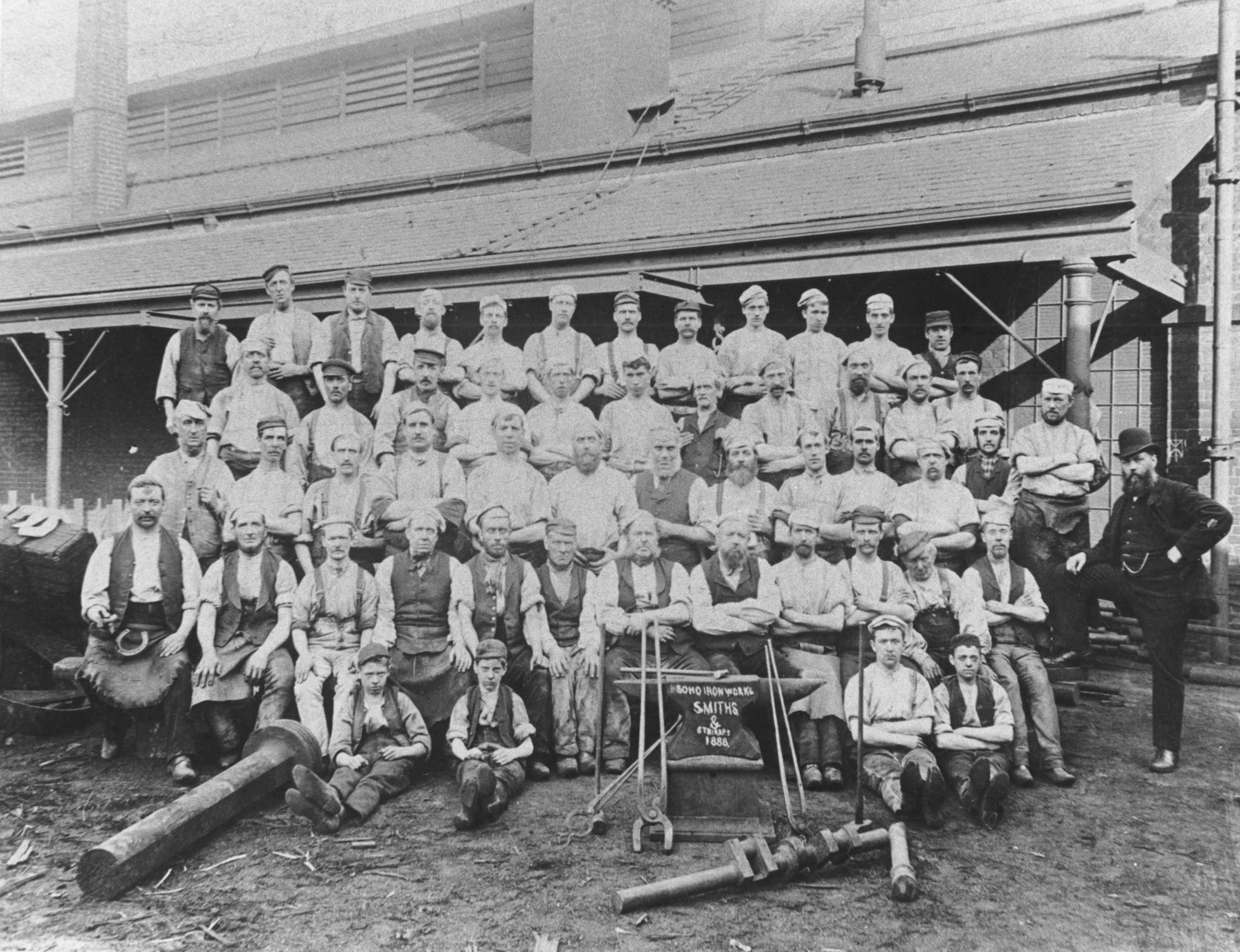
Hick Hargreaves & Co. smiths and strikers with a forman 1888. An anvil and crankshaft in the foreground.

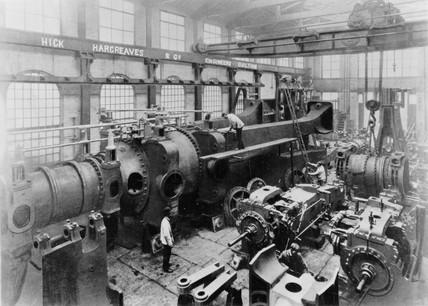
Under assembly c.1890, half of one of the two 10,000 hp engines completed for Deptford Power Station at Hick, Hargreaves and Co. A travelling crane and hoist above.

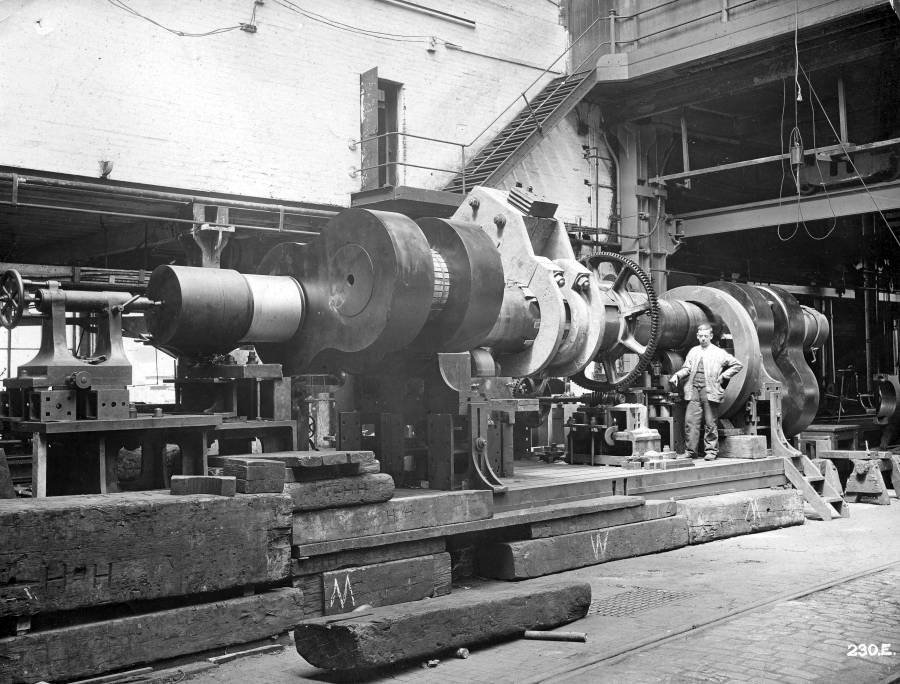
Finishing the ends of a crankshaft after building; an improvised lathe for machining a large steam engine crankshaft, 1900 with a worm and wheel for turning the shaft in the centre. In the background on the far right is a screw cutting machine.

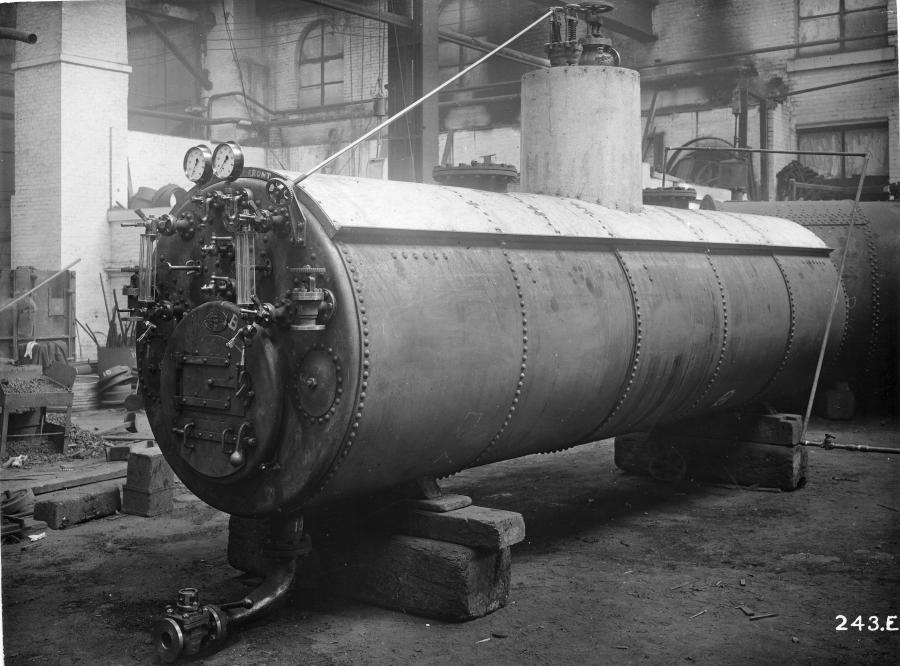

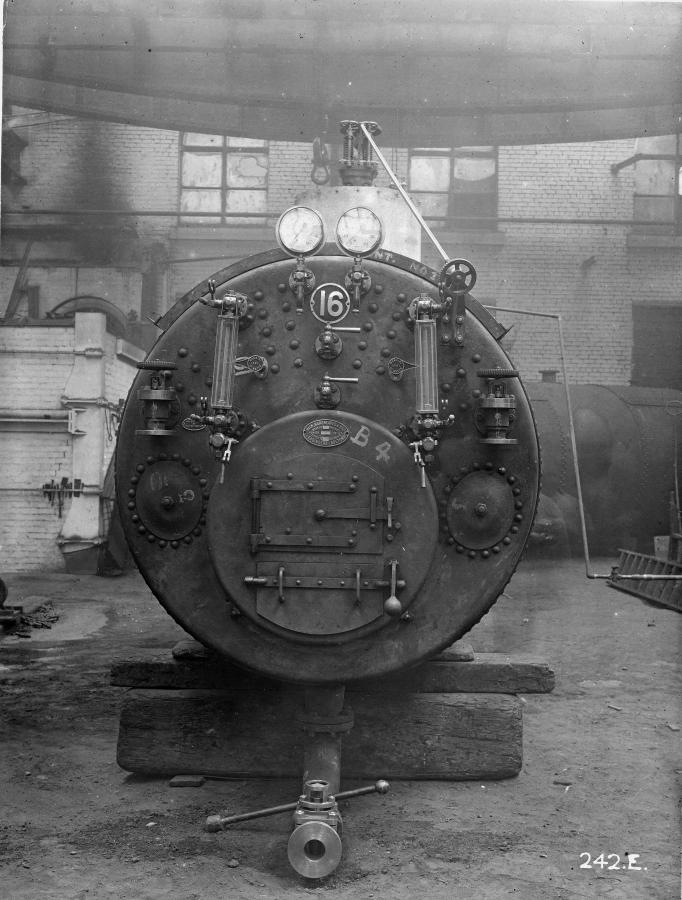

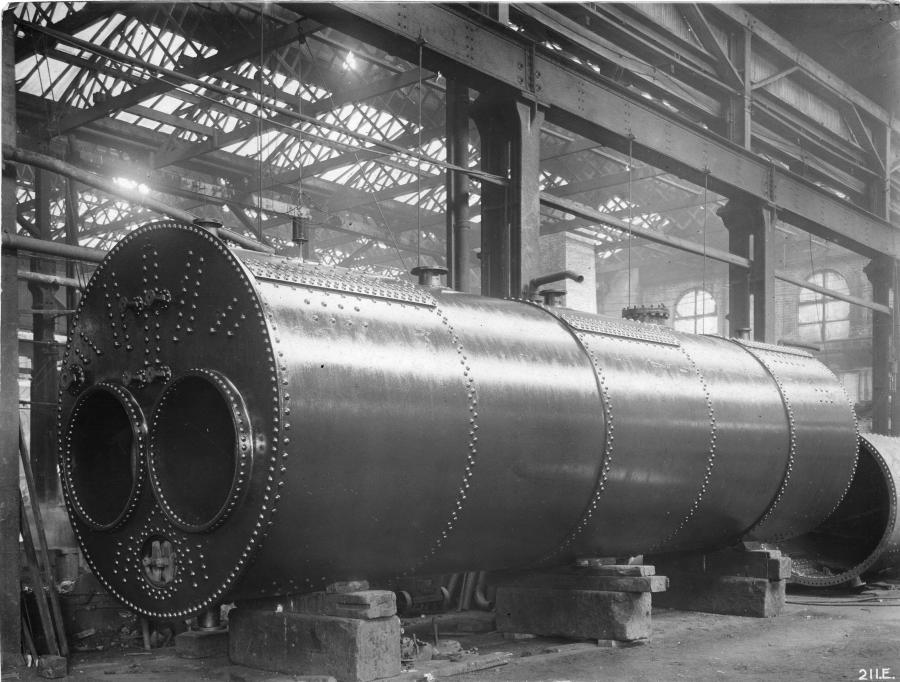
Lancashire boiler 1900, painted with a protective coating, the mountings such as safety valves, stop valve, feed check valves and water level gauges, have been removed.

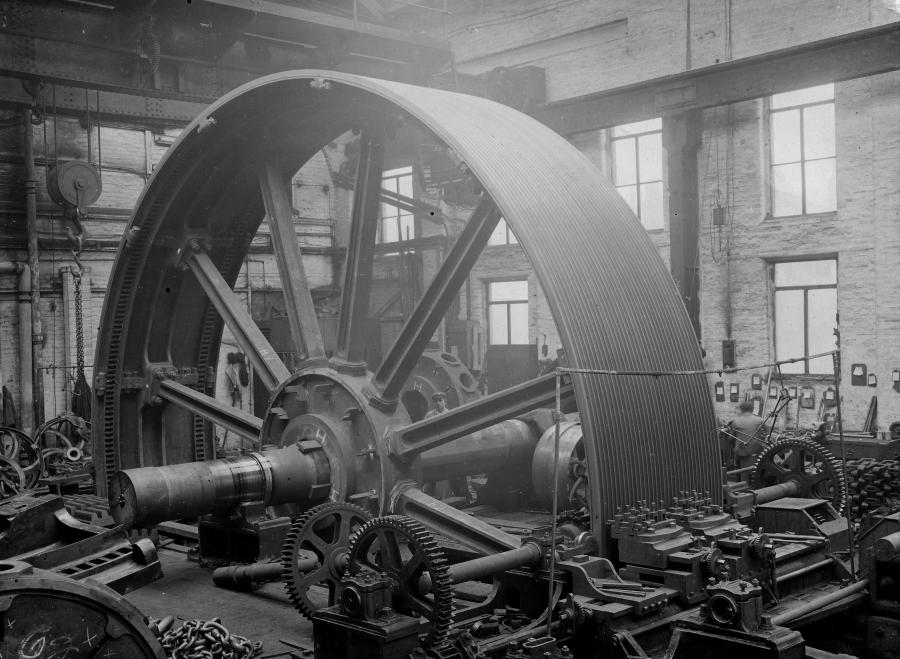
Flywheel for a large textile mill engine 1900, set up to machine grooves for the rope drives simultaneously. The saddle with two tool posts to the front. The wheel is rotated by two pinions driving via the cast-in barring gear teeth in the flywheel rim. Temporary wedges are securing the spokes to the hub of the wheel. A travelling crane behind and above.

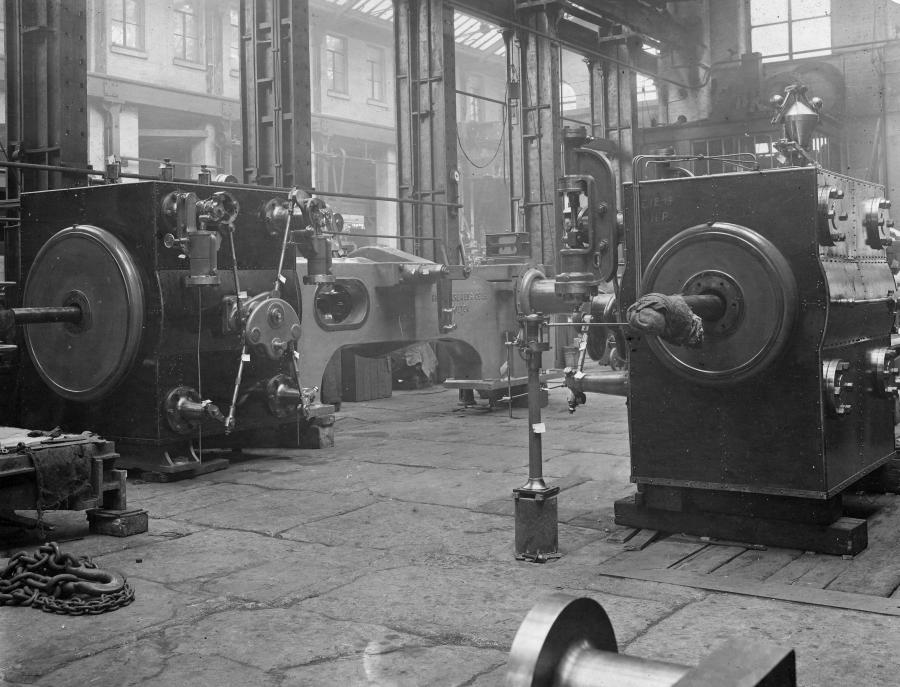
Cross compound Corliss mill engine 1900, shop assembled to ensure that the parts fit together and make any preliminary adjustments, the low-pressure cylinder is on the left, high-pressure cylinder on the right.

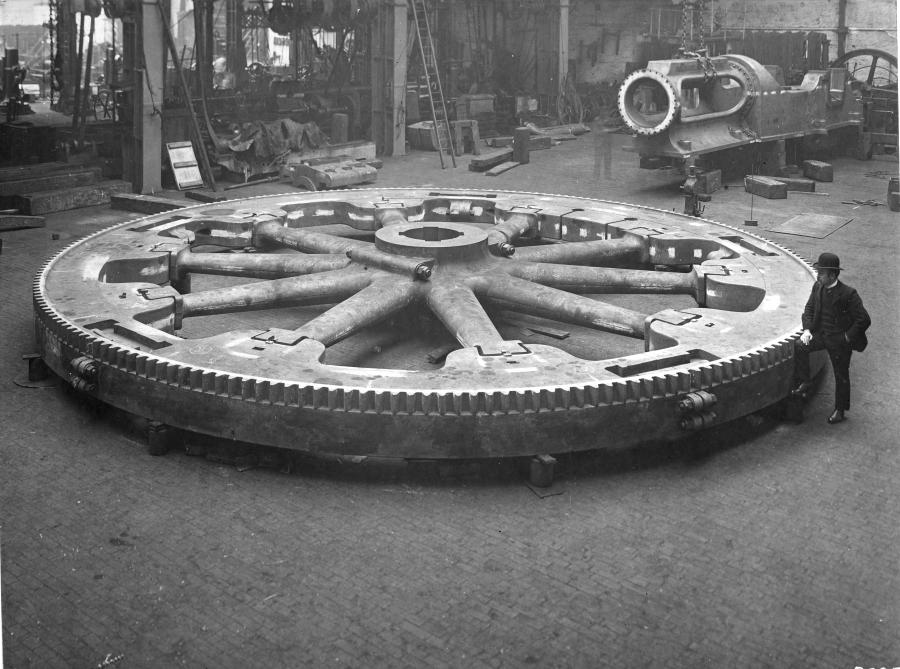
Flywheel for a large rolling mill engine 1900; the heavy rim is cast in four sections bolted together at the rim. Top right, the trunk guide and bedplate of the engine under manufacture, beyond the bedplate is the flywheel and connecting rod of a small horizontal steam engine.

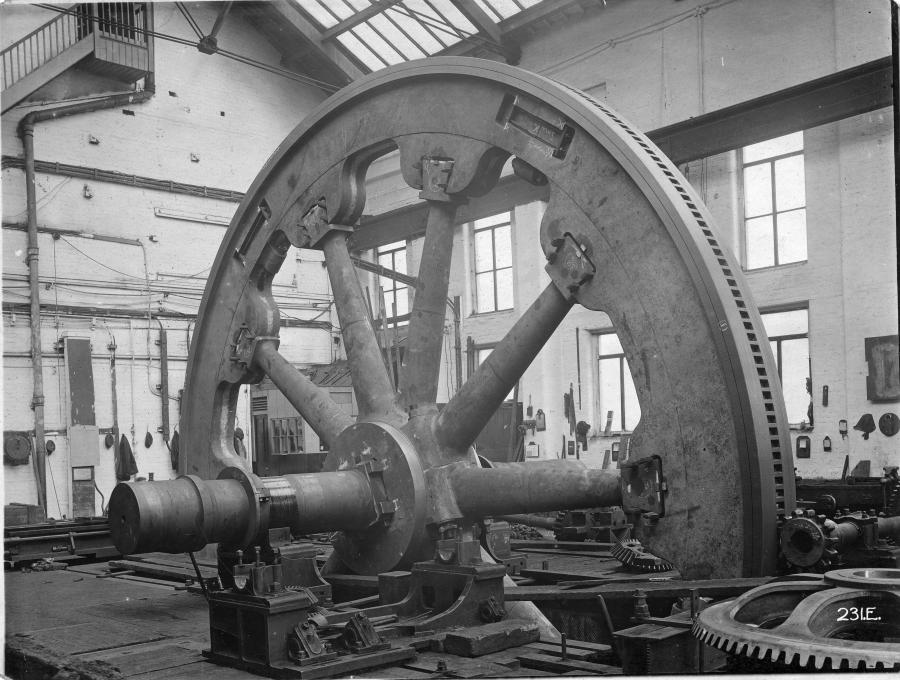
Rolling mill flywheel. The wheel is rotated by the pinion on the right.

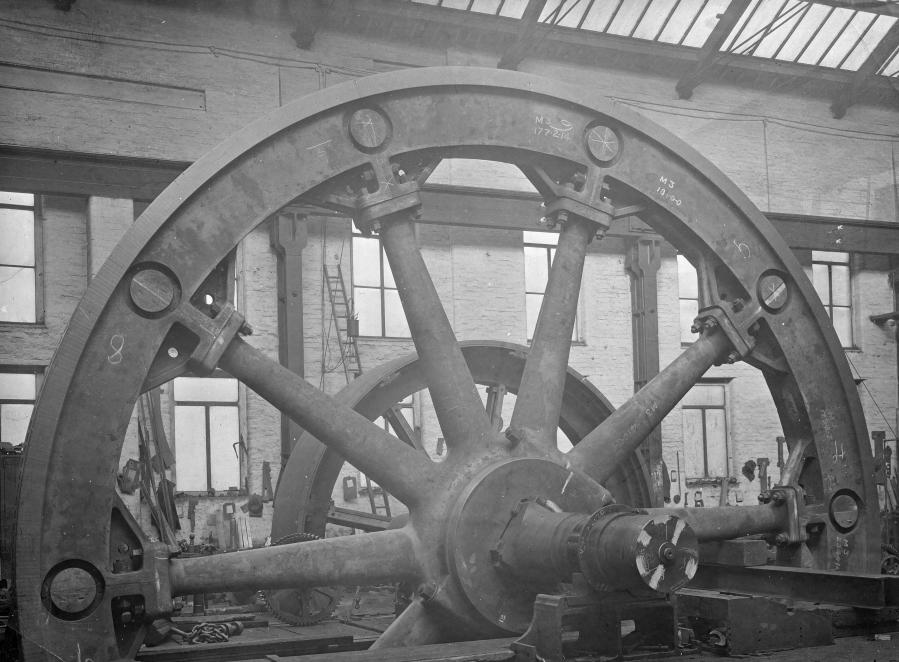
Flywheel; the hub and spokes cast in two halves, bolted at the hub with the rim assembled from ten castings. These are bolted to the spokes, held together by shrinking rings in the grooves.

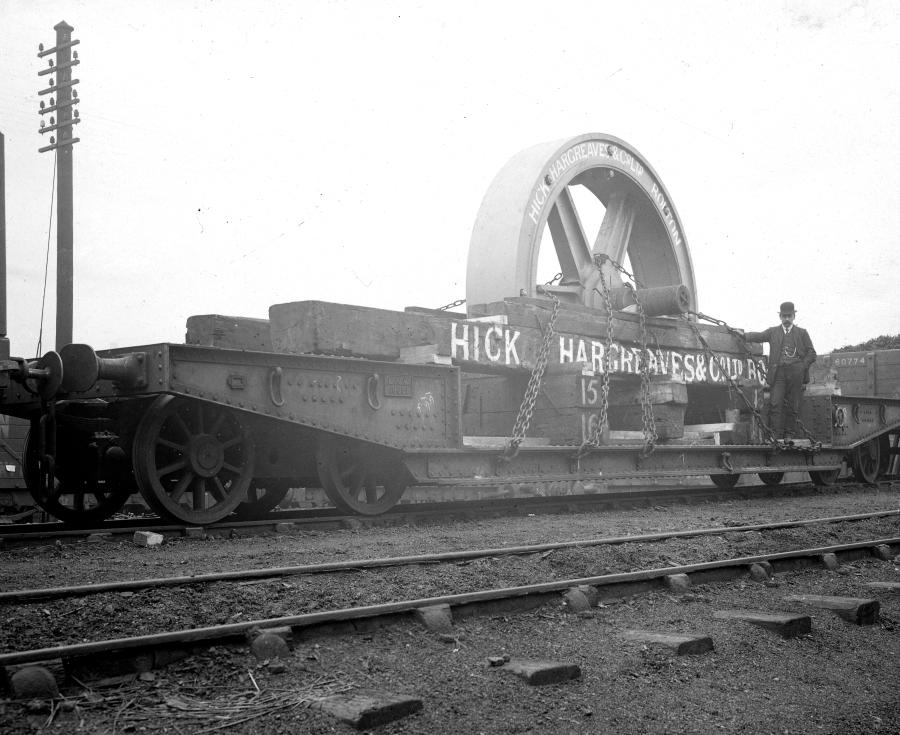
Flatcar loaded with a flywheel 1900.

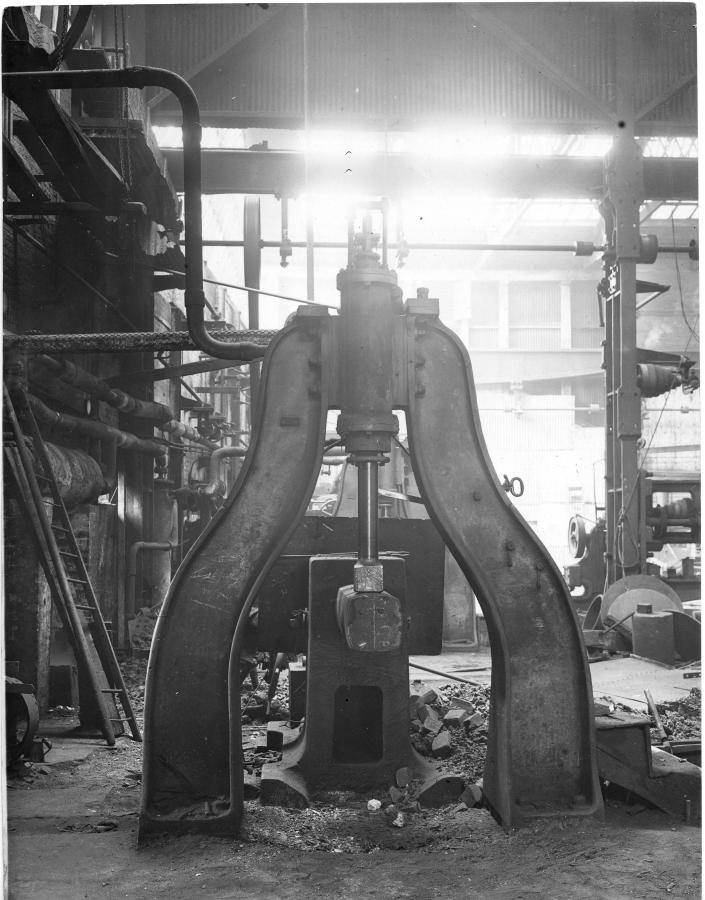
Small steam hammer 1900, with line shafting and belt drives to the rear.

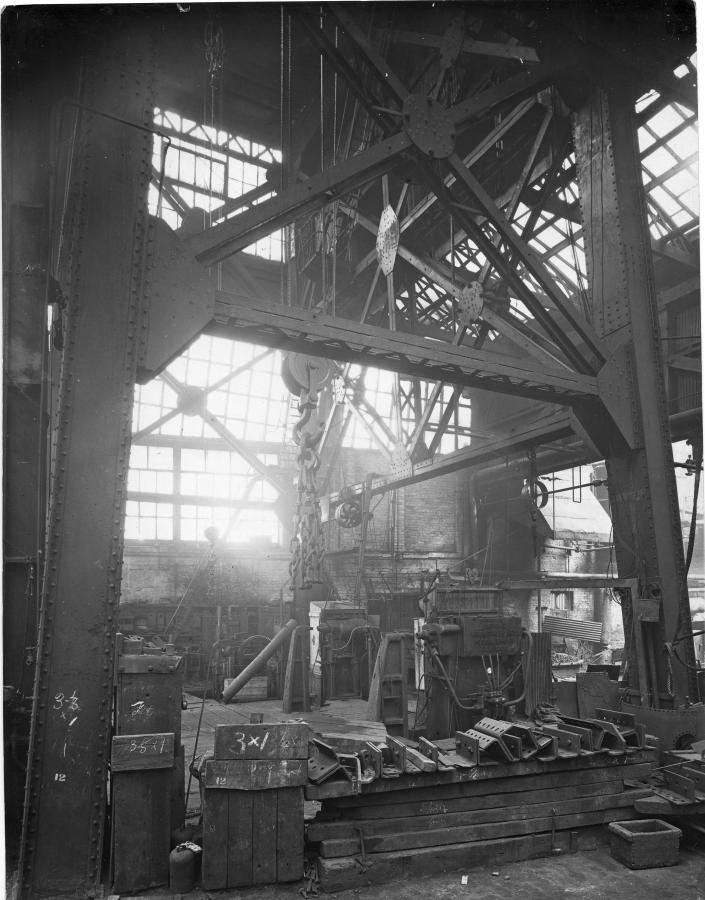
The top of two hydraulic riveting machines, their frames would have continued below the floor.

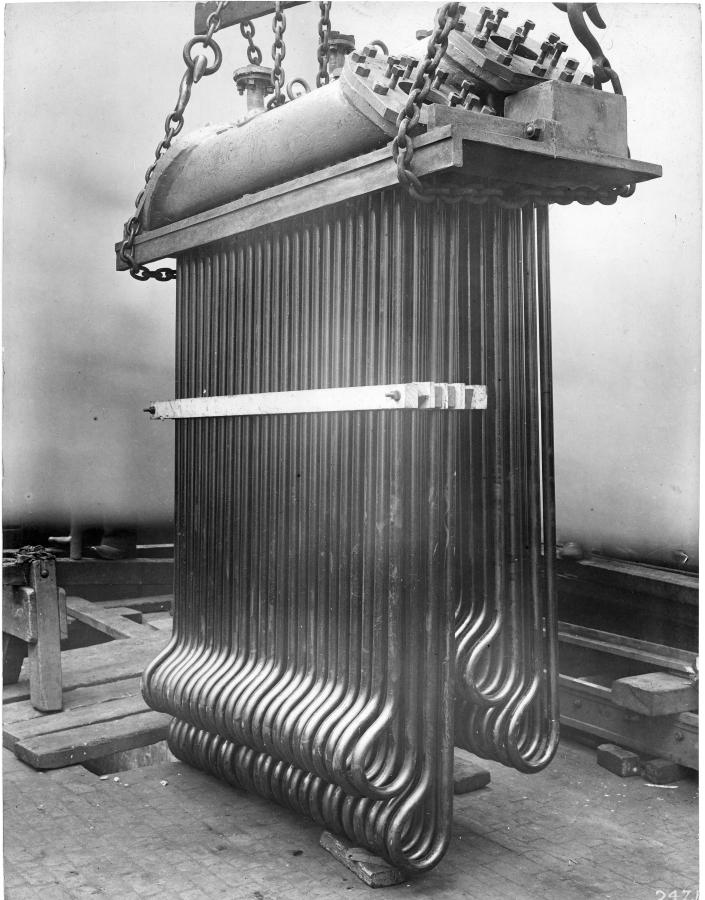
Superheater of a Lancashire boiler 1900, for the extraction of heat from waste gasses, and transfer of heat to saturated steam passing from the boiler to the steam range or engine. This raised the overall thermal efficiency of the plant, and would also prevent damage from slugs of condensate by ensuring the saturated steam was dry and not wet.

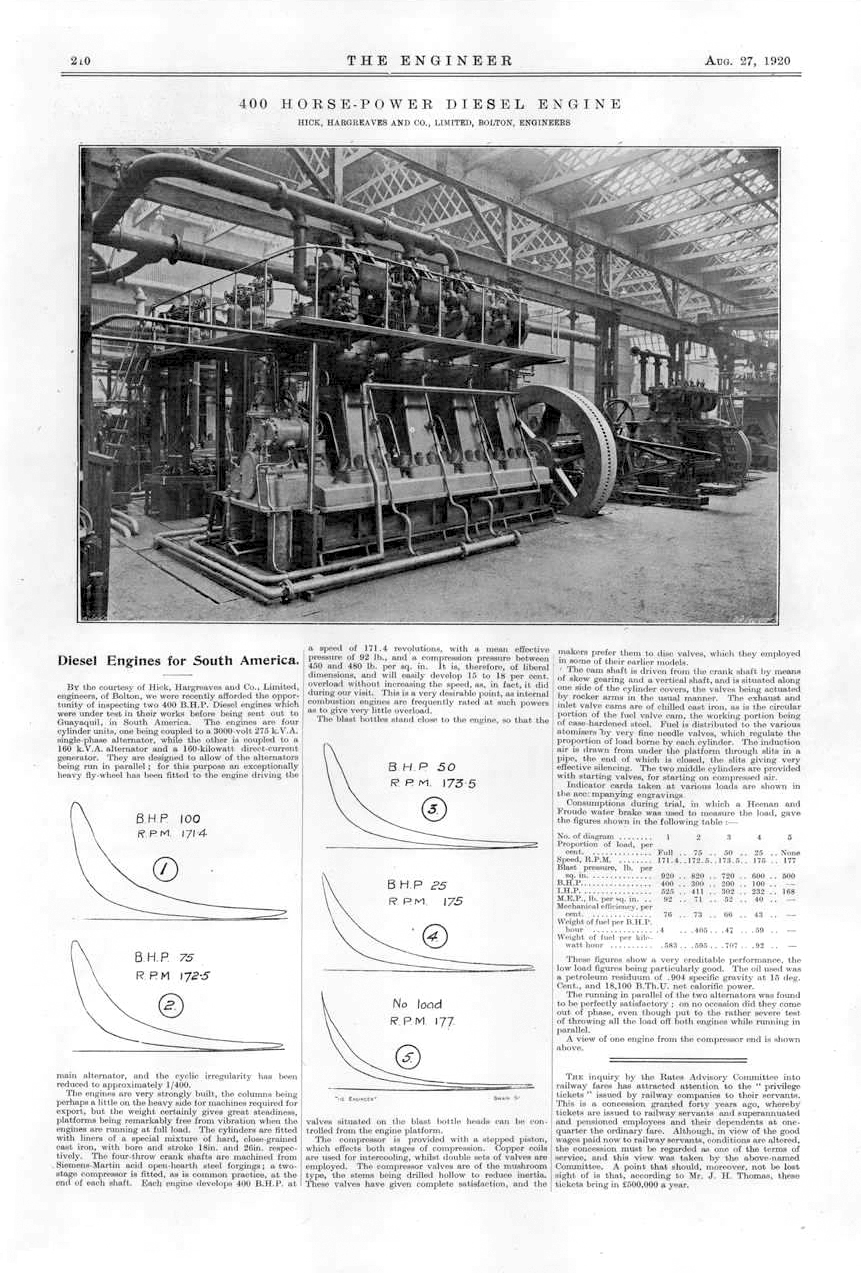
From The Engineer, a 400 hp 4-cylinder Hick Hargreaves & Co. Ltd. stationary Diesel engine under test, destined for Guayaquil, South America, 1920.

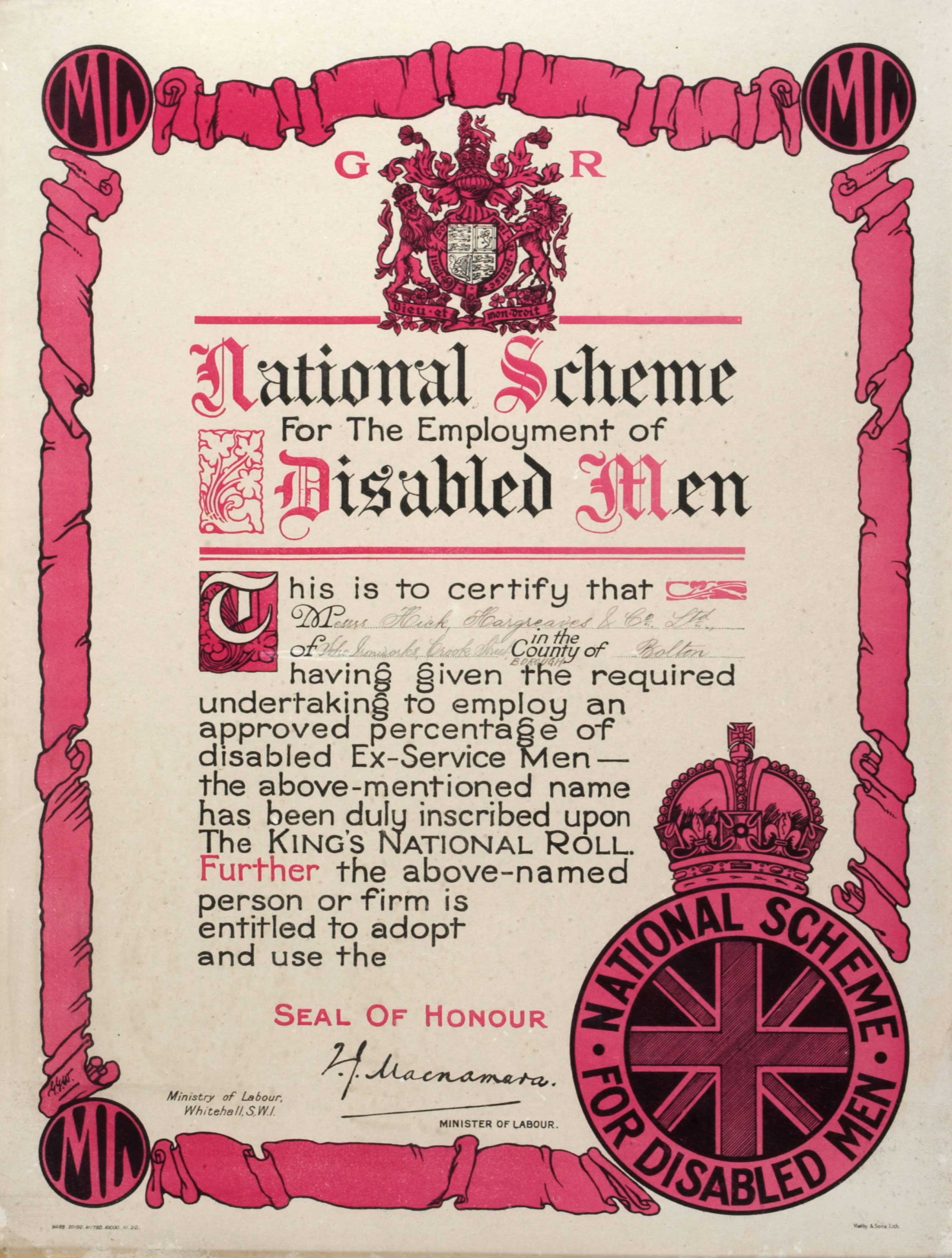
Certificate issued by The Ministry of Labour for The National Scheme for the Employment of Disabled Men, recognising the membership of Hick Hargreaves and Co. Ltd. Signed by Thomas James Macnamara, Minister of Labour 1920–1922.

== Ownership changes ==
In 1968, the Hargreaves family sold their shares to Electrical & Industrial Securities Ltd which became part of TI Group, and subsequently Smiths Group.

In 2001, BOC bought the business from Smiths Group and relocated the offices to Wingates Industrial Estate in Westhoughton, and subsequently to Lynstock Way in Lostock, as part of Edwards. Some of the manufacturing equipment was transferred to their lower cost facility in Czechoslovakia.

Smiths Group sold Soho Iron works to Sainsbury's and it closed in 2002. Two switchgear panels; the works clock, and a pair of cast iron gateposts with Hick's caduceus logo were preserved by the Northern Mill Engine Society. The 170 year old firm's records were deposited with Bolton library.

== Mills powered by B. Hick and Son engines ==
- Crimble Mill, Haywood
- Dean Mill, Barrow Bridge
- Pontneddfechan Gun Powder Works, Glynneath
- Temple Works, Leeds
- Waltham Abbey Royal Gunpowder Mills, Essex
- Woolwich Arsenal Paper Cartridge Factory, London

== Mills powered by Hick, Hargreaves engines ==
- Bedfont Gun Powder Mills, Hounslow
- Beehive Mill, Bolton
- Cavendish Mill, Ashton-under-Lyne
- Century Mill, Farnworth
- Chauntry Mills, Haverhill
- Eagley Mills, Bolton
- Ford Ayrton Mill, Bentham
- Gamble's Factory, Nottingham
- Pioneer Mill, Radcliffe
- Rose Hill Mill, Bolton
- Textile Mill, Chadderton

== See also ==
- Bradford Colliery
- James Cudworth
- Fred Dibnah
- Firepower: The Royal Artillery Museum
- Helmshore Mills Textile Museum
- House-built engine
- Redevelopment of Mumbai mills
- Thomas Pitfield
- Wadia Group
- Woolwich Works

== Bibliography ==
- Ashmore, Owen (1969). Industrial Archaeology of Lancashire. Newton Abbot: David and Charles.
- Christiansen, Rex & Miller, Robert William (1971). The North Staffordshire Railway. Newton Abbot, Devon: David & Charles. ISBN 978-0-7153-5121-5.
- Halton, Maurice J. (September 2001). The Impact of Conflict and Political Change on Northern Industrial Towns, 1890 to 1990 (PDF) (MA Dissertation). Faculty of Humanities and Social Science, Manchester Metropolitan University. Archived from the original (PDF) on 18 March 2017.
- Lowe, J.W. (1989). British Steam Locomotive Builders. Guild Publishing.
- Mathias, Peter (1983). The First Industrial Nation, An Economic History of Britain 1700–1914 (Third ed.). London: Methuen.
- Pilling, P.W. (1985). Hick Hargreaves and Co., The History of an Engineering Firm c. 1833 – 1939, a Study with Special Reference to Technological Change and Markets (Unpublished Doctoral Thesis). University of Liverpool.
- Saul, S.B. (1968). "The Engineering Industry". In Aldcroft, Derek H. (ed.). The Development of British Industry and Foreign Competition, 1875 – 1914. London: George Allen and Unwin. pp. 186–222.
- Saul, S. B. (1977). Supple, Barry (ed.). The Mechanical Engineering Industries in Britain, 1860 – 1914. Essays in British Business History. Oxford: Clarendon.
- Marshall, John (1978). "John and William Hargreaves, Benjamin and John Hick". A Biographical Dictionary of Railway Engineers. pp. 104, 112–3.
- Singer, Charles, ed. (1958). A History of Technology. Vol. 5. Oxford: Oxford University Press.
- Singleton, John (1991). Lancashire on the Scrapheap, The Cotton Industry 1945–1970. Oxford: Oxford University Press.
- Timmins, Geoffrey (1998). Made in Lancashire, A History of Regional Industrialisation. Manchester: Manchester University Press.
- University of Manchester (1932). An Industrial Survey of the Lancashire Area (Excluding Merseyside). London: HMSO.
- Wilson, John F. (2001). Ferranti: A History, Building a Family Business, 1882–1975. Lancaster: Carnegie.
