= Elmslie =

Elmslie is a surname. Notable people with the surname include:

== Surname ==
- Brittany Elmslie (born 1994), Australian swimmer
- George Elmslie (politician) (1861–1918), Australian politician
- George Grant Elmslie (1869–1952), American architect
- John Elmslie (1831–1907), Scottish minister
- Kenward Elmslie (1929–2022), American writer and poet
- Susan Elmslie, Canadian poet and professor of English
- W. A. Elmslie (1856–1935), Scottish missionary
- William Jackson Elmslie (1832–1872), Scottish Presbyterian doctor in India

== Given name ==
- Elmslie William Dallas (1809–1879), Scottish artist, teacher and photographer
- Donald Elmslie Robertson Watt (1926–2004), Scottish historian and Professor Emeritus
- Jean Elmslie Henderson Findlay (1885–1944), Scottish author and editor

== Other ==
- Elmslie School, a defunct school in Blackpool, Lancashire, England
- Elmslie typology
- Purcell & Elmslie, an American architectural practice

== See also ==
- Emslie, a similar surname
