= John Emslie =

British cartographer, artist & bookplate engraver

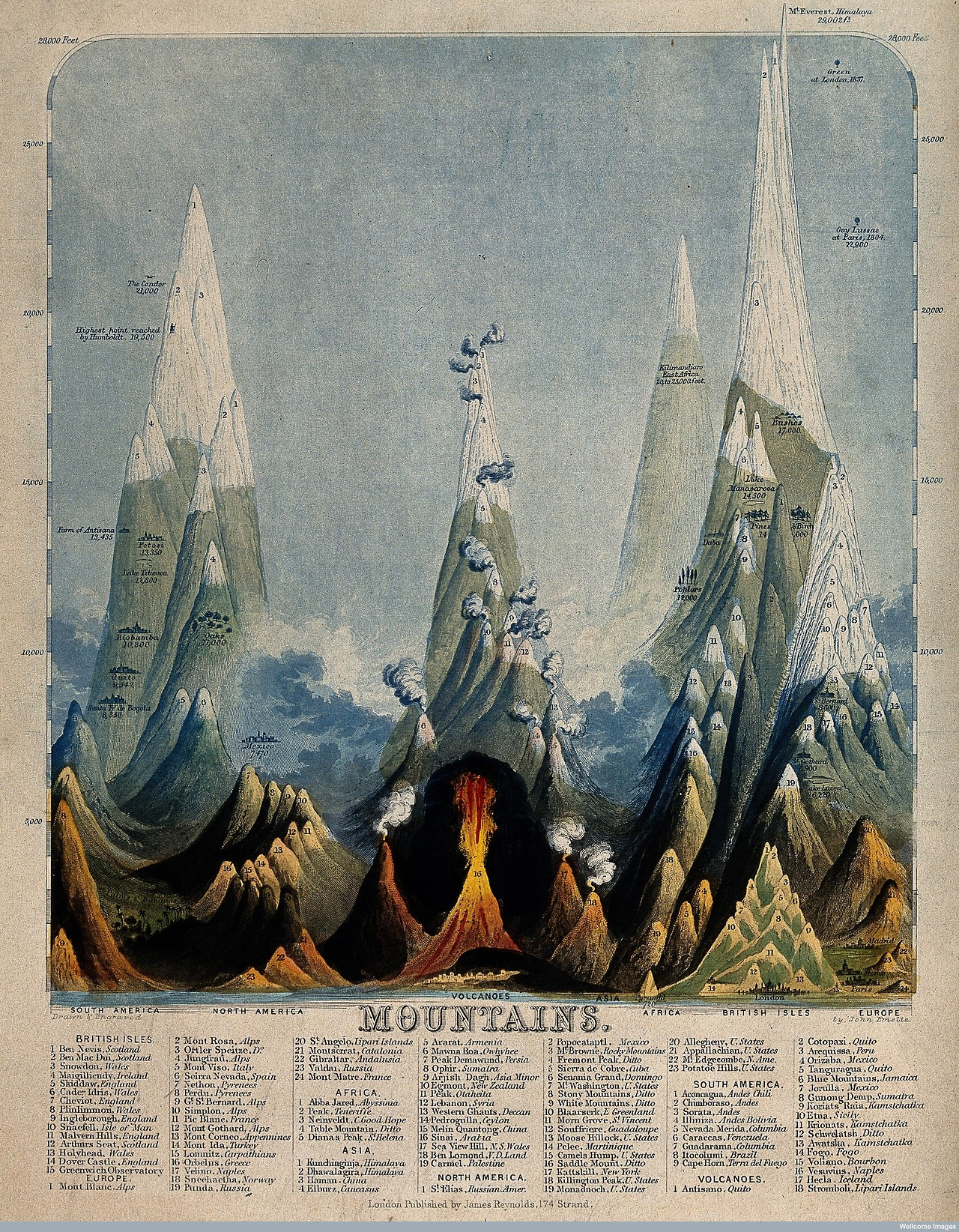

John Emslie (1813–1875) was a British cartographer, artist & bookplate engraver.

Emslie was responsible for the design, hand colouring and engraving of education artworks. His art featured on teaching cards, educational posters, published through James Reynolds & Sons of 174 Strand, London.

In 1850, Emslie hand painted and engraved a series of 44 charts and posters, in response to the popular demand for information on the developments taking place in science and engineering as a result of the Industrial Revolution. The educational series ran 1850-1860 and covered topics of geology, geography, astronomy and natural philosophy.

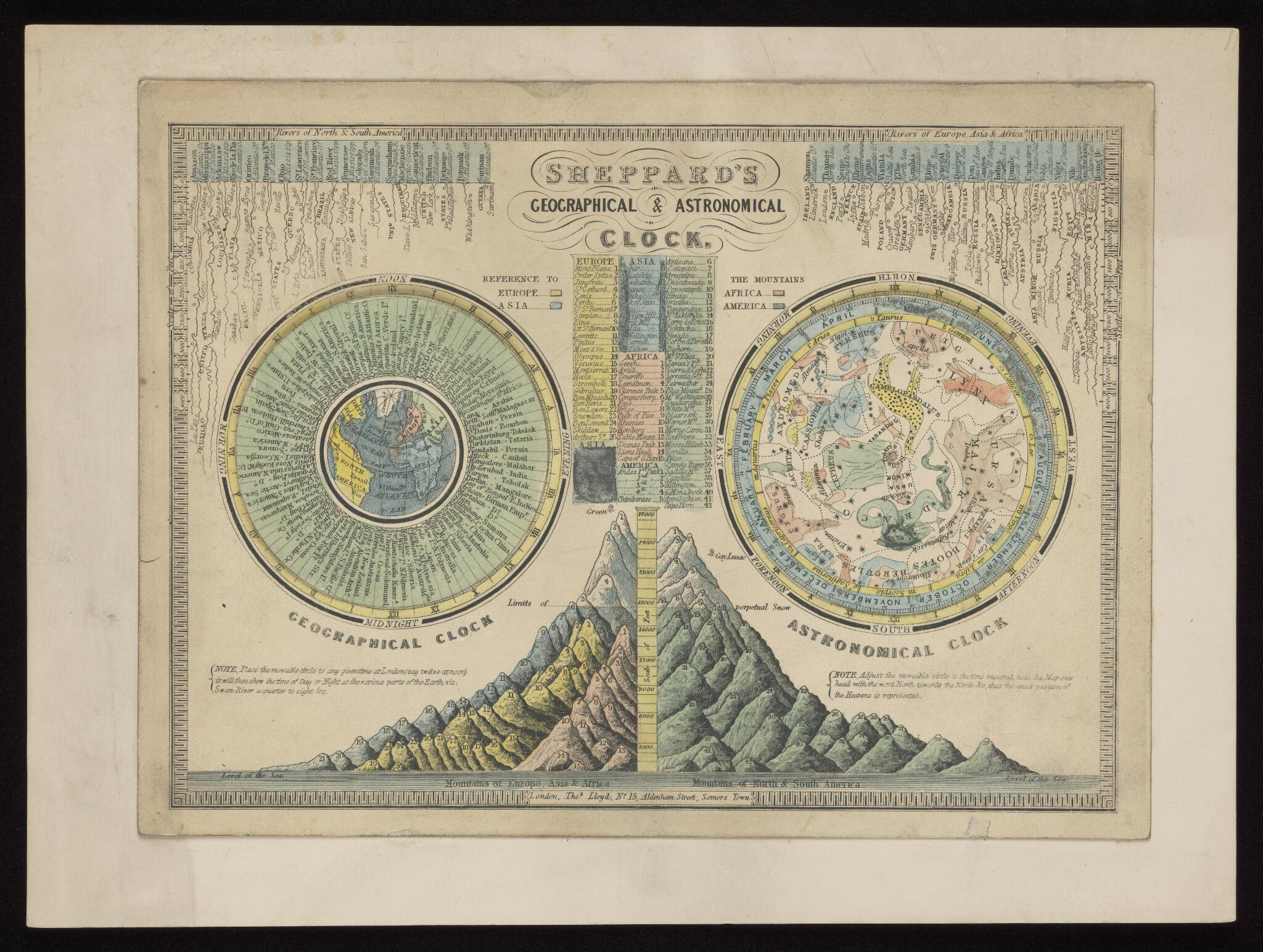
John Emslie hand-engraved artwork

Emslie was father to artists John Phillipps Emslie (1839–1913), a figure painter, and Alfred Edward Emslie (1848-1918), British genre & portrait painter. He was father-in-law to Rosalie M. Emslie (1854-1932), a miniature painter, and grandfather to Rosalie Emslie (1891-1977) figure, portrait and landscape painter.

In 1913, the British Museum received a large collection of his work, donated by J.P. Emslie. His works are collected by the British Museum, Wellcome Collection, and online through Getty Images.
