= Goulburn Pumping Station =

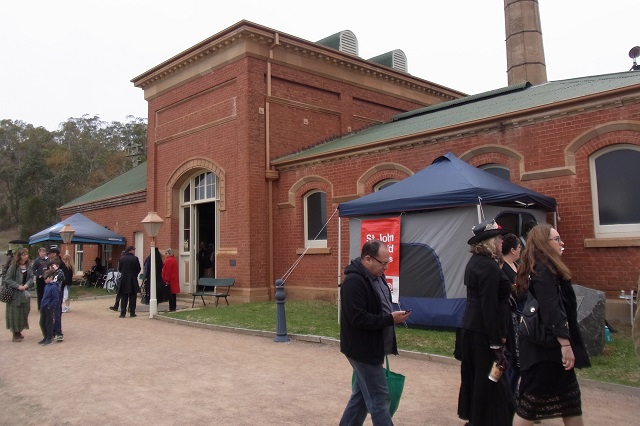

- Location within New South Wales Location within Australia
- 34.7369°S 149.7040°E
- Location: Wollondilly River, Goulburn, Goulburn Mulwaree Council, New South Wales, Australia

History
- Built: 1885–1886

Site notes
- Owner: Goulburn Mulwaree Council

New South Wales Heritage Register
- Official name: Goulburn Pumping Station, Marsden Weir & Appleby Steam Engine; Goulburn Steam Museum Pump House
- Type: state heritage (complex / group)
- Designated: 2 April 1999
- Reference no.: 356
- Type: Water Pump House/Pumping Station
- Category: Utilities – Water

Goulburn Pumping Station is a heritage-listed former municipal water supply system that now serves as a museum on the Wollondilly River at Goulburn in the Southern Tablelands region of New South Wales, Australia. It was built from 1885 to 1886. It includes the historic Appleby Steam Engine, which is contained in the pumping station.

The facility is the only complete, workable beam engine powered municipal water supply left in its original location in the Southern Hemisphere. It now operates as the Goulburn Historic Waterworks Museum. The property is owned by Goulburn Mulwaree Council. It was added to the New South Wales State Heritage Register on 2 April 1999.

== History ==
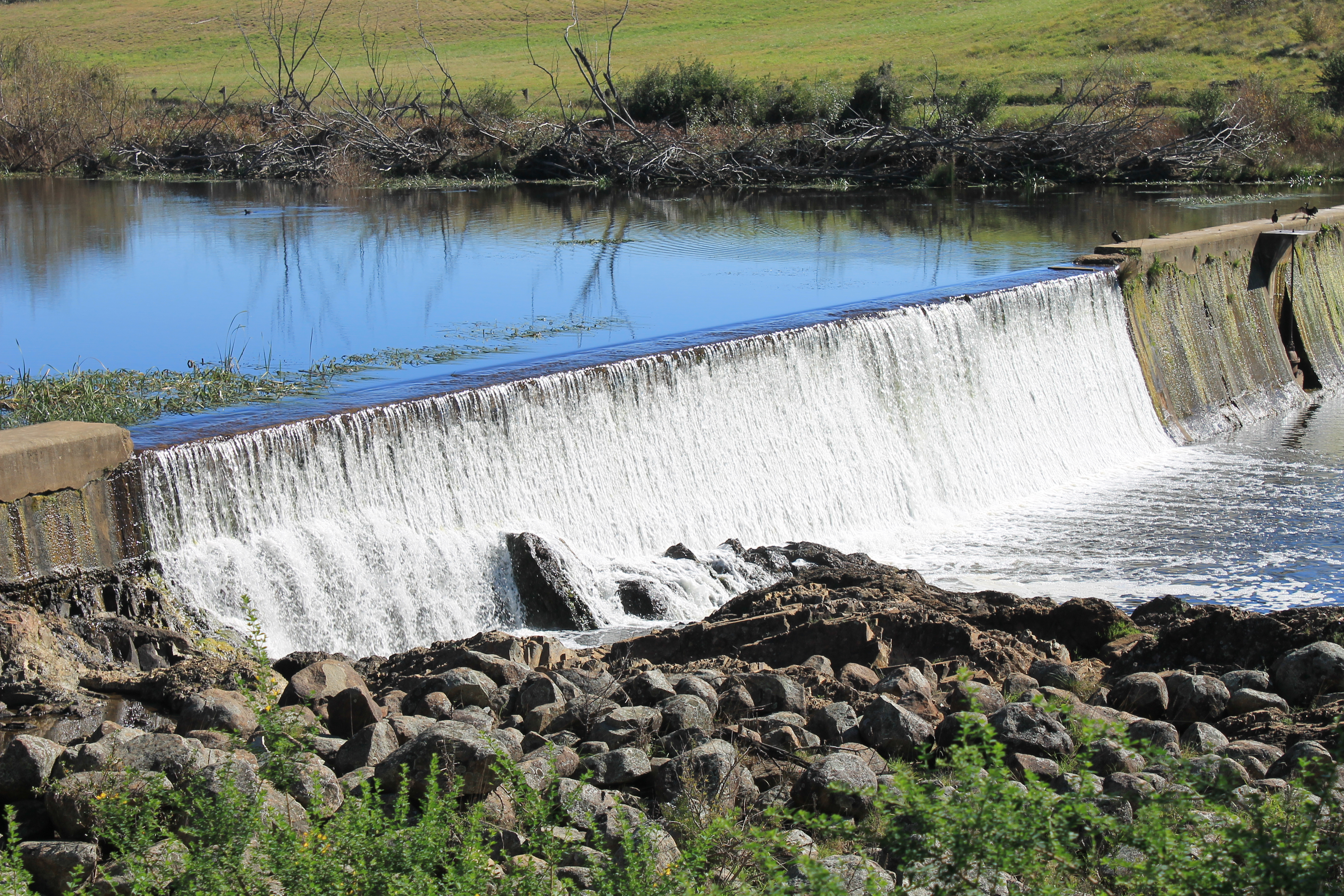
Marsden Weir, 2012

The steam-operated pumping station was built in 1885 on the banks of the Wollondilly River at Marsden Weir, providing Goulburn's first reticulated water supply. It became operational in January 1886. The pumphouse still contains the original Appleby Bros. Beam Engine pump and Lancashire Boilers. The pumphouse was powered by timber – wood piles fired the boilers 24 hours a day, seven days a week.

Before 1886 the residents of Goulburn would have collected water in tanks or wells, or purchased supplies from a carter. The demand of the growing city resulted in the Rivers and Harbours Board installing a waterworks on the Wollondilly River at Rocky Point powered by a steam operated beam engine. Water was pumped from the river to a filtration plant and reservoir, then gravity fed to residents of the city.

Appleby Beam Engine

The original 1883 Appleby Bros. steam engine situated inside the pumphouse was one of four installed in Pumphouses around NSW. The others were at Wagga Wagga, Albury (both scrapped in 1936) and Bathurst. The steam engine is known as a beam engine because of the large overhead rocking beam that transmits motion from the pistons to the cranks.

This great beam engine, of the type first invented by Thomas Newcomen in 1712, is an example of the powerhouse that drove the Industrial Revolution. Originally designed for pumping water out of mines in the UK it was improved by Watt, Smeaton, Maudsley and other engineers of the steam age until it became a very efficient and reliable engine.

Apart from mines and water supplies, many thousands were used to drive factory machinery in the 18th and 19th centuries – some four operated in factories in Goulburn – until they were superseded by electric motors in the early 20th century.

Goulburn's Beam Engine, 1883

The Goulburn Waterworks engine is of medium size and produces 120 horse power. It has compound cylinders and a jet condenser. The fly wheel is 5 metres in diameter and at 18 r.p.m. the pumps delivered 660,000 litres of water per hour.

The two boilers that produce the steam that powers the engine, are located in the western wing of the building.

Fired by wood or coal, they produce high temperature steam that is piped through to the beam engine in the central part of the building. Only one boiler would have been operational at any one time. The other being shut down for regular cleaning and maintenance.

Steam from the boilers enters the valve chest on the cylinders from where it is transmitted to the cylinders by means of a valve mechanism. The action of the steam on the pistons causes them to reciprocate. Rods connect the pistons to the beam at one end, and to the crank at the other. This converts the "rocking" motion to rotary motion which makes the flywheel turn, giving a smooth and continuous action

By 1918 the beam engine had become obsolete when electric motors were installed.

Idle for many years, Goulburn's Beam Engine was restored in 1958.

The Pumphouse

The east wing of the building houses a horizontal steam engine, the Hick Hargreave and the early dynamo room with its electric pump.

The Waterworks is notable not just for its historic steam engine, but for the elegant Victorian building that houses the beam engine and boilers. Only metres away further up the hill stands the original fireman's cottage, also of Victorian design.

Horizontal Engine by Hick, Hargreaves & Co., England, 1866

From 1968 the Goulburn Waterworks operated as a museum of engines. It was during this period that a grant was made available under the Regional Employment Development Scheme (1975) which saw some of this funding used for the installation of the Hick Hargreaves engine now on display and operational on steaming days, in the annexe of the pumphouse.

The single cylinder horizontal engine measures 9 metres in length, weighs 17 tons with the flywheel being 4 metres in diameter. Used to power equipment in a Sydney tannery, before being discarded in 1961, it was acquired to represent the next stage of steam engine development after the beam type engine.

== Heritage listing ==
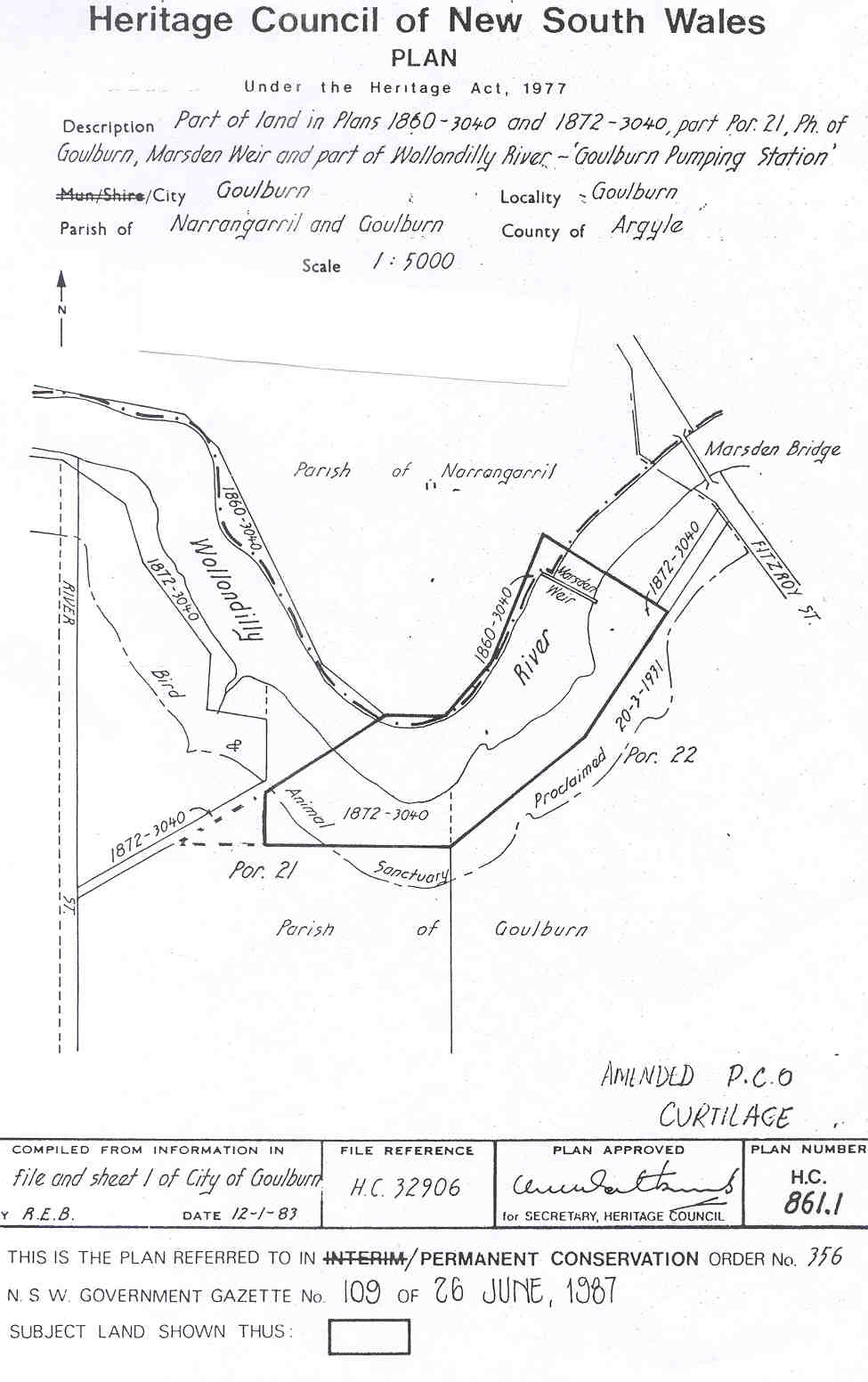
Heritage boundaries

Goulburn Pumping Station, Marsden Weir & Appleby Steam Engine was listed on the New South Wales State Heritage Register on 2 April 1999.

== Engineering heritage award ==
The Goulburn Waterworks, including the pumping station, received a Historic Engineering Marker from Engineers Australia as part of its Engineering Heritage Recognition Program.
