= Temple Works =

Former flax mill and listed building in Holbeck, West Yorkshire, England

Coordinates: 53.7897°N 1.5529°W

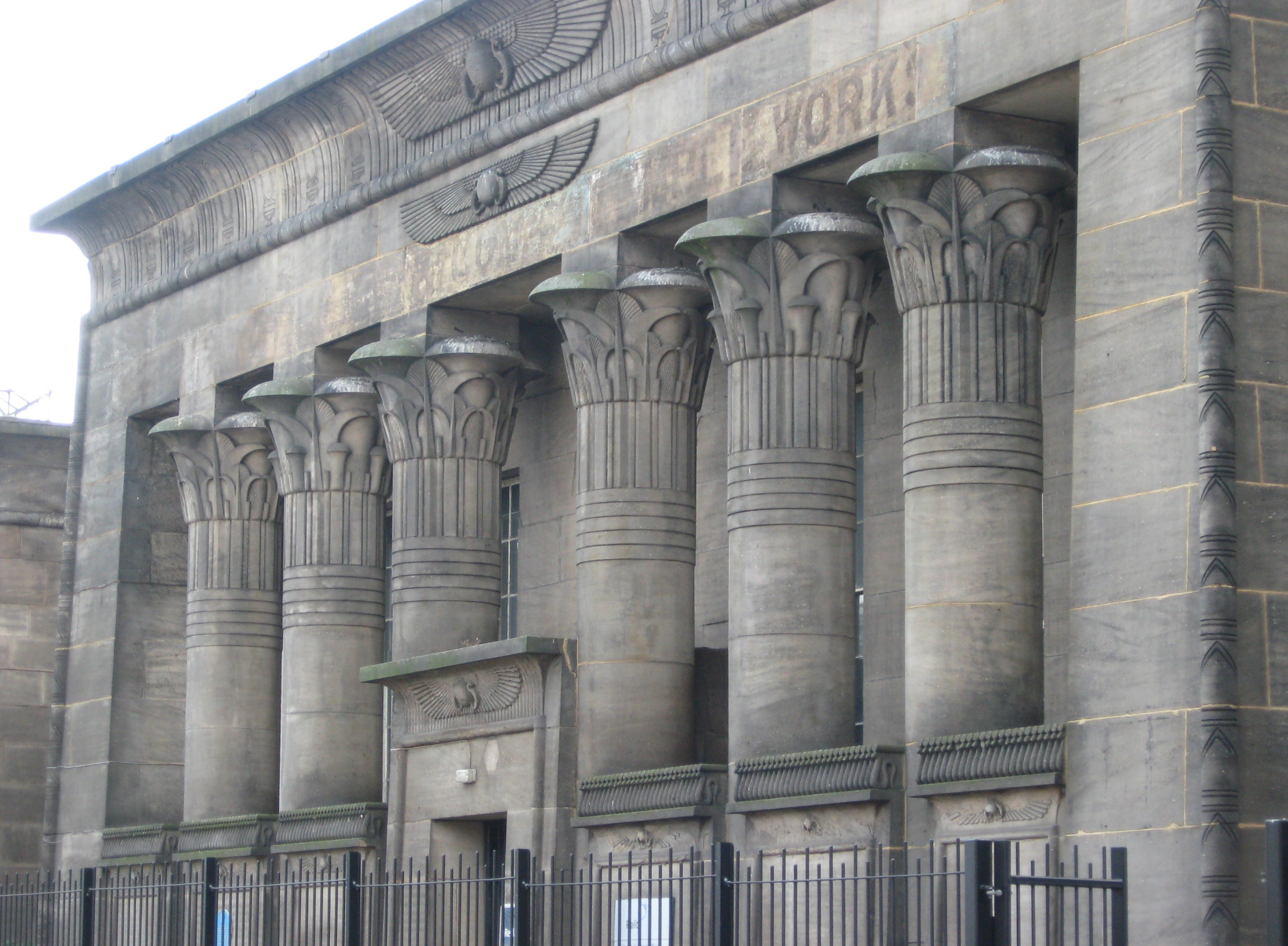
- Facade of the Temple Works office block

Flax
- Architectural style: Egyptian
- Structural system: Largest single room in the world when built
- Location: Holbeck, Leeds

Construction
- Built: 1836
- Employees: 2600 (1840)
- Decommissioned: 1886
- Floor count: 1
- Main contractor: Marshall and Co.

Design team
- Architect: Joseph Bonomi the Younger
- Structural engineer: James Coombe
- Other designers: David Roberts

Power
- Date: 1840
- Engine maker: B. Hick & Sons
- Engine type: Two-cylinder beam engine
- Valve Gear: Double-ended slide valves
- rpm: 19
- Installed horse power (ihp): 240
- Flywheel diameter: 26ft (7.9m)

Equipment
- No. of looms
- Other Equipment: 7,000 spindles

Listed Building – Grade I

Temple Works is a former flax mill in Holbeck, Leeds, West Yorkshire, England. It was designed by the engineer James Coombe a former pupil of John Rennie; the painter David Roberts; and the architect Joseph Bonomi the Younger. It was built in the Egyptian Revival style for the industrialist John Marshall between 1836 and 1840 to contain a 240 horsepower double-beam engine by Benjamin Hick (B. Hick & Sons). Temple Works is the only Grade I listed building in Holbeck.

== History ==
By 1842 John Marshall owned four mills in Holbeck. They were known as Mills B to E, Mill A having been demolished in 1837. The early 1830s had been a time of great prosperity for the firm after the introduction of the wet spinning process in 1829, the transition to which took five years to complete. John Marshall's four sons all entered the business, but increasingly he relied on his son James concerning the manufacturing side. The firm's competitors in Leeds were all prospering and had built or had plans to build sizeable new mills. The firm at that time specialised in making fine yarns, principally for the French market, but this was starting to decline. Therefore, James Marshall decided upon a programme of diversification into thread and cloth manufacture. This decision to diversify required an extension to the manufacturing facility in Holbeck. James had two alternative plans, another six storey mill on the site of the demolished Mill A in Water Lane, or a single storey building extending from Mill C in Marshall Street south to the junction with Sweet Street. He compared the cost of the two mills and calculated the single storey structure would cost £24,000, about 15% cheaper than a comparable six storey building. The new building was modelled at one third the full size in the yard of Mill C. James persuaded his father, then in semi-retirement, that the single storey mill should be built. A Mr Smith had already built the first single-storey cotton mill in Deanston, near Stirling, but Messrs. Marshall planned a much larger and complete specimen.

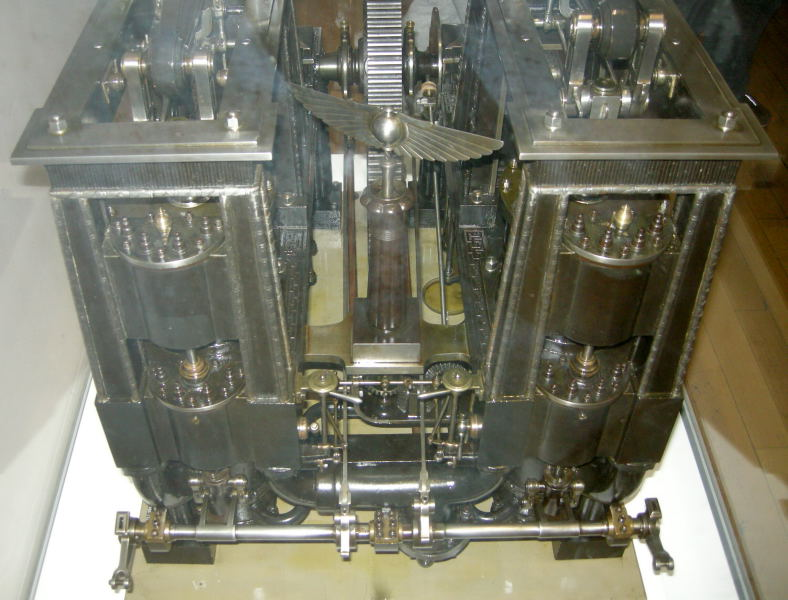
Scale model of Hick's double beam engine, showing the winged sun regulator on display in Science Museum, London

Temple Works, also known as Temple Mill, comprises an office building and a factory. The office building has a stone facade consisting of 18 full-height windows separated by 18 pillars with an overhanging cornice in the Egyptian style, based on the temple at Antaeopolis and the Temple of Horus at Edfu. The factory building derived from the Typhonium at Dendera. There was a chimney in the style of an obelisk, but after it developed a crack it was demolished and replaced by a brick structure in 1852. Hick's engine was modelled with Egyptian details, including a regulator designed by his son Benjamin in the form of a winged solar disk, and replaced the original Watt engines.

James Marshall wrote to his father John in May 1838 describing the arrangements for lighting the building using about 60 conical glass skylights, 14 feet in diameter and rising 10 feet above the roof. By this means light poured into the room at all hours of the day. Underground in brick vaulted cellars ran a maze of passageways, tradesmen's shops and private baths for the use of the workers (cold, free; hot, one penny). In one room a fan pushed steam-heated air into the factory, which was kept at a constant temperature and humidity. In 1847–50 a church, St John the Evangelist, was constructed behind Temple Mill to a Gothic design by George Gilbert Scott. Other outbuildings were added, including stables.

The opening of the factory in June 1840 was marked by a great Temperance Tea for the firm's 2,600 workers. Six months later the machinery had been installed and the mill began production. The adjoining office building was completed a few years later. The new buildings did not extend to Sweet Street, as planned, and the factory was only half the size James Marshall had forecast and had only half the spindles it could have housed. All the extra yarn produced was turned into thread, and no cloth was ever woven, as had also been planned, because of the slump in demand for finished products in the 1840s. The flax spinners of Leeds then lost their competitive edge as free trade meant that they could no longer compete with their counterparts in Ireland, France and Belgium. The demand for linen was drastically reduced as it came to be replaced by cotton. Day-to-day control of Temple Mill passed to the manager, John Richardson, who had been with the firm since the 1820s. He installed several of his friends and relations in senior positions with salaries of between 300 and 500 pounds a year each.

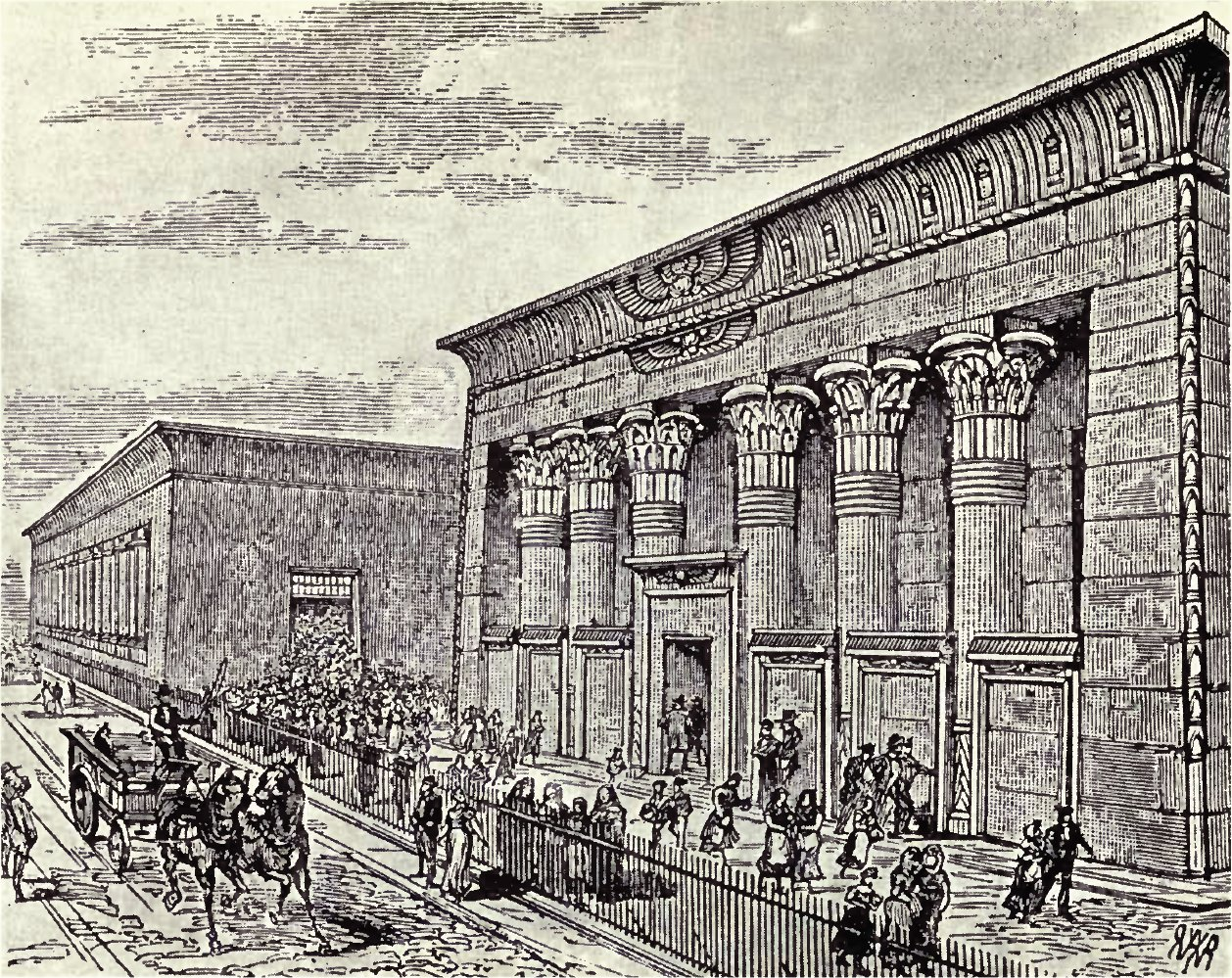
Exterior of Marshall's flax-mill, probably c. 1843

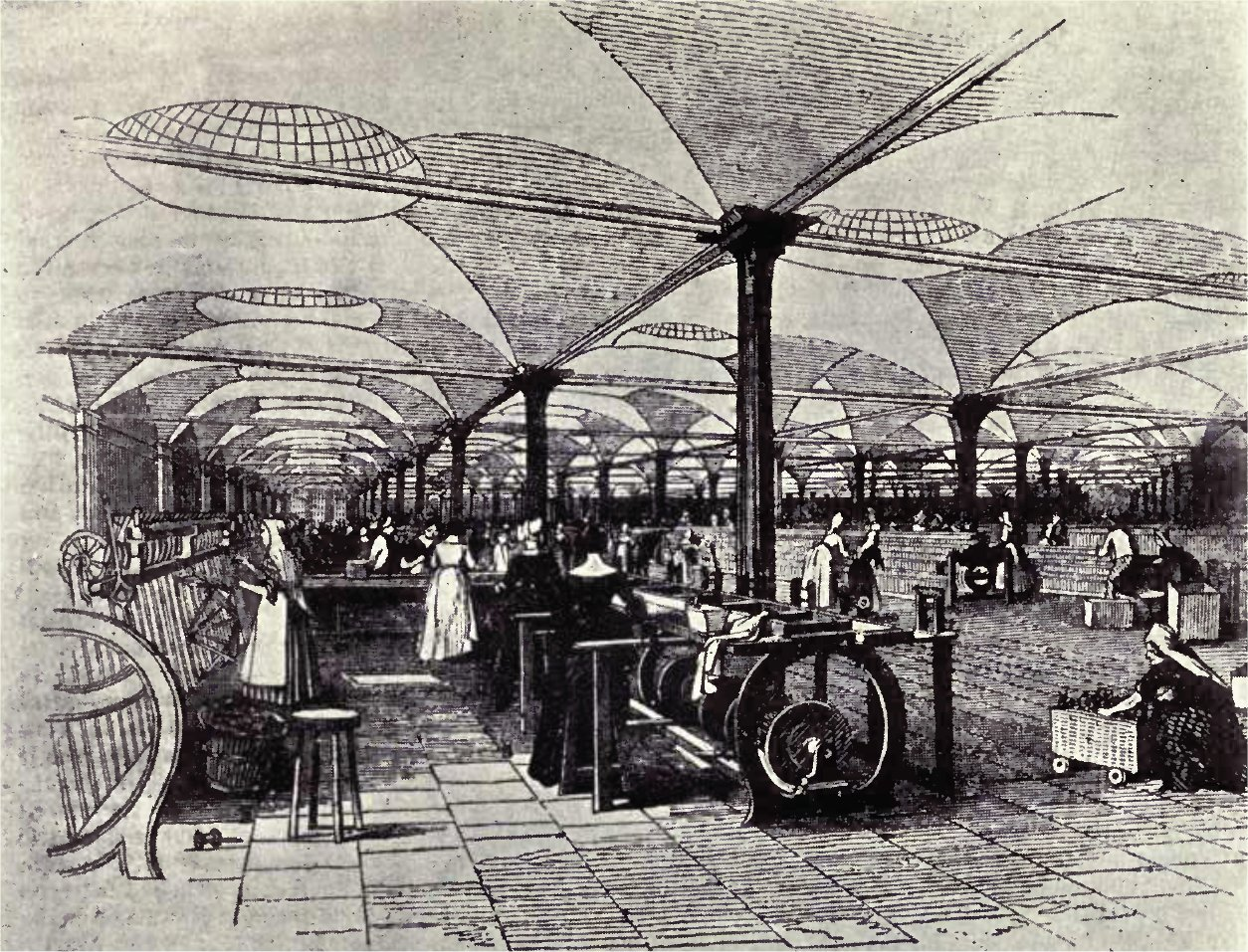
Interior of Marshall's flax-mill

On 11 August 1871 600 operatives at the Water Lane mills staged a one-day strike for a 10% pay rise. Richardson first threatened them, then closed all the mills the following day. Stephen Marshall, one of the third generation, traced the unrest to Temple Mill, 'as bad a lot of men as we have'. He proposed the public dismissal of the foreman at Temple Mill in such a way as to ruin him. Other members of the family persuaded Stephen Marshall to re-open the mills and negotiate, but talks dragged on for days. The Leeds Mercury published an article contrasting the poverty and insecurity of a worker's life with the spending and luxury of the Marshall family. The 10% wage increase was conceded after a family meeting, but the family determined it would deal with the trouble makers at Temple Mill in the long term.

The Marshall firm continued in business longer than most of its Leeds competitors, eventually closing in 1886, although it made a loss in twenty one out of the last forty years of its existence. However, by the late 1870s Temple Mill was sub-let and ceased to be a net expense to the business. It was sold by auction in 1886 along with all the other assets of the firm.

The Marshalls' inspiration for the design of Temple Works was their interest in Egyptology. When it was built it was said that Temple Works was the biggest single room in the world. An unusual feature of the Temple Works building is that sheep used to graze on the grass-covered roof. This served the purpose of retaining humidity in the flax mill to prevent the linen thread from becoming dried out and unmanageable. Sheep are not able to use stairs so the first hydraulic lift was devised in order to resolve the problem of moving them onto the roof; Hick was a hydraulics engineer, but it is not clear whether he was responsible for the invention, his youngest son, William Hick (1820–1844) supervised the installation of the 'Egyptian' beam engine from Leeds during 1841.

== 1842 General Strike ==
The mill was caught up in the Plug Riots of August 1842. The Leeds Annals described the events at the mill:

"The vicinity of the new mill in Marshall Street was completely crammed with an excited mob, many of whom were armed with bludgeons, stones &c. The yard-door leading to the boilers of the new mill was strongly defended by Mr J. G. Marshall, and a number of workmen; but the mob by repeated efforts forced down the door, and rushed into the yard. They could not find the plug of the boiler, and consequently did not succeed in stopping the mill. They left the premises without having done any serious mischief, and then proceeded to the mill of Messrs. Titley, Tatham and Walker, Water Lane, which they were engaged in stopping when Prince George with the Lancers came up at full speed and formed in a line in Camp Field. The riot act was read, and two or three of the ringleaders were taken prisoners ... ."

== Later use ==
In the 1970s the building was used as the Kays Mail Order Warehouse, and some of the workers were photographed by Peter Mitchell outside the building at the end of their night shift.

== Restoration ==
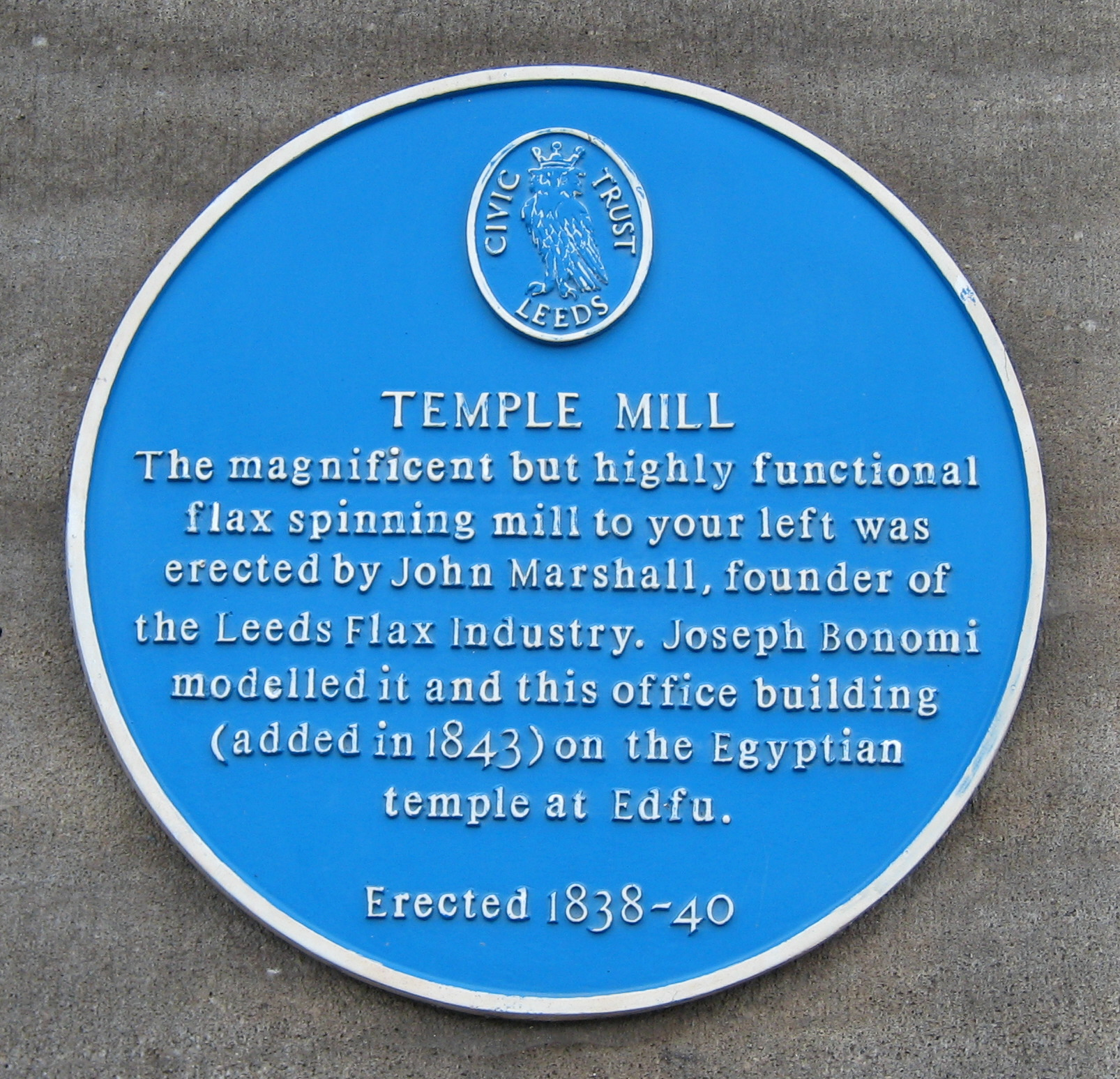
Temple Mill blue plaque 2018

A planning application dated July 2005 proposed to partly demolish, refurbish, and extend the mill to form a retail centre, offices, cafes, 75 flats and parking. On 8 December 2008 a stone pillar in the mill's facade collapsed. A slab of millstone grit fell onto the pavement in Marshall Street and the roof parapet above the pillar bowed out. English Heritage advised on a strategy for repairs; their spokesman said that the building was "probably the finest example of a carved stone elevation in the whole region".

In November 2015, Burberry announced plans to use the site for manufacturing. However, following the Brexit vote, they put the plans on hold, finally abandoning them in 2017. The building was put up for auction in 2017 with a starting price of £1. The new buyer, CEG, gave an estimate of £35 million for the restoration works in June 2019, with the building forming part of plans for regeneration of the South Bank of Leeds.

In March 2020 it was announced that the building was under consideration as a planned Northern branch of the British Library. The government's 2020 budget promised £25 million towards the restoration of Temple Works to enable its use by the British Library.

In February 2025 the Ministry of Housing, Communities and Local Government (MHCLG) confirmed an additional £10 million of funding for Homes England to bring the Temple Works building into public ownership, with a view to establishing the viability of a permanent British Library presence at the site.

The government's Culture Recovery Fund, in partnership with Historic England, also made available over £1 million in funding for repair work.

== In popular culture ==
Temple Works features in a John Betjeman BBC film, John Betjeman Discovers Leeds, made in 1968 about Leeds city architecture.

In late 2009 the building was opened as an arts centre, with an initial exhibition and tour as part of Leeds Light Night on 9 October.

The building is referenced in the poem "A Wider View" by Seni Seneviratne, which is part of the Worlds and Lives AQA Anthology for the AQA English Literature GCSE specification.

It also featured in the second episode of the third series of Leeds-based TV series DCI Banks.

== See also ==
- Grade I listed buildings in West Yorkshire
- Listed buildings in Leeds (City and Hunslet Ward - southern area)

== Bibliography ==
- Pilling, P. W. (1985). Hick Hargreaves and Co., The History of an Engineering Firm c. 1833 – 1939, a Study with Special Reference to Technological Change and Markets (Unpublished Doctoral Thesis). University of Liverpool.
