= A Biographical Dictionary of Railway Engineers =

1978 book by John Marshall

- Author: John Marshall
- Original title: A Biographical Dictionary of Railway Engineers
- Language: English
- Subject: Railway engineering
- Genre: Biographies
- Published: January 26, 1978
- Publisher: David & Charles, Newton Abbot
- Publication place: England
- Pages: 252
- ISBN: 0-7153-7489-3
- OCLC: 1001057275

A Biographical Dictionary of Railway Engineers is a book by the English historian John Marshall (1922–2008) which summarises the lives of more than 600 engineers from Europe and North America.

Each biographical entry is in summary form and concludes with a list of references. It includes an index, but no illustrations. A typical entry begins with the subject's birth and death dates, with places, and deals chronologically with the subject's railway career. Any writings by the subject are noted, and the concluding section gives page references to where the information came from, usually technical periodicals. The concluding index is of railway companies worldwide and notes the engineers who worked for them.

The second edition now covers 752 names. A review of it appears in Journal of Transport History, March 2004.

- 1978 edition pub. David & Charles, Newton Abbot. 252pp. ISBN 0-7153-7489-3
- 2003 edition pub. Railway and Canal Historical Society, Oxford. 206pp. ISBN 0-901461-22-9
