= Elmslie William Dallas =

Scottish artist, teacher and photographer (1809–1879)

- Born: 27 June 1809; London, England
- Died: 26 January 1879 (aged 69); Edinburgh, Scotland

Elmslie William Dallas FRSE (27 June 1809 – 26 January 1879) was a Scottish artist, teacher and photographer.

== Life ==
He was the second son of William Dallas (4 August 1773 - 14 February 1842) from Cantray, Inverness-shire, who worked at the insurers Lloyd's of London; and Sarah Day (1782 - 1862) from Dudley in England. Elmslie was born in London on 27 June 1809.

Elmslie was descended from Alexander Dallas of Cantray, Inverness-shire, his great great great grandfather. He went to school at Inverness Academy.

Dallas settled in Edinburgh, where he lived firstly at 125 Princes Street a house facing Edinburgh Castle.

He married late in life (1859) to Jane Fordyce Rose (c. 1832 - 3 March 1908). Jane Fordyce Rose was the daughter of James Rose, writer to the signet, of Dean Bank, Edinburgh.

== Art ==
He was admitted a student of the Royal Academy in 1831, leaving in 1834 with a gold medal and a travelling studentship.

Dallas's first picture, the interior of a Roman convent, hung in the Royal Academy in 1838. In 1840 he assisted Ludwig Grüner in the decoration of the garden pavilion at Buckingham Palace, painting a series of views of Melrose, Abbotsford, Loch Awe, Aros Castle, and Windermere Lake, in illustration of the writings of Walter Scott. In 1841–2 he first exhibited in the Royal Scottish Academy. His major pictures were highly studied interiors and medieval subjects. He also painted landscapes, notably of the Campagna.

His last picture was exhibited in 1858. For some years he was also a teacher in the Edinburgh School of Design there, until his retirement in 1858 on the affiliation of the school with the Science and Art Department.

== Death ==
He died on 26 January 1879 at Deanbank House in Stockbridge, Edinburgh.

His estate was valued at £766, 12 shillings and 4 pence.

He was buried in Greyfriars Kirkyard in Edinburgh.

== Works ==
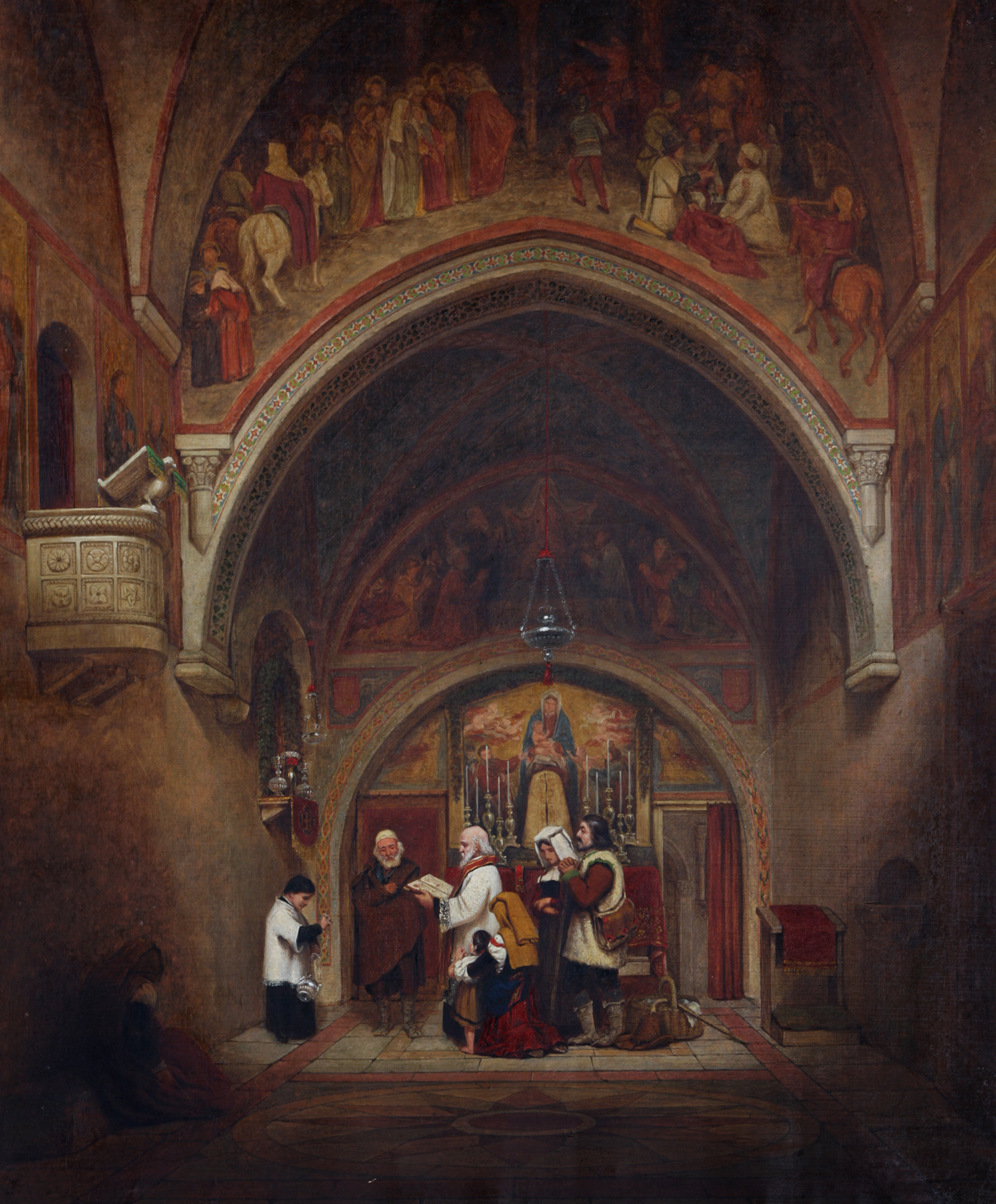
Interior of the Church of San Benedetto at Subiaco, Lazio, by Elmslie William Dallas

For teaching Dallas wrote a work on "Applied Geometry". In 1851 he was elected a Fellow of the Royal Society of Edinburgh, his proposer being Philip Kelland. In the Society he read papers on the structure of diatomacea, on crystallogenesis, and on the optics of lenses.
