= Moss Bank Park, Bolton =

Park in Bolton, Greater Manchester, England

Moss Bank Park
- Location within Greater Manchester
- Type: Public park
- Location: Bolton, Greater Manchester, England
- Coordinates: 53°35′46″N 2°28′00″W
- Area: 34.25 hectares (84.6 acres)
- Operator: Bolton MBC
- Status: Open all year

Moss Bank Park is a 34.25 hectares (84.6 acres) park in Bolton, Greater Manchester, England. It consists of open space, woodland, gardens and other facilities. Moss Bank Park has been awarded the Green Flag Standard in 2008 and 2009. The Green Flag Scheme is a national standard for public parks and green spaces that aims to raise standards across the UK. This award puts Moss Bank Park alongside Brighton Pier, London Zoo, Alton Towers and the Norfolk Broads.

Moss Bank Park formerly contained a small zoo and tropical butterfly house. The aviary is home to a historic tower that was originally built as an astronomical observatory by John Horrocks Ainsworth (d. 1864).
