= John Philipps Emslie =

British topographical artist and folklorist

John Philipps Emslie (1839 – 1913) was a British topographical artist and folklorist. He was the brother of Alfred Edward Emslie, another artist.

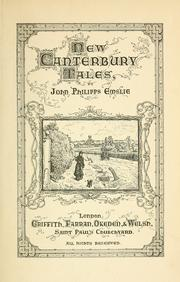
Front cover for New Canterbury Tales by John Philipps Emslie.

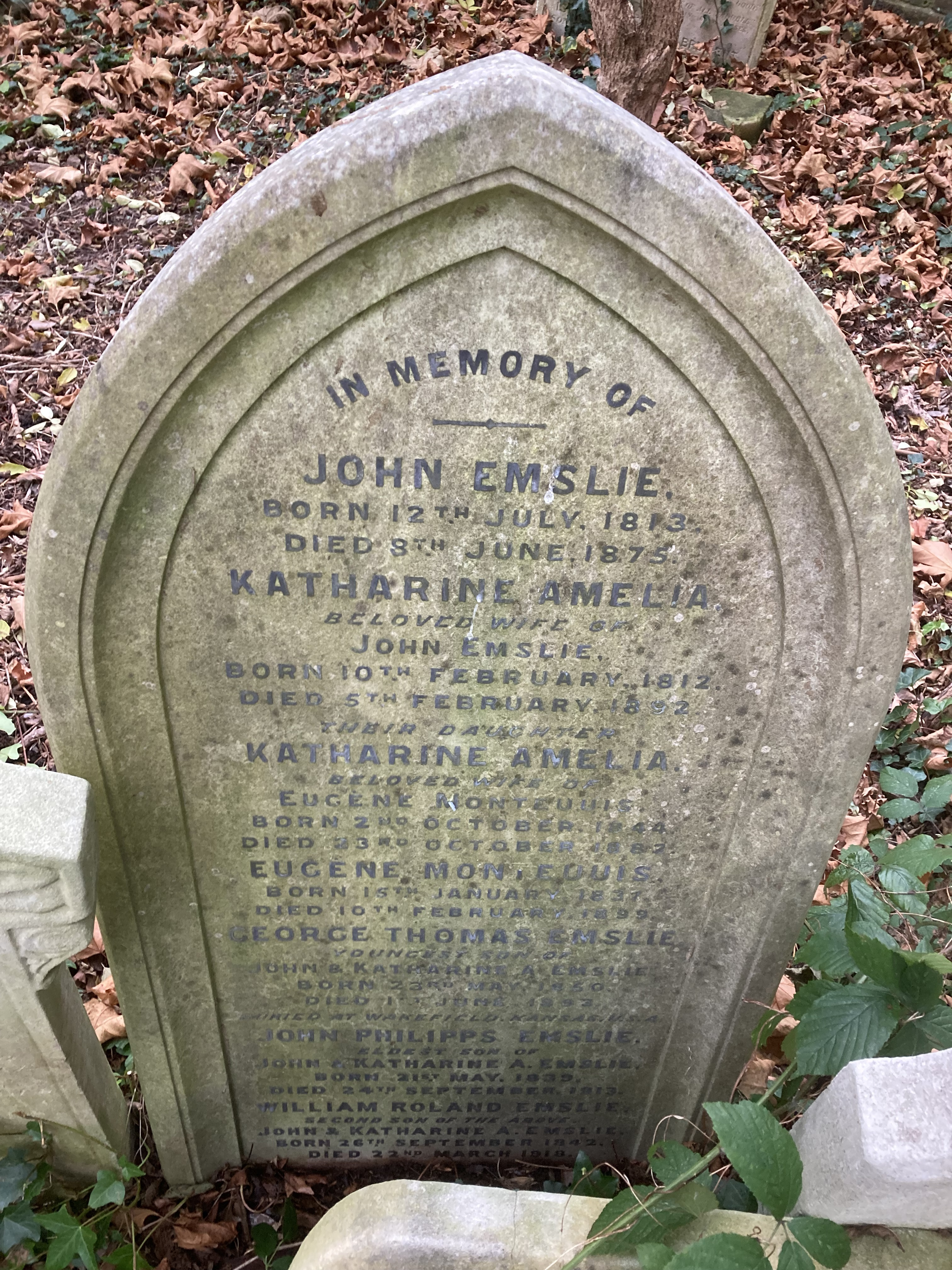
Family grave of John Philipps Emslie in Highgate Cemetery (west side)

== Biography ==
He was the son of engraver John Emslie. From 1854, Emslie studied at The Working Men's College, and was a student of Dante Gabriel Rossetti.

He became a topographical artist, and illustrated The Illustrated topical record of London vol. 9. in 1900.

He wrote and illustrated the New Canterbury Tales (Griffith, Farran, Okeden & Welsh) ca.1887.

Emslie was an original member of The Folklore Society and was a council member for that Society. He gathered local folklore from around England, making notes and topographical drawings.
