= Rosalie M. Emslie =

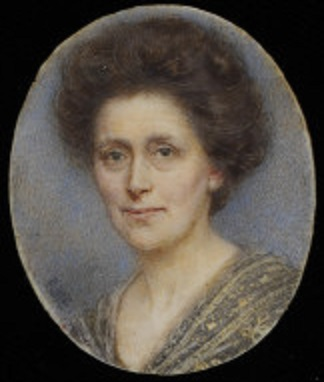
- Born: 12 March 1854; St Pancras, London, England
- Died: 8 January 1932 (aged 77); Otford, Kent, England
- Spouse: Alfred Edward Emslie
- Children: Rosalie Emslie

Rosalie Maria Emslie (née Watson), sometime Mrs. A. E. Emslie (12 March 1854 – 8 January 1932) was a British painter of miniature portraits.

Emslie was born in London and became proficient at watercolour painting and attended the Royal Academy Schools. She worked in London where she met and married her husband, the painter Alfred Edward Emslie. She exhibited at the Royal Academy, the New Water-Colour Society and the Salon de la Société Nationale from 1888 to 1912. Her miniatures are in various collections, most notably the Victoria and Albert Museum that holds her self-portrait, and the Royal Society of Miniature Painters, Sculptors & Gravers.

Emslie died in Otford, Kent. Her daughter, Rosalie Emslie, also became a painter.
