= Alfred Edward Emslie =

English painter

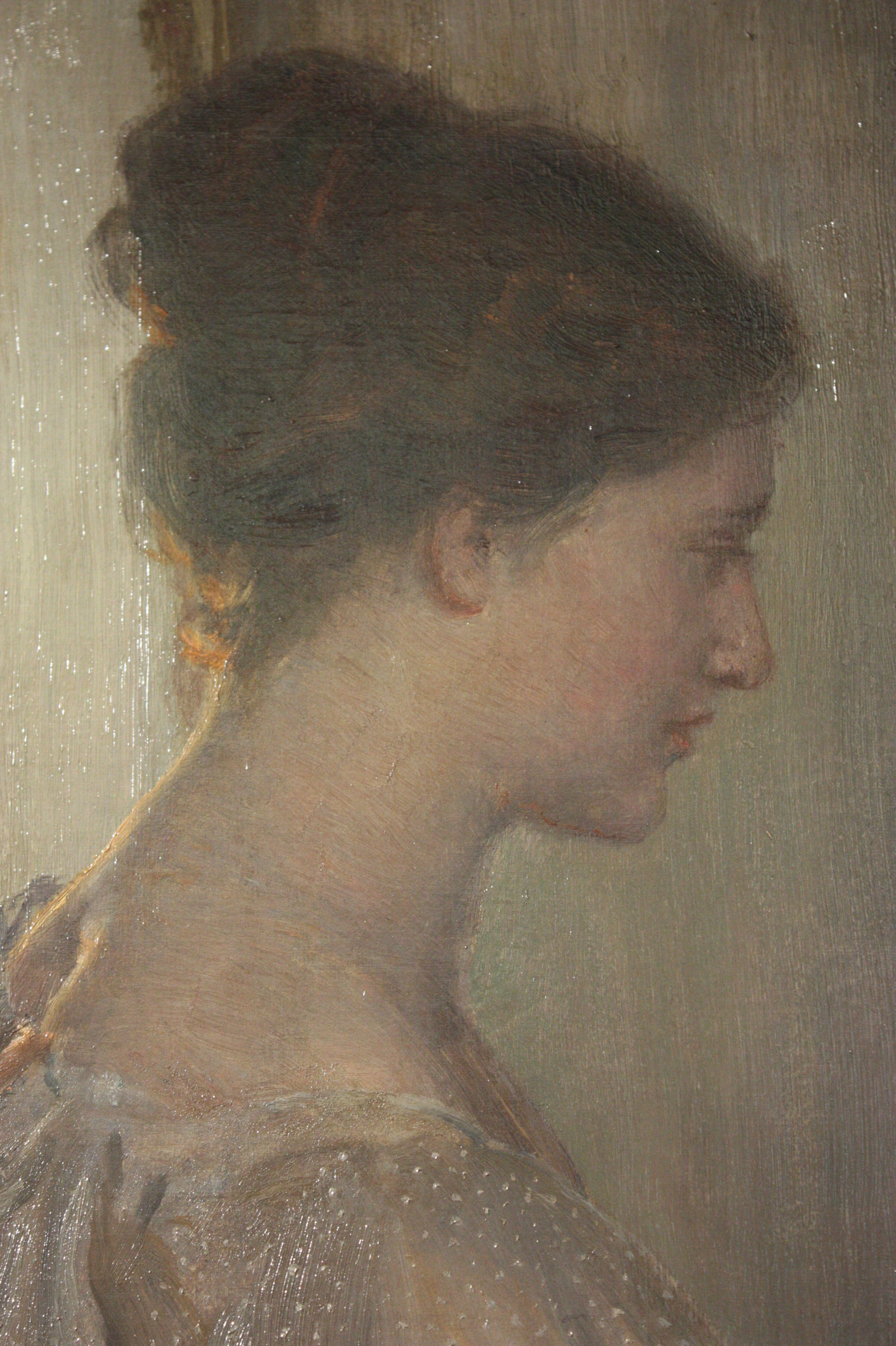
A Sonata of Beethoven (detail), by A E Emslie, 1912

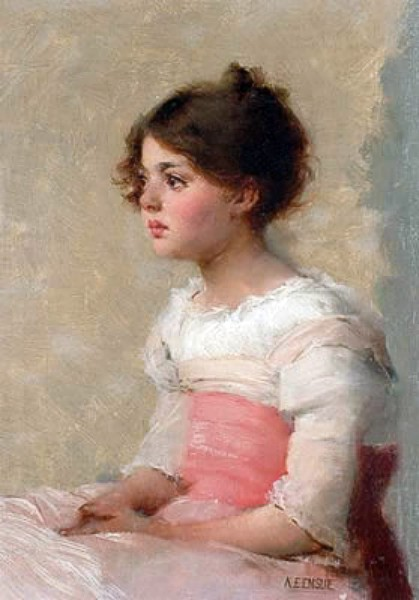
"Portrait of young girl" by Emslie

Alfred Edward Emslie (London 1848–1918) was a British genre and portrait painter, and photographer, living at The Studio, 34, Finchley Road, N. W.

Emslie was born in London, and was the son of the engraver, John Emslie (1813–1875), and brother of John Philipps Emslie (1839–1913), the figure painter. He studied at the Royal Academy Schools and then in Paris at the École des Beaux Arts. He married the miniature painter Rosalie M. Emslie and they had a daughter, Rosalie Emslie, who became a figure, portrait and landscape painter. Emslie turned increasingly to portraiture later in life. He had a great passion for the Orient, and spent three months exploring Japan. Emslie also worked in New York and contributed illustrations to Illustrated London News. He was an elected an associate of the Royal Society of Painters in Water Colours in 1888 and a member of the Royal Society of Portrait Painters in 1892.

Emslie exhibited in London at the Royal Academy between 1869 and 1897. Between 1897 and 1901, he painted a series of pictures illustrative of the theme "God is Love". Nine large oil paintings from this series were exhibited at Towneley Hall in Burnley, Lancashire from May 1904 until April 1905. He also exhibited at the Royal Institute of Painters in Water Colours, Royal Institute of Oil Painters, Royal Watercolour Society, Royal Miniature Society, Grosvenor Gallery, Dudley Gallery, New Gallery, Fine Art Society and Agnew and Sons Gallery as well as at the Royal Society of British Artists. Also at the Royal Birmingham Society of Artists, Glasgow Institute of the Fine Arts, The Royal Scottish Society of Painters in Watercolour, Leicester Galleries, Walker Art Gallery in Liverpool and Manchester Art Gallery.

He won a bronze medal at the Exposition Universelle in 1889.
