= Rosalie Emslie =

English artist (1891-1977)

- Born: 26 January 1891; London, England
- Died: 1977 (aged 85–86)
- Education: Royal Academy Schools
- Known for: Painting

Rosalie Emslie (26 January 1891 – 1977) was a British artist known for her landscape and portrait paintings.

== Biography ==
Emslie was born in London into an artistic family. Her grandfather was the engraver John Emslie while her father was the artist Alfred Edward Emslie and her mother was the noted miniature painter Rosalie M. Emslie. Although born in London, the family home being in Poland Street in Westminster, after 1901 she lived for a time in Otford in Kent with her mother and aunt. The younger Rosalie Emslie was privately educated before attending the Royal Academy Schools between 1913 and 1918. She went on to study in Spain, Italy and France.

Emslie exhibited on a regular basis at the Royal Academy and with the New English Art Club and the Society of Women Artists. She was elected a member of the Royal Society of British Artists in 1922. Emslie also exhibited in America and Italy. For a time she lived in Petersfield in Hampshire and then in Reigate with the artist Florence May Asher.
