= 1876 Leeds by-election =

UK Parliamentary by-election

The 1876 Leeds by-election was fought on 15 August 1876. The by-election was fought due to the resignation of the incumbent Liberal MP, Robert Meek Carter. It was won by the Liberal candidate John Barran.
