= Julia Anne Elliott =

English poet and hymnwriter

- Born: Julia Anne Marshall; 1809; Hallsteads, Watermillock, Ullswater, England
- Died: 3 November 1841 (aged 31–32); England
- Occupations: poet; hymnwriter
- Spouse: Henry Venn Elliott (m. 1833)
- Children: 5
- Parent: John Marshall
- Relatives: William, John, and James Garth (brothers); Charlotte Elliott (sister-in-law)
- Writing career
- Genre: hymns
- Notable works: "Hail, thou bright and sacred morn"

Signature
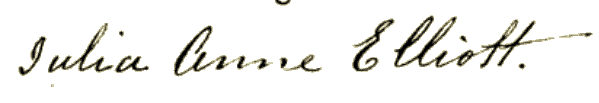

Julia Anne Elliott (née Marshall; 1809–1841) was an English poet and hymnwriter. Elliott wrote little, but wrote well. With rarely an exception, Elliott's hymns bear the stamp of refined poetic taste, and all of them possess a deep religious feeling.

== Biography ==
Julia Anne Marshall was born at Hallsteads, Watermillock, Ullswater, England, in 1809. She was a daughter of the industrialist, John Marshall, Esq. He married Jane Pollard, daughter of William Pollard, a Halifax wool-stapler and linen-merchant. Her three spinster sisters (Ann, Catharine and Eleanor) moved to a house named Old Church, near Hallsteads, by 1829. Jane had met Dorothy Wordsworth while Dorothy was at school in Halifax, and there are references to visits to Hallsteads and Old Church in Dorothy and William Wordsworth's correspondence.

Marshall and Jane had eleven children. Their eldest son William was MP for Beverley, Carlisle and East Cumberland Their second son John was MP for Leeds 1832–1835, and third son James Garth held the same seat 1847–1852. The fourth son, Henry Cowper, was Mayor of Leeds 1842–1843.

In 1827, being on a visit with her father to Brighton, she worshipped at St. Mary's, of which the Rev. Henry Venn Elliott, the brother of Charlotte Elliott, was the Perpetual Curate. An acquaintance between the two was thus formed, resulting in their marriage, October 31, 1833. She greatly endeared herself, in this happy relationship, to the people of the parish, and especially to her husband's family. Charlotte Elliott, in particular, became ardently attached to her.

She published Poems (with: Poems on Sacred Subjects.) in 1832. Her poetic taste and skill were evinced in several hymns contributed (1835) to a volume of Psalms and Hymns for Public Worship, compiled, by her husband, which included "We love Thee, Lord, yet not alone." She was not acknowledged until the third printing (1839) when her initials were added in the index. Some of her religious poems are given in Lord Selborne's Book of Praise. Two hymns are included in Hymns and Songs of Praise for Public and Social Worship, edited by Roswell Dwight Hitchcock, Zachary Eddy, Philip Schaff, 1874.

"Hail, thou bright and sacred morn" was a Sunday morning hymn addressed to Father, Son, and Holy Spirit. According to Brownlie (1899), Elliott's reputation rested upon it as her one good hymn. Smith (1903) and Hatfield (1884) remarked that it was Hyde's most familiar hymn in the U.S.

Smith (1903) remarked that Elliot's best hymn -fine in the attractiveness of its theme, and great in its poetic strength- is that on "The Love of Christ", beginning with the line, "We love Thee, Lord, yet not alone." She also wrote a very beautiful evening hymn: "On the Dewy Breath of Even", which was popular in England, but was little known in the U.S.

According to Benson (1915), Elliott is best-remembered for her "Great Creator, who this day."

Julia Anne Elliott died of scarlet fever on 3 November 1841, her fifth child, Julius, having been born on 24 October 1841. Her death was followed by that of their eldest son, Henry Venn, from the effects of a fall, on 2 June 1848. The second son, Charles Alfred, became a distinguished member of the Indian civil service. Julius Marshall, the third son, was killed on the Schreckhorn 27 July 1869.

== Selected works ==
- Poems (with: Poems on Sacred Subjects.)., 1832 (text)

=== Hymns ===
- "Bright and Sacred Morn.
- "Great Creator, who this day."
- "Hail, thou bright and sacred morn."
- "On the Dewy Breath of Even."
- "We love Thee, Lord, yet not alone."
