= Douglastown (disambiguation) =

Douglastown may refer to:

== Canada ==
- Douglastown, Ontario, part of Fort Erie, Ontario
- Douglastown, New Brunswick, a neighborhood in Miramichi, New Brunswick
- Douglastown, part of Gaspé, Quebec

== United Kingdom ==
- Douglastown, a hamlet in Angus, Scotland
