= William St James Wheelhouse =

William St James Wheelhouse (1821 – 8 March 1886) was a British barrister and Conservative Party politician.

The son of James Wheelhouse of Snaith, he was called to the bar at Gray's Inn in May 1844, and practised on the Northern Circuit.

He was elected at the 1868 general election as one of the three Members of Parliament (MPs) for Leeds, and was re-elected in 1874. He was defeated at the 1880 general election by his fellow-Conservative William Jackson, and was unsuccessful when he stood again at the 1885 general election in the new single-seat Western division of Leeds.

Parliament of the United Kingdom
Preceded by Edward Baines; George Skirrow Beecroft	Member of Parliament for Leeds; 1868 – 1880; With: Edward Baines to 1874; Robert Meek Carter to 1876; Robert Tennant from 1874; John Barran from 1876	Succeeded by John Barran; William Ewart Gladstone; William Jackson
