= Hatfield Peverel Priory =

Monastery in Essex, England

Coordinates: 51.768942°N 0.602896°E

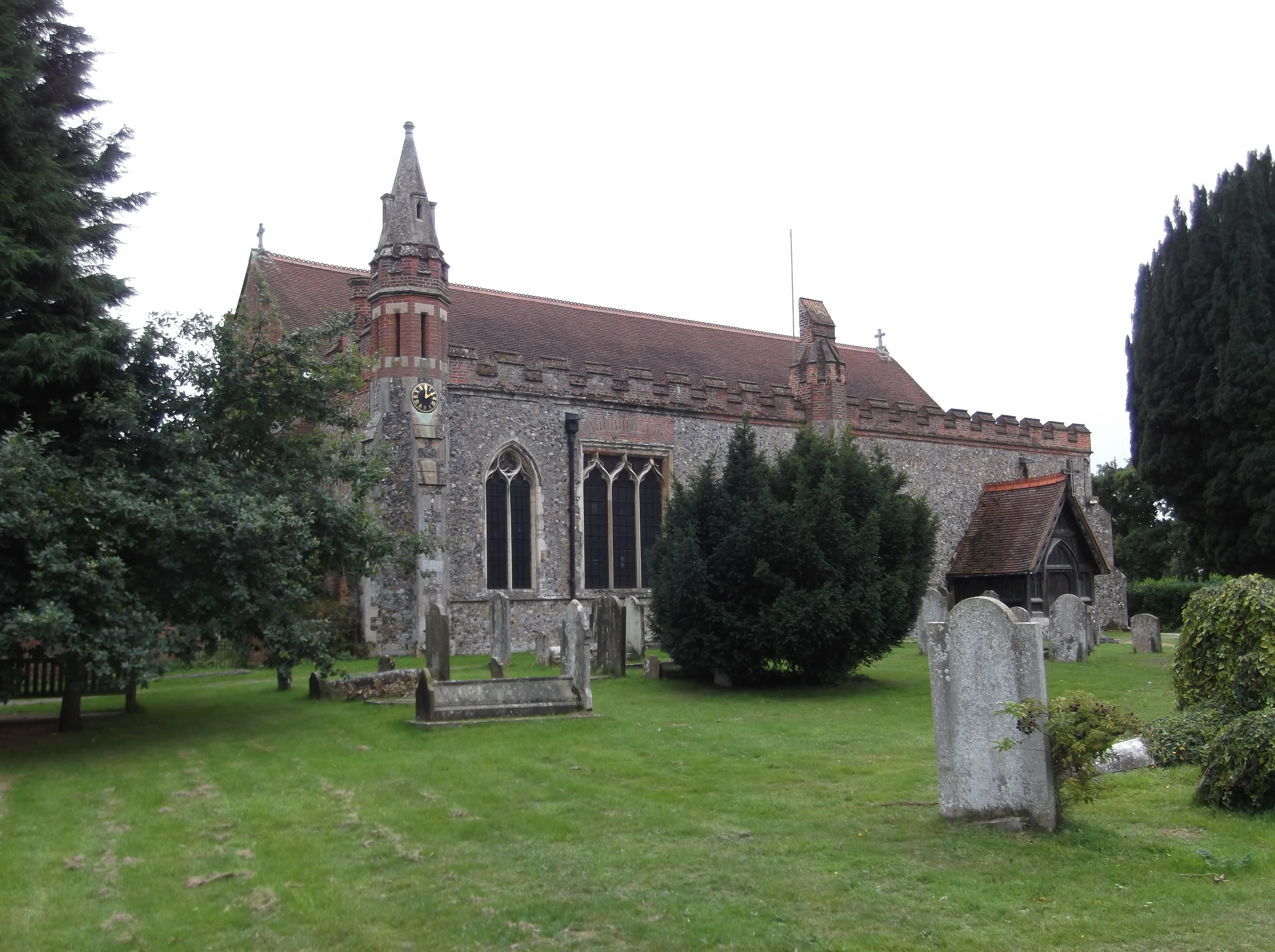
St Andrew's Parish Church, Hatfield Peverel – former conventual church of Hatfield Priory

Hatfield Peverel Priory (also known as Hatfield Priory) was a Benedictine priory in Essex, England, founded as a secular college before 1087 and converted into priory as a cell of St Albans by William Peverel ante 1100. It is in the English Heritage Register of Parks and Gardens of Special Historic Interest in England and is located on the south side of the village of Hatfield Peverel, about 5 miles north-east of Chelmsford. At the Dissolution of the Monasteries, a timber-frame structure dominated the property.

According to tradition the priory was founded by the Saxon Ingelrica, wife of Ranulph Peverel and reputed to be the mistress of William the Conqueror, to atone for her sins. The parish church, St Andrew's (Church of England) is the surviving fragment of the Norman priory church nave.

The property was acquired by the Wright family when John Wright, a coachmaker, first landed his family in Essex in 1764. The current house, in a park designed by Richard Woods in 1765 and built in 1769, stands on a rise of land overlooking the Chelmer valley. The property passed to Wright's son, John Wright II, who died in 1796 without a male issue. The estate then passed under entail to his nephew (i.e. his sister's son) Peter Luard, who took the name and arms of Wright as required under the will. Peter (Luard) Wright, elder brother of William Wright Luard of The Lodge, Witham (and father of Admiral William Luard), occupied and expanded the property considerably. John Wright V, having suffered financial difficulties, in 1912 let the estate to Philip Charles Tennant (1867–1936), 7th son of Robert Tennant (1828-1900) of Chapel House in the parish of Conistone, Yorkshire, Member of Parliament for Leeds from 1874 to 1880. Tennant eventually purchased Hatfield Priory in 1928, following the death of the widow of John Wright V. In 1935, one year before his death, Tennant sold it to the Marianhill Mission, a Catholic lay brotherhood, which made it their European headquarters until their closure in 1972, when the property, now with derelict grounds, was purchased as a speculation by Dolph Claydon, a property developer, who quickly sold it on to Derek Marriott who used it as a school, which closed in 1979. In 2000 the property was owned by Adrian and Fiona Cowell, who have undertaken much restoration to house and grounds.

== See also ==
- List of monastic houses in Essex
- List of English abbeys, priories and friaries serving as parish churches
