= John Marshall (industrialist) =

British businessman and politician

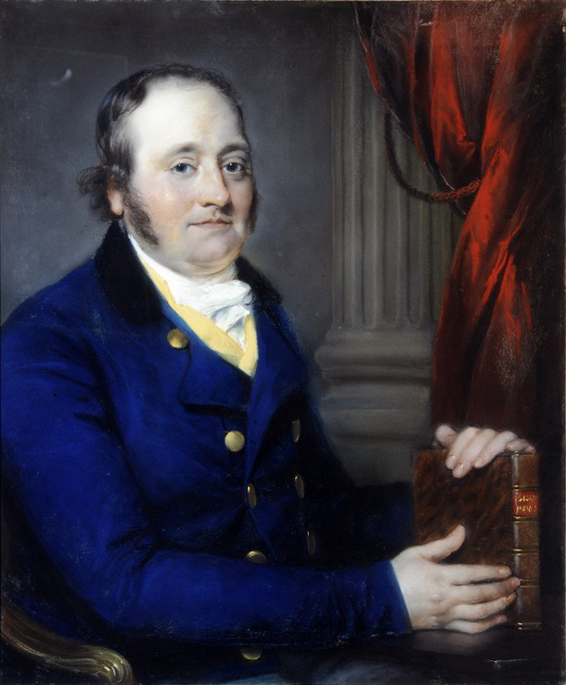
- 1802 portrait by John Russell
- Born: 27 July 1765; Briggate, Leeds, England
- Died: 6 June 1845 (aged 79); Hallsteads, Watermillock, England
- Occupations: Textile Industrialist; Politician
- Known for: Marshall's Mill; Temple Works

John Marshall (27 July 1765 – 6 June 1845) was a British businessman and politician from Leeds, West Yorkshire, England.

== Life ==
Marshall was born at 1, Briggate, Leeds, the son of Jeremiah (1731–1787), a linen draper, and his wife Mary (1728–1799), whose father was John Cowper of Yeadon. He was their only child who survived infancy.

Marshall joined the family business when he was seventeen. Five years later his father died and Marshall became the controlling partner in the company. He inherited a new house, a warehouse, and £7,500. Shortly before his father's death, Marshall heard that two men from Darlington, John Kendrew, a glass-grinder, and Thomas Porthouse, a watchmaker, had registered a patent for a new flax spinning machine. Marshall visited the men and purchased the right to make copies of their invention. He spent much of the next decade trying to improve the performance of the machines but found little success until he recruited engineer Matthew Murray.

In 1790, he bought the freehold of an acre of land on Water Lane in Holbeck near Leeds. This was an ideal location for a mill because of its proximity to the Leeds and Liverpool Canal and the Aire and Calder Navigation. Here, between 1791 and 1792, he constructed Marshall's Mill, a six-storey water-powered mill using water drawn from the nearby Hol Beck to spin yarn. Marshall was able to create enough power to run 7,000 spindles employing 2,000 factory workers. Only a generation earlier, the making of hand-spun yarn had been a traditional Yorkshire cottage industry.

In 1796, he was a partner (with Thomas Benyon, Benjamin Benyon, and Charles Bage) in building a flax mill at Ditherington near Shrewsbury, which was the first iron framed building in the world.

Adjacent to Marshall's Mill, he built his most ambitious project: Temple Works flax mill between 1836 and 1840. Temple Works was based on the Temple of Edfu at Horus in Egypt, with a chimney designed in the style of an obelisk; at the time, it was said to be the largest single room in the world. Employees at Temple Works worked 72 hours a week, 40% of the people employed by Marshall were young women aged thirteen to twenty, and about 20% were under thirteen. Conditions in the flax mills of that era were extremely hot and humid because of the number of workers and the fact that humid conditions made the flax easier to work. Despite the age of his workers and the conditions in his factories, Marshall is considered to be one of the most liberal factory owners of the Industrial Revolution. In his factories, overseers were not allowed to use corporal punishment on the workers. Younger children were encouraged to attend day school, and older children were given free education on Monday afternoons.

Marshall was involved in the founding of the Leeds Mechanics' Institute and the Leeds Philosophical and Literary Society. In 1826, he began a campaign to establish Leeds University. Marshall also gave money to the Leeds Library.

In 1821 Marshall was appointed Sheriff of Cumberland and in 1826 was elected a Member of Parliament for Yorkshire in the House of Commons. In 1830, he resigned his seat due to ill health and retired to the country home he had built in 1815, Hallsteads, near Watermillock on the shore of Ullswater in the Lake District. The house is currently used as the Ullswater Outward Bound Centre.

Marshall's estate, after his death at Hallsteads in 1845, was assessed variously as between £1.5 million and £2.5 million. He was buried in the church adjoining Hallsteads.

== Family ==
Marshall married Jane Pollard, daughter of William Pollard, a Halifax wool-stapler and linen-merchant. Her three spinster sisters (Ann, Catharine and Eleanor) moved to a house named Old Church, near Hallsteads, by 1829. Jane had met Dorothy Wordsworth while Dorothy was at school in Halifax, and there are references to visits to Hallsteads and Old Church in Dorothy and William Wordsworth's correspondence.

Marshall and Jane had eleven children. Their eldest son William was MP for Beverley, Carlisle and East Cumberland Their second son John was MP for Leeds 1832–1835, and third son James Garth held the same seat 1847–1852. The fourth son, Henry Cowper, was Mayor of Leeds 1842–1843. Their daughter Julia Anne (1809–1841) married Rev. Henry Venn Elliott in 1833 and wrote the words for several hymns in her husband's publication Psalms and Hymns for Public, Private and Social Worship (1835): she was not acknowledged until the third printing (1839) when her initials were added in the index.

== See also ==
- Peter Fairbairn
- John Farey Jr.

Parliament of the United Kingdom
Preceded by Viscount Milton; James Stuart-Wortley	Member of Parliament for Yorkshire; 1826–1830; With: Viscount Milton; William Duncombe; Richard Fountayne Wilson	Succeeded by William Duncombe; Viscount Morpeth; Richard Bethell; Henry Brougham
