= William Jackson, 1st Baron Allerton =

British politician

The Right Honourable The Lord Allerton PC FRS
- Photograph of Jackson

Chief Secretary for Ireland
- In office 9 November 1891 – 11 August 1892
- Monarch: Victoria
- Prime Minister: The Marquess of Salisbury
- Preceded by: Arthur Balfour
- Succeeded by: John Morley

Personal details
- Born: 16 February 1840 Otley, Yorkshire
- Died: 4 April 1917 (aged 77) London
- Party: Conservative
- Spouse: Grace Tempest (d. 1901)
- Children: 3, including Stanley

William Lawies Jackson, 1st Baron Allerton, PC, FRS (16 February 1840 – 4 April 1917) was a British businessman and Conservative politician.

== Background and education ==
Born in Otley, near Leeds, England, Jackson was the son of William Jackson, a leather merchant and tanner. He was educated at the Moravian School.

== Business career ==
Jackson took over his father's business. His Times obituary reads, "Early in his commercial career he devoted his energies to tanning, and was prominent in the leather industry." He was also Chairman of the Great Northern Railway.

== Political career ==
Jackson was elected to Leeds Borough Council in 1859. He entered national politics when he unsuccessfully contested Leeds in an 1876 by-election. He was successful in being elected for the same constituency in 1880. He switched to the Northern Division of Leeds in 1885, and he would represent that constituency until he was raised to the peerage in 1902. In December 1885, a complimentary dinner was given in Leeds to Jackson by the Leeds and County Conservative Club with C.F. Tetley and J.W. Middleton being amongst the gentleman reportedly present. Jackson served two separate periods as Financial Secretary to the Treasury (1885–1886 and 1886–1891), being created a Privy Counsellor on 30 June 1890. He was then appointed Chief Secretary for Ireland in 1891, serving in that position for one year, although he did not sit in the Cabinet. He was Lord Mayor of Leeds in 1895. In the 1902 Coronation Honours list it was announced that he would receive a barony, and he was raised to the peerage as Baron Allerton, of Chapel Allerton, in the County of York, on 17 July 1902. He took the oath and his seat in the House of Lords a week later, on 21 July. Lord Allerton chaired several institutions before his death on 4 April 1917.

== Family ==
Jackson married Grace, daughter of George Tempest, of Otley, on 10 October 1860. His elder son George succeeded him as Baron Allerton. His younger son Francis Stanley was an international cricketer and had a military and political career. Jackson and his wife Grace were both buried at St Matthew's Church, Chapel Allerton.

== Arms ==
Coat of arms of William Jackson, 1st Baron Allerton
Crest A horse Or holding in the mouth an ear of wheat slipped Vert and resting the foreleg on three annulets as in the arms. Escutcheon Per chevron Gules and Or in chief two suns in splendour of the last and in base three annulets one and two interlaced of the first. Supporters On either side a horse Sable collared Vair and charged on the shoulder with three annulets interlaced two and one Or. Motto Essayez

Parliament of the United Kingdom
Preceded by Robert Tennant; John Barran; William Wheelhouse	Member of Parliament for Leeds; 1880 – 1885; With: John Barran, 1876–1885; William Ewart Gladstone, April–May 1880; Herbert Gladstone, 1880–1885	Constituency abolished
New constituency	Member of Parliament for Leeds North; 1885 – 1902	Succeeded by Sir Rowland Barran
Political offices
Preceded by Sir Matthew White Ridley, Bt	Financial Secretary to the Treasury; 1886	Succeeded by Henry Fowler
Preceded by Henry Fowler	Financial Secretary to the Treasury; 1886 – 1891	Succeeded by John Eldon Gorst
Preceded by Arthur Balfour	Chief Secretary for Ireland; 1891 – 1892	Succeeded by John Morley
Peerage of the United Kingdom
New creation	Baron Allerton; 1902 – 1917	Succeeded by George Jackson
