= Flax mill =

Textile mill processing flax

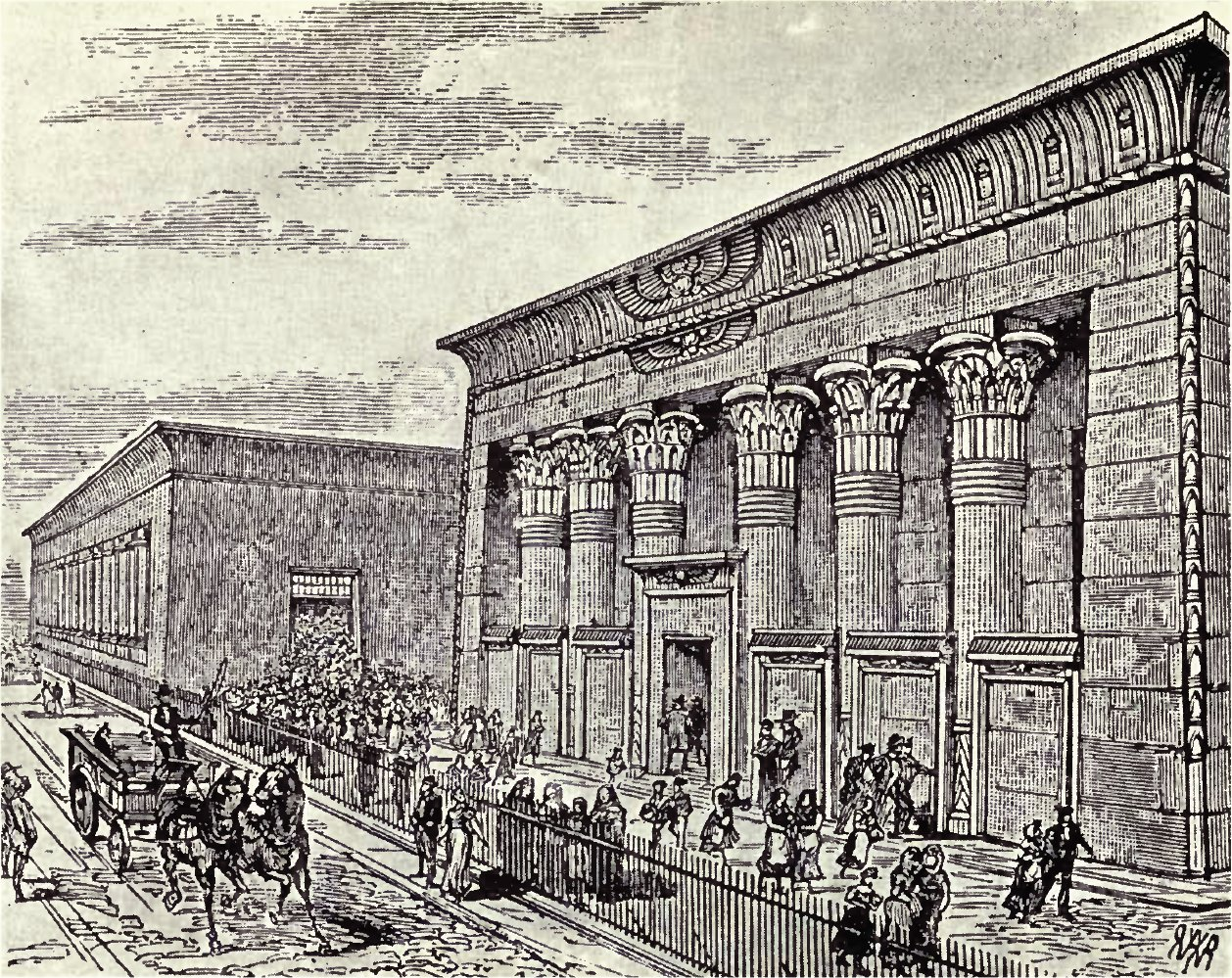
Exterior of Marshall's flax-mill at Holbeck, Leeds, probably circa 1843

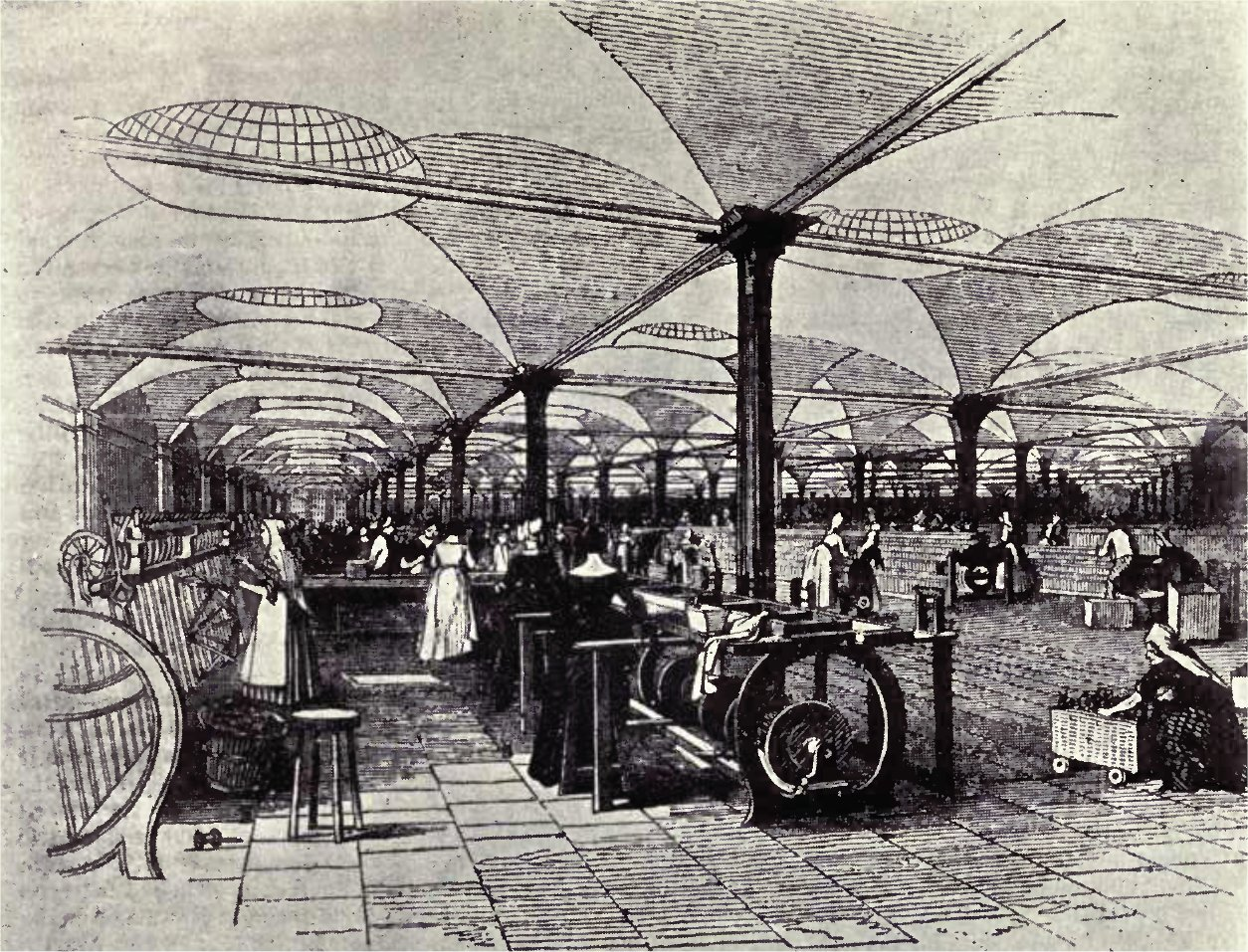
Interior of Marshall's flax-mill

Flax mills are mills which process flax. The earliest mills were developed for spinning yarn for the linen industry.

John Kendrew (an optician) and Thomas Porthouse (a clockmaker), both of Darlington developed the process from Richard Arkwright's water frame, and patented it in 1787. The first machine was set up in Low Mill on the River Skerne at Darlington, which Kendrew used to grind glass. They then each set up a mill of their own, Kendrew near Haughton-le-Skerne and Porthouse near Coatham Mundeville, both on the same river.

They also granted permits, enabling others to build similar mills, including in northeast Scotland, where early mills included those in Douglastown, Bervie and Dundee. Others were built in Leeds. Matthew Murray moved from Darlington to set up a mill at Adel near Leeds, where he built an improved spinning machine for John Marshall. In 1791, Marshall built another mill in Holbeck near Leeds. Murray later became a noted textile engineer as a partner in Fenton, Murray and Wood.

Ditherington Flax Mill in Shrewsbury, built in 1797, is the world's first iron-framed building, and hence a forerunner of all skyscrapers.

In 1805, Malleny Mill was built on the eastern edge of Balerno to process Flax.

The last flax mill that was operational in the United Kingdom was located in Gourdon, Aberdeenshire, and closed on 30 May 1997.

== See also ==
Flax mills in New Zealand
