= Edward Baines (1774–1848) =

Newspaper editor, author, and politician

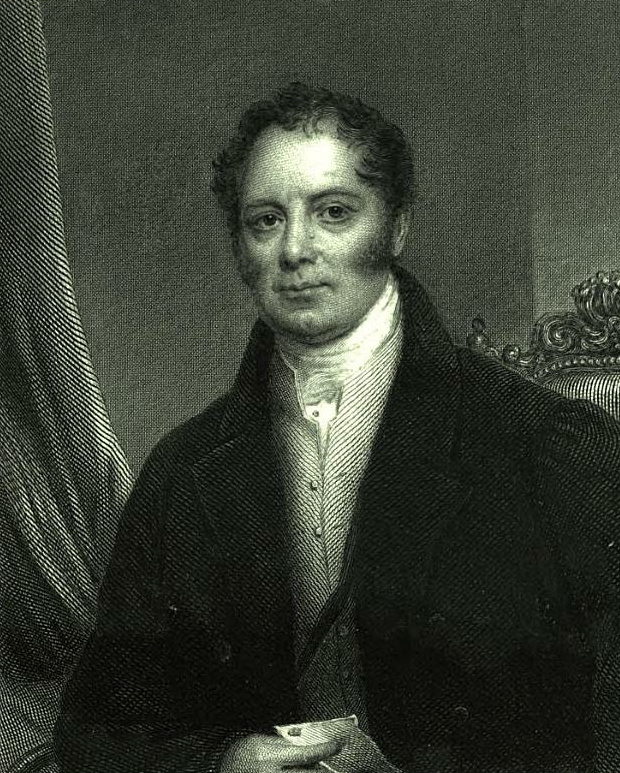
- Born: 1774; Walton-le-Dale, near Preston, Lancashire
- Died: 3 August 1848 (aged 73–74)
- Occupations: Journalist, Politician
- Spouse: Charlotte Talbot
- Children: Matthew Talbot Baines (1799–1860); Edward Baines Jnr. (1800–1890); Thomas Baines (1806–1881); Margaret Baines (d. 1891); Charlotte (1800–1890)

Edward Baines (1774–1848) was the editor and proprietor of the Leeds Mercury (which, by his efforts, became the leading provincial paper in England), politician, and the author of historical and geographic works of reference. On his death in 1848, the Leeds Intelligencer (a rival of the Mercury, and its political opponent for over forty years) described his as "one who has earned for himself an indisputable title to be numbered among the notable men of Leeds".

Of his character and physical appearance it remarked: "Mr Baines had great industry and perseverance, as well as patience and resolution; and with those he possessed pleasing manners and address, - that debonair and affable bearing, which conciliated even those who might have felt that they had reason to regard him as an enemy… In person he was of a firm well-built frame, rather above the average stature; his features were regular, his expression of countenance frank and agreeable; and he retained his personal comeliness as well as his vivacity and suavity of manners to the last".

== Early years ==
Edward Baines was born in 1774 at Walton-le-Dale, near Preston, Lancashire. He was educated at Hawkshead Grammar School (where Wordsworth was a contemporary), and then in the lower school of the grammar school in Preston. He then became a weaver, but at the age of sixteen he was apprenticed for seven years to a printer in Preston. In the fifth year of his apprenticeship, he terminated it and moved to Leeds, where he finished his apprenticeship with the printer of the Leeds Mercury, one of two Leeds weekly newspapers. In later years, both Baines and his political opponents would have it that he arrived in Leeds with little more than the clothes on his back, (Note: But where Baines and his admirers thought ambition (or disagreement with his master) the reason for his move some of his opponents (such as Richard Oastler) said he was escaping a pregnant fiancee in Preston.) but on completion of his apprenticeship he set up his own printworks with the aid of a loan of £100 from his father. He became a member of the Leeds Reasoning Society (a discussion group which eschewed religious or political issues) and of the local subscription library. He became attracted to non-conformism, and after attending the chapels of both Unitarians and Congregationalists settled for the latter (although he did not formally become a member until 1840). (He married Charlotte Talbot in 1798; she and their children were also lifelong non-conformists, with the exception of the eldest son Matthew Talbot Baines who became an Anglican, and therefore was able to take a degree at Cambridge.)

== Journalism ==
=== Revitalisation of Leeds Mercury ===
In 1801, he was approached to start a third Leeds newspaper to support the interests of Dissent and Reform; the Mercury was not a reliable friend of Dissent and the leading paper, the Leeds Intelligencer, was avowedly opposed. In the event, the owner of the Mercury offered to sell up, and with the help of loans from like-minded supporters Baines bought the paper for £1,552. The paper he acquired was published every Saturday, cost sixpence (including fourpence newspaper tax) for four pages, and had a circulation of 700–800. Baines set about improving content and circulation. Baines rapidly introduced material reflecting the commercial interests of Leeds: regular agricultural and commercial reports, shipping news (from Hull and from Liverpool) and a report of the state of the London markets. Political affairs were not neglected; a digest of parliamentary proceedings in the previous week was also added. The Mercury soon outsold the Intelligencer, and by 1807 it was selling up to 3,000 copies in a good week. Production methods were improved and outclassed those of the Intelligencer, with new fonts allowing more text per page, and cast-iron handpresses allowing clearer printing than wooden ones. He encouraged "letters to the editor" and was amongst the first provincial newspaper editors to make editorial comment a routine feature of their paper. His leading articles could be vigorous and pointed. In the first Mercury under new ownership, Baines promised "Our Paper shall never be made the Vehicle of Party or Personal Abuse", but within the year the Mercury was exchanging insults with the Cambridge Intelligencer, which accused the Mercury of dancing to the Government's tune with vague reports of (and editorial comment deploring) nocturnal meetings of the disaffected. In 1805 a new editor of the Leeds Intelligencer attacked the Mercury as "bespattered with ... sedition"; together with Baines' heated response this initiated a long-lasting state of mutual incivility between the two papers which makes each an unreliable source for the other's deeds and motives. (Note: For example, in 1817 Baines spoke ('after acknowledging that spontaneous burst of public favour which had called him forth' according to the report in the Mercury) at a Leeds meeting drawing up a loyal address to the Prince Regent. The report of the speech finished with an assertion to which the next Intelligencer (3 March)responded at length, inviting its readers to "read your assertion that "THE DELIVERY OF THAT SPEECH … MADE THE PROPRIETOR OF THE INTELLIGENCER, WITH THE PUSILLANIMITY FOR WHICH HE IS REMARKABLE, SHRINK BACK IN SILENT DISMAY!" - let them read this assertion; and then let them have mercy on the feelings of Mr Baines, if he has any, when they are told (what is the fact) that the Proprietor of the Intelligencer had actually retired from the Meeting, immediately after the Address was carried, long before Mr Baines began to speak - never dreaming, impudent as the "factious editor" of the Mercury is, that at such a meeting, even he could have the effrontery to intrude his well-known canting trash upon the public!") According to counsel in an 1820 libel case "When there was a dearth of political news, nothing was more common for one Editor to attack another, and the public appeared to find amusement in their squabbles". The Mercury sent its own reporters to significant events outside its circulation area, such as York Assizes: a Mercury reporter was present and taking shorthand notes at the giant Reform meeting at Manchester which became the Peterloo massacre. That reporter was Baines' second son Edward, who from 1820 onwards progressively took over the everyday running of the Mercury as his father became more involved in local politics. Not only did the Mercury displace the Intelligencer as the leading Leeds paper, by 1832 it could be described by another provincial paper as "the leading provincial paper in England".

=== "The spy Oliver" ===
On 14 June 1817, the first edition of the Mercury reported that ten Yorkshire men were held in Wakefield jail accused of planning insurrection. It noted that they had been arrested the previous week at a meeting near Dewsbury between them and a Mr Oliver, who had represented himself as a delegate from a central organising committee in London; its readers would probably infer that 'Oliver' was a spy. Following the arrest of the men, there had been disturbances at Huddersfield and Ossett. The second edition made three further charges, supported by the evidence of respectable named moderate reformers: firstly that 'Oliver' had repeatedly urged one of them a Dewsbury bookseller, to attend the meeting: secondly, that 'Oliver' had been seen by another of them at Wakefield after the arrests, and with no satisfactory explanation why he was still at liberty: thirdly that he had been seen in conversation with a liveried man-servant of General Byng, the army officer responsible for internal security in the North of England, the man-servant later saying that on a previous occasion he had driven Oliver from Byng's house to Wakefield to catch a coach. The Mercury made no charge against Byng, but asked who were the employers of 'this double-distilled traitor' and called upon local magistrates to investigate. "On the 16th the exposure of Oliver in the Leeds Mercury was read in both houses of parliament, by Earl Grey in the lords and Sir Francis Burdett in the commons. A strong sensation was produced; and those members, supported by the body of the opposition condemned in the most indignant language the atrocious proceedings brought to light".

Byng wrote to the Mercury, denying much of the initial report, but Baines printed the letter the following week accompanied by further evidence supporting the Mercury's account and rebutting Byng's. The report triggered revulsion locally against Oliver and against conviction of those led to crime by government agents. Earl Fitzwilliam, a Whig magnate and Lord Lieutenant of the West Riding, wrote to the Home Office saying that any disturbances in the Riding had been minor and were brought about by Oliver's activities (of which he complained) : the government should not use them to justify a renewed suspension of Habeas Corpus. Fitzwilliam advised the Huddersfield magistrates not to gather evidence against their rioters; that could only come from accomplices and hence be highly objectionable. At York assizes, the judge in his direction to the jury was even harsher than Fitzwilliam on the unreliability of the evidence of accomplices, and no convictions were secured. Whilst the Mercury's exposure of Oliver prevented the conviction of the Yorkshire prisoners, in Derbyshire the participants in the 'Pentridge rebellion' (also triggered by Oliver) were not so fortunate, having by mischance killed a man before dispersing when faced with the magistrates and twenty dragoons. Thirty-five were tried for high treason and twenty-three convicted; four being executed. Baines could therefore claim to have saved the lives of fellow-Yorkshiremen., and the unmasking of 'Oliver' gave Baines a national reputation.

However, critics such as William Cobbett pointed out that it was the suspicions of a linen-draper, rather than any investigation by the editor of the Mercury, that had unmasked Oliver, and objected to Baines's treatment of Joseph Mitchell. Oliver had made a previous tour of the North and Midlands with Mitchell, who knew and introduced him to potential insurrectionists. Mitchell was arrested in early May and Oliver made his second tour alone. After Oliver's exposure, Baines prevented Mitchell speaking at meetings of Yorkshire fellow reformers, alleging that Mitchell was under the gravest suspicion of being a spy too. No evidence (other than 'guilt by association') to support Mitchell being an informer - let alone an agent provocateur - was produced at the time, nor has any been revealed by subsequent investigation in Home Office archives.

=== "The Great Liar of the North" ===
Baines used the Mercury to advance the causes he supported, and to resist those he opposed, not only in its editorials, but also in its news reporting. This went beyond the selective choice of events to report, and non-neutral reporting of events covered, to the confident assertion of convenient untruths: for example on factory reform the Mercury asserted that Michael Thomas Sadler had never spoken, attended a debate or voted on Hobhouse's Bill of 1831, (a statement promptly contradicted by Hobhouse); it put into the mouth of Sir George Strickland a speech in Parliament calling for Sadler's Bill of 1832 to go to a select committee, when Strickland had made no such speech and had called for the bill to be considered by a "Committee of the whole House" and not be delayed by a select committee; when Strickland attended a great county meeting in York on factory reform and disowned the words put in his mouth by the Mercury the Mercury's report put into Strickland's mouth its explanation of its mistake, avoiding any mention of the Leeds Mercury. The report of the county meeting alleged widespread drunkenness amongst the attendees, a point which had somehow gone unnoticed by other newspapers. (Note: The Mercury report is not consistently slanted; most is in good agreement with other newspaper reports, including praise of the perseverance of attendees who marched from the West Riding to York in atrocious conditions. On a subsequent occasion, a Mercury reporter was reported (by the other Leeds papers but not by the Mercury) to have defended himself against a motion to expel him from a Radical meeting by claiming that his practice was to always submit a fair report; any unfairness was added at the Mercury offices.) Offended by the claims of drunkenness, factory reform supporters subsequently burnt Baines in effigy outside the Mercury offices; the effigy was labelled front and back "The Great Liar of the North", an epithet Cobbett had previously hurled at the Mercury and Baines, to whom it had stuck. Cobbett later wrote more memorably, and more quotably, of

"BROUGHAM's grand puffer, "the GREAT LIAR OF THE NORTH," NED BAINES, publisher of that mass of lies and nonsense called the "Leeds Mercury" … this swelled-up, greedy, and unprincipled puffer, who has been the deluder of Yorkshire for twenty years past."

== Authorship ==
As well as his journalistic output, Baines was the author of a number of histories and gazetteers. His first book - a History of the Wars of the French Revolution - was published in 1817, having first been published as a part-work from 1814 onwards. Its account up to 1801 borrowed extensively (and sometimes verbatim) from another author's earlier work of 1803 on the same topic (A Stephens The History of the Wars Which Arose out of the French Revolution to Which is Prefixed a Review of the Causes of that Event (London 1803)). This went unacknowledged until Baines revised, expanded and retitled the work as a History of the Reign of King George III (1820); his new preface stating "To facilitate ... progress, and at the recommendation of the publisher and proprietor of Mr Alexander Stephens' s History of the Wars published in 1803, nearly half the details of the first volume were abridged from that work." This later led to denunciation of Baines as a plagiarist by one of the editors of the Intelligencer. He also produced history/directory/gazetteers for Yorkshire and for Lancashire, later reworking the latter as a county history, The History of the County Palatine of Lancaster which was continued by other authors.

== Political career ==
=== Leeds ===
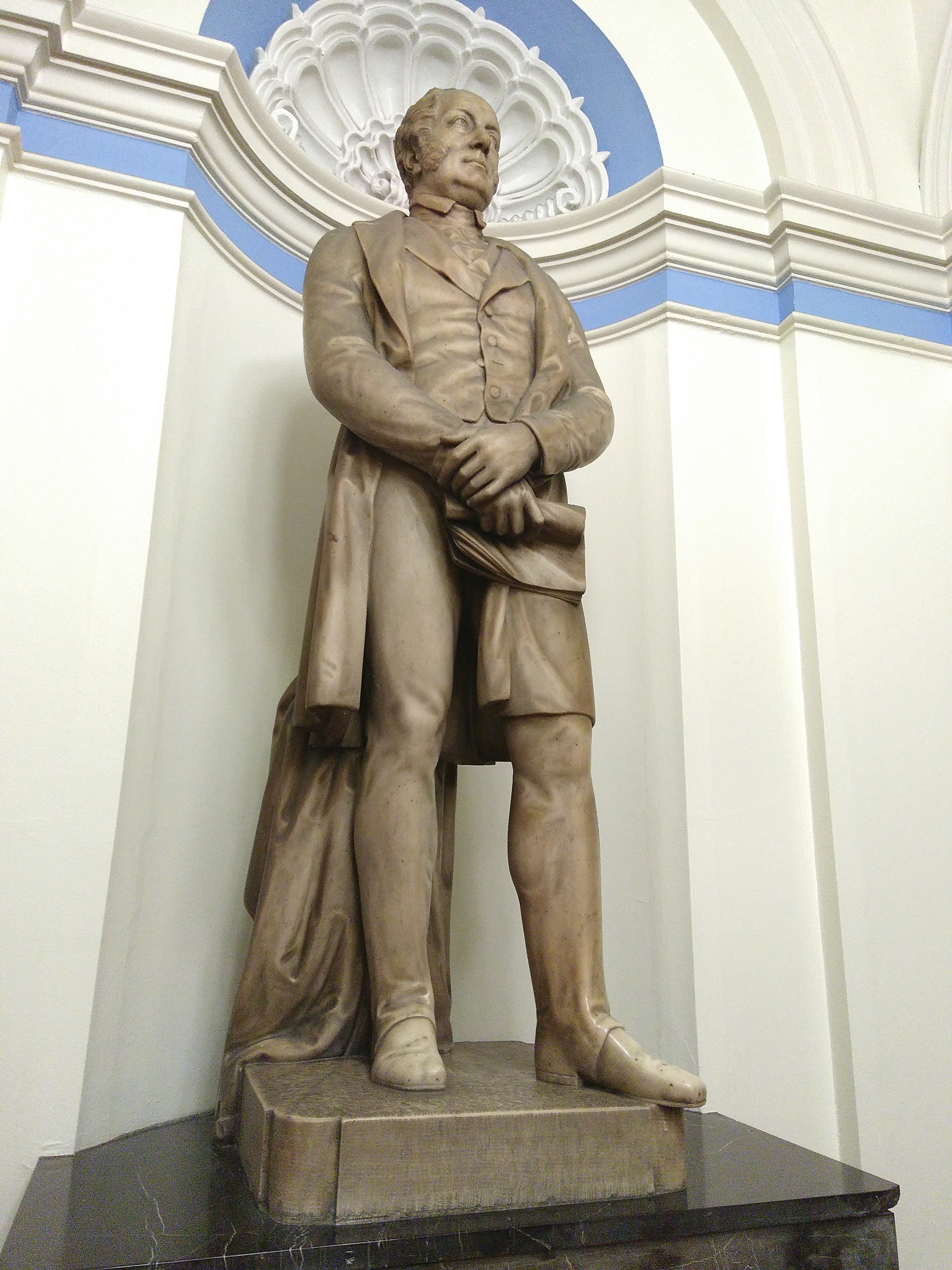
Statue of Edward Baines in Leeds City Hall

As proprietor and editor of the Mercury Baines became an important figure in the affairs of Leeds. An obituary in 1848 noted

Mr Baines took a part in the formation and support of many, if not most of the public institutions of Leeds. In early youth he was a visitor of the Benevolent, or Strangers' Friend Society, to which he always continued a warm friend. He assisted to establish the House of Recovery, the Dispensary, the Lancasterian School, the Philosophical Society, the Mechanics' Institution, the Literary Society, the New Library, the Tradesman's Benevolent Society, the Leeds and Yorkshire Insurance Company, our Provident institutions, our Waterworks…- in short, nearly all the institutions for public utility and benevolence established in Leeds within the last half century.

He also became an important figure in Leeds politics, although as a Dissenter and a Reformer he was effectively excluded from Leeds Corporation which until the 1830s was a 'closed corporation'; vacancies were filled by election by the existing members of the corporation; they were Tories and generally Anglicans, and hence so were their successors. One area of political life from which Reformers and Dissenters could not be excluded was the vestry meeting of the (Anglican) parish church - all property owners (including Dissenters and other non-conformists) had to pay church rates and rate-payers were entitled to attend and vote. Baines fought a prolonged campaign to impose strict economy on church outgoings, starting in 1819 with a demand that accounts be published, and finally in 1828 managing to secure the election of churchwardens committed to economy. (Note: By 1833, church out goings had been reduced from £1500 a year to £500. Although Baines had some Anglican allies, the 1832 Leeds election showed a strong denominational tinge to Leeds politics: helped by the fact that the Tory candidate (Michael Thomas Sadler (a vocal opponent of Baines at vestry meetings) although now an Anglican was well-known to have been a Methodist in his earlier years.)

In the decade before the Great Reform Act 1832 Leeds was not a parliamentary borough but was included in the Yorkshire constituency, now returning four MPs (normally two Whigs and two Tories, normally unopposed). In the 1830 General Election, Baines organised West Riding reformers to ensure that their interests were reflected by the choice of Lord Brougham and Viscount Morpeth as Whig nominees, a selection seen as a defeat of county Whigs by "Bainesocracy" of Leeds. On the Whigs coming to power, Brougham became Lord Chancellor, necessitating a by-election: this time the Whigs of rural Yorkshire forestalled the West Riding and secured a more traditional candidate: Sir John Vanden-Bempde-Johnstone of Harkness Hall, near Scarborough.

Baines was a leading light in reform agitation in Leeds, and was commissioned by Lord John Russell to determine whether qualification in borough constituencies could safely be set as low as £10 (rates paid a year). Baines found that in Leeds a £10 franchise would give the vote to the middle classes but still exclude the working classes: the results of Baines' investigation were reported by Russell in parliamentary debate as showing that "the £10 qualification does not admit any person who may not safely be intrusted with the elective franchise". (Note: ... Leeds has been regularly canvassed for the purposes of election, by twenty or thirty gentlemen, of respectable station and known character, in that chief seat of our woollen manufacture. The result of their canvass has been, that, in the quarters of the town chiefly inhabited by the working classes, not more than one in every fifty householders will have a vote under the 10l. clause. In the principal streets for shops, almost every male householder will have a vote. In the parts of the town occupied by dwelling houses, the number occupied by females makes a very material deduction from the number of votes. The working classes in Leeds, almost all live in houses of from 5l. to 8l. rent; out of 140 householders, heads of families (including several overlookers) employed in the mill of Messrs. Marshall and Co., not more than two will have votes; out of 160 householders in the mill of Messrs. C. Willans and Sons, Holbeck (including fifteen overlookers) many earning 25s. to 30s. a-week, not one will have a vote; out of 100 householders in the works of Messrs. Taylor and Wordsworth, machine makers, only one, even of this high class of mechanics, will have a vote; out of 11,000 inhabitants of the township of Holbeck, chiefly occupied by the working classes, but also containing mills, dye-houses, public-houses, and some respectable dwellings, there would be only 150 voters. The township of Wortley has nearly 6,000 individuals, and 130 voters. Armley, with 5,000 inhabitants, will have only 150 votes. Upon the whole, the unanimous opinion of the canvassers was, that the 10l. qualification does not admit any person who may not safely be intrusted with the elective franchise...) As the reform crisis of 1831–1832 developed, Radicals (who wanted a more thorough-going reform: significantly wider suffrage, annual parliaments and the secret ballot) broke away from the Leeds reform organisation (the Leeds Association, set up by Baines and his associates) and founded the Leeds Radical Reform Union, pressing for Whig reform bills to be more thorough-going with a minority holding that they should be opposed (as a half-measure intended to choke off thorough reform). Baines strove to minimise the Radical breakaway, and to retain Radical support for moderate reform, by his own actions, by encouraging formation of a rival Leeds Political Union, by editorials in the Mercury and by ensuring that Radical meetings and manifestations were reported upon unfavourably by the Mercury. The Leeds Patriot, a Radical paper, soon found itself under attack from Baines, responding that "veracity has no charms for Mr Baines, when he has an object to carry...he will stoop to the meanest prevarication and the most contemptible falsehoods".

In the expectation that the Reform Bill of 1831, would pass, and would establish Leeds as a two-member borough constituency, the Leeds reformers chose two candidates in August 1831: John Marshall (whose father, also John Marshall was a leading Leeds millowner and had served as an MP for Yorkshire), and (at Baines's urging) Thomas Babington Macaulay, a gifted Whig orator with a national reputation, but no previous connection with Leeds. When elections for the first reformed parliament eventually took place in December 1832, the two Whigs comfortably defeated the sole Tory candidate Michael Thomas Sadler despite active support for Sadler from the Leeds radical reformers. Sadler had taken up the issue of factory reform; the Mercury (which had printed Richard Oastler's first letter on "Yorkshire Slavery" (the over-working and ill-treatment of children in the West Riding textile industry) before cooling on the issue) denounced this as a Tory trick to lure the gullible away from the Whig reform programme. (Baines and the Mercury were to hold similar views on the anti-Poor Law movement of the late 1830s; the underlying cause of working-class discontent was the Corn Laws, and all efforts should go into removing the underlying cause, rather than palliating its symptoms). Years of activity by Sadler and his brother in Leeds meant that much was known for and against him, and the Mercury was assiduous in reminding its readers of the 'against'.

The Tories and their Radical allies had attacked Macaulay as a placeman and a stranger: interested in Leeds only as providing him with a seat in Parliament; interested in a seat in Parliament largely as a means of securing comfortable sinecures for himself and his family (whose government appointments were currently yielding them a total annual income of over £4000). The Macaulay family was seriously financially embarrassed, and Macaulay soon decided that income from posts held only for so long as the Whigs held power was insufficiently secure. He resigned from parliament and went out to India in 1834 as a member of the supreme council of India, on an annual salary of £10,000. Baines was the Whig candidate at the ensuing by-election; there was a separate Radical candidate, but Baines's chief opponent was the Tory Sir John Beckett. Beckett was Leeds-born and educated; the Beckett family bank was pre-eminent in Leeds ("The Rothschilds and Barings of Leeds") and was recognised to have acted in the interests of Leeds as a whole in past crises, but Sir John had pursued a legal career away from Leeds, culminating in his appointment in mid-1817 (soon after his marriage to a daughter of the Earl of Lonsdale) as Judge Advocate-General, and consequent entry into Parliament in 1818 in Cockermouth, one of his father-in-law's pocket boroughs. As the Mercury pointed out, he had been Under-Secretary of State at the Home Office from 1806 to 1817, the Mercury going on to claim that it was from him that Oliver had received his instructions (Note: Beckett was employed as a lawyer, not a politician, and was (he asserted) ignorant of the existence of Oliver until his exposure. There is (to this day) at least plausible deniability that the Home Office knew precisely what Oliver was up to. When the Whig opposition objected strongly in Parliament to Oliver having been sent on tour as an agent provocateur, Lord Liverpool said Oliver had been positively instructed not to going beyond information-gathering to the encouragement or incitement of insurrection. Informants present at other meetings attended by 'Oliver' took him at face value (as a genuine delegate from insurrectionists in London) and reported to local magistrates his presence and incitement of insurrection, but the magistrates to whom they reported had not been informed by the Home Office that Oliver was working for it.) These and other accusations against Beckett were widely placarded across Leeds. Beckett (unlike Sadler) directly addressed Baines's accusations at the earliest opportunity in a good-humoured speech. Baines was elected, but his majority over Beckett was only thirty-one. Better Tory organisation for the 1835 general election saw Beckett displace Marshall, but at this and the 1837 general election Baines topped the poll; he stood down in at the 1841 election because his health was deteriorating.

=== Parliament ===
In parliament he occasionally spoke against Whig policies, but generally voted for them. (Note: His views on national political issues should be distinguished from those of his son Edward Baines who succeeded him both as editor of the Mercury and (eventually) as MP for Leeds. Unfortunately, it is not always easy to do so: as Thornton notes historians have often failed to distinguish between the two Edwards (sometimes taking them to be a single person); furthermore the son's biography of his father did not always clearly distinguish between the views which the elder Baines held and those which his son felt he should have held.) He spoke (and voted) against the Poor Law Amendment Act 1834, introducing the New Poor Law, because he felt that there was no call for central government to interfere in areas where poor rates were low; however he became a supporter when the new Poor Law Commission did not in practice intervene. He spoke frequently on the grievances of Dissenters: in May 1834 he chaired a national meeting of Dissenter delegations which preceded discussion of specific grievances with a resolution describing "full and complete separation of church and state" as "the true basis on which equal rights and justice can be secured to all classes of his majesty's subjects "; later that year he told parliament that "If the principles of dissent were properly understood, the very circumstance of a man being a Dissenter was a declaration that he could not agree to the union between Church and State." However, the Mercury reported although the 1834 meeting had readily endorsed the principle behind its resolution, there had been considerable debate as to the policy of stating it; as a compromise "it was determined to state the principle, but not put it forward in any petition or memorial". In 1837 Baines seems to have been badly worsted in debate as a result: in a debate on the abolition of church rates he was challenged whether this was the ultimate "healing measure" as far as Dissenters were concerned: he responded by denying that Dissenters had any intention to interfere with the connection between Church and State. The next speaker, however, not only gave the House an account of the proceedings at a recent anti-church rate meeting in Leeds, he had come prepared with a copy of the resolutions of the 1834 meeting, which he read out to the House. (Note: Speech of Mr. Hardy, to which Hansard does not do full justice - a fuller version can be found in the parliamentary report of the Evening Standard, which comments on the intermittent audibility in the reporters' gallery of the speech.) Baines failed to retrieve the situation by a subsequent editorial in the Leeds Mercury which asserted that whilst the vast majority of Dissenters thought any connection between church and state wrong, the vast majority of them did not see the existence of an established church as a political question, let alone a grievance; but was not believed. He spoke against the continuance of the English Regium Donum, and repeatedly argued that Queen Anne's Bounty ( a fund for augmenting the income of poor Church of England ministers) should be put on a much sounder basis: its revenue of 'First Fruits and Tenths' - calculated from revenues in the reign of Henry VIII - would be greatly increased by being calculated from current revenues. He supported Poulett Thomson's Bill of 1836 for relaxation of the 1834 Factory Act; he also voted for subsequent government factory regulation bills, but when he spoke in debates on them made it clear that he thought there was no need for them.

=== Children and legacy ===
His son, Sir Edward Baines (1800–1890), of St Ann's Hill, Leeds, was editor and afterwards proprietor of the Leeds Mercury, M.P. for Leeds (1859–1874), and was knighted in 1880; his History of the Cotton Manufacture (1835) was long a standard authority, he also wrote a biography of his father The life of Edward Baines, late M.P. for the Borough of Leeds.

An elder son, Matthew Talbot Baines (1799–1860), went to the bar; he became recorder of Kingston upon Hull in (1837), M.P. for Kingston upon Hull in 1847, president of the Poor Law Board in 1849, was returned as M.P. for Leeds 1852, again became president of the Poor Law Board (until 1855), and entered the cabinet as Chancellor of the Duchy of Lancaster in 1856.

He had two further surviving sons: Thomas Baines (1806–1881) and Frederick Baines (1811–1893); his fourth and fifth sons died during childhood.

The youngest daughter of Edward Baines – Margaret (d. 1891) – married another political figure, Charles Reed, in 1844.

Another daughter, Charlotte, was the mother of South Australian politician and mayor of Adelaide, Theodore Bruce.

== Publications ==
- Baines, Edward, History of the Wars of the French Revolution; from the breaking out of the war in 1792, to the restoration of a general peace, in 1815; comprehending the civil history of Great Britain and France during that period, London: Longman, Hurst, Rees, Orme and Brown

(Volume 1), 1817 (Volume 2), 1818

These became volumes 2 and 3 in an expanded four volume work:
- Baines, Edward (1820), History of the reign of George III, King of the United Kingdom of Great Britain and Ireland, Longman, Hurst; Hurst and Robinson Baines, Edward (1820), Volume 1Volume 4, Printed by E. Baines for Longman, Hurst and Hurst and Robinson

(In 1820, an enterprising American published those parts of volume 2 of Baines' "History of the Wars." dealing with the War of 1812 as Baine's History of the Late War between the United States and Great Britain, 1820)

- Baines, Edward, History, directory & gazetteer of the county of York.., Leeds: Edward Baines at the Leeds Mercury office: Volume I - West Riding, 1822; Volume II - East and North Ridings, 1823
- Baines, Edward. History, directory and gazetteer of the county palatine of Lancaster. The directory department by W. Parson. [With] Illustrations. Liverpool: W. Wales & Company. Baines, Edward (1824). Volume I. Baines, Edward (1825). Volume II.: later reworked as

- Baines, Edward (1836). History of the County Palatine and Duchy of Lancaster. The biographical department by W. R. Whatton. London: Fisher, son & Company. Baines, Edward (1836). Volume I. Volume II. 1836. Baines, Edward (1836). Volume III. Baines, Edward (1836). Volume IV.

- Edward Baines; the biographical department by W. R. Whatton, with the additions of John Harland and Brooke Herford (1888–1893). The History of the County Palatine and Duchy of Lancaster (New, revised and enlarged ed.). Manchester: John Heywood5 vols. An expansion of the author's 'History, directory and gazetteer of the county palatine of Lancaster', 1824–1825.

== Notes ==
Parliament of the United Kingdom
Preceded by John Marshall; Thomas Babington Macaulay	Member of Parliament for Leeds; 1834 – 1841; With: John Marshall to 1835; Sir John Beckett 1835–1837; Sir William Molesworth 1837–1841	Succeeded by William Beckett; William Aldam
