= James Garth Marshall =

English Liberal Party politician

James Garth Marshall (20 February 1802 – 22 October 1873) was an English Liberal Party politician, the Member of Parliament for Leeds (1847–1852).

He was the third son of the wealthy industrialist John Marshall who introduced major innovations in flax spinning and built the celebrated Marshall's Mill and Temple Works in Leeds, West Yorkshire. His eldest brother William was MP for Beverley, Carlisle and East Cumberland and his next eldest brother, John, was an earlier MP for Leeds. The fourth brother, Henry Cowper, was Mayor of Leeds in 1842–1843. A sister, Julia Anne Elliott, was a hymnwriter.

Marshall bought the Monk Coniston estate, near Coniston, Cumbria, from the Knott family in 1835. He later created the celebrated landscape of Tarn Hows by constructing a dam to merge three existing small tarns into the present body of water, at the same time supplying water power to his sawmill in Yewdale. The estate was later bought by Beatrix Potter and eventually passed to the National Trust.

In 1860-61 he served as High Sheriff of Yorkshire.

== Works ==
- Marshall, James Garth (1854). Minorities and Majorities; Their Relative Rights. A Letter to Lord John Russell, M.P. on Parliamentary Reform (2 ed.). London: James Ridgway.

Parliament of the United Kingdom
Preceded by William Aldam; William Beckett	Member of Parliament for Leeds; 1847–1852; With: William Beckett	Succeeded by Matthew Talbot Baines; George Goodman
