= George Skirrow Beecroft =

British Politician And Ironmaster

Member of Parliament for Leeds
- In office 5 June 1857 – 17 November 1868 Serving with Edward Baines (1859–1868); Matthew Talbot Baines (1857–1859)
- Preceded by: Robert Hall; Matthew Talbot Baines
- Succeeded by: Edward Baines; Robert Meek Carter; William St James Wheelhouse

Personal details
- Born: 16 November 1809 Outwood House, Horsforth
- Died: 18 March 1869 (aged 59) Regent's Park, London
- Resting place: Kensal Green Cemetery
- Party: Conservative
- Spouse(s): Septima Garland Butler (m. 1835; died 1837) Mary Isabella Beaumont (m. 1842)
- Parent: George Beecroft

George Skirrow Beecroft (16 November 1809 – 18 March 1869) was a British Conservative Party politician and ironmaster.

== Family ==
Born in 1809, Beecroft was the son of George Beecroft and Mary Audus. He first married his cousin Septima Garland Butler, daughter of Thomas Butler and Anne Beecroft, in 1835. Together, they had two children. The first died in infancy, and the second, Septima, died in 1868. His wife, Septima, died in 1837.

In 1842, he married Mary Isabella Beaumont, the daughter of George Beaumont. Together, they had two children: George Audus Beaumont (1844–1873) and Mary Alice, who died in infancy.

== Early life ==
Beecroft was educated for a mercantile life at Horton House, in Bradford, until he was 17. He then moved into the iron trade, working with his father and uncle, Thomas Butler (senior), at Kirkstall Forge, eventually becoming partners.

In 1841, he entered into partnership with his cousins—John Octavius Butler, Thomas Butler (junior), and Ambrose Edward Butler - at Beecroft, Butler - and Co, before retiring in 1855.

== Political career ==
Beecroft began his career as a member of the Leeds Town Council in 1849, holding office there until 1856. Outside of this, he was also President of the Leeds Conservative Association, a surveyor of highways, a churchwarden, and an active member of the Leeds Chamber of Commerce.

He was elected a Liberal-Conservative, nominally a Conservative, MP for Leeds at a by-election in 1857 - with politics supporting the Church of England, encouraging popular education, and extending the franchise - and held the seat until he stood down at the 1868 general election, owing to ill health.

== Other activities ==
Beecroft was also a Justice of the Peace and Deputy Lieutenant of the West Riding of Yorkshire.

Parliament of the United Kingdom
Preceded by Robert Hall; Matthew Talbot Baines	Member of Parliament for Leeds; 1857–1868; With: Edward Baines (1859–1868); Matthew Talbot Baines (1857–1859)	Succeeded by Edward Baines; Robert Meek Carter; William St James Wheelhouse
