= Robert Hall (MP for Leeds) =

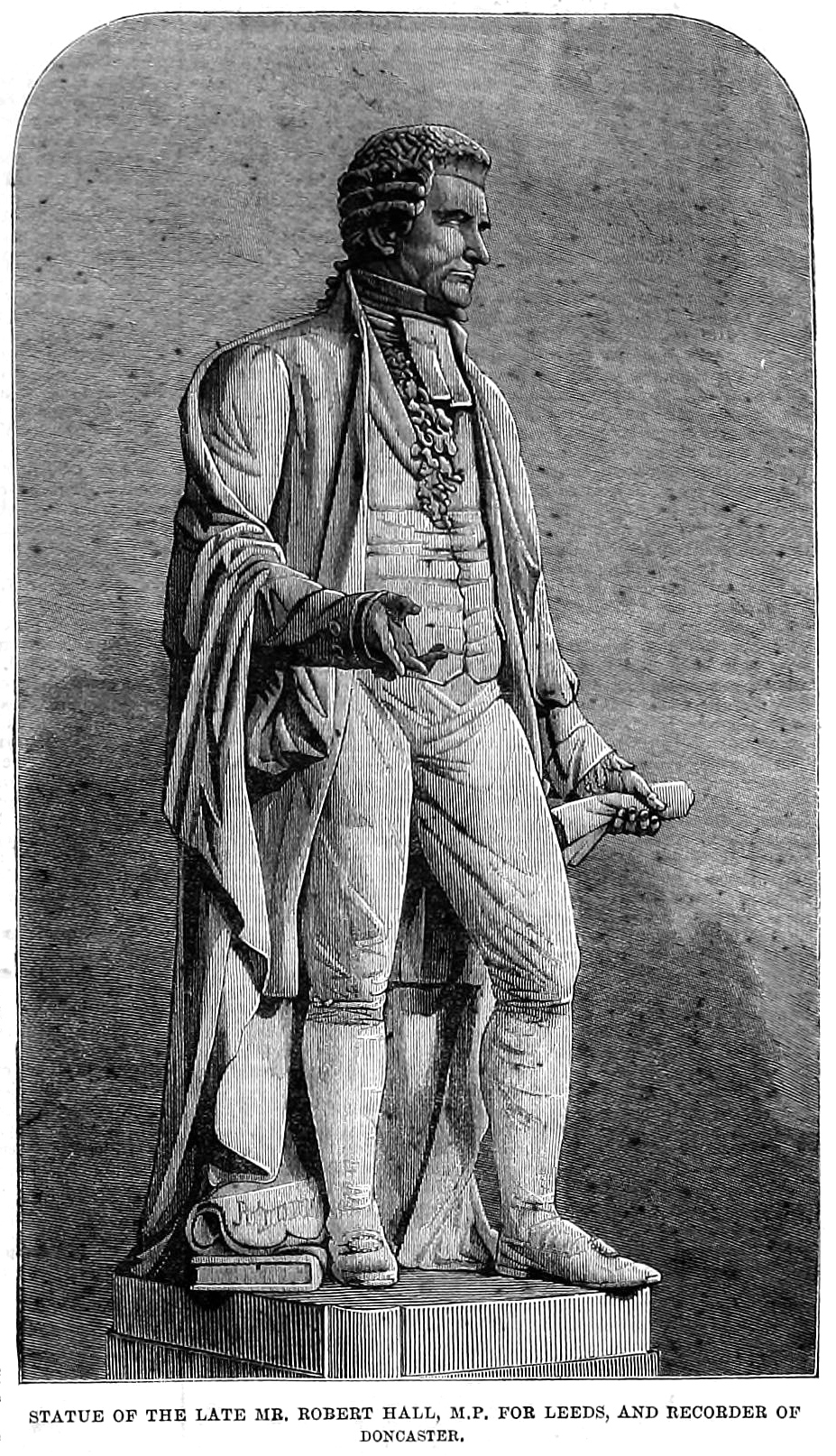
Statue of Robert Hall (1861)

Robert Hall (1801 – 25 May 1857) was an English lawyer and Conservative Party politician. He was elected at the general election in March 1857 as one of the two Members of Parliament (MPs) for Leeds, having unsuccessfully contested the seat in 1852. However he died in office less than two months after his election to the House of Commons.

He became Deputy Recorder of Leeds in 1842, and campaigned on child labour with Richard Oastler and Michael Thomas Sadler, and against juvenile crime, also founding a Sunday school. After his death he was commemorated by a statue.

Parliament of the United Kingdom
Preceded by Sir George Goodman; Matthew Talbot Baines	Member of Parliament for Leeds; March 1857 – May 1857; With: Matthew Talbot Baines	Succeeded by George Skirrow Beecroft; Matthew Talbot Baines
