= William Beckett (British politician) =

British politician (1784–1863)

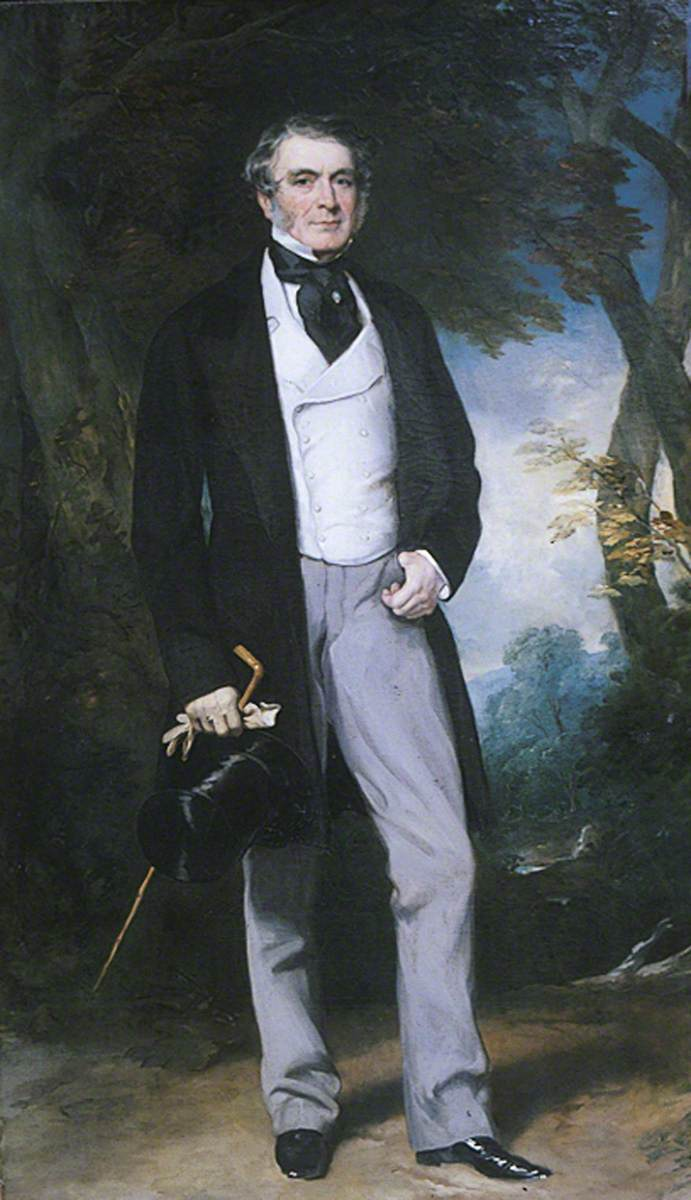
Portrait by Francis Grant, 1859

William Beckett (1784 – 26 January 1863) was an English Conservative politician

== Life ==
William Beckett was born in 1784 at Gledhow Hall, Leeds, one of eight sons and three daughters of Sir John Beckett (1743–1846) a banker who later became Mayor of Leeds and a baronet and his wife Mary Wilson. In 1841 Beckett married Frances Ingram and they had no children. He died 26 January 1863 at Brighton.

== Career ==
Beckett was an active partner in his father's bank, Old Bank in Leeds from 1840, it was known as Beckett's Bank from 1805. On their father's death, William and his brother Christopher (who also served as Mayor of Leeds) took over the family business. John Smith of Burley House, Burley, Leeds, became a partner in the business in 1841. Their running of the bank was noted as boldly liberal and prudent, saving many customers from embarrassment during the banking crisis of 1825, and Beckett was said to be a model banker. His banking reputation caused parliament to seek his comments on the renewal of the charter of the Bank of England in 1832.

Beckett was a Conservative Member of Parliament (MP) for the Yorkshire constituencies of Leeds (1841–1852) and Ripon (1852–1857). He changed seats because of a split in the party over Free Trade, causing him to withdraw as Leeds MP.

== Other Activities ==
Beckett's wealth and reputation gave him considerable status in Leeds, and in 1832 he bought an estate called New Grange in Headingley and renamed it Kirkstall Grange. The estate comprised large house on a hill and an extensive private park. He carried out extensive improvements and remodelling to the house and park, hoping at one point to have Queen Victoria as house guest when she visited Leeds in 1858. The park became Beckett Park, a public park, and the house a building within Leeds Beckett University.

Beckett was an officer in the Yorkshire Hussars, a part-time Yeomanry Cavalry regiment, from September 1817 when he raised two Troops at Leeds and was commissioned as a captain, until he retired in 1859. He was promoted to major on 27 October 1837 and to lieutenant-colonel on 8 October 1839. He commanded the regiment 1841–43 while the colonel, Thomas de Grey, 2nd Earl de Grey, was absent abroad.

Parliament of the United Kingdom
Preceded by Sir William Molesworth; Edward Baines	Member of Parliament for Leeds; 1841 – 1852; With: William Aldam to 1847; James Garth Marshall from 1847	Succeeded by Matthew Talbot Baines; Sir George Goodman
Preceded by Sir James Graham; Edwin Lascelles	Member of Parliament for Ripon; 1852 – 1857; With: Edwin Lascelles	Succeeded by John Ashley Warre; John Greenwood
