= Edward Baines (1800–1890) =

British politician and newspaper editor

Sir Edward Baines
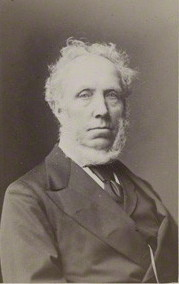
- Sir Edward Baines, c.1870
- Born: 28 May 1800; Leeds, England
- Died: 2 March 1890 (aged 89); Leeds, England
- Occupations: Journalist, politician
- Known for: Voluntarism
- Political party: Liberal
- Spouse: Martha Blackburn (m. 1829)
- Children: Thomas Blackburn Baines (1832–1891)
- Parent(s): Edward Baines; Charlotte Baines née Talbot
- Relatives: Son-in-law, Rev. Eustace Conder (1820–1892)

Sir Edward Baines (28 May 1800 – 2 March 1890), also known as Edward Baines Jr, was a nonconformist English newspaper editor and Member of Parliament (MP), and ancestor of author Jilly Cooper.

== Biography ==
Edward Baines, of St Ann's Hill, Leeds, was the second son (and biographer) of Edward Baines (1774–1848), proprietor of the Leeds Mercury and MP for Leeds in the 1830s, and his wife Charlotte Talbot. His elder brother, Matthew Talbot Baines, was also a politician.

Edward Baines junior was educated at a Leeds private school and then at a dissenting academy – the Leaf Square grammar school at Pendleton, near Manchester, alongside his lifelong friend John Peele Clapham. From 1815 he worked as a journalist on the Leeds Mercury (in which capacity he was an eye-witness of the Peterloo massacre), becoming a junior editor c 1820 and a partner in the business in 1827. He became sole editor when his father was elected to Parliament in 1834, and, after his father's death in 1848, proprietor of the Leeds Mercury. He served as Liberal MP for Leeds from 1859 to 1874. He was knighted in 1880.

A political Liberal, he supported the Reform Act 1832 (2 & 3 Will. 4. c. 45) and the Poor Law Amendment Act 1834; he was an advocate of repeal of the corn laws and of the separation of church and state. He was an opponent of the factory reform movement and responsible for the Mercury's rejection of Richard Oastler's letters to it on the subject. A staunch Dissenter, he opposed state-sponsored education (because it was unthinkable that education should be purely secular, but also unconscionable that the state should have any involvement with religious instruction).

In 1843 he wrote in the Mercury that education was something individuals could do for themselves "under the guidance of natural instinct and self-interest, infinitely better than Government could do for them". Hence "All Government interference to COMPEL Education is wrong" and had unacceptable implications: "If Government has a right to compel Education, it has right to compel RELIGION !" He withdrew his opposition in the 1860s, when he reluctantly conceded the inadequacy of efforts for the voluntary provision of education. In the 1860s he repeatedly introduced bills to widen the franchise; all were defeated.

Baines helped to found the Leeds Literary and Philosophical Society. He was also a prominent advocate of working-class adult education, founding Yorkshire Mechanics' Institutes in imitation of George Birkbeck's London mechanics' institute. Contributions of his on the cotton industry to his father's History of Lancashire were praised by reviewers; at their suggestion his History of the Cotton Manufacture was published separately with much additional material (1835). He celebrated the natural position and the political advantages of English commerce and manufacturing districts, and especially of the English navy which "held the sovereignty of the ocean, and under its protection the commerce of this country extended beyond all former bounds, and established a firm connexion between the manufacturers of Lancashire and their customers in the most distant lands."

Baines also wrote a number of more polemical works; e.g. criticisms of Owenism. In 1840 he attended the World's Anti-Slavery Convention where he was captured in a group painting.

He married Martha Blackburn in 1829.

Baines died on 2 March 1890 in Leeds, and was interred in the family vault at Woodhouse Cemetery.

== Works ==
- Baines, Edward (1826). An Address to the Unemployed Workmen of Yorkshire and Lancashire, on the present distress, and on machinery. London: James Ridgway, etc.
- Baines, Edward (1834). A Companion to the Lakes of Cumberland, Westmoreland, and Lancashire: in a descriptive account of a family tour and excursions on horseback and on foot: with a new, copious, and correct itinerary (3rd ed.). Simpkin and Marshall.
- Baines, Edward (1835). History of the Cotton Manufacture. H. Fisher, R. Fisher, P. Jackson.
- Baines, Edward (1843). The Social, Educational and Religious State of the Manufacturing Districts (3rd ed.). Simpkin, Marshall & Co.; T. Ward & Co.
- Baines, Edward (1840). The Socialists, A Society of Beasts, Important and interesting Proposal addressed to Robert Owen Esq.
- Baines, Edward (1847). An Alarm to the Nation, on the unjust, unconstitutional and dangerous measure of state education proposed by the government.
- Baines, Edward (1851). The Life of Edward Baines, late M.P. for the Borough of Leeds. Longman, Brown, Green and Longman (London); Reid Newsome (Leeds).

== See also ==
- Charles Reed, educationalist and MP, married Edward Baines's sister Margaret
- Edward Crossley, of Halifax, carpet-manufacturer, astronomer and MP, married Edward Baines's third daughter, Jane Eleanor

Parliament of the United Kingdom
| Preceded by Matthew Talbot Baines; George Skirrow Beecroft | Member of Parliament for Leeds; 1859 – 1874; With: George Skirrow Beecroft to 1868; Robert Meek Carter from 1868; William Wheelhouse from 1868 | Succeeded by Robert Tennant; Robert Meek Carter; William Wheelhouse |
