= William Aldam =

English Liberal Party politician and MP

William Aldam (20 August 1813 – 27 July 1890) was an English Liberal Party politician and MP for the Yorkshire constituency of Leeds between 1841 and 1847.

Aldam studied law at the Middle Temple beginning in 1834 and was called to the bar in 1839 but never practised as a barrister. He became a justice of the peace in the West Riding of Yorkshire court of quarter sessions in 1842 and High Sheriff of Yorkshire in 1878.

Aldam was noted for promoting the development of railways and canals and for his staunch supporter of free trade. He was born a Quaker but converted to Anglicanism.

A ship named William Aldam was registered at Goole in 1854 and wrecked in 1856.

== Family ==
His father, also called William Aldam (died 1828), was a cloth merchant in Leeds. The family name was originally Pease, but his father changed it when he inherited the estate of the Aldam family at Frickley, near Doncaster).

On 13 November 1845 he married Mary Stables, daughter of Rev. Godfrey Wright, of Bilham; she died 4 October 1867.

His son and heir William Wright Aldam (1853–1925) married Sarah Julia Warde in 1878 and took the surname of Warde-Aldam; he was High Sheriff of Yorkshire in 1905. His nephew William Aldam Milner (via his sister Susan) was High Sheriff of Derbyshire in 1911.

Parliament of the United Kingdom
Preceded by Sir William Molesworth; Edward Baines	Member of Parliament for Leeds; 1841 – 1847; With: William Beckett to 1852	Succeeded by James Garth Marshall
