= Leeds Mercury =

Newspaper

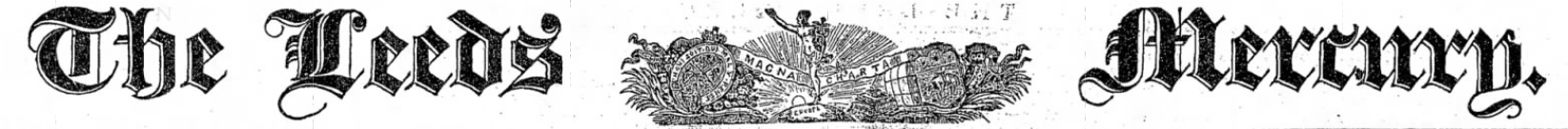
- Type: Weekly newspaper
- Founded: 1718
- Ceased publication: November 26, 1939

The Leeds Mercury was a newspaper published in Leeds, West Yorkshire, England. It was published from 1718 to 1755 and again from 1767. Initially it consisted of 12 pages and cost three halfpennies. In 1794 it had a circulation of about 3,000 copies, and in 1797 the cost rose to sixpence because of increased stamp duty. It appeared weekly until 1855, then three times a week until 1861 when stamp duty was abolished and it became a daily paper costing one penny.

Edward Baines (1774–1848) bought the paper in 1801, and his son Sir Edward Baines (1800–1890) succeeded him as editor and proprietor.

In 1923 the Leeds Mercury was acquired by the Yorkshire Conservative Newspaper Company Limited (now Yorkshire Post Newspapers), publishers of the Yorkshire Post, but it continued to be published as a separate title until 26 November 1939, after which a combined paper was published as the Yorkshire Post with the Mercury name kept as a subtitle for some years. The merger was not announced until after the last edition of the Mercury had been published, to prevent national newspapers from having the opportunity to attract Mercury readers to their titles instead of to the new merged paper.

The issues of the Leeds Mercury from 3 January 1807 to 1900 have been digitised as part of the British Library's 19th-century newspapers digitisation project, through which they are accessible free of charge to members of UK Higher Education and Further Education institutions, some public libraries, the British Library's buildings, and for a fee to other subscribers.

== In literature ==
Sherlock Holmes: "The detection of [printing] types is one of the most elementary branches of knowledge to the special expert in crime, though I confess that once when I was very young I confused the Leeds Mercury with the Western Morning News." (The Hound of the Baskervilles, Ch. 5).
