= George Lowther Thompson =

British politician (1786–1841)

George Lowther Thompson (1786 – 25 December 1841) was member of parliament for Haslemere (1826–1830) and Yarmouth (Isle of Wight) 1830–1831.

His family was associated with Sheriff Hutton Park.

Parliament of the United Kingdom
Preceded by Robert Ward; Charles Long	Member of Parliament for Haslemere; 1823–1830; With: Charles Long (1823–1826); Sir John Beckett (1826–1830)	Succeeded by Sir John Beckett; William Holmes
Preceded by Joseph Phillimore; Thomas Wallace	Member of Parliament for Yarmouth; 1830–1831; With: William Yates Peel	Succeeded by Sir Henry Willoughby; Charles Compton Cavendish
