= Adam Baynes =

Member of Parliament for Leeds
- In office 3 September 1654 – 22 January 1655

Member of Parliament for Leeds
- In office 17 September 1656 – 4 February 1658

Member of Parliament for Appleby
- In office 27 January 1659 – 22 April 1659

Personal details
- Born: 1622 Leeds, England
- Died: 1671 (aged 48–49)

Adam Baynes (bapt. 1622; died 1671) was a Parliamentarian army officer and MP for Leeds during the Commonwealth, and as such the first MP for the city. He was later also MP for Appleby. He enjoyed the patronage of John Lambert, who he served under during the First English Civil War, which helped his parliamentary career, but also later led to his downfall when the Royalists regained power in 1660.

== Life and career ==
Adam Baynes was the eldest son of Robert Baynes and Joan Brown, of Knostrop Hall, east of Leeds, where his family had resided since at least the middle of the sixteenth century. He was baptised on 22 December 1622 in Leeds.

During the First English Civil War, Baynes joined the Parliamentarian army, serving under Ferdinando, Lord Fairfax. After initially serving as a captain in the infantry, he raised a cavalry troop, and subsequently fought at the battles of Adwalton Moor and Marston Moor. He subsequently served as an officer under John Lambert, who had command of the northern brigade from August 1647. Baynes was moved to London, where he acted as the brigade's financial agent, purchasing lands, soldier's debts and estates for his fellow officers. He purchased the Holdenby House estate for himself in 1650, though he was criticised for the personal profits he made from the transactions.

He married Martha (née Dawson) in July 1650, and the pair had sixteen children, ten of whom outlived Baynes. The patronage of Lambert helped Baynes to gain election to the First Protectorate Parliament in 1654, and he was returned again two years later to the Second Protectorate Parliament. He was described as "an army agent of some influence at Whitehall", and was generally sympathetic towards Quakers. After Lambert was removed from his position by Oliver Cromwell, Baynes also left his position, though it is unclear if he was removed or resigned. In 1659, Leeds did not have a seat in Parliament, and Baynes was instead elected as an MP for Appleby. Baynes continued to support Lambert in the House of Commons, opposing the vote to make Richard Cromwell the second Lord Protector. The dissolution of The Protectorate in 1659 allowed Baynes to return to the Army, but a year later the Royalist favouring Convention Parliament had him arrested and had to forfeit the crown lands he had purchased. He kept most of his Holdenby estate and received an appointment as "crown receiver for the manor of Leeds".

He suffered financial issues in the mid-1660s, and was sent to the Tower of London in 1666 for "treasonable practices". He died around 5 January 1671, and left "houses, coalpits, and a 'considerable colliery'" to his family.
