= John Marshall (MP for Leeds) =

English politician

John Marshall (28 December 1797 – 31 October 1836) was an English politician, the Member of Parliament for Leeds (1832–1835). He was the second son of the wealthy industrialist John Marshall who introduced major innovations in flax spinning and built the celebrated Marshall's Mill and Temple Works in Leeds, West Yorkshire. His eldest brother William was MP for Beverley, Carlisle and East Cumberland and his next younger brother James Garth was a later MP for Leeds. The fourth brother, Henry Cowper, was Mayor of Leeds in 1842–1843. A sister, Julia Anne Elliott, was a hymnwriter.

Marshall married Mary Dykes, daughter of Joseph Ballantyne Dykes from Cockermouth, Cumbria, and they had five children. Their youngest son Julian was a noted music and print collector and writer.

Parliament of the United Kingdom
New constituency	Member of Parliament for Leeds; 1832 – 1835; With: Thomas Babington Macaulay 1832–1834; Edward Baines 1834–1835	Succeeded by Edward Baines; Sir John Beckett
