= Douglastown =

Coordinates: 56.613928°N 2.951488°W

- Location within Angus
- OS grid reference: NO417473
- Council area: Angus
- Lieutenancy area: Angus
- Country: Scotland
- Sovereign state: United Kingdom
- Post town: FORFAR
- Postcode district: DD8
- Dialling code: 01307
- Police: Scotland
- Fire: Scottish
- Ambulance: Scottish
- UK Parliament: Angus
- Scottish Parliament: North Tayside

Douglastown (Scots pronunciation: [ˈdʌgɫəstən]) is a hamlet in Kinnettles in Angus, Scotland, three miles south-west of Forfar. It takes its name from the landowner who in about 1789 provided land for James Ivory & Co. (in which Mr Douglas was a partner) to build a flax mill to spin yarn for heavy linen cloth called osnaburgs (named from the German town of Osnabrück, where it was originally made. The hamlet of Douglastown was built to house the workers. The mill closed in 1834. It used flax-spinning technology invented by John Kendrew and Thomas Porthouse of Darlington, patented in 1787.

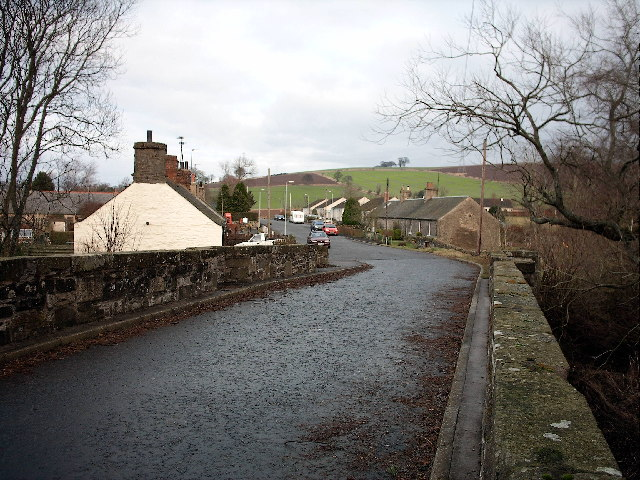
Douglastown
