= Sir John Beckett, 2nd Baronet =

British lawyer and Tory politician

- Born: 17 May 1775
- Died: 31 May 1847
- Occupation: Politician
- Spouse: Lady Anne Lowther
- Parents: Sir John Beckett, 1st Bt. (father); Mary Wilson (mother)

Sir John Beckett, 2nd Baronet, FRS (17 May 1775 – 31 May 1847) was a British lawyer and Tory politician.

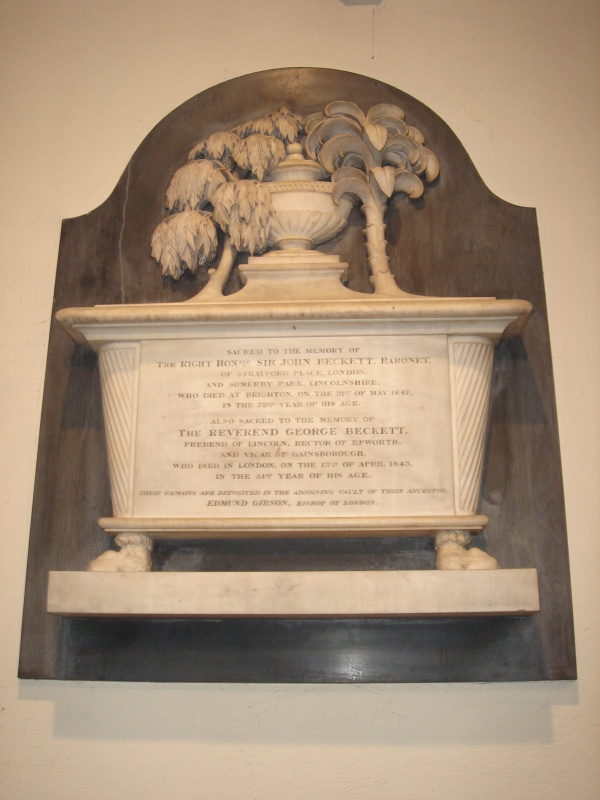
Funerary monument, All Saints, Fulham, London

Beckett was the son of Sir John Beckett, 1st Baronet (1743–1826), and his wife Mary, daughter of Christopher Wilson (bishop), Bishop of Bristol. He was also a descendant of Edmund Gibson, Bishop of London.

He was elected to Parliament for Cockermouth in 1818, a seat he held until 1821, and then sat for Haslemere from 1826 to 1832 and for Leeds from 1835 to 1837.

Beckett was admitted to the Privy Council in 1817 and appointed Judge Advocate General by Prime Minister Lord Liverpool in the same year. He held this office until 1827, and again under the Duke of Wellington from 1828 to 1830 and under Sir Robert Peel from 1834 to 1835.

Beckett married Lady Anne Lowther, daughter of William Lowther, 1st Earl of Lonsdale, in 1817.

He died in Brighton on 31 May 1847, aged 72, and is buried at All Saints Church, Fulham, London.

He was succeeded in the baronetcy by his younger brother, Thomas Beckett. Beckett's nephew (and the 5th baronet) was the architect Edmund Beckett, 1st Baron Grimthorpe.

Parliament of the United Kingdom
Preceded by Thomas Wallace; John Henry Lowther	Member of Parliament for Cockermouth; 1818 – 1821; With: John Henry Lowther	Succeeded by William Wilson Carus Wilson; John Henry Lowther
Preceded by Charles Long; George Lowther Thompson	Member of Parliament for Haslemere; 1826 – 1830; With: George Lowther Thompson 1826–1830; William Holmes 1830–1832	Constituency abolished
Preceded by John Marshall; Edward Baines	Member of Parliament for Leeds; 1835 – 1837; With: Edward Baines	Succeeded by Sir William Molesworth, Bt; Edward Baines
Legal offices
Preceded by Robert Cutlar Fergusson	Judge Advocate General; 1834–1835	Succeeded by Robert Cutlar Fergusson
Baronetage of the United Kingdom
Preceded by John Beckett	Baronet (of Leeds); 1826–1847	Succeeded by Thomas Beckett
