= Matthew Talbot Baines =

British lawyer and politician

The Right Honourable Matthew Talbot Baines QC DL
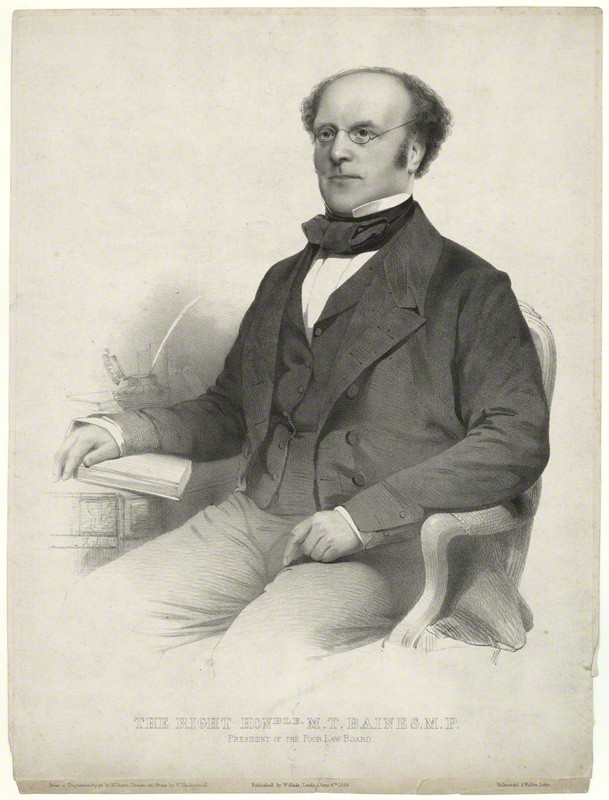

President of the Poor Law Board
- In office 1 January 1849 – 21 February 1852
- Monarch: Victoria
- Prime Minister: Lord John Russell
- Preceded by: Charles Buller
- Succeeded by: Sir John Trollope, Bt
- In office 30 December 1852 – 13 August 1855
- Monarch: Victoria
- Prime Minister: The Earl of Aberdeen
- Preceded by: Sir John Trollope, Bt
- Succeeded by: Hon. Edward Pleydell-Bouverie

Chancellor of the Duchy of Lancaster
- In office 7 December 1855 – 21 February 1858
- Monarch: Victoria
- Prime Minister: The Viscount Palmerston
- Preceded by: The Earl of Harrowby
- Succeeded by: The Duke of Montrose

Personal details
- Born: 17 February 1799 Leeds, Yorkshire
- Died: 22 January 1860 (aged 60)
- Party: Whig, Liberal
- Education: Trinity College, Cambridge

Matthew Talbot Baines PC QC DL (17 February 1799 – 22 January 1860) was a British lawyer and Liberal politician. He most notably served as Chancellor of the Duchy of Lancaster in Lord Palmerston's 1855 to 1858 administration.

== Background and education ==
Born at Leeds, Yorkshire, Baines was the eldest son of Edward Baines, a noted journalist and minor politician, by Charlotte, daughter of Matthew Talbot. Sir Edward Baines was his younger brother. He was educated at Richmond School and Trinity College, Cambridge, where he graduated in 1820.

== Legal and political career ==
Baines was called to the bar in 1825 and established a successful legal practice. In 1837 Baines was appointed Recorder of Kingston upon Hull, and in 1841 he became a Queen's Counsel. Baines then turned to politics and was elected to parliament for Kingston upon Hull in 1847, a seat he held until 1852, and subsequently represented Leeds until 1859. Only two years after entering the House of Commons, he was appointed President of the Poor Law Board in the Whig administration of Lord John Russell. In July 1849 he was also admitted to the Privy Council. The Liberals fell from power in February 1852, but in December of the same year he was once again appointed President of the Poor Law Board, this time in the coalition government headed by Lord Aberdeen.

Baines remained as head of the Poor Law Board when Lord Palmerston's became Prime Minister in February 1855. In December 1855 he was made Chancellor of the Duchy of Lancaster with a seat in the cabinet. He remained in this office until the Liberals lost power in 1858. Baines was also a Deputy Lieutenant of the West Riding of Yorkshire and of Lancashire. He retired from public life in April 1859 on grounds of ill-health.

== Personal life ==
In 1833, Baines married the only daughter of Lazarus Threlfall. He died in January 1860, at the age of 60.

Parliament of the United Kingdom
Preceded by Sir John Hanmer, Bt; Sir Walter James, Bt	Member of Parliament for Kingston upon Hull; 1847 – 1852; With: James Clay	Succeeded by Viscount Goderich; James Clay
Preceded by James Garth Marshall; William Beckett	Member of Parliament for Leeds; 1852 – 1859; With: Sir George Goodman 1852–1857; Robert Hall March–June 1857; George Skirrow Beecroft 1857–1859	Succeeded by Edward Baines; George Skirrow Beecroft
Political offices
Preceded by Charles Buller	President of the Poor Law Board; 1849 – 1852	Succeeded by Sir John Trollope, Bt
Preceded by Sir John Trollope, Bt	President of the Poor Law Board; 1852 – 1855	Succeeded by Hon. Edward Pleydell-Bouverie
Preceded by The Earl of Harrowby	Chancellor of the Duchy of Lancaster; 1855 – 1858	Succeeded by The Duke of Montrose
