= Baron Allerton =

Title in the peerage of the United Kingdom

Baron Allerton, of Chapel Allerton in the West Riding of the County of Yorkshire, was a title in the Peerage of the United Kingdom. It was created on 17 July 1902 for the businessman and Conservative politician William Jackson. The title became extinct on the death of his grandson, the third Baron, on 1 July 1991.

== Barons Allerton (1902) ==
- William Lawies Jackson, 1st Baron Allerton (1840–1917)
- George Herbert Jackson, 2nd Baron Allerton (1867–1925)
- George William Lawies Jackson, 3rd Baron Allerton (1903–1991)
  - Edward Lawies Jackson (1928–1982)

Coat of arms of Baron Allerton
Crest A horse Or holding in the mouth an ear of wheat slipped Vert and resting the foreleg on three annulets as in the arms. Escutcheon Per chevron Gules and Or in chief two suns in splendour of the last and in base three annulets one and two interlaced of the first. Supporters On either side a horse Sable collared Vair and charged on the shoulder with three annulets interlaced two and one Or. Motto Essayez
