= George Goodman (politician) =

English wool-stapler, magistrate and Liberal politician

The Right Honourable Sir George Goodman
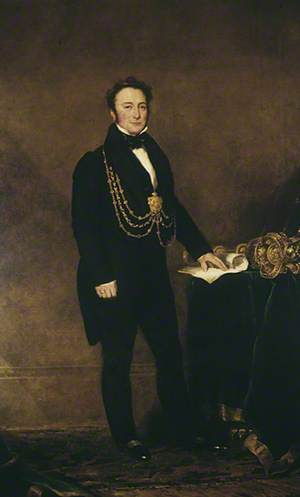
- Sir George Goodman, Mayor of Leeds

Member of Parliament
- In office 1852–1857
- Monarch: Victoria

Personal details
- Born: 17 November 1791 Leeds, Yorkshire, England
- Died: 13 October 1859 (aged 67) Roundhay, Yorkshire, England
- Party: Whig

Sir George Goodman (17 November 1791 – 13 October 1859) was an English wool-stapler, a magistrate for the borough and county of Leeds, as well as a Liberal politician. On 1 January 1836, he was elected the first Mayor of Leeds after the Municipal Corporations Act 1835, and he served as a member of parliament (MP) for Leeds from 1852 to 1857.

== Early years ==
Goodman was born in Leeds, the son of Benjamin Goodman (b. 1763 - d.10 June 1848), a wool merchant, and his wife, Ann Radford. He was baptised at Leeds South Parade Baptist Church and remained a Baptist. He had at least one sibling, a sister Eleanor (1791–1877).

== Career ==
"I have made it a rule through life either to fulfill my engagement, or to die at my post." (G. Goodman)

Goodman started his career learning his father's business and becoming a partner in his father's firm of B. Goodman & Sons at 21 Hunslet Lane, Leeds. He prospered as a wool-stapler in Leeds and Bradford, and was a Director of the Leeds and Bradford Railway. His firm acquired other local firms including, in 1846, Thomas Pearson and Sons, manufacturers of worsted.

He was elected Mayor of Leeds on 1 January 1836, the first Mayor of the City of Leeds after the Municipal Corporations Act. In April, he was presented a gold chain with an inscribed pendant to honour his mayoral election. Following the resignation of C. G. Maclea, Goodman was again elected mayor on 1 January 1847 and left office on 9 November 1847. He was re-elected for a third term on 9 November 1850, and a fourth term on 9 November 1851. He resigned from his position as mayor in March 1852 in order to be eligible to run for Parliament.

A Whig, Goodman was elected to Parliament with Matthew Talbot Baines in 1852. He was a magistrate of the West Riding of Yorkshire, and appointed a deputy lieutenant on 27 January 1853. In 1851, Goodman served as Leeds' civic representative at The Great Exhibition, after which, on 26 February 1852, he was knighted at Buckingham Palace, shortly before his resignation as mayor. Goodman sat for the Borough of Leeds in the House of Commons for five years, beginning at the 1852 general election, before retiring upon the 1857 dissolution of Parliament because of poor health brought about by a stroke of paralysis and neuralgia.

== Personal life ==
Goodman was a member of the Leeds Philosophical and Literary Society. He once made a donation to the society of fourteen birds from Australia. Although Goodman was recorded as living at Newton Hall estate in Potternewton, near Leeds in 1846, he had sold the estate to Arthur Lupton by 1845. Goodman never married. The Gentleman's Magazine reported that he died on 13 October 1859 at his seat, Roundhay, near Leeds aged 67. In compliance with Goodman's request, an autopsy was conducted, revealing softened spinal marrow. Goodman, a Baptist, was interred at Whitkirk Church.

He inherited his father's Roundhay estate, Goodman House, which was renamed Beechwood by Arthur Lupton's brother, Francis Lupton, who had purchased the estate by 1860, following George's death. In 1816, a portrait of George's father, Benjamin Goodman, was painted by Charles Henry Schwanfelder, also from Leeds and "Animal Painter" to King George III and King George IV.

Parliament of the United Kingdom
Preceded by William Beckett; James Garth Marshall	Member of Parliament for Leeds; 1852 – 1857; With: Matthew Talbot Baines	Succeeded by Robert Hall; Matthew Talbot Baines
