= Robert Meek Carter =

British coal merchant and Liberal politician

Member of Leeds council
- In office 1850–1853

Member of Parliament for Leeds
- In office 1868–1876

Personal details
- Born: 1814
- Died: 1882 (aged 67–68)
- Party: Liberal
- Occupation: Coal merchant

Robert Meek Carter (1814–1882) was a British coal merchant and Liberal politician.

In 1850 he was elected to the Leeds council as a Chartist, and was reelected in 1853. In 1868 he was elected as a Member of Parliament for Leeds, a position he held until his resignation in 1876.

Parliament of the United Kingdom
Preceded by George Skirrow Beecroft; Edward Baines	Member of Parliament for Leeds; 1868–1876; With: William St James Wheelhouse 1868–1876; Edward Baines 1868–1874; Robert Tennant 1874–1876	Succeeded by William St James Wheelhouse; Robert Tennant; John Barran
