= Sir John Barran, 1st Baronet =

British politician

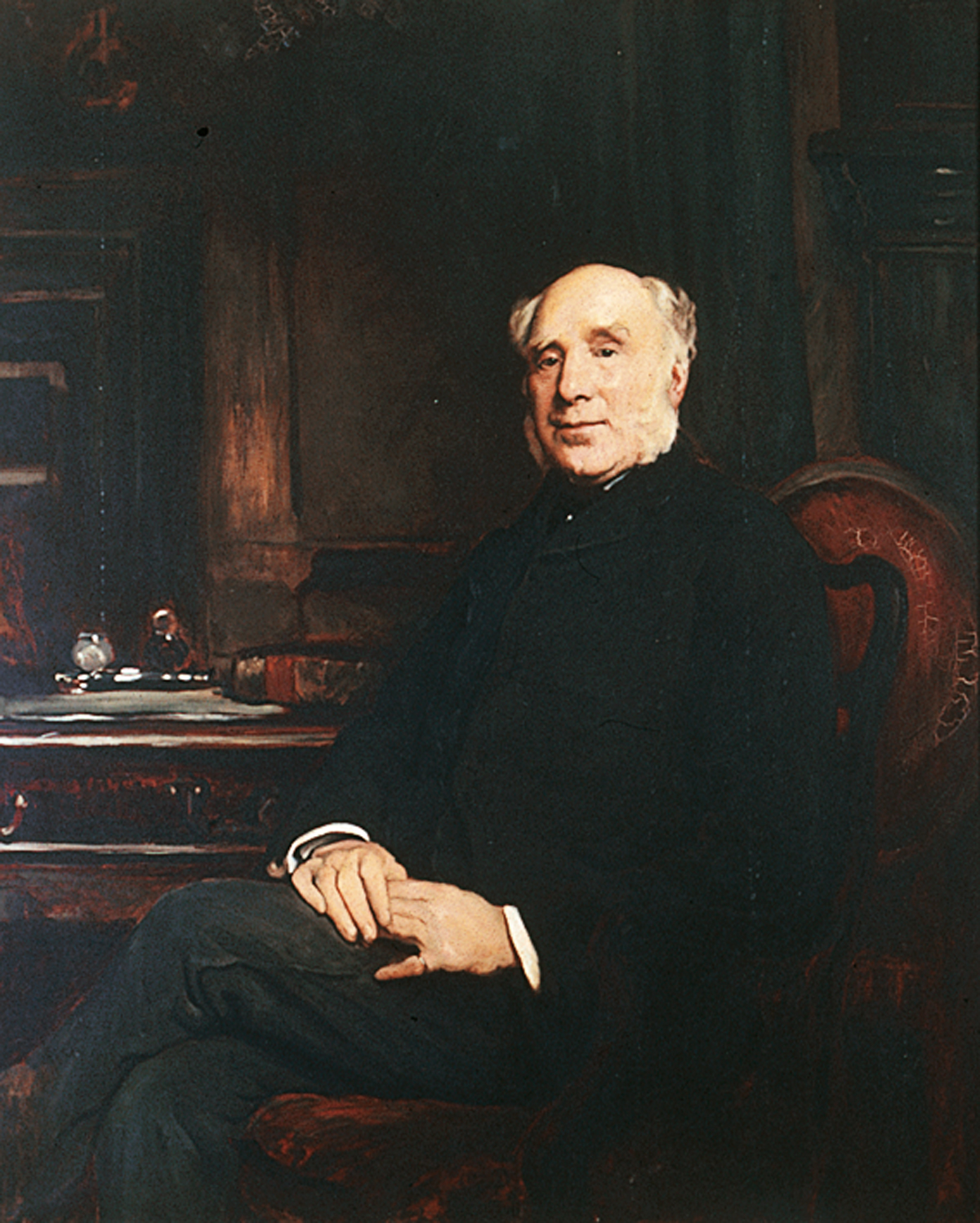
Sir John Barran

Sir John Barran, 1st Baronet (3 August 1821 – 3 May 1905) was a British clothing manufacturer and Liberal Party politician.

== Early life ==
Barran was born in London in 1821, the eldest surviving son of a gunsmith, John Barran, and his wife, Elizabeth (née Fletcher). When he was 21 he sailed to Hull, then travelled by rail to Leeds where he got a job with a pawnbroker and clothes dealer before setting up his own shop at no.1 Briggate, living over the shop with his wife and family.

== Public life ==
Barran founded the firm of John Barran and Sons, clothing manufacturers, of Leeds. He was a Justice of the Peace for Leeds and the West Riding of Yorkshire and served as Mayor of Leeds from 1870 to 1871. In 1876, he was returned to Parliament as one of three representatives for Leeds, a seat he held until 1885, and later sat for Otley from 1886 to 1895, when he was created a baronet, of Chapel Allerton Hall in Chapel Allerton in the West Riding of the County of York and Queen's Gate, St Mary Abbots parish, in Kensington in the County of London.

In 1872 he led a successful campaign to purchase the land of Roundhay Park for the people of Leeds.

== Family life ==
Barran married Ann Hirst (died 1874) in 1842. He married secondly, to Eliza Bilton, née Brown, in 1878. He had six sons and four daughters. One of his sons died young. His youngest son, Rowland, became a Member of Parliament.

Later Barran moved his factory to Park Row and in 1869 bought land to the south of the recently widened Boar Lane. Architect Thomas Ambler designed several buildings for him including a shop at ‘Number One’ Boar Lane. At this time he moved with his family to Chapel Allerton Hall.

Barran died in May 1905, aged 83, and was succeeded in the baronetcy by his grandson John, his eldest son John Barran having predeceased him. Barran was buried in Beckett Street Cemetery in Leeds.

== Clothing manufacture ==
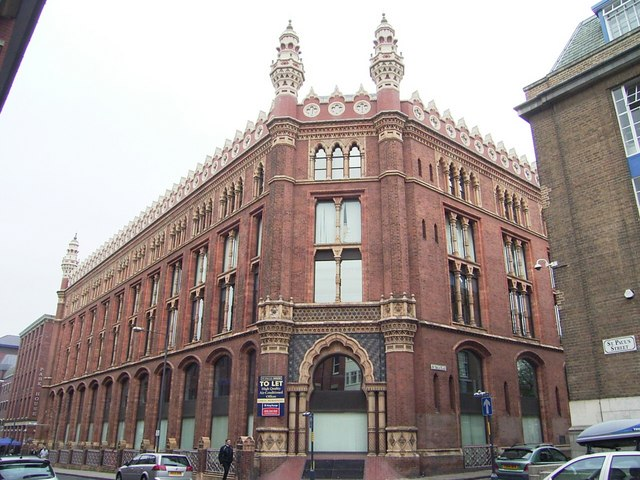
St Pauls House, Leeds, built as a warehouse for Barran in 1878

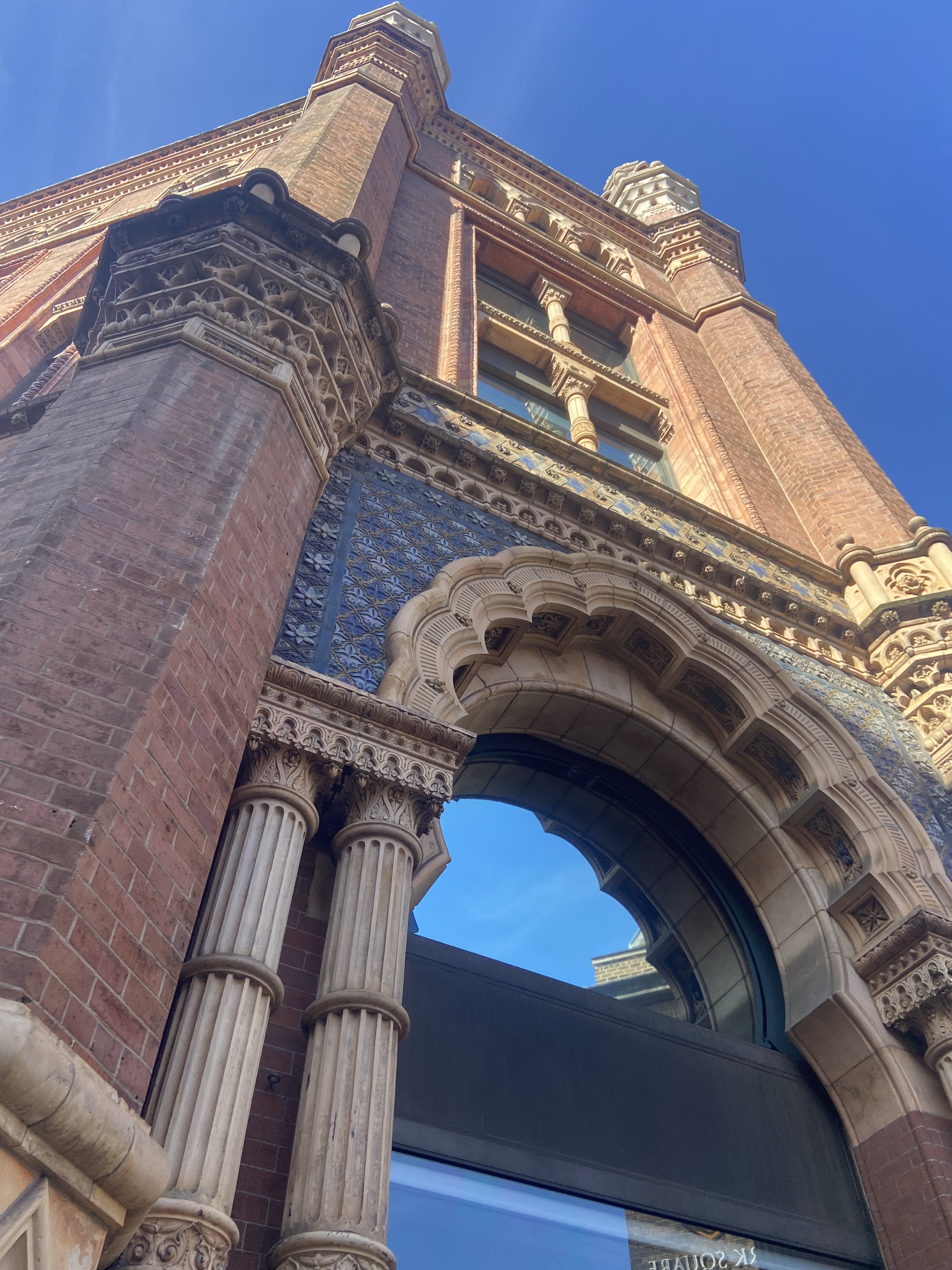
Detail of St Paul's House. Ornate window on Moorish Alhambra style.

John Barran was a pioneer in the manufacture of ready-to-wear clothing. He moved to Leeds in 1842, and soon opened his own tailoring shop at 30 Bridge End South. By 1851, he had moved to Briggate and, in 1856, he had a factory with 20-30 sewing machines. After seeing a bandsaw being used to cut wood veneers in 1858 he introduced its use for cutting cloth, a major innovation.

In 1877 he bought 8 houses at Park Square and employed Thomas Ambler again to design a new factory and warehouse in a Spanish Moorish style that is still there.

In addition to the adult market, John Barran & Sons produced children’s clothing, mainly boys suits and school uniforms but also some girlswear and fancy dress, with its juvenile wear contributing to a successful export market to Canada, Australia, South Africa, South America and Europe.

By the 1870s he had 2,000 machines, and in 1904 he employed 3,000 people, and between 1873 and 1900 the firm registered more than 380 designs for boys'clothing, more than any other company.

His son Charles took over as chairman of the company in 1903, and another son Rowland became chairman in 1918.

St Pauls House, Leeds in Park Square, Leeds was built as a warehouse for Barran in 1878. It was designed by Thomas Ambler, and is in Moorish style.

== Artistic recognition ==
His bust was sculpted by Joseph Gott, son of his rival Benjamin Gott. It is in Leeds Art Gallery.

== Notes ==
Parliament of the United Kingdom
Preceded by Robert Meek Carter; William St James Wheelhouse; Robert Tennant	Member of Parliament for Leeds; 1876 – 1885; With: William St James Wheelhouse 1876–1880; Robert Tennant 1876–1880; William Ewart Gladstone 1880; William Jackson 1880–1885; Herbert Gladstone 1880–1885	Constituency abolished
Preceded by Sir Andrew Fairbairn	Member of Parliament for Otley; 1886 – 1895	Succeeded by Marmaduke D'Arcy Wyvill
Baronetage of the United Kingdom
New creation	Baronet (of Chapel Allerton Hall and Queen's Gate); 1895 – 1905	Succeeded by John Barran
