= Robert Tennant =

English politician (1828–1900)

Arms of Tennant of Chapel House: Ermine, two bars each per pale gules and sable charged with three bezants two and one

Robert Tennant (1828 – 5 March 1900) of Chapel House in the parish of Conistone (now Conistone with Kilnsey, Burnsall), Yorkshire, England, was the Conservative Party Member of Parliament for Leeds, Yorkshire, from 1874 to 1880. He served as a captain in the Yorkshire Hussars and as a Justice of the Peace for Yorkshire and for Ross and Cromarty and Sutherland in Scotland.

== Origins ==
John Tennant (1722–1790) of Chapel House, a barrister of the Middle Temple, eldest brother of Robert Tennant (born 1725). Miniature by Arthur Devis

He was born in 1828, the youngest son of John Tennant Tennant (born 1790 as "John Tennant Stansfield") and Jane Tennant (born 1718). Robert's mother was a daughter of John Tennant (born 1686) of Chapel House, Yorkshire, whilst his father was a son of Jonathan Stansfield of Idle, Yorks, by his wife Miss Barcroft, a daughter of John Barcroft of Foulridge, Lancashire, Serving as a justice of the peace as well as a Captain in the 3rd West Yorkshire Militia, John Tennant Stansfield inherited the Chapel House estate from his childless great-uncle Robert Tennant (born 1725), and adopted the surname and arms of Tennant in compliance with the bequest. Chapel House, on the site of an ancient chapel belonging to Kilnsey Grange, a possession of Fountains Abbey, was purchased by the Tennant family in 1572. The Tennant Arms public house in Kilnsey commemorates the family. His mother (his father's second wife) was Anne Catherine Shaw, a daughter of James Shaw of Otley.

== Inheritance ==
In 1894 he inherited Chapel House from his childless elder half-brother John Robert Tennant (1817–1894), JP, DL, Capt. 3rd West Yorkshire Militia, also of Kildwick Hall, whose diaries 1847–73 survive in the Yorkshire Archaeological and Historical Society.

== Career ==
He was educated at the Leeds Grammar School for the legal profession, but chose a career in business, and became a junior partner in a firm of flax spinners in Leeds. For many years he was closely identified with the commercial and industrial life of West Riding of Yorkshire, and he owned extensive estates. He was chairman of several coal and iron companies, and Director of the Great Northern Railway.

In politics, he was elected as a Member of Parliament for Leeds in the 1874 general election, but served only one term as the constituency adopted the former (and future) Prime Minister William Ewart Gladstone as their candidate in 1880. Tennant was unsuccessful when he tried to contest Peterborough that year.

== Marriage and children ==
1936 mural monument to Tennant family of Chapel House; St Mary's Church, Conistone

In 1850 he married Harriete Garnett (d.1899), a daughter of the newspaper proprietor Jeremiah Garnett (1793–1870), of Mount Broughton, Manchester, by whom he had 7 sons and 4 daughters, to all of whom a mural monument (post 1936) survives in St Mary's Church, Conistone, as follows:

- John Robert Tennant (1851–1918), eldest son and heir, Capt. 2nd West Yorkshire Militia, who in 1900 sold Chapel House. He married Eleanor Anne Rolleston (d.1917), a daughter of Col. Lancelot Rolleston, of Watnall Hall, Notts, MP for South Nottinghamshire.
- Geoffrey Garnett Tennant (1853–1889), 2nd son, JP, Capt. 2nd West Yorkshire Militia, died unmarried.
- Cecil Arthur Tennant (1857–1916), 3rd son, a barrister of Lincoln's Inn.
- Robert Hugh Tennant (1861–1936), 4th son, of Arncliffe Cote and of Darley Abbey, Derby, heir to his eldest brother, Chairman of Westminster Bank (1927–31), Member of the Advisory Council to the Board of Trade (1924–26), President British Bankers' Association (1924–25), unmarried.
- Frederick William Tennant (1862–1934), 5th son, of Spofforth Grange, Yorks, who married Agnes Fraser Nickols, 2nd daughter of Harold Nickols of Sandford House, Kirkstall, Leeds, proprietor of the Joppa Tannery in Kirkstall, whose sister Frances Claire Nickols was the wife of Joseph Watson, 1st Baron Manton.
- Gilbert Edward Tennant (1863–1921), 6th son
- Philip Charles Tennant (1867–1936), 7th son, of Hatfield Priory, lord of the manor of Hatfield Peverel in Essex. In 1894 he married Alice Heydemann, a daughter of Nicholas Hermann Heydemann (1817–1889) of Bradford, Yorks and of Grove Hill, Twyford, Berkshire, a cloth merchant, Consul of the Imperial German Consulate in Bradford and a naturalised British subject since 1864.
- Marian "Isabel" Catherine Tennant (1854–1928), married Charles Henry Cumberland of Walton Place, Surrey.
- Laura Francis Harriette Tennant (1855–1933);
- Hilda Margaret Tennant (1859–1928), who married Arthur Janion Edwards, JP, Barrister of Lincoln's Inn, of Beech Hill Park, Waltham Abbey, Essex, and was the mother of the polo player Captain Arthur Noel Edwards (1883–1915) and of the cricketer Guy Janion Edwards (1881–1962);
- Eleanora Hope Shaw Tennant (1865–1956) of Spofforth Grange, Harrogate, Yorks.

== Death and burial ==
He died at Roffey in Sussex in his 72nd year, on 5 March 1900. His white marble inscribed memorial tablet survives in St Mary's Church, Conistone.

Parliament of the United Kingdom
Preceded by Robert Meek Carter; Edward Baines (junior)	Member of Parliament for Leeds; 1874–1880; With: Robert Meek Carter 1874–1876; John Barran 1876–1880	Succeeded by William Ewart Gladstone; John Barran
