= John Kendrew (inventor) =

British inventor

John Kendrew (1748-1800), a Darlington Quaker, is best known for having invented the first effective process for the mechanical spinning of flax. With Thomas Porthouse, a local clockmaker, he built a working machine and together in 1787 they patented the design in both England and Scotland. They licensed the technology to others, and subsequently each built their own mill — Kendrew's being near Haughton le Skerne on the NE outskirts of Darlington. After Kendrew's death, Porthouse took out his own patent, as did others and most flax mills were technological descendants of the Kendrew/Porthouse design.

By 1776, Kendrew, a self-taught mechanic, had erected a water driven mill on the river Skerne, at Low Mill, just south of Darlington Bridge, for the purpose of grinding spectacle lenses in large numbers. After that date he was frequently described as an 'optician'. This mill continued in operating after his death, and achieved contemporary fame, though claims that it was the first of its kind in the country cannot be upheld.
