= Leeds (UK Parliament constituency) =

Parliamentary constituency in the United Kingdom, 1868–1885

- Former borough constituency for the House of Commons
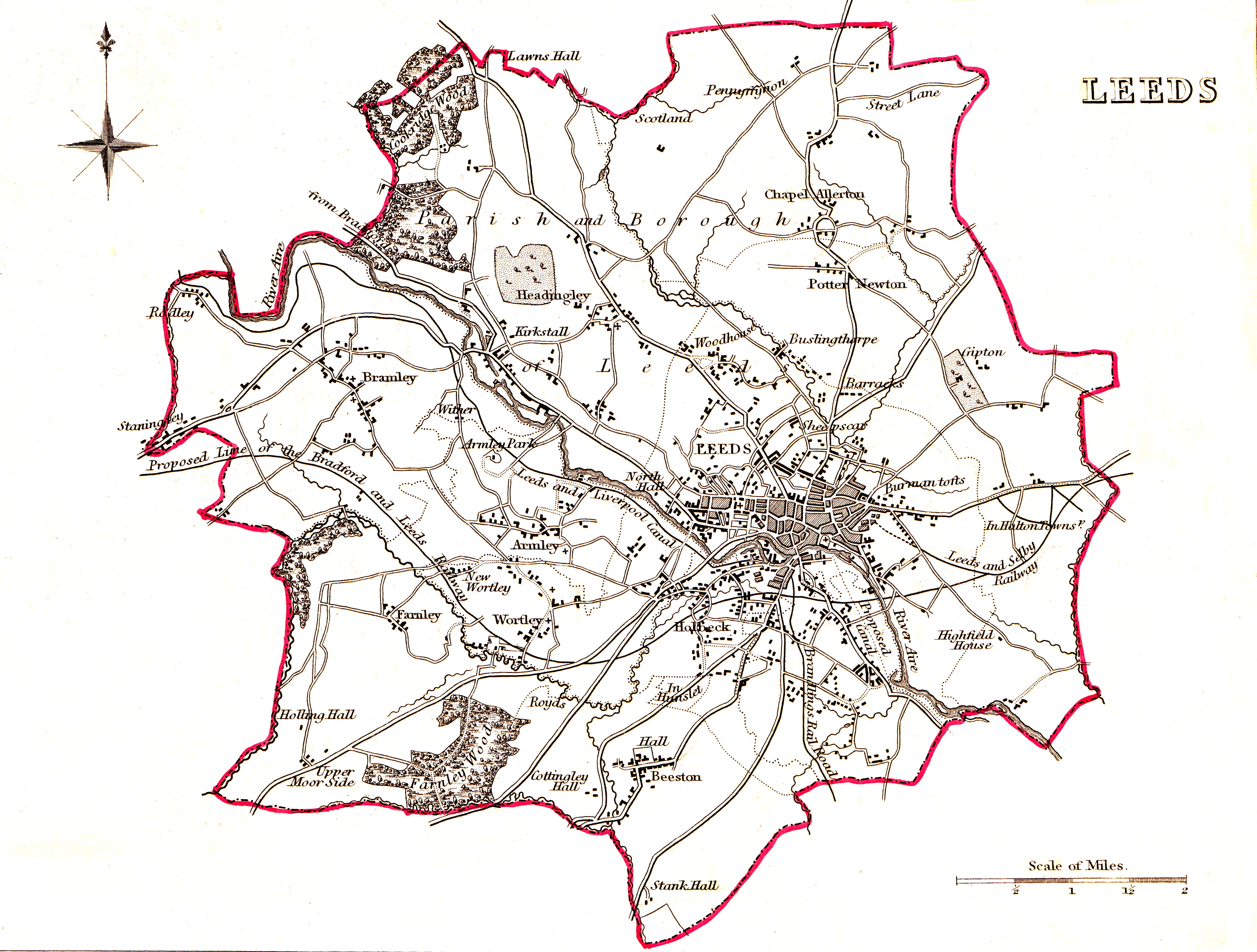
- County: West Riding of Yorkshire
- Major settlements: Leeds

1832–1885
- Seats: 1832–1868: Two; 1865–1885: Three
- Created from: Yorkshire
- Replaced by: Leeds Central; Leeds East; Leeds North; Leeds South; Leeds West

Leeds was a parliamentary borough covering the town of Leeds, in the West Riding of Yorkshire, England. It was represented in the House of Commons of the Parliament of the United Kingdom from 1832 to 1885.

The borough returned two Members of Parliament (MPs) until 1868, and then three MPs from 1868 until the Redistribution of Seats Act 1885 split the borough into five divisions at the 1885 general election.

== Boundaries and history ==
=== Representation before 1832 ===
Until the 1832 United Kingdom general election the major town of Leeds was represented in Parliament solely as a part of the county constituency of Yorkshire. The only exceptions had been that the town was represented as a single member borough in the First and Second Protectorate Parliaments from 1654 to 1658.

Before 1832 no new English parliamentary borough had been enfranchised since the 1670s, but Leeds came close to being represented from 1826. Stooks Smith, in The Parliaments of England, explained what happened.

Immediately after the Parliament elected in 1818 had assembled in 1819, a petition was presented to the House of Commons, complaining in the usual terms, that gross bribery and corruption had been practised in the return of the two Members for the Borough of Grampound, in Cornwall. In the course of the Session the matter was minutely investigated and the alleged guilt incontrovertibly proved. The course of procedure in such cases was to pass an act disfranchising the place convicted, and transferring the right so abused and forfeited, to some other body of Electors. It devolved upon Lord John Russell, who had conducted the proceedings in the House of Commons ... to originate a Bill for the above purpose. On the meeting of the New Parliament, April 28th, Lord J. Russell gave notice that he should bring in his proposed bill for disfranchising Grampound and transferring the privilege to Leeds. The Bill was ... framed to extend the right of voting to all Householders rated at or over £5 per annum, which it was estimated would constitute a body of, at least 8,000 Electors for the Borough. When the ... measure came under discussion ... Mr Beaumont ... suggested that the County of York should be divided into two Counties, one consisting of the West Riding and the other of the North and East Ridings combined; and, that instead of giving two representatives to Leeds, they should be granted to either of these divisions – Mr Wynn ... objected ... but was the first to recommend that the two new Members be transferred to the County of York, in addition to the two it already returned. ... The Legislature ... assembled in January 1821 ... Mr Beaumont renewed his objection ... upon which a division took place. The numbers were, for the amendment 66, against it 126, leaving a majority of 60 in favour of the measure peoposed by Lord John Russell. The Bill, as introduced this session, so far deviated from that of the previous year as to confer the Elective franchise upon the Mayor and Corporation of Leeds, and all Householders within the Borough, assessed at not less than Ten Pounds instead of Five Pounds per annum to the poor and parish rates. This provision, it was found on examination, would still have thrown the right of returning members, chiefly into the hands of the inferior classes, and necessarily have fostered those impure and unprincipled practices, notoriously prevalent in places similarly privileged. Mr J.A.S. Wortley to remedy this defect, moved ... that the qualification should be limited to Householders rated at not less than Twenty Pounds per annum ... in its amended form the Bill passed the House of Commons.

The House of Lords amended the bill, as Mr Wynn had originally proposed, so Leeds had to wait until 1832 for enfranchisement.

Yorkshire was the largest of the historic counties of England. Between 1826 and 1832 the undivided county returned four Members of Parliament to the House of Commons, instead of the traditional two knights of the shire which the county had sent before then and all other English counties elected up until 1832.

=== County representation from 1832 ===
The Reform Act 1832 divided Yorkshire into three county constituencies, which each returned two members. The divisions were based on the three ridings, which were traditional sub-divisions of Yorkshire. Leeds was part of the West Riding of Yorkshire and thus fell within that Riding constituency.

Charles Seymour, in Electoral Reform in England and Wales, commented about the debate in 1832 about the non resident freeholder vote. This was a particularly important issue for the West Riding because the major towns of Bradford, Leeds and Sheffield and the important ones of Halifax, Huddersfield and Wakefield were all to become new parliamentary boroughs in 1832.

Though the general principle of the freeholder franchise was accepted without debate, one aspect of the question gave rise to much discussion at the time ... . The bill provided that the freeholders in boroughs who did not occupy their property should vote in the counties in which the borough was situated. This clause drew forth a torrent of complaint, especially from the Conservatives. Peel pointed out that it would be far simpler for the freeholders in the represented boroughs to vote in the borough where their property was situate instead of being forced to travel to the county polling place; moreover if the borough freeholders were allowed to vote in the counties he felt that the boroughs would have an unfair influence in county elections and the rural element would be submerged by the urban.

... Althorp ... pointed out that until 1832 freeholders in the unrepresented towns always had voted in the counties, so the Tories could hardly complain that the ministers were introducing new principles to favour urban interests ... .

Stooks Smith records the number of electors in the Leeds polling district of the West Riding of Yorkshire constituency, at a by-election in 1835, as 2,250 (out of a total electorate of 18,063). Although it is not known if all these Leeds area voters were qualified as non-resident freeholders in the borough, the numbers given for this and other polling districts named after parliamentary boroughs suggest that up to two-thirds of the county voters in the West Riding might have qualified on that basis.

=== Borough representation from 1832 ===
The remainder of this article deals with the borough representation only, which is its focus.

In addition to the county constituency changes, the Representation of the People Act 1832 enfranchised the town as a new two member Parliamentary borough. The Parliamentary Boundaries Act 1832 defined that borough as comprising the parish of Leeds.

Lord John Russell, who was the member of the Whig government most involved in taking the reform legislation through Parliament in 1832, still favoured a more extensive franchise than Tory Party spokesmen – just as had been the case more than a decade earlier. However, Russell now had a House of Commons more favourable to his point of view.

A uniform borough franchise was introduced, on top of the various ancient right franchises found in the old parliamentary boroughs: (see the Unreformed House of Commons for a list of the different franchises in each borough). The new boroughs, like Leeds, had no ancient right borough voters so only the new franchise rules applied to them. Seymour explains that:-

Only one class of new rights was created by the act of 1832. This was the £10 occupation qualification. According to the act, the franchise was granted to all male persons who for a year before registration had occupied as owner or tenants "any house, warehouse, country house, shop or other building, either separately or jointly with any land" of a clear yearly value of £10. The land must be within the electoral limits of the borough; and in order to qualify, the occupier must have been rated in respect of such premises, to all rates for the relief of the poor; and he must have paid at the time of registration all rates and taxes due from him the preceding April.

This occupation franchise was the characteristic of the borough franchise after 1832. As ownership furnished the ordinary qualification for franchise in the counties, so in the boroughs, occupation, actual or constructive, was the basis of the suffrage. While however, in the counties no provision was made for ascertaining the true value or bona fide rent which was to qualify for the franchise; in the boroughs, assessment to the taxes was embodied with the condition of value, and actual payment was super-added. There was another difference between the character of the county and borough franchises, as determined by the Reform Act. In the latter no claimant could be registered as a voter if he had received parochial relief within the past twelve months; in the counties, no disqualification was attached to the receipt of poor-relief. ...

=== Third seat 1867 ===
Under the Representation of the People Act 1867 Leeds was given a third seat, but the individual electors could only cast a maximum of two votes. This limited vote provision was designed to promote minority representation in the larger constituencies, which were mostly major cities. These provisions took effect from the 1868 United Kingdom general election.

=== Abolition 1885 ===
Under the Redistribution of Seats Act 1885 single member constituencies became the norm. Leeds was divided into five such seats: Leeds Central, Leeds East, Leeds North, Leeds South and Leeds West. The new constituencies were first used for the 1885 United Kingdom general election.

== Members of Parliament ==
=== MPs 1654–1658 (Protectorate Parliaments) ===
Election	First member	First party
1654	Adam Baynes	
1656	Adam Baynes	

=== MPs 1832–1868 ===
Election	First member	First party	Second member	Second party
1832	John Marshall	Whig	Thomas Babington Macaulay	Whig
1834 by-election	John Marshall	Whig	Edward Baines	Whig
1835	Sir John Beckett	Conservative	Edward Baines	Whig
1837	Sir William Molesworth	Radical	Edward Baines	Whig
1841	William Beckett	Conservative	William Aldam	Whig
1847	William Beckett	Conservative	James Garth Marshall	Whig
1852	Matthew Talbot Baines	Whig	Sir George Goodman	Whig
March 1857	Matthew Talbot Baines	Whig	Robert Hall	Conservative
June 1857 by-election	Matthew Talbot Baines	Whig	George Skirrow Beecroft	Conservative
1859	Edward Baines (junior)	Liberal	George Skirrow Beecroft	Conservative
1868	Representation increased to three members			

=== MPs 1868–1885 ===
Election	First member	First party	Second member	Second party	Third member	Third party
1868	Edward Baines (junior)	Liberal	Robert Meek Carter	Liberal	William St James Wheelhouse	Conservative
1874	Robert Tennant	Conservative	Robert Meek Carter	Liberal	William St James Wheelhouse	Conservative
1876 by-election	Robert Tennant	Conservative	John Barran	Liberal	William St James Wheelhouse	Conservative
Apr 1880	William Ewart Gladstone	Liberal	John Barran	Liberal	William Jackson	Conservative
May 1880 by-election	Herbert Gladstone	Liberal	John Barran	Liberal	William Jackson	Conservative
1885	Constituency divided: see Leeds Central, Leeds East, Leeds North, Leeds South and Leeds West					

== Elections ==
=== Elections in the 1830s ===
General election 1832: Leeds
Party	Candidate	Votes	%
Whig	John Marshall	2,012	36.0
Whig	Thomas Babington Macaulay	1,984	35.5
Tory	Michael Thomas Sadler	1,596	28.5
Majority		388	7.0
Turnout		3,548	85.1
Registered electors		4,171	
Whig win (new seat)			
Whig win (new seat)			

Macaulay resigned after being appointed as a member of the Council of India, causing a by-election.

By-election, 17 February 1834: Leeds
Party	Candidate	Votes	%	±%
Whig	Edward Baines	1,951	50.1	−21.4
Tory	John Beckett	1,917	49.3	+20.8
Radical	Joshua Bower	24	0.6	N/A
Majority		34	0.8	−6.2
Turnout		3,892	76.9	−8.2
Registered electors		5,062		
Whig hold		Swing	−21.1	

General election 1835: Leeds
Party	Candidate	Votes	%	±%
Conservative	John Beckett	1,941	35.9	+7.4
Whig	Edward Baines	1,803	33.3	−2.7
Whig	William Brougham	1,665	30.8	−4.7
Conservative	John Plumbe Tempest	4	0.1	N/A
Turnout		3,633	76.1	−9.0
Registered electors		4,774		
Majority		276	5.1	N/A
Conservative gain from Whig		Swing	+7.4	
Majority		1,799	33.2	+26.2
Whig hold		Swing	−3.2	

General election 1837: Leeds
Party	Candidate	Votes	%	±%
Whig	Edward Baines	2,028	35.8	−28.3
Radical	William Molesworth	1,880	33.2	N/A
Conservative	John Beckett	1,759	31.0	−5.0
Turnout		3,719	66.7	−9.4
Registered electors		5,579		
Majority		148	2.6	−30.6
Whig hold		Swing	−11.7	
Majority		121	2.2	N/A
Radical gain from Conservative		Swing		

=== Elections in the 1840s ===
General election 1841: Leeds
Party	Candidate	Votes	%	±%
Conservative	William Beckett	2,076	25.7	+10.2
Whig	William Aldam	2,043	25.3	−10.5
Radical	Joseph Hume	2,033	25.2	−8.0
Conservative	Robert Jocelyn	1,926	23.8	+8.3
Turnout		4,092	64.8	−1.9
Registered electors		6,316		
Majority		43	0.5	N/A
Conservative gain from Radical		Swing	+7.1	
Majority		10	0.1	−2.5
Whig hold		Swing	−9.7	

General election 1847: Leeds
Party	Candidate	Votes	%	±%
Conservative	William Beckett	2,529	37.9	−11.6
Whig	James Garth Marshall	2,172	32.5	+7.2
Radical	Joseph Sturge	1,978	29.6	+4.4
Turnout		3,340 (est)	53.0 (est)	−11.8
Registered electors		6,300		
Majority		357	5.4	+4.9
Conservative hold		Swing	−6.9	
Majority		194	2.9	+2.8
Whig hold		Swing	+2.5	

=== Elections in the 1850s ===
General election 1852: Leeds
Party	Candidate	Votes	%	±%
Whig	George Goodman	2,344	34.1	+1.6
Whig	Matthew Talbot Baines	2,311	33.6	+4.0
Conservative	Robert Hall	1,132	16.5	−2.5
Conservative	Thomas Sidney	1,089	15.8	−3.2
Majority		1,179	17.1	N/A
Turnout		3,438 (est)	53.7 (est)	+0.7
Registered electors		6,406		
Whig hold		Swing	+2.2	
Whig gain from Conservative		Swing	+3.4	

Baines was appointed president of the Poor Law Board, requiring a by-election.

By-election, 3 January 1853: Leeds
Party	Candidate	Votes	%	±%
Whig	Matthew Talbot Baines	Unopposed		
Whig hold				

Baines was appointed Chancellor of the Duchy of Lancaster, requiring a by-election.

By-election, 6 February 1856: Leeds
Party	Candidate	Votes	%	±%
Whig	Matthew Talbot Baines	Unopposed		
Whig hold				

General election 1857: Leeds
Party	Candidate	Votes	%	±%
Whig	George Goodman	2,329	34.7	+0.6
Conservative	Robert Hall	2,237	33.3	+1.0
Radical	John Remington Mills	2,143	31.9	−1.7
Turnout		4,473 (est)	72.1 (est)	+18.4
Registered electors		6,204		
Majority		92	1.4	−15.7
Whig hold		Swing	+0.1	
Majority		94	1.4	N/A
Conservative gain from Whig		Swing	+0.4	

Hall's death caused a by-election.

By-election, 5 June 1857: Leeds
Party	Candidate	Votes	%	±%
Conservative	George Skirrow Beecroft	2,070	50.1	+16.8
Radical	John Remington Mills	2,064	49.9	+18.0
Majority		6	0.2	−1.2
Turnout		4,134	66.6	−5.5
Registered electors		6,204		
Conservative hold		Swing	−0.6	

General election 1859: Leeds
Party	Candidate	Votes	%	±%
Liberal	Edward Baines	2,343	33.8	−0.9
Conservative	George Skirrow Beecroft	2,302	33.2	−0.1
Liberal	William Edward Forster	2,280	32.9	+1.0
Turnout		4,614 (est)	77.6 (est)	+5.5
Registered electors		6,204		
Majority		41	0.6	−0.8
Liberal hold		Swing	−0.4	
Majority		22	0.3	−1.1
Conservative hold		Swing	−0.1	

=== Elections in the 1860s ===
General election 1865: Leeds
Party	Candidate	Votes	%	±%
Conservative	George Skirrow Beecroft	3,223	35.1	+1.9
Liberal	Edward Baines	3,045	33.2	−0.6
Liberal	John Russell	2,902	31.6	−1.3
Turnout		6,197 (est)	85.9 (est)	+8.3
Registered electors		7,217		
Majority		178	1.9	+1.6
Conservative hold		Swing	+1.1	
Liberal hold		Swing	−0.8	

Seat increased to three members

General election 1868: Leeds
Party	Candidate	Votes	%	±%
Liberal	Edward Baines	15,941	30.8	−2.4
Liberal	Robert Meek Carter	15,105	29.2	N/A
Conservative	William St James Wheelhouse	9,437	18.2	N/A
Liberal	Andrew Fairbairn	5,658	10.9	N/A
Conservative	Arthur Duncombe	5,621	10.9	N/A
Turnout		19,764 (est)	50.4 (est)	−35.5
Registered electors		39,244		
Majority		5,668	11.0	+9.4
Liberal hold		Swing		
Liberal win (new seat)				
Majority		3,779	7.3	+5.4
Conservative hold		Swing		

=== Elections in the 1870s ===
General election 1874: Leeds
Party	Candidate	Votes	%	±%
Liberal	Robert Meek Carter	15,390	25.1	−4.1
Conservative	William St James Wheelhouse	14,864	24.3	+6.1
Conservative	Robert Tennant	13,194	21.5	+10.6
Liberal	Edward Baines	11,850	19.3	−11.5
Liberal	Frederic Richard Lees	5,954	9.7	−1.2
Turnout		25,094 (est)	54.6 (est)	+4.2
Registered electors		45,991		
Majority		526	0.8	−10.2
Liberal hold		Swing	−3.6	
Majority		1,344	2.2	N/A
Conservative hold		Swing	+2.1	
Conservative gain from Liberal		Swing	+11.1	

Lees retired before polling day.

Carter resigned, causing a by-election.

By-election, 15 Aug 1876: Leeds
Party	Candidate	Votes	%	±%
Liberal	John Barran	16,672	54.8	+0.7
Conservative	William Jackson	13,774	45.2	−0.6
Majority		2,898	9.6	N/A
Turnout		30,446	63.0	+8.4
Registered electors		48,313		
Liberal gain from Conservative		Swing	+0.7	

=== Elections in the 1880s ===
General election 1880: Leeds
Party	Candidate	Votes	%	±%
Liberal	William Ewart Gladstone	24,622	33.5	+8.4
Liberal	John Barran	23,647	32.1	+3.1
Conservative	William Jackson	13,331	18.1	−3.4
Conservative	William St James Wheelhouse	11,965	16.3	−8.0
Turnout		36,783 (est)	75.1 (est)	+20.5
Registered electors		49,000		
Majority		11,682	15.8	N/A
Liberal hold		Swing		
Liberal gain from Conservative		Swing		
Conservative hold		Swing		

Gladstone was also elected MP for Midlothian and opted to sit there, causing a by-election.

By-election, 10 May 1880: Leeds
Party	Candidate	Votes	%	±%
Liberal	Herbert Gladstone	Unopposed		
Liberal hold				

Gladstone was appointed a Lord Commissioner of the Treasury, requiring a by-election.

By-election, 24 Aug 1881: Leeds
Party	Candidate	Votes	%	±%
Liberal	Herbert Gladstone	Unopposed		
Liberal hold				
