= List of museums in Staffordshire =

This list of museums in Staffordshire, England contains museums which are defined for this context as institutions (including nonprofit organizations, government entities, and private businesses) that collect and care for objects of cultural, artistic, scientific, or historical interest and make their collections or related exhibits available for public viewing. Also included are non-profit art galleries and university art galleries. Museums that exist only in cyberspace (i.e., virtual museums) are not included.

Name	Image	Town/City	Region	Type	Summary
AirSpace Gallery		Stoke-on-Trent	Stoke-on-Trent	Art	contemporary art gallery
Ancient High House		Stafford	Stafford	Historic house	Elizabethan timber-framed town house with different period room furnishings and displays, including the English Civil War, Edwardian and Victorian eras
Apedale Heritage Centre		Chesterton	Newcastle-under-Lyme	Mining	Coal mining history, artifacts, mine tours, Moseley Railway Trust's collection of narrow gauge industrial locomotives
Brampton Museum		Newcastle-under-Lyme	Newcastle-under-Lyme	History	
Bratch Pumping Station		Bratch	South Staffordshire	Technology	Victorian pumping station with steam engine, not currently open
Brindley's Mill and the James Brindley Museum		Leek	Staffordshire Moorlands	Mill	18th-century water-powered corn mill, exhibits about 18th-century canal builder James Brindley
Cheddleton Flint Mill		Cheddleton	Staffordshire Moorlands	Industry	Water mill built to grind flint for use in the pottery industry, miller's cottage, flint kilns, drying kiln and outbuildings
Chillington Hall		Brewood	South Staffordshire	Historic house	18th-century Georgian country house, reflects 800 years of family ownership, landscape designed by Capability Brown
Claymills Pumping Station		Burton upon Trent	East Staffordshire	Technology	Restored Victorian sewage pumping station with beam engines
Dudson Museum		Stoke-on-Trent	Stoke-on-Trent	Industry	history of the Dudson ceramic tableware company and ceramic items collection
Erasmus Darwin House		Lichfield	Lichfield	Historic house	18th-century-period home of poet and physician Erasmus Darwin, grandfather of naturalist Charles Darwin, biographical, science and poetry exhibits
Etruria Industrial Museum		Etruria	Stoke-on-Trent	Industry	19th-century bone and flint mill built to grind materials for the pottery industry, features working steam engine
Ford Green Hall		Smallthorne	Stoke-on-Trent	Historic house	17th-century timber-framed yeoman farmer's house with 17th-century furnishings, textiles, ceramics, and a period garden
Gladstone Pottery Museum		Longton	Stoke-on-Trent	Industry	Victorian pottery factory for making bone china tableware, includes original equipment, kilns, period doctor's house, decorative tile gallery, collection of Victorian decorative toilets
Izaak Walton's Cottage		Stafford	Stafford	Historic house	16th-century half-timbered cottage home of author Izaak Walton, exhibits on his life and the history of fishing
Keele University Art Gallery		Keele	Newcastle-under-Lyme	Art	
Kinver Edge and the Rock Houses		Kinver	South Staffordshire	Historic house	Operated by the National Trust, high sandstone ridge once home to Britain's last cave dwellers, features Holy Austin Rock Houses restored to Victorian appearance
Lichfield Museum		Lichfield	Lichfield	Local	Local history, features Staffordshire Millennium Embroideries with panels reflecting 1000 years of city history
Mill Meece Pumping Station		Millmeece	Stafford	Technology	Early-20th-century pumping station with steam engines
Moorcroft Heritage Visitor Centre		Burslem	Stoke-on-Trent	Industry	guided factory tour and museum with Moorcroft pottery
Moseley Old Hall		Fordhouses	South Staffordshire	Historic house	Operated by the National Trust, 17th-century-period house and garden, famous as one of the hiding places of King Charles II after his defeat at the Battle of Worcester in 1651
National Brewery Centre		Burton upon Trent	East Staffordshire	Industry	History of brewing, brewing artifacts, vintage vehicle collection, working steam engine
Newcastle Museum & Art Gallery		Newcastle-under-Lyme	Newcastle-under-Lyme	Multiple	also known as Borough Museum & Art Gallery, Victorian street scene including ironmonger, pawnbroker and chemist shops, doctor's office, toys, 1930s-1940s period house, exhibits of contemporary design and crafts
Nicholson Museum & Art Gallery		Leek	Staffordshire Moorlands	Art	
Potteries Museum & Art Gallery		Hanley	Stoke-on-Trent	Multiple	Fine art, decorative arts including collection of Staffordshire ceramics, local history, natural history
Raven Mason Collection		Newcastle-under-Lyme	Newcastle-under-Lyme	Art	operated by Keele University, collection of Mason ironstone and porcelain items, located in Keele Hall
Redfern’s Cottage: Museum of Uttoxeter Life		Uttoxeter	East Staffordshire	Local	local history
Samuel Johnson Birthplace Museum		Lichfield	Lichfield	Biographical	Reconstructed rooms, life and work of author Samuel Johnson
Shire Hall Gallery		Stafford	Stafford	Art	Exhibits of visual art, crafts and photography, also restored 19th-century court room
Shugborough Hall		Milford	Cannock Chase	Living	Owned by the National Trust and operated by Staffordshire County Council, 18th-century-period country house, walled kitchen garden and working model farm including operating water mill and museum - "The Complete Working Historic Estate"
Spode Works Visitor Centre		Stoke-on-Trent	Stoke-on-Trent	Industry	History and examples of Spode pottery and porcelain
Stafford Castle		Stafford	Stafford	History	Ruined remains of a 19th-century recreation of a medieval castle, visitor centre exhibits about the original and current castles, medieval life displays
Staffordshire History Centre		Stafford	Stafford	History	
Staffordshire County Museum		Milford	Cannock Chase	Local	Located in the Servants' Quarters of Shugborough Hall
Staffordshire Regiment Museum		Whittington	Lichfield	Military	Regimental history, uniforms, weapons, medals, regalia, replica World War I trench, armoured vehicles
Staffordshire Yeomanry Museum		Stafford	Stafford	Military	Located in the attic floor of the Ancient High House, history and memorabilia of the Staffordshire Yeomanry
Tamworth Castle		Tamworth	Tamworth	Historic house	11th-century Norman motte-and-bailey castle with late medieval Great Hall, Tudor chambers and Victorian suit of receptions rooms
Letocetum / Wall Roman Site		Wall	Lichfield	Archaeology	Operated by English Heritage, owned by the National Trust as "Letocetum Roman Baths and Museum", remains of a Roman settlement and museum of artifacts
Wedgwood Museum		Barlaston	Stafford	Art	History and displays of Wedgwood ceramics, founder Josiah Wedgwood, process of making the ceramics
Weston Park		Weston-under-Lizard	South Staffordshire	Historic house	17th-century-period grand house and gardens, estate with landscape designed by Capability Brown, art gallery in a restored 17th-century granary
Whitmore Hall		Whitmore	Newcastle-under-Lyme	Historic house	17th-century house open on a limited basis

== Defunct museums ==
- Ceramica, Burslem, closed in 2011
- Museum of Cannock Chase, closed 2026.
- Coors Visitor Centre, collections now part of the National Brewery Centre, Burton upon Trent

== See also ==
- Category:Tourist attractions in Staffordshire
