= Alexander Farquharson =

British politician

Alexander Charles Farquharson in 1919

Alexander Charles Farquharson (15 March 1864 – 27 May 1951) was a Scottish doctor, barrister, soldier and Liberal Party politician.

== Family and education ==
Alexander Charles Farquharson was the son of James and Jane Farquharson of Aberdeen.

He attended Peterhead Academy and then went on to a successful career as a student of medicine at Glasgow University where he was one of the founders of the Students' University Union and the Students' Representative Council. He passed his Bachelor of Medicine, Master of Surgery (MB, CM), with commendation, in 1889 proceeding taking his MD in 1891. He was also awarded a BSc in 1894 and the Diploma in Public Health (Cambridge) in 1890.

In 1903, he married Elizabeth Dodington Blockley, the daughter of Edward Blockley of the Isle of Wight. They had no children.

== Career ==
=== Medicine ===
Farquharson went into medical practice at Spennymoor in County Durham. He had a wide range of medical interests including Public health and mental health issues. He was sometime Senior Assistant Medical Officer of Burntwood Asylum in Staffordshire. After his political career, Farquharson went back into practice for some years and over the course of his career he undertook work on behalf of the British Medical Association. He represented his Division in the Representative Body in 1906; and afterwards from 1911 to 1921 except for one or two short intervals he was a member of the Central Council and did a full share of committee work. He was sometime President of the North of England Branch. He also served as a Governor of the Royal Scottish Corporation, a charity providing for Scottish people suffering hardship or seeking to improve their lives.

=== The law ===
It is not clear that he ever practised law, or intended to, but Farquharson studied it and became a member of the Middle Temple. It is clear that this experience helped him in his political and public work. He was remembered as a good speaker with experience of many kinds, possessing a fund of common sense, always heard with attention and well liked by his colleagues.

=== Military service ===
Farquharson was a keen member of the Territorial Force. He was appointed a Second lieutenant of the 2nd Volunteer Battalion, Durham Light Infantry, on 28 May 1902. When the First World War broke out, he was gazetted as Captain and in 1915 was appointed to the HQ Staff of the Territorial Force 63rd (2nd Northumbrian) Division. A year later he transferred to the Royal Army Medical Corps and took up post as Deputy Assistant Director of Medical Services on the staff of the Surgeon-General. He served until the end of the war and was twice mentioned for valuable services.

== Politics ==
While a doctor in Spennymoor, Farquharson had for a time been a member of Durham County Council. During the course of the war the Liberal MP for Leeds North, Sir Rowland Barran indicated that he wished to stand down at the next election, probably to concentrate more on his business interests as in 1918 he became chairman of the family firm of clothing manufacturers, taking over that position from his brother. Farquharson was selected to replace him.

At the 1918 general election, Farquharson stood as the Coalition Liberal candidate. He was not opposed by the Unionists and seems to have received the Coalition coupon. Fighting a Labour candidate and a representative of the National Party, Farquharson received 74.7% of the poll and a majority of 10,440 votes. However he chose not to contest the 1922 general election and did not stand for Parliament again.

== Appointments ==
In 1920, Farquharson was appointed to sit on an Inter-Departmental Committee to inquire into the sale of bread by weight set up by the Food Controller (the official in charge of the regulation of the supply and consumption of food and the encouragement of food production during and immediately after the First World War).

Also in that year, Farquharson became a member of a Parliamentary committee to look into MPs salaries and expenses.

== Death ==
He died in London 27 May 1951 at the age of 87.

== Publications ==
- Ptomaines and other Animal Alkaloids; Auto Toxæmia; J Wright & Co, Bristol, 1892
- Organic Sulphur Compounds in Nervous Diseases; (date n/k)
- Medico-Legal Importance of Ptomaines; (date n/k)
- The Law in relation to Pollution of Rivers (date n/k)

Parliament of the United Kingdom
Preceded by Rowland Barran	Member of Parliament for Leeds North; 1918 – 1922	Succeeded by Hugh Myddleton Butler
