= St Edward's Hospital =

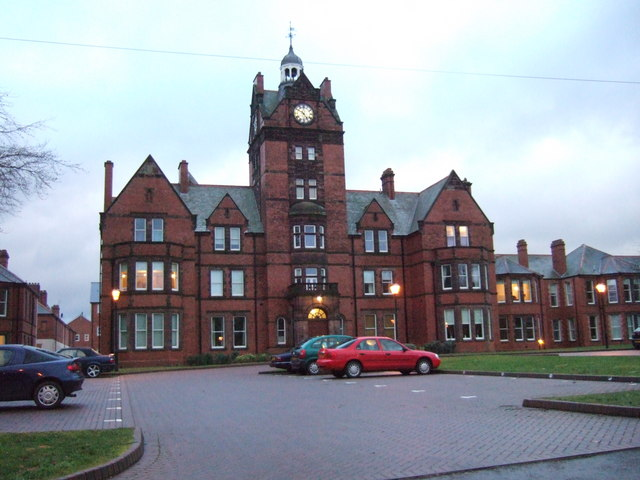
- The former St Edward's Hospital in 2007, now converted into housing

- Shown in Staffordshire

Geography
- Location: Cheddleton, England
- Coordinates: 53°4′49″N 2°2′24″W

Organisation
- Type: Mental health

History
- Founded: 1892
- Closed: 2002

St Edward's Hospital was a mental health facility at Cheddleton in Staffordshire, England. The hospital closed in 2002 and was converted into apartments and houses.

== History ==
=== Background ===
Cheddleton was the third and final county asylum in Staffordshire (although smaller private asylums existed), built to accommodate patients from the north and supplement Burntwood Asylum and Stafford Asylum. After carrying out at least 13 site inspections to sites including Bramshall, Knenhall near Moddershall, and Wetley Rocks, 175 acres (71 ha) were purchased for £12,750 in February 1892 on the edge of the village of Cheddleton. The site was located on a spur of land overlooking the River Churnet and the Caldon Canal at Cheddleton Heath just north of Cheddleton.

A competition was held for the design of the asylum for which 30 entries were received. The brief requested a design to accommodate 300 male and 300 female patients, and following standard practice they would lead segregated lives from one another on opposite sides of the asylum. The winning design was by London-based architects Giles, Gough and Trollope, with construction beginning in 1895.

=== Construction ===
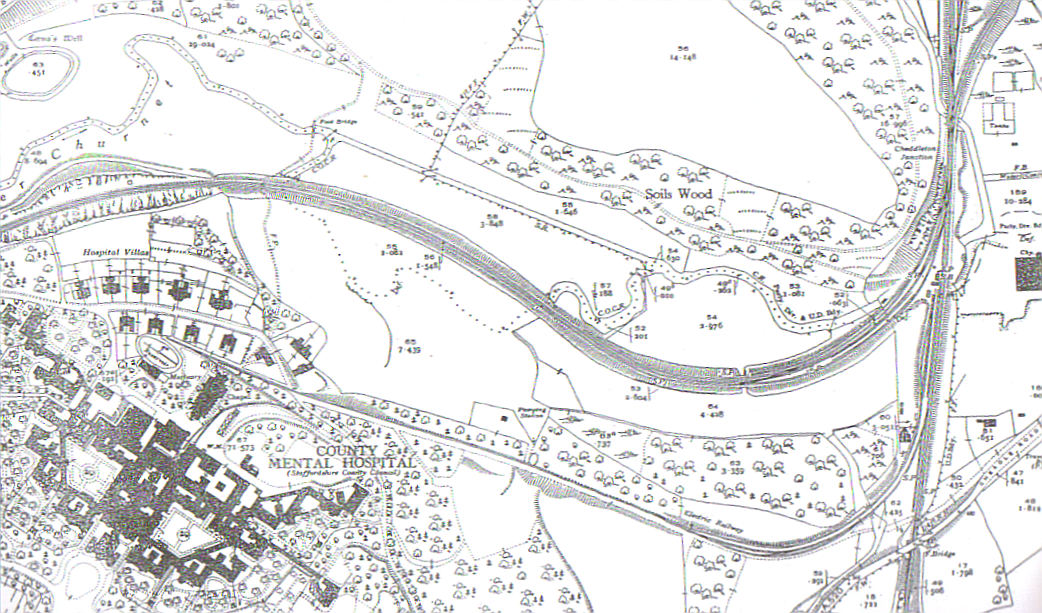
Map of the hospital and tramway, with connections to the NSR's Churnet Valley Railway

Following a tender exercise, W Brown & Son of Salford were selected with a contract price of £164,250. To assist in construction of the hospital - which required the shipment of over 18 million bricks - the contractors laid a 0.75 miles (1.21 km) line from the North Staffordshire Railway's (NSR) Churnet Valley Line at Leek Brook to the hospital site. Brown's used a small 0-4-0 Tank engine called Weaver (Manning Wardle H-class 1072) to transport both men and materials to the construction site.

=== Layout ===
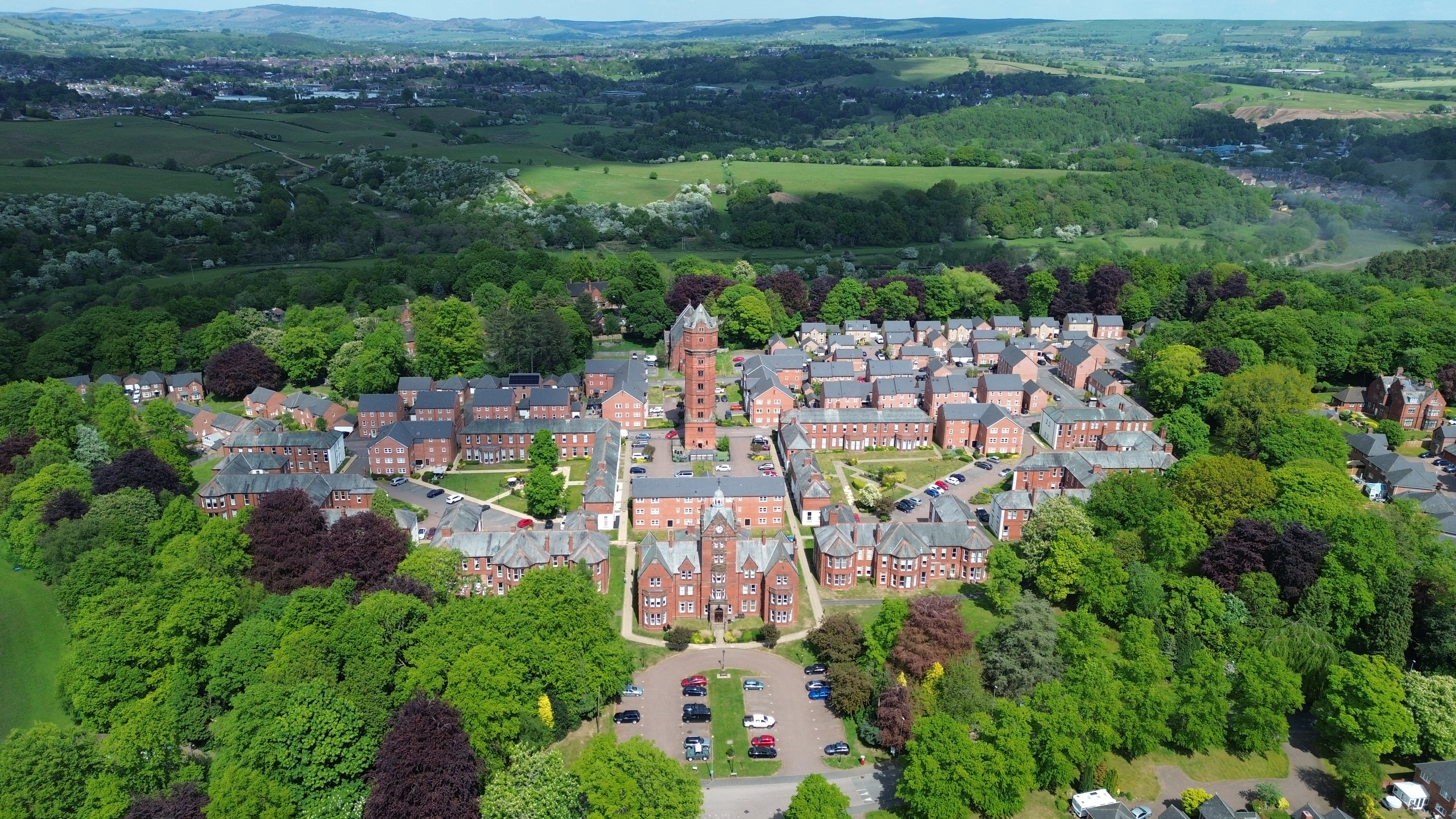
Aerial view of Former St Edward's Hospital

Cheddleton Asylum was laid out in the chevron or echelon style on a south facing plateau. At the apex of the echelon was the administration building which was flanked on either side by four ward blocks. The wards (infirmary, recent, acute, and epileptic) and within the echelon the quiet and working patients' ward. Those wards to the right or east housed male patients whilst females lived on the west side - there were two separate keys for each side of the building, to ensure that patients never mixed.

The asylum was atypical for its time, in that it was a self-contained and self-sufficient village in its own right with farms and workshops that produced both the uniforms for patients and staff. On the male side there were the various artisans' workshops: brick layers; brush makers; carpenters; cobblers; electricians; painters; plumbers and upholsters. These trades also employed male patients to help in the running of the asylum.

Due to its location the asylum generated its own electricity via four Lancashire boilers that powered three turbo-generators to light the wards and run the electric tramway. The architectural signature of the asylum was its water tower, which at 136 feet (41 m) tall held 156 tons of water that was electrically pumped there from the asylum's 110 feet (34 m) deep well.

In 1937 there were discussions on creating an internal currency to reward patients for their toil. A system of brass tokens was introduced with face values from ½d to 4/- each denomination varied in shape from circular, oval, hexagonal and octagonal.

=== Redevelopment ===
After closure in 2002, the entire site was sold to Redrow plc, which developed a modern housing estate in the former grounds, renovating the old and now listed hospital buildings into apartments.

== St Edward's Hospital tramway ==
Upon completion of the hospital in 1899, Staffordshire County Council took over the line and converted it to the 220 volt DC electrically powered St Edward's Hospital tramway. Passenger services ceased in 1920, while coal traffic to power the sites four Lancashire steam boilers continued until December 1954, when delivery by road took over. The line was closed and by May 1957 the line had been lifted.

== See also ==
- Listed buildings in Cheddleton
- Healthcare in Staffordshire
- List of hospitals in England
