= Richard Gerard =

Richard Gerard may refer to:

- Richard Gerard of Hilderstone (1635–1680), Roman Catholic landowner
- Richard Gerard (bishop), spiritual protector of the Jerusalem obedience of Order of Saint Lazarus
- Richard Geoffrey Gerard (1904–1997), New Zealand politician
