= Listed buildings in Cheddleton =

Cheddleton is a civil parish in the district of Staffordshire Moorlands, Staffordshire, England. It contains 84 listed buildings that are recorded in the National Heritage List for England. Of these, ten are at Grade II*, the middle of the three grades, and the others are at Grade II, the lowest grade. The parish contains the village of Cheddleton, smaller settlements, including the village of Wetley Rocks, and the surrounding area. The Caldon Canal joins its Leek Branch in the parish, and the listed buildings associated with these are bridges, locks, an aqueduct, and mileposts. Also in the parish is the Cheddleton Flint Mill, and its listed buildings consist of watermills, furnaces, sheds, and mill cottages. Most of the other listed buildings are houses, including two country houses, and associated structures, cottages, farmhouses and farm buildings. The remainder of the listed buildings include churches and items in churchyards, road bridges, a railway station, a school and library, a former hospital and associated buildings, and a series of road mileposts.

== Key ==
Grade	Criteria
II*	Particularly important buildings of more than special interest
II	Buildings of national importance and special interest

== Buildings ==
Name and location	Photograph	Date	Notes	Grade
Church of St Edward the Confessor; 53.06899°N 2.04474°W		13th century	The church was altered during the following centuries, and restored and altered in 1863–64 by George Gilbert Scott Jr. It is built in red sandstone, and has roofs of tile and lead. The church consists of a nave, north and south aisles, a south porch, a chancel, and a west tower. The tower has three stages, diagonal buttresses, a west doorway and window, a clock face on the south front, and an embattled parapet with corner crocketed pinnacles.	II*
Churchyard Cross; 53.06891°N 2.04457°W		15th century (possible)	The cross in the churchyard of the Church of St Edward the Confessor was restored in 1876 by George Gilbert Scott Jr. in collaboration with William Morris. It is in stone, circular, and has a base of four steps, a square shaft about 2 metres (6 ft 7 in) high with applied columns, and a capital and head with floral bands. Surmounting this are the instruments of the Passion in gableetted niches, and on the top is a short cusped cross. The cross is also a scheduled monument.	II
Felthouse and barn 53.05328°N 2.03349°W	—	15th century	The farmhouse and barn have a core with cruck construction, they were refaced in the 17th century, and altered in the 19th century. They are in stone, with some rebuilding in brick, and have tile roofs with verge parapets. The farmhouse has two storeys, a gabled single-storey projection at the front, three doorways, casement windows, and a hay loft opening. The barn to the left has two levels, consisting of a hay loft over byres. It contains five slit vents, windows with chamfered mullions, and a segmental-headed cart entry.	II
Mosslee Hall; 53.05302°N 2.00137°W	—	15th century	The farmhouse was originally timber framed and has since been extended, altered, and refaced in stone. It has a chamfered plinth, a floor band, a coped parapet, and tile roofs with coped gables and ball finials. There are two storeys and attics, an L-shaped plan, and a front of seven bays. The house has a two-storey porch with a coped parapet, most of the windows have retained their mullions, some have transoms, and there are bay windows, an oriel window, and a French window.	II*
Grange Farmhouse, mounting steps and walls 53.06697°N 2.04161°W	—	1499	The farmhouse was remodelled in 1692–97, extended in the 18th century, and altered in the 19th century. It is in sandstone with a moulded string course, and a tile roof with coped gables, kneelers and ball finials. There is one storey and an attic, and a front of four bays, the right bay projecting and gabled. The doorway has a chamfered surround, the windows have chamfered mullions, and there are two gabled dormers. In front of the house and at the rear are stone walls with plain coping, at the front are small monolithic gateposts, and a mounting block.	II
The Hall House; 53.06938°N 2.04314°W	—	c. 1500	Originally timber framed, the house was altered in about 1600 and in the 19th century, and is built in sandstone with quoins and a blue tile roof. There are two storeys and three bays. On the front is a doorway with a plain lintel, the windows on the front are casements, those in the upper floor in gabled dormers, and elsewhere is a sash window and an infilled mullioned window.	II
Finneylane Farmhouse; 53.07946°N 2.00667°W	—	1610	The farmhouse is in stone with quoins, and has a tile roof with pitched verge parapets and ball finials. There are two storey and an attic, and an H-shaped plan, with a front of five bays, the outer bays projecting and gabled. In the angle of the right wing is a lean-to porch with a Tudor arched entrance. Most of the windows have chamfered mullions, and on the front is a datestone.	II*
Basfordbridge Farmhouse; 53.05996°N 2.03176°W	—	Early 17th century	The farmhouse was extended later in the 17th century and altered in the 19th century. It is in stone with a tile roof, two storeys and an attic, and four bays. Most of the windows have chamfered mullions in deep moulded reveals. In the right gable end is a blocked owl hole.	II
Basford Hall Farmhouse; 53.05931°N 2.01826°W	—	17th century	The farmhouse is in stone with a moulded floor band, and a tile roof with pitched verge parapets. There are two storeys, a cellar and an attic, and a front of four bays. The windows have chamfered mullions.	II
Denford Farmhouse; 53.07869°N 2.06713°W	—	17th century	The farmhouse, which was altered and extended in the 19th century, is partly in stone and partly in painted brick, and has a tile roof. There are two storeys and two bays. At the right end is a gabled porch, there is a three-light chamfered mullioned window, and the other windows are casements.	II
Ford Farmhouse; 53.06217°N 2.06981°W	—	17th century	The farmhouse, which was altered in the 20th century, is in stone with a tile roof. There are two storeys and an attic, a front of three bays, and a later single-storey lean-to on the right. The outer bays project, most of the windows have been replaced by casements, and in the right gable end is a three-light mullioned and transomed attic window.	II
Barn east of Grange Farmhouse; 53.06696°N 2.04111°W	—	17th century	The barn, which was altered and extended in the 19th century, is in stone, and has verge parapets on corbelled kneelers to the right. The barn contains a full-height cart entry, openings with heavy lintels, and two rows of slit vents.	II
Ivy House Farmhouse; 53.04881°N 2.07535°W	—	17th century	The farmhouse, which was later altered, is in stone with a tile roof. There are two low storeys and four bays. On the front is a gabled porch, the windows have chamfered mullions, and at the left end is a double cart door.	II
Barn north of Mosslee Hall; 53.05317°N 2.00130°W	—	17th century	The barn is of cruck construction, and was altered in the 20th century. It is in stone and has a tile roof with verge parapets. There are two levels, consisting of a hay loft above a byre, later used as a garage. The barn contains a sliding door and a top-hung casement window, and inside there is a cruck truss.	II
Barn south of Rownall Farmhouse; 53.04783°N 2.07586°W	—	17th century	The barn, which has been altered, is in stone with a chamfered eaves course and a tile roof. There are two levels, consisting of a hay loft over byres, and four bays. The barn contains three hay loft openings, four doorways, and two windows.	II
Sundial; 53.06879°N 2.04471°W	—	17th century (possible)	The sundial is in the churchyard of the Church of St Edward the Confessor, and is in stone. It has an octagonal base, and a square shaft about 1.2 metres (3 ft 11 in) high. There are inscriptions on two of the faces and under the rim.	II
Barn and cow house northwest of The Felthouse; 53.05365°N 2.03361°W	—	17th century	The building is in stone and has a tile roof with verge parapets on corbelled kneelers. There are two levels, consisting of a hay loft over byres and sheds. In the upper level are a hay loft door and slit vents, and the ground floor contains door openings with heavy lintels and casement windows.	II
Catswall Farmhouse; 53.07421°N 2.07654°W	—	Early 18th century	The farmhouse was extended in the 19th century. The original part is in stone with two storeys, the extension is in brick and is gabled with two storeys and an attic, and the roof is tiled with verge parapets. The early part has three-light mullioned casement windows, and in the later part the windows are sashes.	II
Barn east of Catswall Farmhouse; 53.07424°N 2.07620°W	—	Early 18th century	The barn is in stone with a chamfered eaves band on the left, a brick band on the right, and a tile roof. There are two levels, consisting of a hay loft over cattle sheds, and five bays. On the front is a large stone buttress.	II
Long Meadows Farmhouse; 53.03922°N 2.05223°W	—	Early 18th century	The farmhouse, which was later extended, is in stone and has a slate roof with verge parapets. There are two storeys, an L-shaped plan, a front of three bays, and a later projecting pair of gables at the right end. On the front is a lean-to porch, and the windows are mullioned casements.	II
Rownall Farmhouse; 53.04803°N 2.07585°W	—	Early 18th century	The farmhouse is in stone and has a tile roof with verge parapets. There are two storeys, four bays, and a 20th-century lean-to on the right. On the front is a doorway, and the windows are casements, most with mullions.	II
25 Hollow Lane; 53.06855°N 2.04493°W	—	18th century	The house was altered and extended in the 19th century. The lower two floors are in stone, the top floor is in brick, and the roof is tiled, with verge parapets on the left. There are three storeys and two bays. The doorway is in the centre, and the windows are casements with segmental heads and keystones.	II
Churchyard wall 53.06878°N 2.04462°W	—	18th century (probable)	The wall that surrounds the churchyard of the Church of St Edward the Confessor was partly rebuilt in about 1876. It is in stone, on the south side it has roll-crested pitched coping, and elsewhere the coping is plain.	II
Barn stables southwest of Ivy House Farmhouse; 53.04865°N 2.07576°W	—	18th century (probable)	The barn and stables are in stone with a stone slate roof, and at the east end is a lean-to with a corrugated concrete roof. The building contains various openings, including windows and doors.	II
Sneyd Farmhouse; 53.06232°N 2.01537°W	—	18th century	The farmhouse is in stone and has a tile roof with pitched verge parapets. There are two storeys, an L-shaped plan, a recessed wing to the right and another wing on the left. The doorway has a corbelled moulded hood, and the windows are casements.	II
North mill, Cheddleton Flint Mill; 53.07095°N 2.04285°W		1756–65	A watermill for grinding flint, it is in red brick with sandstone quoins with a tile roof. There are two storeys with a lean-to on the left. In the west front is a doorway and above it is a cast iron casement window, both with segmental heads. The right gable end houses a timber and cast iron undershot waterwheel.	II*
Furnaces, Cheddleton Flint Mill; 53.07080°N 2.04329°W		Late 18th century	The furnaces are in sandstone with some brick dressings. The walls are about 2 metres (6 ft 7 in) high, they have buttresses, and there are three furnace openings, two with elliptical arches.	II*
Mill cottage southeast of Cheddleton Flint Mill; 53.07058°N 2.04313°W		Late 18th century	A stone cottage with a tile roof, two storeys and two bays, the right corner chamfered. To the left is a glazed porch, and the windows are casements.	II*
Cumberledge Park Farmhouse; 53.07721°N 2.06614°W	—	Late 18th century	A red brick farmhouse that has a tile roof with stone coped parapets on corbelled kneelers. There are two storeys and an attic, two bays, and a single-storey extension on the right. The central doorway and the windows, which are three-light casements, have segmental heads.	II
Cottage north of Felthouse Lane; 53.05384°N 2.04951°W	—	Late 18th century	The cottage is in stone and has a tile roof with verge parapets. There are two low storeys and two bays. In the centre is a doorway, and the windows are casements, some with mullions.	II
Heath House Farmhouse; 53.05892°N 2.04831°W	—	Late 18th century	The farmhouse is in red brick with painted stone dressings and a tile roof with verge parapets. There are three storeys and four bays. On the front is a projecting flat-roofed porch with a round-headed entrance. The right bay is wider and contains a two-storey flat-roofed bay window, and the other windows are sashes with raised keystones.	II
Memorial north of Church of St Edward; 53.06905°N 2.04501°W	—	Late 18th century	The memorial is in the churchyard, and is a chest tomb in stone. It has pilasters at the angles with fleurons on the heads, and there is a fluted frieze under a moulded top slab.	II
Hazelhurst Bottom Lock; 53.08059°N 2.07547°W		c. 1779	The lock is on the Caldon Canal, and the gates date from about 1981. It has stone retaining walls with repairs in blue brick and concrete. On the lower face are sandstone steps, and there is a catwalk with wrought iron spandrels.	II
Godwin memorial 53.06888°N 2.04475°W	—	1795	The memorial is in the churchyard of the Church of St Edward the Confessor, and is to the memory of Richard Godwin. It is a chest tomb in stone, and has a moulded plinth, waisted pilasters at the angles, and elliptical inscribed side panels with fan motifs in the spandrels.	II
Leek memorial 53.06895°N 2.04468°W	—	1795	The memorial is in the churchyard of the Church of St Edward the Confessor, and is to the memory of Ralph Leek. It is in stone and consists of a heavy plinth rising and tapering to an obelisk with blind trefoil-headed lucarnes on the faces.	II
Basford Bridge; 53.06610°N 2.02832°W		Late 18th or early 19th century	The bridge carries Basford Bridge Lane over the River Churnet. It is in red sandstone, and consists of three elliptical arches. Between the aches are piers and pontoons, at carriageway level is moulding, and the parapets are low and nearly horizontal.	II
Bridge over River Churnet; 53.07017°N 2.04220°W	—	Late 18th or early 19th century	The bridge carries Cheadle Road, the A520 road, over the River Churnet. It is in stone with rusticated abutments, and consists of a single elliptical arch. The bridge has substantial voussoirs, a moulded string course, and parapets with square coping, and the abutments are splayed at the ends.	II
Lodge Farmhouse and barn 53.06111°N 2.01560°W	—	Late 18th or early 19th century	The farmhouse and barn are in stone with dentilled eaves, and a tile roof with verge parapets. The two are continuous, with two storeys, and at the left end is a lean-to containing the entrance. The farmhouse to the left has two-light mullioned casement windows, and the barn with a hayloft above contains three windows and two doors.	II
Carriage sheds, dairy and Home Farmhouse, Ashcombe Park; 53.05778°N 2.04042°W	—	1806	The buildings are in stone with tile roofs and form an L-shaped plan. The entrance front is symmetrical, with two storeys, and a central pavilion containing an elliptical-headed carriage arch. Above the arch are two segmental-headed casement windows, a circular dated plaque, and an open pediment. Elsewhere there are two further elliptical carriage arches and casement windows.	II
Cart shed and barn Ashcombe Park; 53.05705°N 2.04150°W	—	c. 1806	The refacing of an earlier barn, the cartshed and barn are in stone, and have a tile roof with verge parapets. There are two levels, consisting of hay lofts over carriage sheds. In the northeast front is a full-height opening with a segmental head, flanked by two similar openings that are partly blocked.	II
Ornamental pool, Ashcombe Park; 53.05799°N 2.03997°W	—	c. 1806	The pool in front of the house is in stone, it is circular, about 2 metres (6 ft 7 in) in diameter, and has a raised rim with a rolled lip. Surrounding it is a paved walkway, and in the centre is a pedestal bearing the statue of a nymph.	II
Stables, Ashcombe Park; 53.05764°N 2.04029°W	—	c. 1806	The stables are in stone with a hipped slate roof. There is an L-shaped plan, with four gables on the main range and one on the wing. Each stable has a doorway and a two-light casement window, and on the roof are two small pyramidal vent cupolas.	II
Tunnel between stables and Ashcombe Park; 53.05800°N 2.04042°W	—	c. 1806	The tunnel between the stables and the house consists of a stone vault about 35 metres (115 ft) long, 2 metres (6 ft 7 in) wide, and 2 metres (6 ft 7 in) high. At the south end is a retaining wall and a door.	II
Ashcombe Park; 53.05813°N 2.04067°W		1807–11	A small country house, it was extended later in the 19th century. The house is in sandstone, on a plinth, with a band and cornice between the floors, at the top is a blocking course, and it has a hipped slate roof. There are two storeys and a front of four bays. On the front is a Tuscan tetrastyle porte-cochère with a cornice and side lights. The windows are sashes, those in the ground floor with round-arched surrounds. The garden front has six bays, and at the rear are an orangery and a service courtyard.	II*
Basin in walled garden, Ashcombe Park; 53.05736°N 2.04178°W	—	c. 1808	The basin in the centre of the walled garden is in stone. It is about 2 metres (6 ft 7 in) in diameter, and has a roll-moulded lip.	II
Garden walls southwest of Ashcombe Park; 53.05724°N 2.04224°W		1808	The walls surround a kitchen garden, they are in red brick with stone copings, and are about 3 metres (9.8 ft) high with sides about 120 metres (390 ft) long. The walls are ramped to the corners, where they are curved, and buttressed on the outer sides. The entrance is in the northeast corner, and in the centre of the northeast wall is an elliptical date plaque.	II
Bagnall memorial 53.06902°N 2.04454°W	—	1816	The memorial is in the churchyard of the Church of St Edward the Confessor, and is to the memory of John Bagnall. It is a chest tomb in stone, and has a moulded plinth, reeded pilasters at the angles, the capitals have fleuron heads, and on the sides are elliptical inscribed panels.	II
Canal milepost at SJ 980 523; 53.06789°N 2.03015°W		1820	The milepost is on the towpath of the Caldon Canal. It is in cast iron, and consists of a circular shaft, two convex plaques, and a domed top. On the plaques are the distances to Etruria and Uttoxeter, and on the shaft is a quatrefoil with the date and details of the manufacturer.	II
Canal milepost at SJ 9842 5080; 53.05451°N 2.02523°W		1820	The milepost is on the towpath of the Caldon Canal. It is in cast iron, and consists of a circular shaft, two convex plaques, and a domed top. On the plaques are the distances to Etruria and Uttoxeter, and on the shaft is a quatrefoil with the date and details of the manufacturer.	II
19 Hollow Lane; 53.06866°N 2.04465°W	—	Early 19th century	The house, which possibly incorporates earlier material, is in painted brick with stone quoins on the left, dentilled eaves, and a tile roof. There are two storeys and one bay. The doorway and the windows, which are three-light casements, have segmental heads.	II
The Bath House southeast of Basford Hall; 53.05785°N 2.01562°W	—	Early 19th century	The building, which originally housed a heated swimming bath, is dressed as a folly. It is in stone with a string course, and has a tile roof with crested verge parapets on corbelled kneelers. There are two storeys and an attic, and a front of three bays. The outer bays project and are gabled, the right gable being larger, and each bay contains a Tudor arched entrance. The windows are either mullioned or transomed. At the rear and the northeast are embattled towers facing the lake, one square, the other octagonal.	II
Folly Tower southwest of The Bath House; 53.05765°N 2.01586°W	—	Early 19th century	The folly tower is in stone, and has an embattled parapet on corbels. It has a circular plan and two storeys, and attached is a circular stair tower with three storeys. On the main tower are two-light mullioned windows, and the entrance is at the rear.	II
Bridge No 37 (Hazelhurst Lock Bridge); 53.08061°N 2.07496°W		Early 19th century	An accommodation bridge over the Caldon Canal, it is in stone with rounded copings, and consists of a single elliptical arch with a string course. The parapets and carriageway are cambered over the span, and end in piers set out diagonally.	II
Bridge No 41 (Spring's Bridge); 53.07284°N 2.04747°W		Early 19th century	An accommodation bridge over the Caldon Canal, it is in stone with rounded copings, and consists of a single elliptical arch with a string course. The parapets and carriageway are cambered over the span, and end in piers.	II
Bridge No 43 (Cheddleton Bridge); 53.06989°N 2.04084°W		Early 19th century	An accommodation bridge over the Caldon Canal, it is in brick with stone cappings, and consists of a single elliptical arch with slightly concave faces. The parapet and the carriageway are cambered over the span.	II
Bridge No 44 (Basford Bridge); 53.06608°N 2.02913°W		Early 19th century	The bridge carries Basford Bridge Lane over the Caldon Canal. It is in stone with slightly concave faces, and consists of a single elliptical arch. The bridge has a raised voussoir band, and the parapets and the carriageway are inclined upwards to the west.	II
Bridge No 47 (Willow Cottage Bridge); 53.05507°N 2.02643°W		Early 19th century	An accommodation bridge over the Caldon Canal, it is in brick with stone capping on the piers. The bridge consists of a single elliptical arch with slightly concave faces. The parapet and the carriageway are cambered over the span.	II
Mill Cottage adjacent to Cheddleton Flint Mill; 53.07070°N 2.04298°W		Early 19th century	The cottage is in stone, and has a tile roof with verge parapets. There are two storeys and two bays. The doorway is slightly to the right of centre, and the windows are small-pane casements, those to the left with two lights, and those to the right with single lights.	II*
Slip drying kiln and sheds, Cheddleton Flint Mill; 53.07082°N 2.04314°W		Early 19th century	The building is in two parts, each with a single storey and an attic; the left part is in stone, the right part is in brick, and the roofs are tiled, with verge parapets to the west. At the rear is a lean-to drying floor, which is partly open, and also at the rear is a chimney about 10 metres (33 ft) high.	II*
Hazlehurst Roving Bridge; 53.07980°N 2.06995°W		Early 19th century	A roving bridge on the Leek Branch of the Caldon Canal, it is in stone with rounded copings, and consists of a single elliptical arch with concave faces. The bridge has a string course, the parapets and carriageway are cambered over the span, and they end in piers on the west side.	II
Bridge at SJ 950 536; 53.08003°N 2.07483°W	—	Early 19th century	An accommodation bridge over the Leek Branch of the Caldon Canal, it is in stone with rounded copings, and consists of a single elliptical arch. The bridge has a string course, the parapets and carriageway are cambered over the span, and they end in piers.	II
Red Lion Inn; 53.06932°N 2.04204°W		Early 19th century	The public house has stone walls on the sides and rear, the front is in painted brick with quoins on the right, and it has a tile roof with verge parapets. There are three storeys and three bays. In the centre is a doorway with a quoined surround, above it is a circular window, and the other windows are casements, most with segmental heads.	II
Stables, Rownall Hall; 53.04130°N 2.07304°W	—	Early 19th century	The stables and coach house to the former hall, now demolished, have been converted for residential use. The building is in stone with a raised eaves band and a tile roof with verge parapets. It has a U-shaped plan, with two-storey pavilions in the centre and at the ends, and single-storey two-bay links. The central pavilion has a round-arched entry, and the windows are small-paned casements with raised surrounds. All the pavilions have gables with acroteria at the sides, and on the top of each is a double horse-head crest with an acroterion above. In each outer pavilion is a medallion with horses' heads in relief.	II
The Woodlands; 53.05263°N 2.03292°W	—	Early 19th century	A farmhouse in painted brick with a hipped tile roof. The main block has three storeys, three bays, and pilaster piers to the angles, and to the left is a lower, two-storey two-bay wing. In the centre is a flat-roofed projecting porch that has a dentilled recess, and a round-arched entrance with a keystone, and the windows are sashes.	II
Gates and gate piers, Wetley Abbey; 53.03051°N 2.05735°W	—	Early 19th century	The gate piers are in stone, they are square, about 2 metres (6 ft 7 in) high, and have pyramidal caps. The gates are in wrought iron, each has three panels with trefoil heads, a quatrefoil centre frieze, and cresting in the centre.	II
Wetley Abbey; 53.03066°N 2.05671°W	—	Late 1820s or early 1830s	A large stone house with parapets in Gothic style, it has two storeys and a basic cruciform plan. The entrance front has eight bays, the two right bays projecting under a pediment and containing a two-storey bay window. The other bays are taller, the middle two project under a larger pediment with a cross finial, and they have crocketed pinnacles. In the centre is a Tudor arched doorway with a fanlight and an ogee hood mould. The windows above are lancets with ogee heads. In the outer bays the windows are mullioned and transomed and have hood moulds.	II
St John's Church, Wetley Rocks; 53.04094°N 2.05552°W		1833–34	The chancel was added in 1901. The church is built in stone with a slate roof, and consists of a nave, north and south aisles, a chancel, and a west tower. The tower has three stages, diagonal buttresses, a west doorway with a pointed head, and an embattled parapet.	II
Basford Hall, stable wing and carriage entry 53.05890°N 2.01774°W	—	1830s	A country house in Tudor style that was enlarged in about 1856, it is in stone, the roof of the earlier part is slated, and the later part is tiled. There are two parallel ranges, and the entrance front has two gables with coats of arms. The left gable has a chimney breast and single-light windows. In the right gable is a porch with a cornice on corbels, and above it are mullioned and transomed windows, and there is an oriel window. To the right is a carriage entry with a Tudor arched carriageway and a corbelled dormer above. The stables are at right angles, and have two storeys, the central part is gabled with a datestone, over an oriel window and a Tudor arched doorway.	II
Smith memorial 53.06908°N 2.04505°W	—	1838	The memorial is in the churchyard of the Church of St Edward the Confessor and is to the memory of Edward Smith. It is a chest tomb in stone, and has a moulded plinth, pilasters at the angles, double-incised inscribed panels on the sides, and the slab has a moulded edge. The plinth to a former railed enclosure is still present.	II
Hazlehurst Aqueduct; 53.07988°N 2.06966°W		1841	The aqueduct was built to carry the Leek Branch of the Caldon Canal over its main line. It is in painted brick with stone dressings, and consists of a single round arch. The aqueduct has inset panels in the spandrels and a central inscribed plaque. At the top is a corbelled parapet, and the main face sweeps down and is tapered to end piers.	II
Cheddleton station 53.06583°N 2.02750°W		c. 1849	The station was built for the North Staffordshire Railway, and later used by the Churnet Valley Railway. It is in stone and has a tile roof with verge parapets, a moulded ridge, and ball finials, and it is in Tudor style. The station is in two parts; the main part has two storeys, and contains a gabled porch with a Tudor-arched entrance, and a gabled dormer. The other part is recessed and has one storey. The windows in both parts are mullioned, and on the platform front is a timber-boarded canopy on square columns.	II
Gates, piers, and railings, Ashcombe Park; 53.05926°N 2.04385°W	—	Mid 19th century	The entrance to the drive is flanked by gate piers and, from these, cast iron railings sweep in a curve of about 20 metres (66 ft) to outer piers. The piers are in rusticated stone, they are square, about 2.5 metres (8 ft 2 in) high, and the outer piers have ball finials. The gates are in wrought iron and are elaborate, with crested tops.	II
Lodge, Basford Hall; 53.06099°N 2.01588°W	—	Mid 19th century	The lodge, which was extended in 1882, is in stone with a tile roof. There are two storeys and three bays, the right bay projecting and gabled. On the front is a gabled two-storey porch with a Tudor arched entry, above which is a coat of arms. The gable to the right has verge parapets on corbelled kneelers, a finial and a datestone. The windows on the left part are mullioned, and in the gable they are mullioned and transomed, and there is an oriel window on massive corbels.	II
South mill, Cheddleton Flint Mill; 53.07081°N 2.04297°W		Mid 19th century	The superstructure of the mill is on an earlier core, the lower parts are in sandstone, the upper parts are in brick, and the roof is tiled. There are two storeys and an attic. In the south front is a doorway in the ground floor with a relieving arch above, steps lead up to a doorway in the upper floor, there is a casement window to its left, and in the gable is a circular opening. On the north front is a timber and cast iron undershot waterwheel.	II*
Lodge, Ashcombe Park; 53.05918°N 2.04378°W		1852	The lodge is in red sandstone with overhanging eaves, and has a roof of shaped tiles that have verges with cusped and fretted bargeboards and finials. There is one storey and an attic, a cruciform plan, and a front of three bays. The porch is gabled and has a Tudor arched entrance, and a coat of arms in the apex. On the road front is a canted bay window with a hipped roof.	II
Lychgate, St Edward's Church; 53.06875°N 2.04481°W		c. 1876	The lychgate was designed by George Gilbert Scott Jr., and is in stone with a saddleback roof. It is gabled and has a pointed entry arch in a recessed panel, above which are three stepped blind lancets and a coat of arms. At the sides are clasping buttresses with a quatrefoil frieze at the impost level.	II
School and library 53.06894°N 2.04516°W	—	c. 1876	The school and library to the west of St Edward's Church were designed by George Gilbert Scott Jr. The building is in stone with a string course, and has a tile roof with verge parapets. There are two storeys, the doorway has a moulded surround, an ogee head and a hood mould, and the windows are mullioned. In the south gable end is a window with curvilinear tracery.	II
St Edward's Hospital; 53.07864°N 2.04148°W		c. 1895–1899	A mental hospital designed by Giles, Gough and Trollope in Jacobean style, and later converted for residential use, it is built in brick with red sandstone dressings and slate roofs. The plan consists of a central administrative block linked by corridors to four recessed pavilions. The central block has two storeys and attics, and five bays, the outer bays projecting and gabled, and the central bay forming a five-storey clock tower. The clock tower contains a portico that has a round-arched entrance with a fanlight, over which is a balustrade and a two-storey canted bay window. Each side of the top storey has a pediment and a clock face, and it is surmounted by an ogee cupola with a weathervane. The outer bays contain two-storey bay windows, the second and fourth bays have smaller gables, and the windows are sashes. The pavilions are in a similar style and in the courtyard is a seven-storey octagonal water tower on a two-storey plinth, with a conical roof.	II
Chapel, St Edward's Hospital; 53.07997°N 2.03995°W	—	c. 1895–1899	The chapel, designed by Giles, Gough and Trollope in Decorated style, is built in brick with red sandstone dressings and slate roofs. It consists of a nave and a chancel, with a pinnacled bellcote. There is a single-storey entrance vestibule, and at the angles are buttresses rising to pinnacles with conical roofs.	II
Malloy House, St Edward's Hospital; 53.07825°N 2.03832°W	—	c. 1895–1900	The house was originally the home of the superintendent of the hospital and designed by Giles, Gough and Trollope. It is in brick with red sandstone dressings and slate roofs. There are two storeys and attics, and a front of four bays. The entrance bay protrudes slightly, it is gabled, and contains a round-headed entrance with pilasters, a keystone, and an entablature, and to the right is a window with a similar surround. Above and in the attic are three-light windows. Further to the right is a two-storey canted bay window, and there is a similar bay window in the left return. In the attic are dormers.	II
Milepost at SJ 972 519; 53.06496°N 2.04306°W		Early 20th century probable)	The milepost is on the east side of the A520 road. It is in cast iron, and has a triangular plan and a sloping top. On the top is "CHEDDLETON", and on the sides are the distances to Wetley Rocks, Hilderstone, Sandon, Stafford, Cheddleton, and Leek.	II
Milepost at SJ 967 505; 53.05267°N 2.04992°W		Early 20th century probable)	The milepost is on the east side of the A520 road. It is in cast iron, and has a triangular plan and a sloping top. On the top is "CHEDDLETON", and on the sides are the distances to Wetley Rocks, Hilderstone, Sandon, Stafford, Cheddleton, and Leek.	II
Milepost at SJ 964 490; 53.03844°N 2.05373°W		Early 20th century probable)	The milepost is on the east side of the A520 road. It is in cast iron, and has a triangular plan and a sloping top. On the top is "WETLEY ROCKS", and on the sides are the distances to Hilderstone, Sandon, Stafford, Cheddleton, and Leek.	II
Milepost at SJ 957 476; 53.02607°N 2.06514°W		Early 20th century probable)	The milepost is on the east side of the A520 road. It is in cast iron, and has a triangular plan and a sloping top. On the top is "CELLARHEAD", and on the sides are the distances to Hilderstone, Sandon, Stafford, Wetley Rocks, Cheddleton, and Leek.	II
