= St Edward's Hospital tramway =

Hospital tramway in Staffordshire, England

Coordinates: 53°4′49″N 2°2′24″W

Overview
- Status: Closed
- Owner: Staffordshire County Council
- Locale: Cheddleton, Staffordshire
- Termini: Leek Brook; St Edward's Hospital

Service
- Type: Tram

History
- Opened: 1899
- Closed: 1954

Technical
- Line length: 0.75 mi (1.21 km)
- Track gauge: 4 ft 8 1/2 in (1,435 mm) standard gauge
- Electrification: Overhead catenary

The St Edward's Hospital tramway was a tramway built for Staffordshire County Council for the construction of the St Edward's County Mental Asylum at Cheddleton, Staffordshire. Opened in 1899, the line ran until 1954 before being closed and scrapped.

== Construction ==
The County Mental Hospital, also known as St Edward's Hospital, was built in the late 1890s by the Staffordshire County Lunacy Committee to relieve overcrowding in other institutions. The hospital was located on a spur of land overlooking the River Churnet and the Caldon Canal at Cheddleton Heath just north of Cheddleton. Designed by the London architects Giles, Gough and Trollope, construction began in 1895. To assist in construction of the hospital the contractors, W Brown & Son, laid a 0.75 miles (1.21 km) line from the North Staffordshire Railway's (NSR) Churnet Valley Line at Leek Brook to the hospital site. Brown's used a small 0-4-0 Tank engine called Weaver (Manning Wardle H-class 1072) to transport both men and materials to the construction site.

== Operation ==
Upon completion of the hospital in 1899, Staffordshire County Council took over the line and converted it to an electrically powered tramway, an overhead wire system was erected and the electricity, operated at 220 volt DC, was supplied from the hospital boiler house. Once electrification work was completed, in 1903, a new platform was constructed at Leek Brook station on the down (towards Leek) Churnet Valley line to allow passengers to alight from NSR trains and cross the platform to use the tramway to visit the hospital. The council purchased an electric locomotive from Wolverhampton and an old London horse tram was converted into a passenger coach; both vehicles were painted with the letters SCC to indicate their ownership by the county council. Although a passenger service was supplied, the principal function of the tramway was the supply of coal to the boiler house. About 200 long tons (203 t) was required each month, the NSR would deliver loaded wagons of coal to a siding at Leek Brook and the tram engine would propel the wagons, two at a time, to the boiler house with the empty wagons being returned to Leek Brook for collection.

After the First World War with the growth in bus and private car transport, there was a decline in passengers using the tramway so passenger services were discontinued in the 1920s. The coal traffic however continued until December 1954 when delivery by road took over and the line was closed and by May 1957 the line had been lifted.

== Route ==
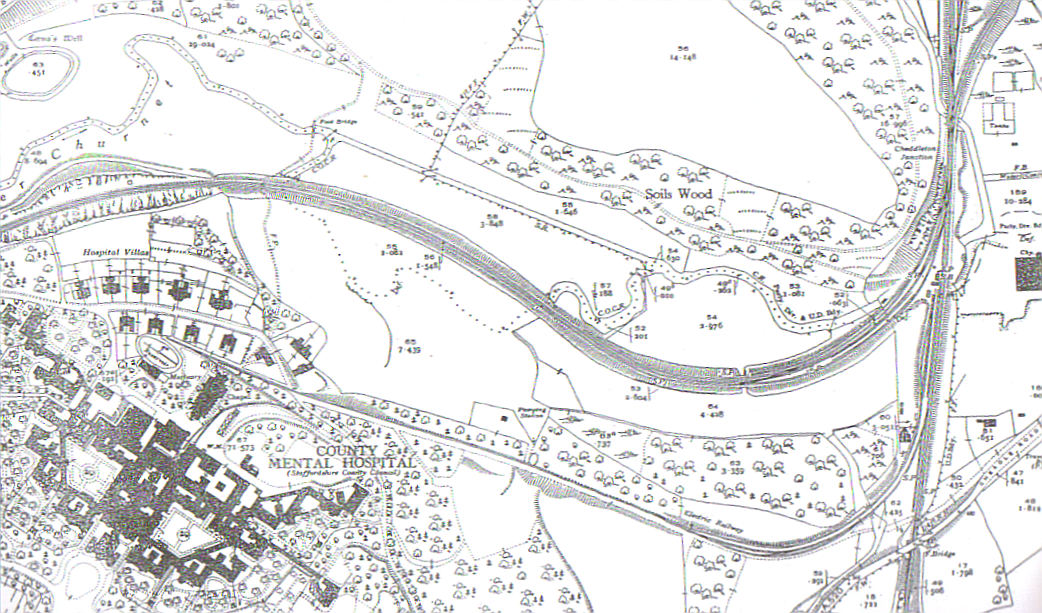
Map of tramway and connections to the NSR

From the platform at Leek Brook, the tramway swung to the right alongside the exchange sidings from the NSR. Railway engines were not allowed further than these sidings under the various agreements between the NSR (and its successor the London, Midland and Scottish Railway and also because being lightly built the tramway could not take the weight of railway locomotives. Past the sidings the line climbed steeply with a maximum gradient of 1:16.6 (6%) being encountered. The line then proceeded by way of a switchback arrangement to terminate at the rear of the main hospital building.
