= Wetley Rocks =

Village in Staffordshire, England

Coordinates: 53.0388°N 2.0532°W

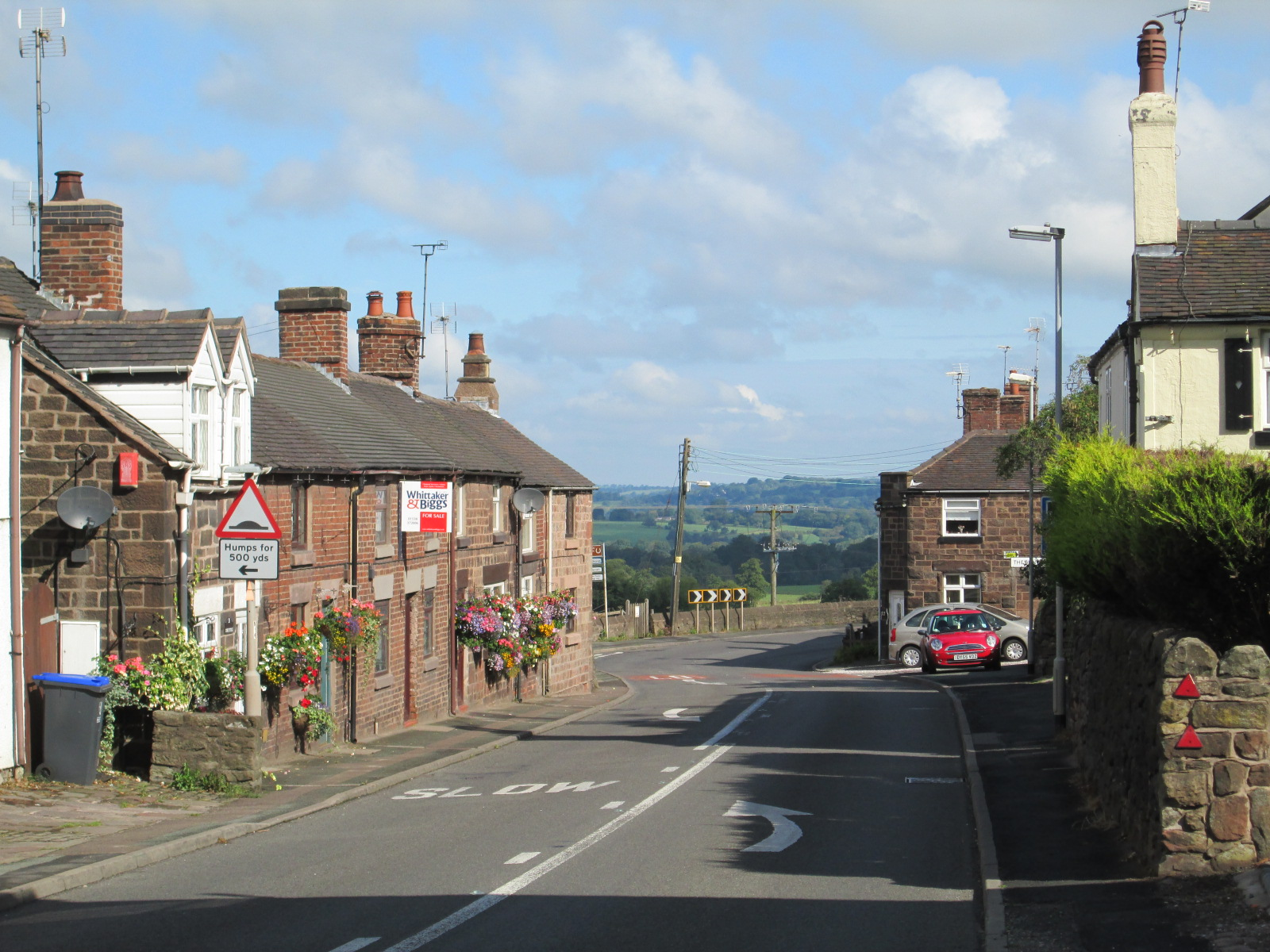
- Main Road, Wetley Rocks

- Location within Staffordshire
- OS grid reference: SJ965490
- District: Staffordshire Moorlands
- Shire county: Staffordshire
- Region: West Midlands
- Country: England
- Sovereign state: United Kingdom
- Post town: Stoke-on-Trent
- Postcode district: ST9
- Police: Staffordshire
- Fire: Staffordshire
- Ambulance: West Midlands

Wetley Rocks is a village in Staffordshire, England, about 2 miles (3.2 km) south of Cheddleton and 6 miles (9.7 km) south of Leek. For population details as taken at the 2011 census see under Consall.

It is on the A520 road which runs from Leek (to the north) to Stone (to the south), at the junction with the A522 road which runs from Wetley Rocks to Uttoxeter (to the south-east).

The village lies on a small north-south ridge; immediately to the east is the edge of a plateau, and there are rock outcrops of millstone grit along the northern part of the ridgeline; the outcrops have restricted the growth of the village east of the A520. The name of the village comes from these rock outcrops, and from the nature of the pasture land (ley or lea being pasture). A local quarry, part of the same outcrop, provided the stone for many of the original buildings.

It is in the local government district of Staffordshire Moorlands.

On the northern edge of the village is a public house The Powys Arms, and a petrol station.

Wetley Abbey, about half a mile south of the village, is a large building built in the early 19th century in Gothic style (it has no religious connections); it is now a care home. It was at one time the home of the 19th-century painter George Hemming Mason.

== Churches ==
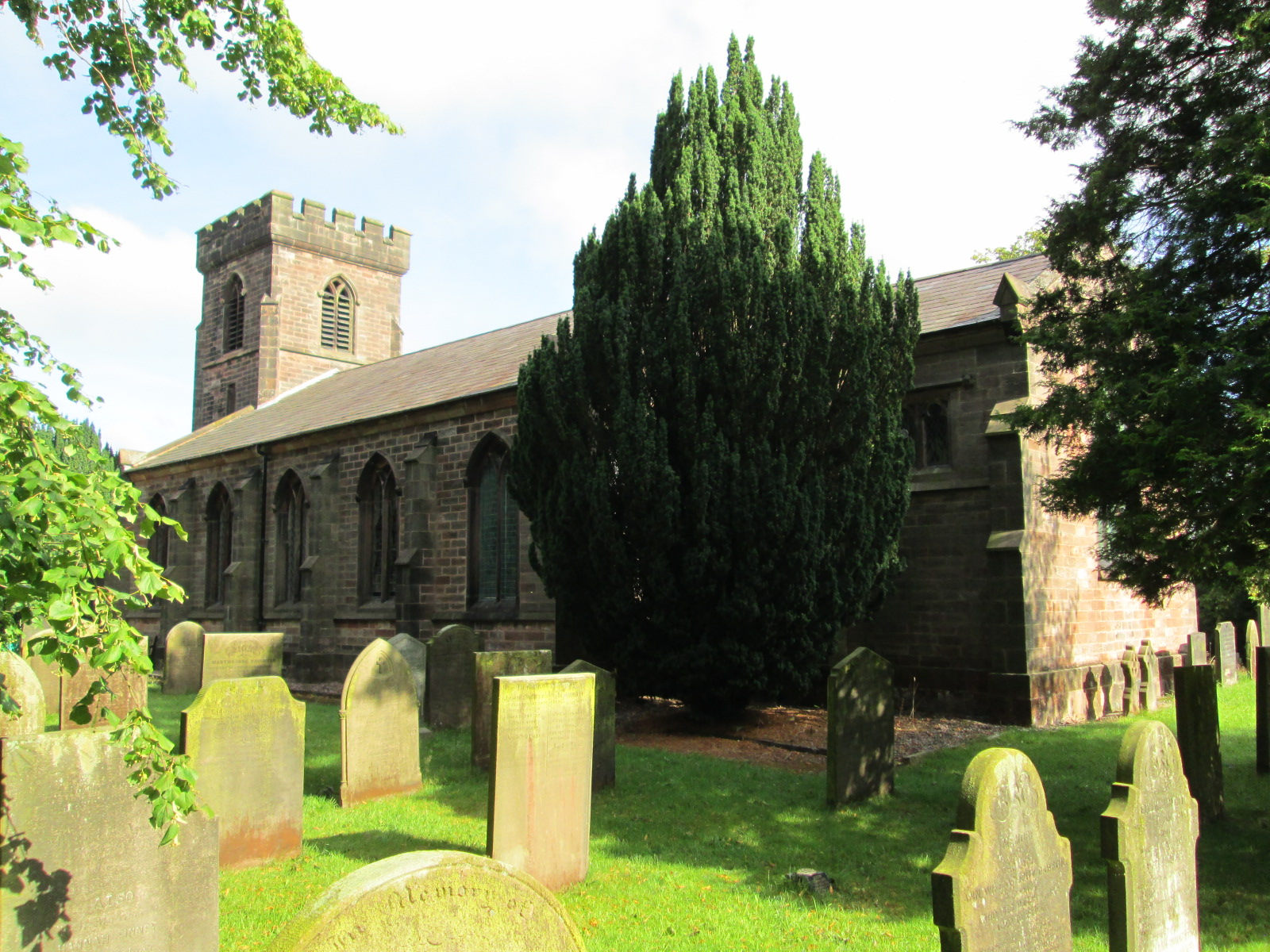
St John's Church

The Anglican Church of St John the Baptist was built in 1833–34; the architect was James Trubshaw. It was built of locally quarried stone and has a slate roof; it has a west tower with a crenellated parapet. In 1901 the chancel was extended by J. Beardmore, making room for choir stalls. The church is a Grade II listed building.

In 2009 the Parish of Wetley Rocks became a joint benefice with the Parish of St Philip's, Werrington.

St John's Church of England Primary School is adjacent to the church.

There is also a Methodist Church in the village.

== See also ==
- Listed buildings in Cheddleton
