= Leeds North =

Leeds North may refer to:

- The northern area of the city of Leeds, West Yorkshire, England
- Leeds North (UK Parliament constituency) (1885–1955)
