= Dorothea Townshend =

British novelist and biographer

- Born: 1852; Hilderstone
- Died: November 30, 1930
- Occupations: Novelist, biographer, poet
- Spouse: Richard Baxter Townshend

Dorothea Townshend (1852 – November 30, 1930) was a British novelist, biographer, children's author, and poet.

She was born Letitia Jane Dorothea Baker in 1852 in Hilderstone, Staffordshire. She was the daughter of the Reverend Ralph Bourne Baker of Hasfield Court and Frances Crofton Singer, daughter of Joseph Henderson Singer, Bishop of Meath. In 1881, she married Richard Baxter Townshend of Castle Townshend, officer in the Madras Native Infantry and author.

She wrote several works of historical fiction set in England and Ireland: The Strange Adventures of a Young Lady of Quality (1893), The Faery of Lisbawn and Dennis Roe's Tower (1900), A Lost Leader: A Tale of Restoration Days (1902), and A Saint George of King Charles's Day (1906). She wrote children's fiction, such as The Children of Nugentstown and their dealings with the Sidhe (1911), about three children who meet fairies, and biographies of Endymion Porter, Richard Boyle, 1st Earl of Cork, and George Digby, 2nd Earl of Bristol. She also published a book of poetry, Broken Lights (1932).

Dorothea Townshend died on November 30, 1930.

== Bibliography ==
- (with Richard Baxter Townshend) An Officer of the Long Parliament and His Descendants London: Frowde, 1892.
- The Strange Adventures of a Young Lady of Quality. London: Digby, Long & Co., 1893.
- Life and Letters of Mr. Endymion Porter London: Unwin, 1897.
- Captain Chimney-Sweep: A Story of the Great War. 1 vol. Edinburgh: Nelson and Sons, 1900.
- The Faery of Lisbawn and Dennis Roe's Tower. London: Thomas Nelson & Sons, 1900.
- Ivy and Oak, and Other Stories for Girls. 1 vol. Edinburgh: Nelson and Sons, 1901.
- A Lost Leader: A Tale of Restoration Days. London: Society for Promoting Christian Knowledge; New York: E. & J.B. Young & Co., 1902.
- Life and Letters of the Great Earl of Cork London: Duckworth, 1904.
- The Bride of a Day. G. Allen, 1905.
- A Saint George of King Charles's Day. A story. London: Christian Knowledge Society, 1906.
- The Children of Nugentstown and their dealings with the Sidhe. London: David Nutt, 1911.
- A Lion, a Mouse, and a Motor-Car. Simpkin, 1914.
- Whither. SPCK, 1918.
- Life of George Digby, Second Earl of Bristol. London: Unwin, 1924.
- Broken Lights London, 1932.
