= Sam Crowther Moore =

British socialist activist

- Born: 1870; England
- Died: 1926 (aged 55–56)
- Occupation: socialist activist
- Known for: active in the Independent Labour Party and the Workers' Educational Association

Sam Crowther Moore (1870–1926) was a British socialist activist.

Moore lived in Mytholmroyd in Yorkshire, and worked as a commercial traveller. For many years, he was a supporter of the Liberal Party, and at the 1906 United Kingdom general election, he backed John Sharp Higham, the successful Liberal candidate for Sowerby. The following year, he joined the Fabian Society, and in 1908, he became the first president of the Sowerby Labour Representation Association. This aimed to stand candidates from the labour movement, separately from the Liberals, and it backed Moore as its candidate in the January 1910 United Kingdom general election, although he did not ultimately stand.

Moore became active in the Independent Labour Party, and the Workers' Educational Association. At the 1924 United Kingdom general election, he stood unsuccessfully for the Labour Party in Leeds North.
