= 1902 Leeds North by-election =

By-election

The 1902 Leeds North by-election was a parliamentary by-election held for the British House of Commons constituency of Leeds North in the West Riding of Yorkshire on 29 July 1902.

== Vacancy ==
The by-election was caused by the elevation to the peerage of the sitting Conservative MP William Jackson. Jackson had held the seat since its creation for the general election of 1885, having previously been one of the MPs for the multi-member seat of Leeds.

== Candidates ==
It was reported that both the Conservative and Liberal parties in Leeds were unprepared for a by-election, suggesting that Jackson’s peerage had come as a surprise to the party organisations if not to Jackson himself.

=== Conservatives ===
The Conservatives considered a number of possible candidates including Colonel Thomas Walter Harding, a Liberal Unionist who had contested West Leeds against Herbert Gladstone and was a former Lord Mayor of Leeds; F. Stanley Jackson, the son of the retiring MP and a Yorkshire County cricketer; and Reginald Wigram and Sir Arthur Lawson, who were both officers of the party in Leeds. They eventually selected Lawson, a 58-year-old businessman who was President of the Leeds Conservative Association.

=== Liberals ===
North Leeds Liberal Association, who decided they wanted a strong local candidate, adopted Rowland Barran as their candidate in early July 1902. Other possible candidates mentioned in the press were G. J. Cockburn, chairman of the North Leeds Liberal Association and the Leeds School Board, and W. Beckworth, but there was no real contest. Barran was aged 44, and prominent in a firm of local clothing manufacturers and merchants. He was the son of Sir John Barran a former MP for Leeds and for the nearby seat of Otley. Rowland Barran was a member of Leeds City Council and a former member of the Leeds School Board.

=== Labour ===
The Independent Labour Party in Leeds announced that they would definitely be standing a candidate in the by-election. They were considering Philip Snowden who later became a Labour MP and Chancellor of the Exchequer and two other local men as candidates, as well as T. B. Duncan, Secretary of the Shop Assistants Association. The party was reportedly not particularly strong in the division, with few members and in need of financial support from party headquarters. Keir Hardie visited Leeds with other top Labour and Trade union officials in early July 1902 to discuss the by-election. However, lack of resources eventually forced Labour not to bring forward a candidate. They had another by-election to fight in Clitheroe in Lancashire which was a better prospect and at a meeting of the ILP in Leeds on 4 July, Hardie told members that the fight in North Leeds would have to wait for a future election. Ironically the Labour position in the Clitheroe seat was so strong that both the Liberal and Conservatives chose not to contest it and the Labour candidate David Shackleton was returned unopposed.

== Issues ==
=== Education ===
Education dominated the campaign. A number of historians have commented that the Liberal candidate fought the by-election exclusively or predominantly on the issue. As a former member of Leeds School Board, Barran took a strong interest in education. There was a robust debate going on around the government’s plans for an Education Bill to replace school boards with local education authorities and Liberals were highly exercised by the proposals to bring church schools into the public system. Many Liberals were strongly nonconformist and the idea that Church of England and Roman Catholic schools should be funded from the rates, a form of local taxation, was anathema to them. It provided the battle slogan ‘Rome on the Rates’ and united the party against the government. Barran, a Baptist by religion, spoke out strongly against these plans at his first public meeting on 8 July 1902, saying the proposed Bill was biased towards the Anglican Church and what he described as ‘the clerical party’. The Bill was designed to endow the clerical party, to hand over management of schools to the churches rather than the people through elected school boards and was, he claimed, a deliberate attack on the Free Churches. Barran also held three further meetings specifically featuring the Education Bill issue. It was reported that Roman Catholics in the constituency put their support behind the Conservative candidate Sir Arthur Lawson.

=== Other issues ===
Other topical questions raised by the candidates included Irish Home Rule and Free Trade versus Tariff Reform. Temperance was also an issue supported by Barran while Lawson had the support of the electoral committee of the Amalgamated Licensing Trades. From the Liberal side there was an attack on the government for its inaction on social and economic questions, presumably against the background of the increasing importance being given to these issues by the emerging New Liberalism.

The Conservatives seem to have spent the election in defence of the government but clearly took the attack to the Liberals on supposed internal dissensions in the Liberal Party, around the roles of Sir Henry Campbell-Bannerman and Lord Rosebery. Rosebery the former prime minister had become increasingly out of step with the mainstream of Liberal MPs on social reform and the role of the Empire. There were rival camps inside the party with the setting up of the Liberal Imperial Council in 1901 and the Liberal League in 1902. There were fears that this would formally split the party along the lines of the defection in 1886 of the Liberal Unionists with speculation that the Liberal League was a putative breakaway movement rather than simply a faction within the party arguing for a particular approach to government. The issue was heightened because of the Boer War but the Liberal approach during the by-election was to praise the troops and the generals while attacking the government for underestimating the numbers of troops needed and for resisting necessary reforms to the Army.

== Result ==
The result was a Liberal gain from the government, with Barran turning a Tory majority of 2,517 at the 1900 general election into a Liberal majority of 758.

Rowland Barran

Leeds North by-election, 1902
Party	Candidate	Votes	%	±%
Liberal	Rowland Barran	7,539	52.6	+12.7
Conservative	Sir Arthur Lawson, 1st Baronet	6,781	47.4	−12.7
Majority		758	5.2	N/A
Turnout		14,320	75.0	+3.1
Liberal gain from Conservative		Swing	+12.7	

There was a great upsurge of hope among Liberals that the result would send a message to the government on their plans for education reform but these were not maintained and the Bill passed later that year.

The result also indicated a change in the demography of the North Leeds area which the education issue highlighted. Dissenting churches and opinion were gaining prominence. One historian of Leeds has written that while dissent was always strong in the city, it was becoming more confident and less deferential as the middle class element in the chapels grew with the economy. Barran went on to hold the seat until the 1918 general election when he stood down from Parliament.

== See also ==
- List of United Kingdom by-elections
- United Kingdom by-election records
