= Ashcombe Park, Staffordshire =

Country house in Cheddleton, Staffordshire, England

Ashcombe Park
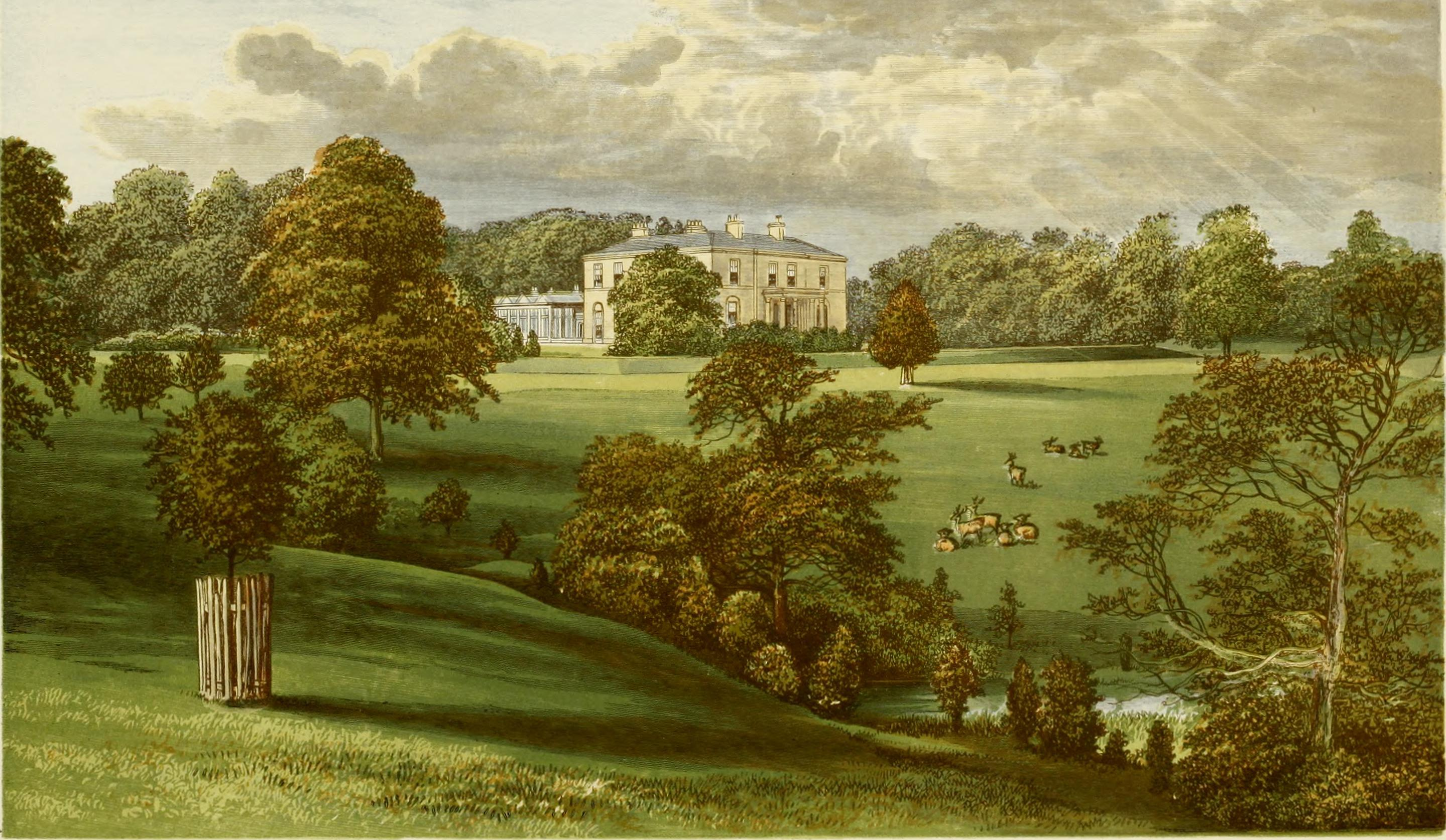
- Ashcombe Park: from a publication of 1840
- Interactive map of the Ashcombe Park area

General information
- Status: Grade II* listed
- Location: Near Cheddleton, Staffordshire grid reference SJ 974 512, United Kingdom
- Coordinates: 53°3′30″N 2°2′26″W
- Completed: 1811

Design and construction
- Architect: James Trubshaw

Ashcombe Park is a country house and estate near Cheddleton, in Staffordshire, England.

The house is a Grade II* listed building, listed on 2 May 1953.

== History and description ==
Ashcombe Park House was built from 1807 to 1811 for William Sneyd, after his marriage to Jane Debank. The architect and builder was James Trubshaw. The parkland around the house was designed at about this time; the fishponds date from the 1860s. The property was late owned by Dryden Sneyd, and remained in the Sneyd family until 1936.

The house is faced with sandstone ashlar, and has a Tuscan porte-cochère, said to have been moved from another Sneyd house, Belmont Hall in Cheadle. There is a walled garden, and the parkland is surrounded by a stone wall.

=== Botham Hall ===
On the site today occupied by Ashcombe Park House, once stood a 16th-century residence, Botham Hall, that was surrounded by a deer park. It was an "Elizabethan stone mansion with many gables and mullioned windows of no mean character".

Botham Hall and Mossley Hall, the principal residences in Cheddleton, were the seats of the Hollins family, which were connected through marriage. Botham's owner, William Joliffe, was the brother of Margaret Joliffe, who married John Hollins of Mossley Hall. In the early 17th century, it was the home of William Joliffe, whose family held the Moiety of the lordship of Cheddleton. The hall remained part of the Joliffe family's property until it was sold under the provisions of Thomas Joliffe's will in 1765. In the late 18th century it was owned by the Debank family, before it was torn down in 1806 and replaced by Ashcombe Park.

== See also ==
- Listed buildings in Cheddleton
- The Ashes, Endon
