= Rowland Barran =

British politician (1858–1949)

- Barran in 1902

Member of Parliament for Leeds North
- In office 29 July 1902 – 14 December 1918

Personal details
- Born: 7 August 1858
- Died: 6 August 1949 (aged 90)
- Party: Liberal
- Spouse: Rose Cardew Bradley

Sir Rowland Barran

Sir Rowland Hirst Barran (7 August 1858 – 6 August 1949) was a British Liberal MP for Leeds North.

== Biography ==
Rowland Barran was born in 1858, the youngest son of Sir John Barran (a pioneer in clothing manufacture and Member of Parliament for Leeds and Otley).

Barran also had strong ties with the Lupton family, who were prominent members of various reform movements during the 19th century. Following the death of Frances Lupton in 1892, Rowland lived at the Lupton-owned Beechwood Estate, which had been entailed to her eldest son, Francis Martineau Lupton (a fellow Liberal MP). Barran remained at Beechwood until World War I. The Lupton family also owned Newton Park Estate, located in Barran's constituency of Leeds North.

Barran bred Shorthorn livestock during his residency at Beechwood.

Barran became chairman of the family firm in 1918, succeeding his brother, Charles.

He was a member of the Leeds City Council alongside Alderman Francis Martineau Lupton, and served on the Leeds School Board before his election to parliament.

== Political career ==
He was elected to the Parliament for Leeds North in a by-election on 29 July 1902 (caused by the elevation of William Jackson to the peerage), and served until the General Election of 14 December 1918. He was knighted in 1917.

During World War I, Barran indicated he would stand down at the next election, probably to concentrate more on his business interests. In 1918, he became chairman of the family firm of clothing manufacturers, taking over that position from his brother.

== Family ==
Barran married Rose Cardew Bradley. They had the following children:

- Rose Sylvia Barran
- Gwendoline Cardew Barran
- Captain Rowland Noel Barran (25 December 1887 – died 19 March 1919) married Auriol Camilla Sharlia Blanche Hay(granddaughter of George Hay-Drummond, 12th Earl of Kinnoull)
- Captain Hugh Bradley Barran (13 May 1889 – 19 May 1975)

Parliament of the United Kingdom
Preceded by William Jackson	Member of Parliament for Leeds North; 1902 – 1918	Succeeded by Alexander Farquharson
