= Leeds North (constituency) =

Parliamentary constituency in the United Kingdom, 1885–1955

- Former borough constituency for the House of Commons
- County: West Riding of Yorkshire (now West Yorkshire)

1885–1955
- Seats: One
- Created from: Leeds
- Replaced by: Leeds North East

Leeds North was a borough constituency in the city of Leeds, West Yorkshire, which returned one Member of Parliament (MP) to the House of Commons of the Parliament of the United Kingdom, elected by the first past the post voting system.

== Boundaries ==
1885–1918: The Municipal Borough of Leeds wards of Headingley and North West, and parts of the wards of Brunswick, North, and North East.

1918–1950: Parts of the County Borough of Leeds wards of Brunswick, Headingley, North, and North West.

1950–1951: The County Borough of Leeds wards of North, Roundhay, and Woodhouse.

1951–1955: The County Borough of Leeds wards of Allerton, Moortown, Roundhay, and Woodhouse.

== History ==
The constituency was created in 1885 by the Redistribution of Seats Act 1885, and was first used in the general election of that year. Leeds had previously been represented by two MPs (1832–1868) and three MPs (1868–1885). From 1885 it was represented by five single-member constituencies: Leeds Central, Leeds East, Leeds North, Leeds South and Leeds West. The constituencies of Morley, Otley and Pudsey were also created in 1885.

The constituency was abolished in 1955. After the 1955 general election Leeds was represented by Leeds East (created 1885, abolished 1918, recreated 1955), Leeds North East (created 1918), Leeds North West (created 1950), Leeds South, and Leeds South East (created 1918). There were also constituencies of Batley and Morley (created 1918) and Pudsey (created 1885, replaced by Pudsey and Otley 1918–1950).

== Members of Parliament ==
Year	Member	Party
1885	William Jackson	Conservative
1902	Rowland Barran	Liberal
1918	Alexander Farquharson	Coalition Liberal
1922	Alexander Farquharson	National Liberal
1922	Hugh Butler	Unionist
1923	Sir Gervase Beckett	Unionist
1929	Osbert Peake	Unionist
1955	constituency abolished	

== Elections ==
=== Elections in the 1880s ===
General election 1885: Leeds North
Party	Candidate	Votes	%
Conservative	William Jackson	4,494	51.5
Liberal	Arthur Rucker	4,237	48.5
Majority		257	3.0
Turnout		8,731	86.2
Registered electors		10,128	
Conservative win (new seat)			

General election 1886: Leeds North
Party	Candidate	Votes	%	±%
Conservative	William Jackson	4,301	53.9	+2.4
Liberal	Albert Osliff Rutson	3,682	46.1	−2.4
Majority		619	7.8	+4.8
Turnout		7,983	78.8	−7.4
Registered electors		10,128		
Conservative hold		Swing	+2.4	

=== Elections in the 1890s ===
1891 Leeds North by-election
Party	Candidate	Votes	%	±%
Conservative	William Jackson	Unopposed		
Conservative hold				

- Caused by Jackson's appointment as Chief Secretary to the Lord Lieutenant of Ireland

Thomas Leuty

General election 1892: Leeds North
Party	Candidate	Votes	%	±%
Conservative	William Jackson	5,790	54.8	N/A
Liberal	Thomas Leuty	4,776	45.2	New
Majority		1,014	9.6	N/A
Turnout		10,566	85.9	N/A
Registered electors		12,294		
Conservative hold		Swing	N/A	

General election 1895: Leeds North
Party	Candidate	Votes	%	±%
Conservative	William Jackson	5,992	57.2	+2.4
Liberal	Herbert Stanhope Baines	4,484	42.8	−2.4
Majority		1,508	14.4	+4.8
Turnout		10,476	77.2	−8.7
Registered electors		13,563		
Conservative hold		Swing	+2.4	

=== Elections in the 1900s ===
General election 1900: Leeds North
Party	Candidate	Votes	%	±%
Conservative	William Jackson	7,512	60.1	+2.9
Liberal	James Cullen Hamilton	4,995	39.9	−2.9
Majority		2,517	20.2	+5.8
Turnout		12,507	71.9	−5.3
Registered electors		17,387		
Conservative hold		Swing	+2.9	

Rowland Barran

1902 Leeds North by-election
Party	Candidate	Votes	%	±%
Liberal	Rowland Barran	7,539	52.6	+12.7
Conservative	Arthur Tredgold Lawson	6,781	47.4	−12.7
Majority		758	5.2	N/A
Turnout		14,320	75.0	+3.1
Registered electors		19,094		
Liberal gain from Conservative		Swing	+12.7	

General election 1906: Leeds North
Party	Candidate	Votes	%	±%
Liberal	Rowland Barran	9,593	57.4	+17.5
Conservative	John Birchall	7,109	42.6	−17.5
Majority		2,484	14.8	N/A
Turnout		16,702	78.8	+6.9
Registered electors		21,196		
Liberal gain from Conservative		Swing	+17.5	

=== Elections in the 1910s ===
General election January 1910: Leeds North
Party	Candidate	Votes	%	±%
Liberal	Rowland Barran	10,775	54.0	−3.4
Conservative	John Birchall	9,164	46.0	+3.4
Majority		1,611	8.0	−6.8
Turnout		19,939	86.8	+8.0
Liberal hold		Swing		

Rowland Barran

General election December 1910: Leeds North
Party	Candidate	Votes	%	±%
Liberal	Rowland Barran	9,324	50.7	−3.3
Conservative	John Birchall	9,056	49.3	+3.3
Majority		268	1.4	−6.6
Turnout		18,380	80.0	−6.8
Liberal hold		Swing	-3.3	

General Election 1914–15

Another General Election was required to take place before the end of 1915. The political parties had been making preparations for an election to take place and by July 1914, the following candidates had been selected;

- Liberal: Rowland Barran
- Unionist: John Birchall

A.C. Farquharson

General election 1918: Leeds North
Party		Candidate	Votes	%
C	National Liberal	Alexander Farquharson	13,863	74.7
	Labour	George Hartley Thompson	3,423	18.4
	National	Harold Frazer Wyatt	1,282	6.9
Majority			10,440	56.3
Turnout			18,568	49.0
Registered electors			37,904	
	National Liberal win (new boundaries)			
C indicates candidate endorsed by the coalition government.

=== Elections in the 1920s ===
General election 1922: Leeds North
Party	Candidate	Votes	%	±%
Unionist	Hugh Butler	13,771	51.4	+44.5
Liberal	Edwin Oldroyd Dodgson	7,230	26.9	−47.8
Labour	David Stewart	5,836	21.7	+3.3
Majority		6,541	24.5	N/A
Turnout		26,837	71.8	+22.8
Registered electors		37,383		
Unionist gain from National Liberal		Swing		

General election 1923: Leeds North
Party	Candidate	Votes	%	±%
Unionist	Gervase Beckett	14,066	54.0	+2.6
Liberal	Edwin Oldroyd Dodgson	6,624	25.4	−1.5
Labour	David Stewart	5,384	20.6	−1.1
Majority		7,442	28.6	+4.1
Turnout		26,074	67.1	−4.7
Registered electors		38,873		
Unionist hold		Swing	+2.1	

General election 1924: Leeds North
Party	Candidate	Votes	%	±%
Unionist	Gervase Beckett	18,502	70.0	+16.0
Labour	Sam Crowther Moore	7,920	30.0	+9.4
Majority		10,582	40.0	+11.4
Turnout		26,422	67.1	0.0
Registered electors		39,373		
Unionist hold		Swing	+3.3	

General election 1929: Leeds North
Party	Candidate	Votes	%	±%
Unionist	Osbert Peake	19,661	48.2	−21.8
Labour	Thomas McCall	11,180	27.4	−2.6
Liberal	Edmund Harvey	9,944	24.4	New
Majority		8,481	20.8	−19.2
Turnout		40,785	73.6	+6.5
Registered electors		55,429		
Unionist hold		Swing	−9.6	

=== Elections in the 1930s ===
General election 1931: Leeds North
Party	Candidate	Votes	%	±%
Conservative	Osbert Peake	34,964	78.8	+30.6
Labour	L John Edwards	9,427	21.2	−6.2
Majority		25,537	57.6	+36.8
Turnout		44,391	74.0	+0.4
Conservative hold		Swing		

General election 1935: Leeds North
Party	Candidate	Votes	%	±%
Conservative	Osbert Peake	30,636	69.0	−9.8
Labour	L John Edwards	13,792	31.0	+9.8
Majority		16,844	38.0	−19.6
Turnout		44,428	66.8	−7.2
Conservative hold		Swing		

General Election 1939–40:

Another General Election was required to take place before the end of 1940. The political parties had been making preparations for an election to take place and by the Autumn of 1939, the following candidates had been selected;

- Conservative: Osbert Peake
- Labour: Ronald Hodgson
- Liberal: Howard B Tanner

=== Elections in the 1940s ===
General election 1945: Leeds North
Party	Candidate	Votes	%	±%
Conservative	Osbert Peake	22,848	42.0	−27.0
Labour	Ronald Hodgson	22,720	41.8	+10.8
Liberal	John Hutchison MacCallum Scott	8,824	16.2	New
Majority		128	0.2	−37.8
Turnout		54,392	72.0	+5.2
Conservative hold		Swing		

=== Elections in the 1950s ===
General election 1950: Leeds North
Party	Candidate	Votes	%
Conservative	Osbert Peake	27,766	58.8
Labour	Robert J Hurst	15,018	31.8
Liberal	Winifred Underhill	4,446	9.4
Majority		12,748	27.0
Turnout		47,230	84.2
Conservative win (new boundaries)			

General election 1951: Leeds North
Party	Candidate	Votes	%	±%
Conservative	Osbert Peake	30,290	63.7	+4.9
Labour	Philip Taylor	17,249	36.3	+4.5
Majority		13,041	27.4	+0.4
Turnout		47,539	81.7	−2.5
Conservative hold		Swing		
