= Cheddleton Flint Mill =

Watermill in Staffordshire, England

Coordinates: 53°4′15″N 2°2′34″W

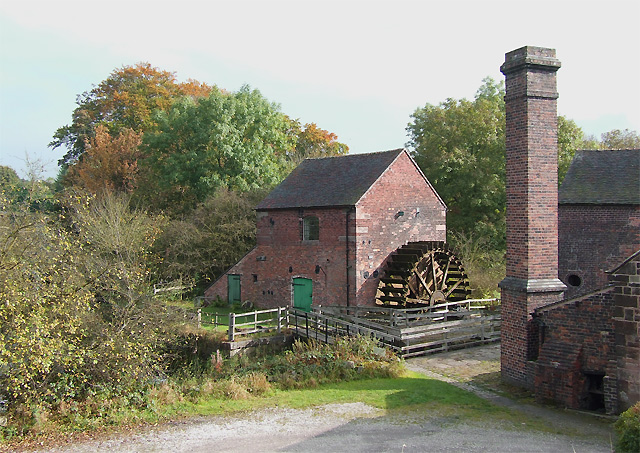
Cheddleton Flint Mill

Cheddleton Flint Mill is a water mill situated in the village of Cheddleton in the English county of Staffordshire. The mill race takes water from the river Churnet. The site is believed to have been used for milling since the Middle Ages. However, the present structures mainly date from the period of the Industrial Revolution, although there is evidence of some earlier work surviving.

There are actually two mills: one is a late 18th-century structure which was purpose-built to grind flint for use in the pottery industry, and the other was converted to the same purpose from use as a corn-mill. The mill complex includes a miller's cottage, two flint kilns, a drying kiln and outbuildings, and is adjacent to the Caldon Canal.

== Conservation ==
The complex was listed grade II* in 1986 (the buildings being separately listed). It is now maintained and operated by the Cheddleton Flint Mill Industrial Heritage Trust, a registered charity under English law.

== See also ==
- Listed buildings in Cheddleton
- Moddershall
- Etruria Industrial Museum
