= Hilderstone =

Village in Staffordshire, England

Coordinates: 52.90925°N 2.07774°W

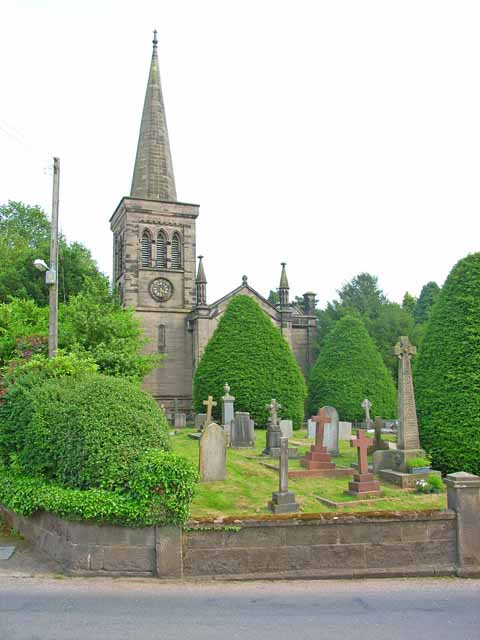
- The Parish Church of Christ Church

- Location within Staffordshire
- Population: 641
  - London: 150 miles
- District: Stafford
- Shire county: Staffordshire
- Region: West Midlands
- Country: England
- Sovereign state: United Kingdom
- Post town: Stone
- Postcode district: ST15
- Dialling code: 01889
- Police: Staffordshire
- Fire: Staffordshire
- Ambulance: West Midlands
- UK Parliament: Stone, Great Wyrley and Penkridge

Hilderstone is a village and a civil parish in the English county of Staffordshire.

== Location ==
The village is 8.6 miles (13.8 km) north of the town of Stafford, and 9.8 miles (15.8 km) south east of Stoke-on-Trent. The nearest railway station is 5.3 miles (8.5 km) west in the town of Stone. The village is situate on the B 5066. The nearest main roads are the A520 which passes the village 3.8 miles (6.1 km) to the west.

== Population ==
The 2011 census recorded a population of 641 in 235 Households. The parish comes under the Stafford Non-Metropolitan District.

== History ==
=== Etymology ===
The genesis of the village name are said to be of Saxon origin. The name Heldulvestone and its variant are of Saxon derivation. The origin of Hilderstone is Hildewulf's ton meaning a warrior wolf and ton a place or town. Thus Hilderstone was the place of the warrior wolf.

=== Domesday Book ===
Hilderstone is recorded in the Domesday Book of 1086. In the survey the village has the name Heldulvestone In the survey the settlement was described as quite small with only 6 households. Other Assets included 2 villager or villein, meadow of 1 acres, 2 smallholders and 2 slave. There was also 3 ploughlands (land for), 1 lord's plough teams, 1 men's plough teams. In 1066 the lord of the manor was held by Wulfric Dunning. In 1086 the lord of the manor was held by Vitalis of Hilderstone. The Tenant-in-chief in 1086 was Robert of Stafford.

== Buildings and structures ==
There are 15 listed buildings and structures within the parish. This includes a K6 Telephone Box designed in 1935 by Sir Giles Gilbert Scott. All of these structures have been designated a Grade II listing.

=== Listed buildings in Hilderstone ===
- Barn to east of Hall Farmhouse
- Christ Church, Hilderstone.
- Church Farmhouse
- Churchyard wall, gate piers and gates
- The Shop and Copes Cottage
- Hall Farm Cottages
- Hilderstone Hall
- Hilderstone House
- Horseshoe Farmhouse and Cottages
- Telephone kiosk on Hilderstone main road
- Lower Farmhouseref
- Mill Farmhouse and Mill Cottage
- Stones Throw
- The Smithy and School House
- The Stores
- Yew Tree House

=== The parish church of Christ Church ===
The Grade II listed parish church of Christ Church began construction in 1829 with the laying of a foundation stone. The church was designed by Thomas Trubshaw (1802–42) and was built using a local stone called Hollington stone. Trubshaw was a son of James Trubshaw, the head of a Staffordshire family of masons and church builders who had been involved in church building for many years. This church was designed and built in the gothic style. The structure is 72.0 feet (21.9 m) in length and has a central aisle and two side aisles. The church is 32.0 feet (9.8 m) at its widest. There is 40.0 feet (12.2 m) tall tower with a recessed spire at the north west with a single bell. Around the outside eaves of the church there are carved gargoyles which are said to depict the workmen involved in the building of the church. The church was completed in 1833 and opened on 31 July of that year.

=== Moated site ===
The site of a moat lies 200 metres (660 ft) south-west of Hilderstone Hall. It relates to a former house for which records go back to the 13th century, predating the hall which was built in 1730. The dry moat, dimensions about 100 metres (330 ft) square, is about 12 metres (39 ft) wide and up to 4 metres (13 ft) deep. A fishpond, associated with the moated house, is immediately south-east. They are a scheduled monument.

== Notable people ==
- Richard Gerard of Hilderstone (1635-1680) a victim of the Popish Plot of the reign of Charles II. He was a Roman Catholic and came forward as a witness in the defence of the accused Catholic aristocrat, William Howard, 1st Viscount Stafford, which led to his own death in prison, although he had never been brought to trial.
