= Etruria Industrial Museum =

Museum in Etruria, Staffordshire, England

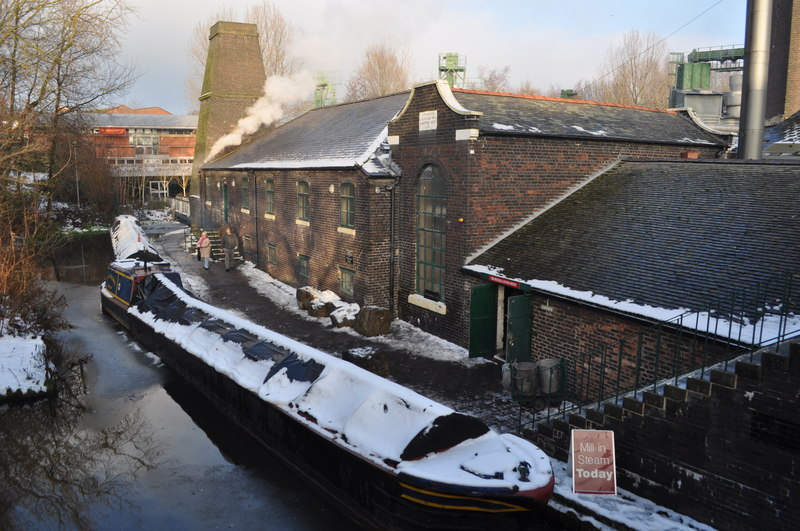

- Location within Staffordshire
- Established: 1991; 35 years ago
- Location: Lower Bedford Street; Etruria, Staffordshire, England
- Coordinates: 53°01′09″N 2°11′31″W
- Type: Industry
- Website: Official website

The Etruria Industrial Museum is located in Etruria, Staffordshire, in England. The museum is a typical and well-preserved example of a nineteenth century British steam-powered potter's mill. It is situated between the Trent and Mersey Canal and the Etruria staircase locks of the Caldon Canal. The museum has a modern entrance building, leading into a Grade II* listed building which was formerly the Etruscan bone and flint mill. The mill is also a scheduled monument.

== History ==
The bone and flint mill was built in 1857 to grind materials for the local pottery industry. It was operated as a family business until 1975. The location of such a facility next to a canal is not unusual; the Cheddleton Flint Mill on the Caldon Canal is another example.

== Restoration ==
The site was given an official heritage listing in the 1970s (initially as an ancient monument). After a period of restoration, started in 1978, the museum was opened by Fred Dibnah in 1991. Inside the restored site visitors see displays on the history of the mill and its site, and its machinery. There is a working steam engine called "Princess" dating from the 1820s, which was second-hand at the time the mill was built. There is a working historic blacksmith's forge flanking the museum's modern entrance building. Much further restoration work was completed on the wider landscape setting of the mill in the mid-1980s, as part of the preparations for the national Stoke-on-Trent Garden Festival.

== Current status ==
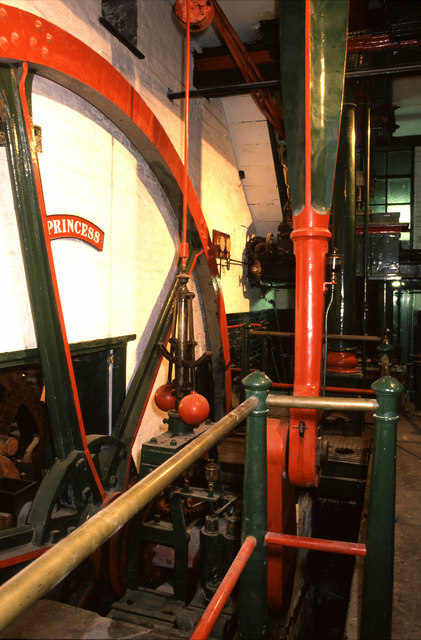
Princess, the mill's beam engine

At 2015 the museum is operated by volunteers through Shirley's Bone and Flint Mill Volunteer group, although it is part of Stoke-on-Trent City Council’s Museum Service, and as such it is open to the public only occasionally throughout the year. The museum website advertises the days when the 1903 coal-fired boiler provides steam to operate "Princess", which then turns the grinding machinery.

As of September 2015 the mill was purchased from St Modwen by the members of Shirley's Bone and Flint Mill Volunteers CIO and will continue to be leased to Stoke-on-Trent City Council as the heart of the Etruria Industrial Museum.

== Immediate setting ==
The Trent and Mersey Canal´s course through the city is a linear Conservation Area. Along with the Middleport section of the canal, the Etruria section is particularly important in terms of urban heritage, and the Mill site is immediately abutted by several other important historic sites:

- the staircase locks of the Caldon Canal (up which thousands of narrowboating holiday makers labour each year in order to visit the Moorlands town of Leek)
- a wide grassy glade surrounded by a circle of trees, marking the site of the British Gas Light Company gas-holder – the first to supply heat and light to the city
- the site of the Old Dispensary and House of Recovery, which was the city's first hospital.

Access to vehicles is partly restricted due to weight restrictions on the canal bridges, and there is no through-traffic, making the large park-like area centred on the mill an attractive one for the residents of an increasingly gentrified Etruria. The Etruria Canals Festival generally takes place annually at and around the Etruria Industrial Museum on the first weekend in June, although in some years the large outdoor market of stalls is not staged by the committee.

== See also ==
- Cheddleton Flint Mill
