= Richard Gerard of Hilderstone =

English landowner

Richard Gerard of Hilderstone, Staffordshire (born about 1635; died 11 March 1680 (O.S.)) was a victim of the Popish Plot of the reign of Charles II of England. He was a Roman Catholic recusant landowner in Staffordshire, and came forward as a witness in the defence of the accused Catholic aristocrat, William Howard, 1st Viscount Stafford, which led to his own death in prison, although he had never been brought to trial.

== Life ==
Gerard was friendly with Jesuit missionaries in England, and had three sons at their college of St-Omer. He was a trustee for them for some small properties.

He attended a gathering on the feast of the Assumption, 1678, when Father John Gavan made his profession as a member of the Society of Jesus, at the house of the Penderels at Boscobel. This was the family who had sheltered Charles II after the battle of Worcester; and after dinner, the party visited the Royal Oak, the tree in which Charles had hidden.

This circumstance came to the knowledge of the notorious Plot informer Stephen Dugdale, and became the occasion of Richard's imprisonment and death. Dugdale accused him of having contributed to the funds of the alleged plotters (perhaps with some reference to the pensions paid for his boys at St-Omer) and of having conspired to murder the King. Dugdale's principal target was not Gerard himself but Lord Stafford, who was executed for treason in December 1680, largely on Dugdale's evidence.

Gerard would have been a crucial alibi witness and his death seriously undermined Stafford's defence (which Stafford, like all those accused of treason before 1695, was obliged to conduct himself, without benefit of legal counsel).

Examined by the Lords' committee (19 May 1679) he confessed to the meeting at Boscobel, and was thrown into Newgate Jail. There he was kept for ten months without trial, before falling ill of gaol fever and dying.

He was attended during his last hours by Father Edward Petre, who, in a letter written 29 March 1680, speaks of his dying wish to be buried by the side of his recently executed friend, Thomas Whitbread.

== Family ==
He was the son of John Gerard of Hilderstne, Staffordshire and grandson of Sir Gilbert Gerard.

The Gerards Bromley branch of the Gerard family, which divided off from the original stock of Bryn, Lancashire in the fourteenth century, grew to power and affluence through his grandfather Sir Gilbert Gerard, who was Attorney General to Elizabeth I of England 1559–1581. He is said to have obtained the estate of Gerard's Bromley, through a court intrigue, from the Catholic Sir Thomas Gerard of Bryn (father of the Jesuit John Gerard), as the price for which the knight bought off the prosecution against him for adhering to Mary, Queen of Scots. In 1603 Gilbert's son Thomas Gerard, uncle of Richard, was made Baron Gerard of Gerard's Bromley, County Stafford.

Richard's third son, Philip Gerard (born 1 December 1665), having entered the Society of Jesus on 7 September 1684, unexpectedly became the seventh and last Baron Gerard of Gerard's Bromley (12 April 1707, O.S.), following the deaths of various cousins and older brothers. Philip never claimed the title, and gave up all rights to the estates for a small yearly pension of £60, being obliged to leave the country by the action of a near connection, the Duke of Hamilton, who advertised the reward of £1,000 for his arrest as a priest. (The four lords who have been among the English Jesuits all lived at the same time. Philip Gerard (d. 1733) was the contemporary of Father Gilbert Talbot (d. 1743), who became Earl of Shrewsbury in 1717; also of Father William Molyneux (d. 1754), who was Viscount Sefton in 1745; also of Father Charles Dormer (d. 1761), who was Baron Dormer in 1728.)
