= Hugh Butler (MP) =

Hugh Myddleton Butler, JP (3 May 1857 – 10 October 1943) was Conservative MP for Leeds North (UK Parliament constituency).

An ironmaster and engineer, he was a partner in the Kirkstall Forge with his two brothers since 1875. A supporter of church day schools in Leeds, he was chairman of the North Leeds Conservative Association since 1902. He was elected for Leeds North in 1922, but stood down at the 1923 general election.

== Family ==
Butler's daughter Gabrielle Helen Holgate Butler married the consultant spa physician Wilfrid Edgecombe, who was instrumental in founding Harrogate District Hospital.

== Sources ==
- "Obituary". The Times. 12 October 1943. p. 6.
- British Parliamentary Election Results 1918-1949, FWS Craig
