= Cheddleton =

Village in Staffordshire, England

Coordinates: 53.064°N 2.043°W

- Village and Civil Parish
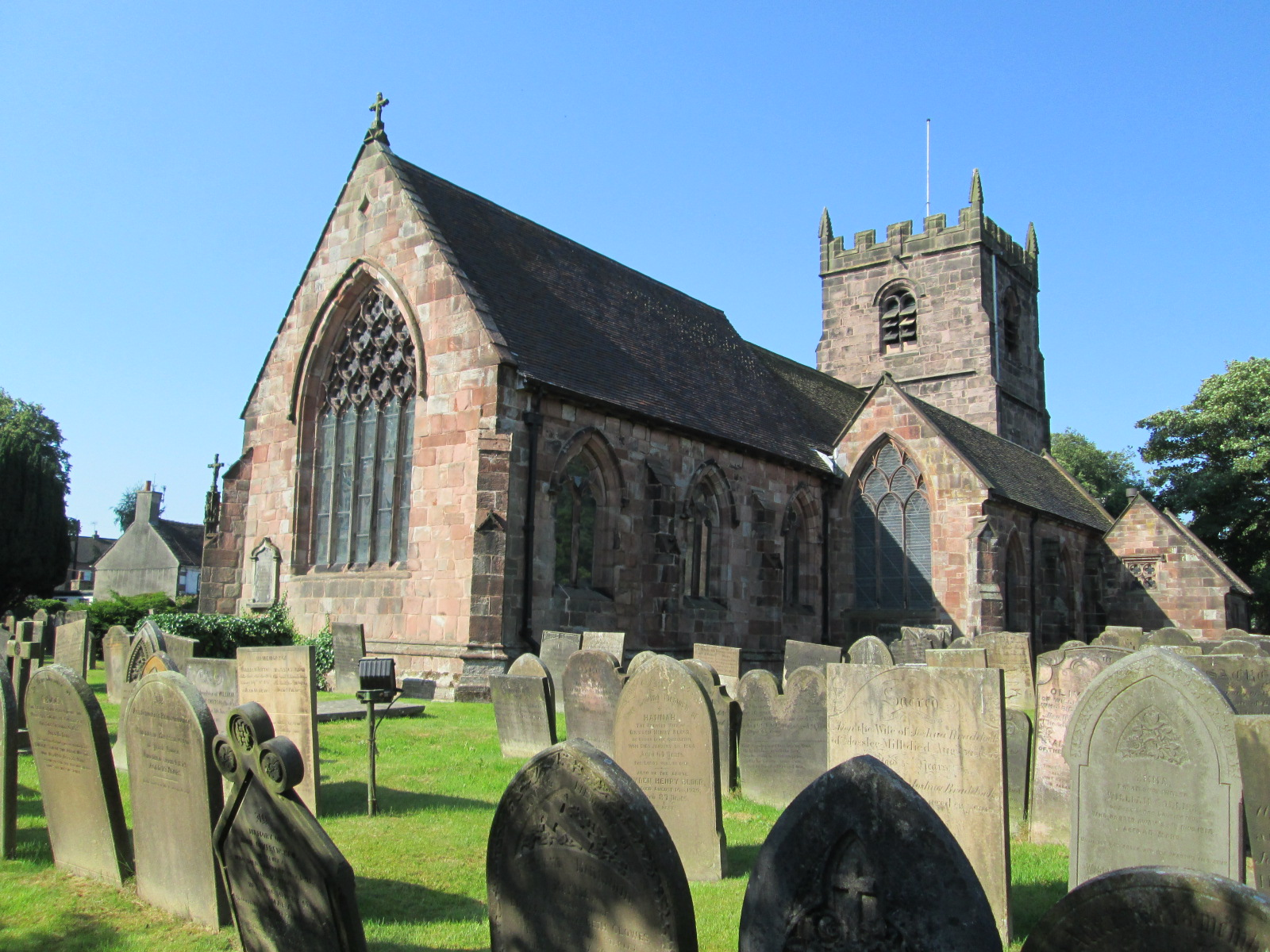
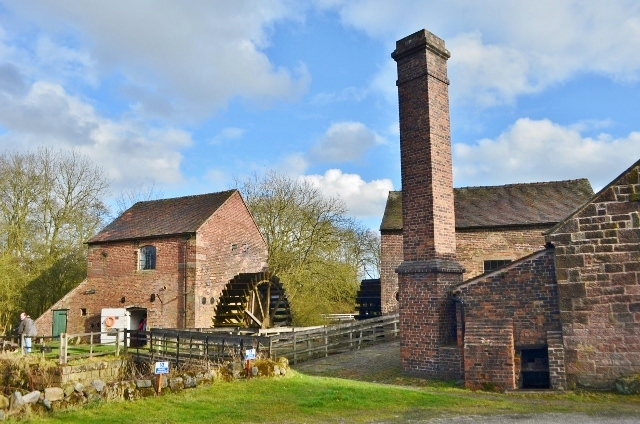
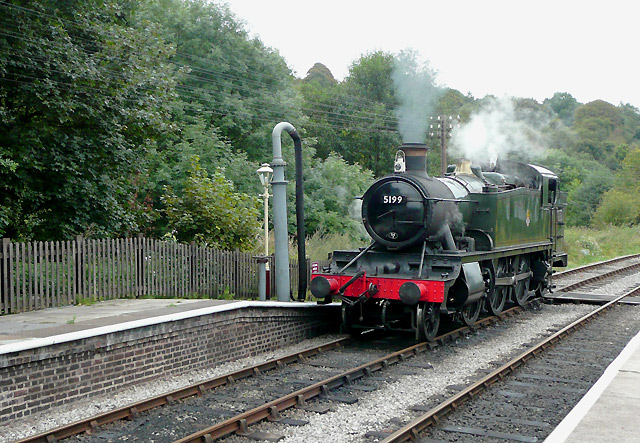
- St Edward the Confessor Church Flint Mill Churnet Valley Railway

- Location within Staffordshire
- Population: 6,311 (2011)
- OS grid reference: SJ972518
- District: Staffordshire Moorlands
- Shire county: Staffordshire
- Region: West Midlands
- Country: England
- Sovereign state: United Kingdom
- Post town: Leek
- Postcode district: ST13
- Dialling code: 01538
- Police: Staffordshire
- Fire: Staffordshire
- Ambulance: West Midlands
- UK Parliament: Staffordshire Moorlands

Cheddleton is an ancient parish and village in the Staffordshire Moorlands, near to the town of Leek, England.

== History ==
The earliest reference to the village of Cheddleton is in the Domesday Book when it was held by Roger de Montgomery, Earl of Arundel and Early of Shropshire.

The church dedicated to St Edward the Confessor dates from the 13th Century with Elizabethan additions and a major restoration in 1863/64 overseen by Sir G Gilbert Scott. The bell tower houses a ring of 6 bells with the tenor weighing 11cwt (567 kg) in the scale of G.

The village is divided into two distinct communities – the traditional village and the modern Redrow development located at St. Edward's Park, on the grounds of the old St. Edward's Psychiatric Hospital. This extensive site has been redeveloped and many of the old listed hospital buildings have been renovated, including the old hospital water tower, the highest building in the surrounding area, which now serves as an impressive private dwelling.

The traditional village is served by one shop, three public houses, a veterinary surgery, an off licence and two churches: St Edward's (Anglican) and St Andrew's (Methodist). The modern development has limited amenities, although there is a Latin American cuisine restaurant situated on the canal side, nearby.

The village hit the headlines in March 2006 when a fire at a house on Hillside Road killed four people. The cause of the fire was quickly established as arson and eight months later a local man called Mark Goldstraw was found guilty on four counts of murder. He was sentenced to life imprisonment with a recommended minimum term of 35 years.

The village is twinned with Mitterteich in Germany. The twinning association holds regular meetings and exchanges between the two villages.

Ashcombe Park in Cheadle Road is a Grade II* listed stately house built by James Trubshaw between 1807 and 1811.

=== St Edward's Church ===
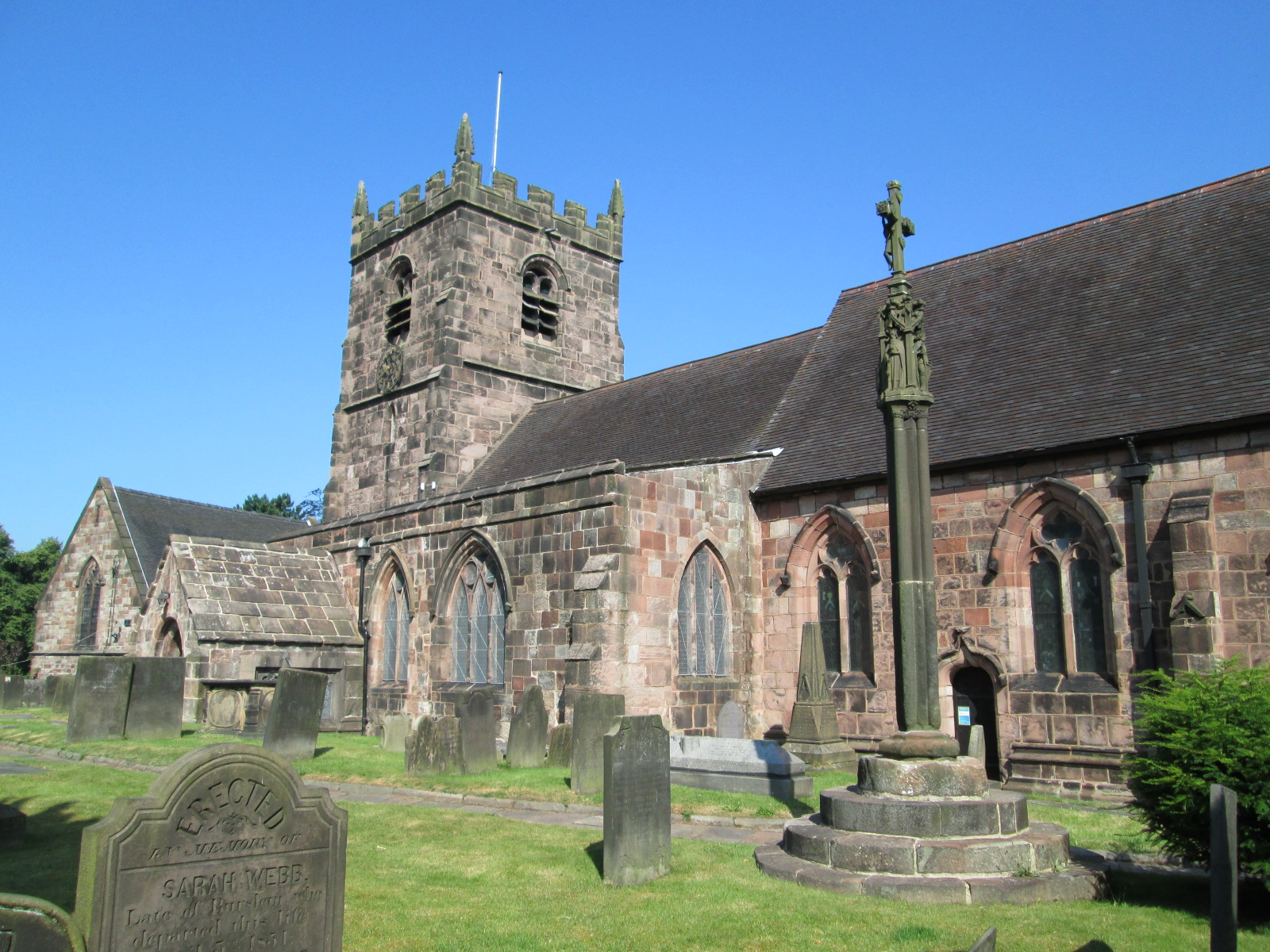
Church of St Edward the Confessor, and the churchyard cross

The parish church of St Edward the Confessor is on Hollow Lane; it is a Grade II* listed building. It was built from the 13th to 15th century.

In the churchyard are buried Sir Thomas Wardle (1831–1909) and his wife Elizabeth. Thomas Wardle owned a dyeworks in Leek which specialised in silk. He was a friend of the architect George Gilbert Scott, Jr. and of the artist William Morris: in the 1860s there were additions to the church by Scott, and stained-glass windows in the church were created by artists associated with William Morris.

The cross in the churchyard is an ancient monument. The base is medieval; the upper part is by George Gilbert Scott Jr. and features Instruments of the Passion designed by William Morris.

=== Cheddleton Flint Mill ===
Cheddleton Flint Mill is a Grade II* listed building, situated along the Caldon Canal. It is a prime example of Staffordshire's industrial past – a flint grinding watermill previously used for supplying the pottery industry further along the canal in Stoke-on-Trent. It is open to the public free of charge, and has been preserved, with help from the Heritage Lottery Fund, by the Cheddleton Flint Mill Industrial Heritage Trust.

== Population ==
The 2011 census records a total population for Cheddleton of 5,444 persons and 2,267 households.

== Events ==
Every year there is a carnival organised by the Cheddleton Carnival Committee on the second Saturday in August, held on the Ashcombe Park Cricket Club car park. The committee also organises other events in the village throughout the rest of the year, most notably the Bonfire Night fireworks display – held, again, in the car park, and the 'Duck Race', held annually at the Boat Inn and raced along the canal. The committee raises funds for Cancer Research UK and to date have raised over £750,000.

== Schools ==
Cheddleton is served by St. Edward's CE (c) First School, close to St. Edward's Church and the local community centre. Children attend the school from the beginning of their education up to Key Stage 2 (Reception class to Year 4). The school has an additional nursery provision and before / after school clubs provided on-site by Early Stages Ltd who also run Teddy's Garden Day nursery from a converted hospital building on St Edwards Park.

The old schoolhouse has been turned into a well established tea room, there is also a long-standing beauty room, you will also find the parish council committee room, just down the road from St. Edward's. On the St Edward's site, the former isolation hospital has been restored and converted into a children's day nursery.

== Transport history ==
The Caldon Canal, completed in 1778, passes through the village. By the early 1970s the canal was derelict but it was reopened at a ceremony held at Cheddleton Top Lock on 21 September 1974. There is an unusual timber straddle warehouse over the canal adjacent to the A520 road bridge.

The North Staffordshire Railway opened its Churnet Valley Railway on 1 September 1849, and opened a railway station at Cheddleton. Closed in 1963, today it is operated as part of a preserved railway.

== Sports ==
Cheddleton is home to Leek RUFC, who play their home games at Post & Times Park on St. Edward's Park. Cheddleton is also home to Ashcombe Park Cricket Club, who play their home games at Ashcombe Park Cricket Ground at the south end of the village.

The John Pointon Sports And Recreation Facility was opened at Windy Arbour, Cheddleton on the ground of the old Berresford Bus site.

Cheddleton was also home to one of the best loved MotoX tracks in the UK, the steep, mostly natural sand track hosted numerous rounds of various local and national championships.

Over the years many riders who have moved on to race at an international level have competed at Cheddleton including the son of Ron Haslam, current World Superbike rider and former Moto GP rider Leon Haslam.

== Notable people ==
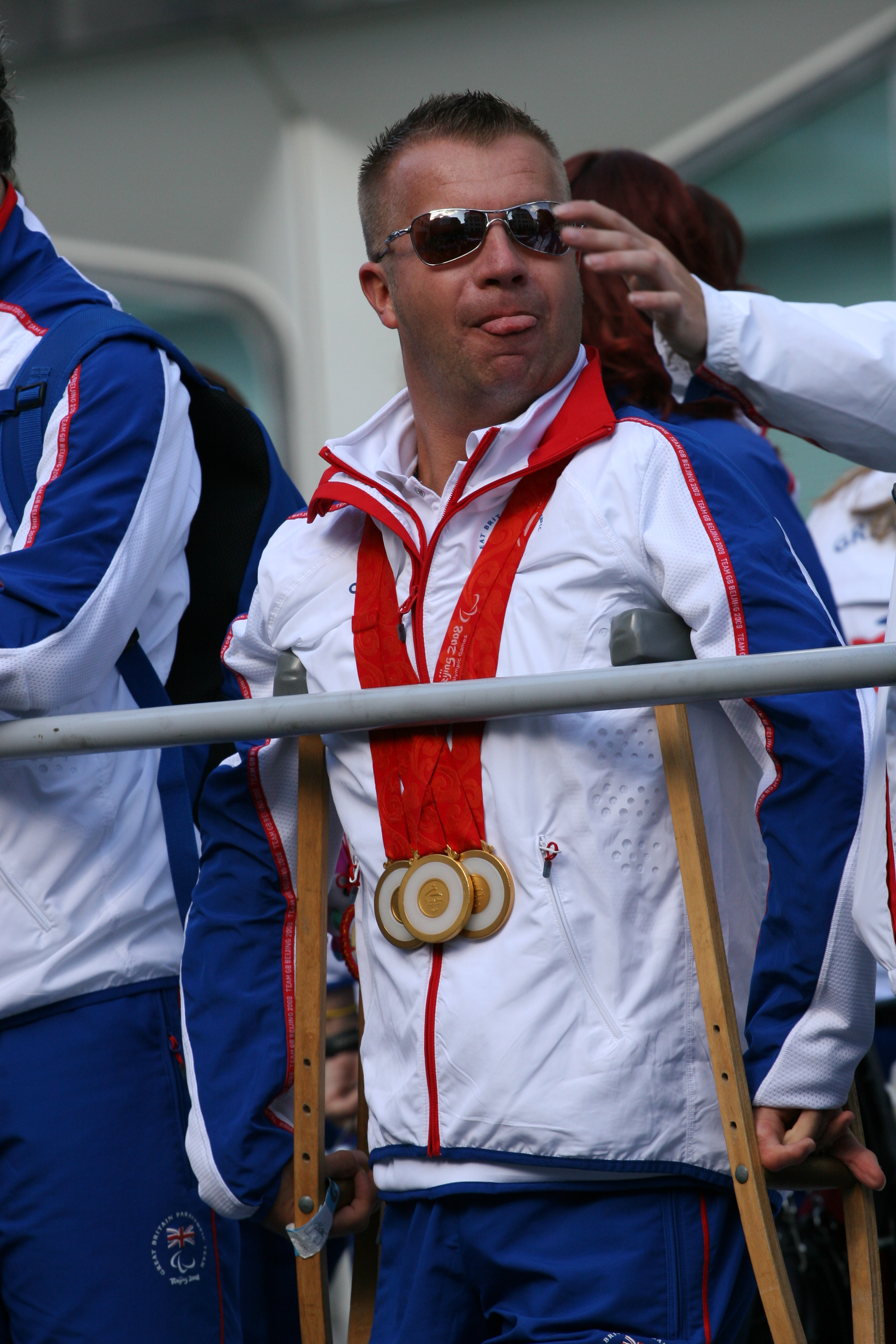
Lee Pearson, 2008

- Isaac Findler (1778-1824), a local painter of religious themes and rural views.
- Sampson Walker (1843–1933), businessman and political figure in Canada, born locally, emigrated to Canada and founded the Walker Oil Company in 1903; member of the Winnipeg city council from 1903 to 1907 and a member of the Legislative Assembly of Manitoba
- Charles Boucher (1856–1940), Anglican priest and the first Archdeacon of Loughborough
- Sybil Leek (1917–1982), an English witch, astrologer, occult author and self-proclaimed psychic who wrote 60 books. She was born in Normacot, and grew up at Victoria Cottages off Station Road in Cheddleton.
- Ewen Henderson (1934–2000), ceramic artist of irregular, hand-built forms
- Sir Lee Pearson (born 1974), a Paralympic horse riding champion who lives locally. He has won 14 Paralympic gold medals, and in 2004 was awarded BBC Midlands Sports Personality of the Year.
- Jessica Sylvester (born 1978), freestyle swimmer, competed at the 2008 Summer Olympics, grew up locally

== See also ==
- Listed buildings in Cheddleton
