= St Matthew's Hospital =

Lunatic asylum built in 1864 in Burntwood, Staffordshire

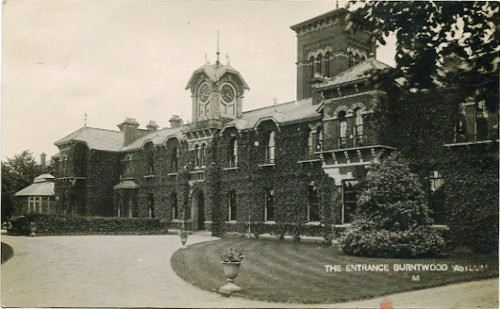
- St Matthew's Hospital

- Shown in Staffordshire

Geography
- Location: Burntwood, England
- Coordinates: 52.6836°N 1.8889°W

Organisation
- Type: Mental health

History
- Founded: 1864
- Closed: 1995

St Matthew's Hospital, formerly known as the Burntwood Asylum, was a mental health facility in Burntwood, Staffordshire, England. Founded as the Second Staffordshire County Asylum in 1864, it was one of three lunatic asylums built in the county of Staffordshire. The plan was for the asylum to house 500 patients, but it was later expanded to provide a capacity of 1,302 beds. The asylum complex included the main facility, an electricity plant, gas works, bakery, fire department, farm, mortuary, landscaped and vegetable gardens and cemetery.

During World War II, the asylum took in emergency civilian and military patients, including the first group of 242 injured and sick soldiers evacuated after the Battle of Dunkirk. In 1948, the hospital was transferred to the National Health Service and officially became St Matthew's Hospital. The hospital closed in 1995. Most buildings were demolished and the site was re-used as a new housing development.

== History ==
=== Early history ===
Three lunatic asylums for the poor were built by the county of Staffordshire during the 19th century. Stafford Asylum was the first to be established in 1818. The second Staffordshire Asylum, typically referred to as the Burntwood Asylum, was built in 1864, due to the growing number of mentally ill patients in the county. The last asylum was built in Cheddleton in 1892. It was later renamed St Edward’s Hospital.

The Burntwood Asylum was constructed on the 94 acre estate at Hobstone Hill, east of Christchurch. The cost of the land was £7,880. The county hired Scottish architect, William Lambie Moffatt (1807 – 1882) to design and oversee the construction of the new facility. Moffatt had previously worked on the Montrose Asylum in Montrose, Scotland. Moffatt designed the building in the Rundbogenstil style, using a corridor layout, with two separate male and female wings.

The asylum, built with an initial cost of £65,000, consisted of the main facility, along with an electricity plant, gas works, bakery, fire department, farm, mortuary, landscaped and vegetable gardens and cemetery. The plan was for the asylum to house 500 patients, but it was later expanded to provide a capacity for 1,302 beds. In 1889, new dining and recreation halls were built. Extensions to both the female and male wings were added in 1897 and 1898, respectively. The first chapel, above the dining room, was in use until August, 1899.

The asylum staff included a medical superintendent, chaplain, officers, attendants, nurses, and artisans. The staff assigned daily work tasks to the patients. Men worked as farm laborers, tailors, and shoemakers. Women were responsible for domestic tasks: laundry, kitchen or needlework. Both men and women were responsible for cleaning the wards. Padded cells were used to contain violent patients or those with a history of self-harm.

=== 20th century ===
A new detached chapel, named St Matthew's Church, was added to the complex in January, 1900. A nurse's residence was built in 1914. During the First World War, several county asylums were converted to military hospitals and their patients were transferred to Burntwood Asylum. During the 1920's, the asylum was renamed the Burntwood Mental Hospital. New Emergency Medical Services were added at the beginning of World War II to accommodate civilian casualties in air raids. During the early 1940's, casualties from the Birmingham Blitz were transferred to Burntwood Hospital and housed within the grounds in Nissen huts. From 1940 to 1947, the asylum took in emergency civilian and military patients, including the first group of 242 soldiers evacuated after the Battle of Dunkirk. The hospital joined the National Health Service and became St Matthew's Hospital in 1948.

=== Closure and redevelopment ===
After the introduction of Care in the Community in the early 1980s, a new government policy of treating and caring for mentally disabled people in their homes rather than in an institution, St Matthew's hospital went into decline and later closed in 1995. The remaining patients either joined local community care programs or were transferred into private psychiatric hospitals. The contents of the building remained in place as the buildings were abandoned. A decision was made by the Lichfield District Council to demolish the remaining buildings and use the site for a new residential development. Buildings that escaped being demolished were St Matthew's Social club, the administrative building and the chapel. The new development with 332 houses was completed in 1999.The administration building was subsequently converted into apartments and the chapel became a children's nursery.

== See also ==
- Lunacy Act 1845
- Brislington House
- York Retreat
