= James Trubshaw =

English architect (1777–1853)

Grosvenor Bridge, Chester, in a lithograph by Thomas Bailey

James Trubshaw (13 February 1777 – 28 October 1853) was an English builder, architect and civil engineer. His civil engineering works include the construction of the Grosvenor Bridge in Chester, Cheshire, then the longest stone span. He also pioneered the technique of underexcavation with the straightening the leaning tower of St Chad's in Wybunbury, Cheshire.

== Early life and career ==
He was born to stonemason, builder and engineering contractor, James Trubshaw and his second wife Elizabeth (née Webb), at the Mount near Colwich in Staffordshire, the second son in a family of seven sons and two daughters. He was educated in Rugeley, but left school aged only eleven to start work in his father's business. His earliest experience included working on buildings such as Sandon Hall, Fonthill Abbey, Buckingham Palace and Windsor Castle. In 1795, he worked on Wolseley Bridge near Colwich, and many of his early projects were bridges.

On the death of his father in 1808, Trubshaw started a building business in Stone; an early commission was to build Ashcombe Park. He worked for a time in partnership with the Lichfield architect Thomas Johnson (1794–1865), who was to become his son-in-law. In 1827, Trubshaw became a member of the Institution of Civil Engineers, and presented several papers there. He later became the chief engineer of the Trent and Mersey Canal Company, and superintended the construction of reservoirs, feeders and railways for the company.

Although he received only a limited education, he was a gifted practical engineer. His obituary in The Gentleman's Magazine described him as a man "of original genius, of great natural talent, and persevering energy ... gifted with an instinctive perception of all great mechanical principles, uniformly guided by excellent common sense."

== Works ==
=== Bridges ===
His best-known work is the construction of the Grosvenor Bridge over the River Dee at Chester, Cheshire (1827–33). Designed by Thomas Harrison, the project had been dismissed as impractical by prominent engineers of the time including Thomas Telford. Its single stone span of 200 feet was considered the longest in the world when it was completed in 1833. The Institution of Civil Engineers, to whom Trubshaw presented models of the bridge showing its method of construction, described his methods as having "excited the admiration of the Profession." Trubshaw himself said that he was "convinced the arch will be the largest and finest stone arch in Europe and will consequently be a lasting monument to the glory and superiority of Great Britain."

He also constructed many other bridges, including Exeter Bridge over the Derwent in Derby, Derbyshire (1850; now demolished).

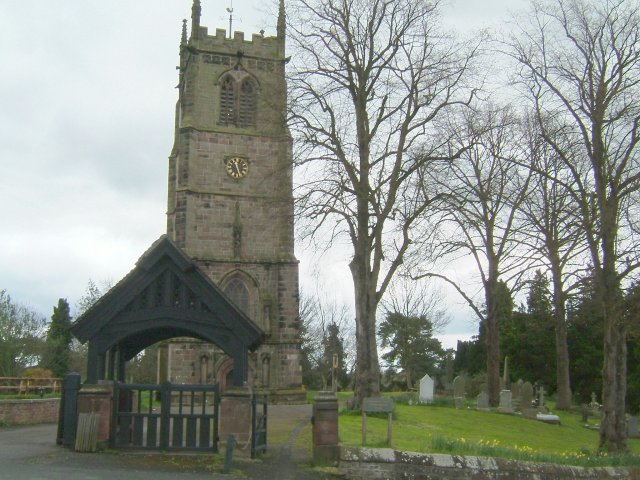
Leaning tower of St Chad's

=== Leaning tower of St Chad's ===
Trubshaw is also known for stabilising the leaning tower of the church of St Chad's Church, Wybunbury, Cheshire, in 1832. At that date, the 29.3 m tower inclined to the north east by 1.6 m, due to its location on sloping sandy soil with underlying saliferous beds, and it had tilted an average of 12 mm per year since 1790. Trubshaw pioneered a method which involved no "wonderful machining or secret inventions" and was described in the Architectural Magazine of 1836:

"Mr Trubshaw, after examining well the outside of the foundations, commenced

digging down the inside. After having got below the level of the footings (lowest stones of the foundation), he proceeded to bore a row of auger-holes clear through under the foundations of the high side, the holes nearly touching each other. These holes he filled with water; and, corking them up with a piece of marl, let them rest for the night. In the morning, the water had softened the marl to a puddle; and the building gradually began to sink, another row of holes were bored, but, not exactly so far as the first row. They were filled with water as before; and the high side not only kept sinking, but the fracture in the centre kept gradually closing up. This process was

continued till the steeple became perfectly straight, and the fracture imperceptible."

This is the earliest documented application of the technique of underexcavation, which has since been successfully used to stabilise the Metropolitan Cathedral of Mexico City (1993–98) and the Leaning Tower of Pisa (1999–2001). Trubshaw's work accords with modern conservation principles as it was invisible, used the minimum intervention required and could be reversed or repeated if necessary. Despite the extreme instability of the ground, the straightened tower of St Chad's stood without further intervention for over 150 years; it was restabilised using reinforced concrete foundations in 1989.

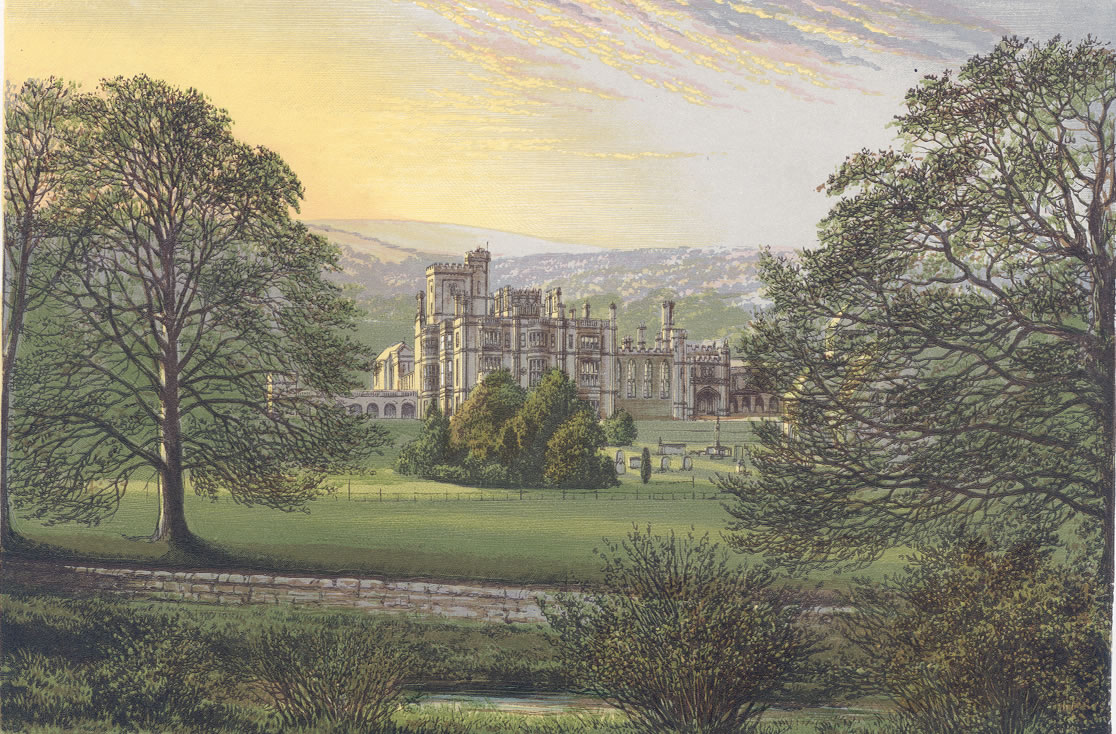
Ilam Hall in Morris's Country Seats, 1880

=== Other works ===
Trubshaw's other works include a column commemorating the landing of George IV at Ramsgate, Kent (1821), Ilam Hall, Staffordshire, near Ashbourne (1821–26), Weston House, Warwickshire (now demolished) and the orangery and lodges of Heath House, Checkley, Staffordshire (1830–1).

He designed several Commissioners' Churches, including St James' Church, Longton, Staffordshire (1833–34), St James' Church, Congleton, Cheshire (1847–48) and Holy Trinity, Hanley, Staffordshire (1848–49). He also rebuilt St Michael's Church, Great Wolford, Warwickshire and St Lawrence's Church, Chorlton, Staffordshire.

== Personal life ==
Trubshaw was described as tall and athletic. In 1801, he married Mary Bott of Stone; they had three sons and three daughters. Their eldest son, Thomas Trubshaw (1802–42), also became an architect; their eldest daughter married the architect Thomas Johnson, and their daughter Susanna was a poet and essayist. The family settled in Little Haywood near Colwich in Staffordshire in 1809, and Trubshaw remained there until his death in 1853. He is buried at Colwich, where the parish church contains a memorial to him. His brother John (1776-1834) appears to be the great-grandfather of the soldier and actor Arthur M. Temple Trubshawe (1905-1985) via grandson Vyvyan Trubshawe (1853-1924) who was also an architect.
