= PLCL =

PLCL may refer to:

- Park Lane College Leeds, a former British further education college, now part of Leeds City College
- Parker Lewis Can't Lose, a 1990s television series
