= Keighley College =

Further education college in England

Coordinates: 53.8683°N 1.9007°W

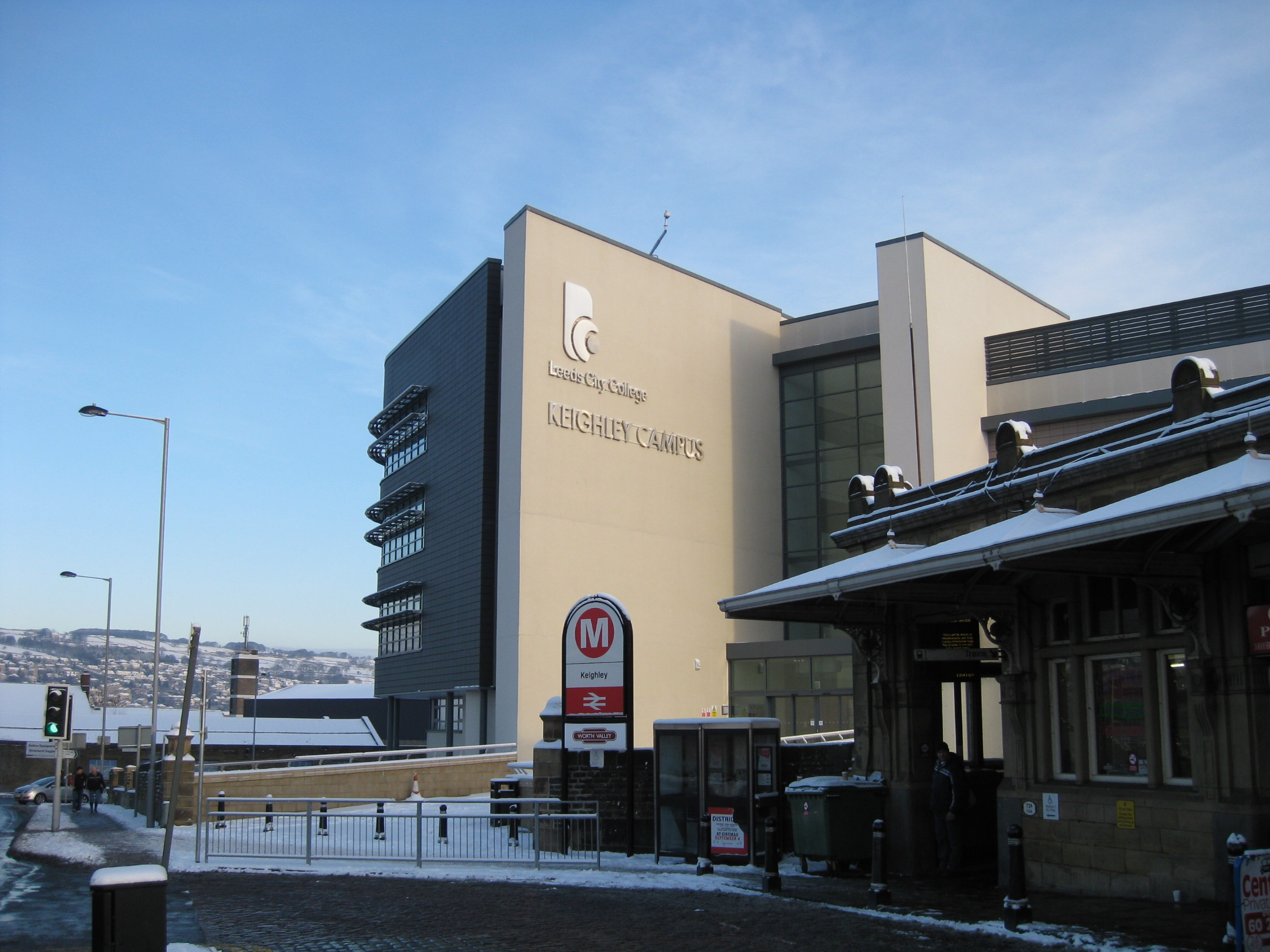
The college in 2010, while part of Leeds City College

Keighley College is a further education college in Keighley, West Yorkshire, England. It traces its origins to Keighley Mechanics' Institute, founded in 1825. IFrom 2006 to 2017 it was part of Park Lane College Leeds and Leeds City College, branded as their Keighley Campus, but is now once more a freestanding college, within the Luminate Education Group.

== History ==
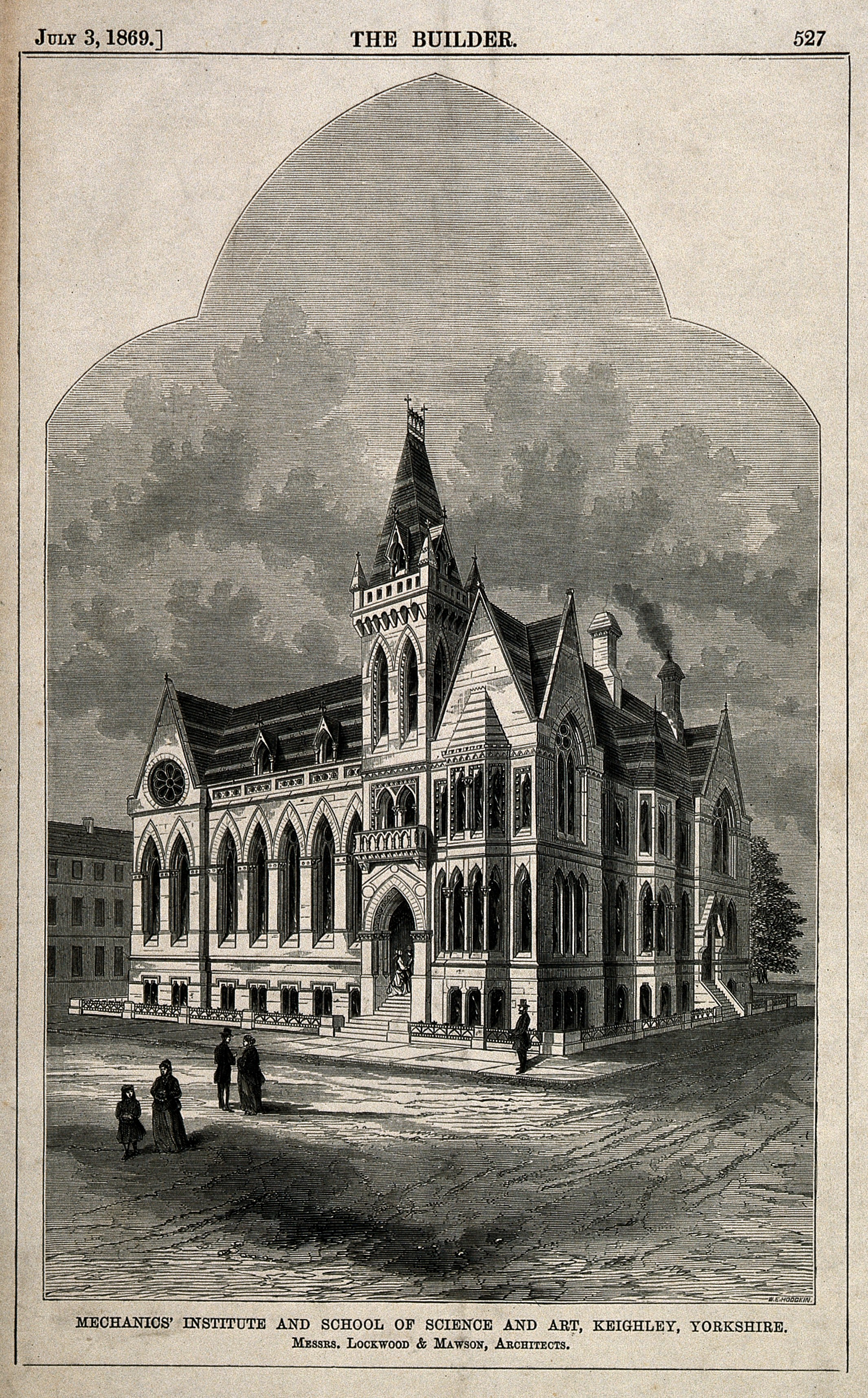
The Mechanics' Institute building

Keighley Mechanics' Institute was founded in 1825 as "a society for mutual instruction, and to establish a library for that purpose". Patrick Brontë, father of the literary sisters, became a member in 1833, and his daughters attended a lecture there by his curate William Weighton in 1840. The institute opened a new building in 1834, holding a concert with professional musicians to celebrate.

This original building, on the corner of North Street and Bow Street, was outgrown by the 1869s and a new building was built at the junction of North Street and Cavendish Street. The foundation stone was laid by Isaac Holden on 12 December 1868 and it was opened by the Duke of Devonshire on 30 September 1870. Keighley Trade School and Art School was established there in 1871. A report in The Builder in 1871 describes Keighley Trade School, and declares that it "inaugurates a new era in the educational history of the neighbourhood", with activities including science lectures and art classes.

Nikolaus Pevsner described the building as "By Lockwood & Mawson, 1868, N. extension 1887. Gothic with a tower. The dominating building of Keighley", but notes in the Addenda that the building was damaged by fire in 1962 and that in 1964 "plans ... were being discussed to replace the building with an extension to the Technical College".

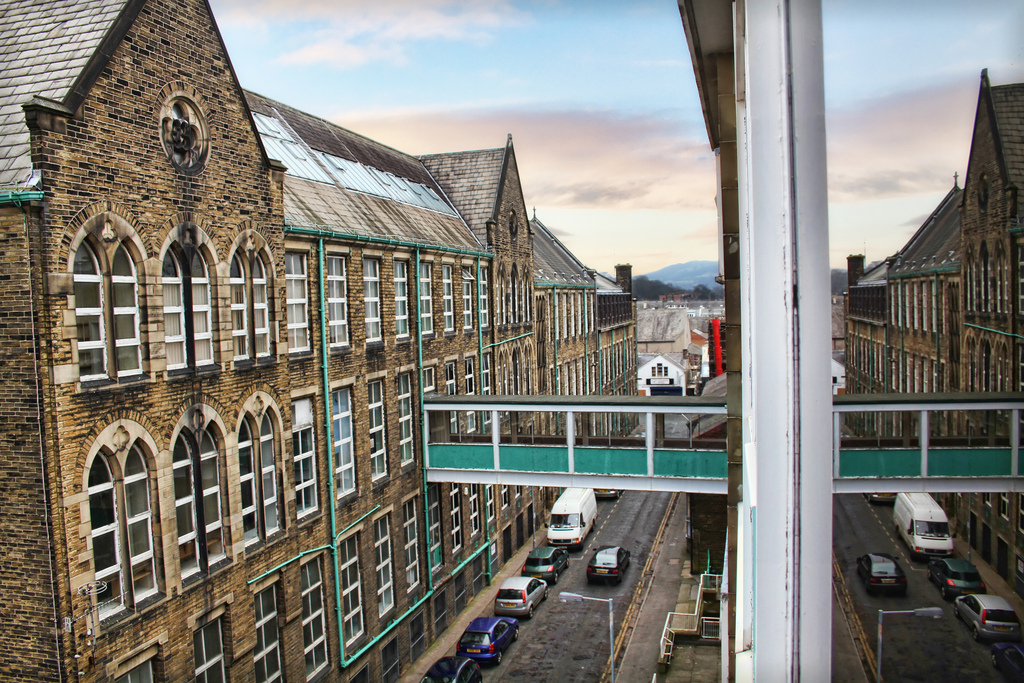
The bridge linking the buildings across Lord Street, seen in 2011

The building was demolished in 1967, despite local protest.

A new building for Keighley Technical College was built in 1955–1956, described by Pevsner as "By Hubert Bennett, the then County Architect. Next to the Mechanics' Institute. A building of moderate size and wholly up-to-date style. Stone and glass, of pleasing composition." It was linked by a corridor footbridge across Lord Street to the older building.

In 2007, the college merged with Park Lane College Leeds to become Park Lane College Leeds and Keighley, which then merged into Leeds City College in 2009. The Keighley site was known as the Keighley Campus.

In 2010, the college opened a new £30 million campus, near Keighley railway station, moving away from the former site on Cavendish Street, which was in need of repair and has since been demolished.

== The college today ==
The college provides courses for A-levels. T-Levels, vocational qualifications, apprenticeships, adult education, and special education.

The college includes an Industrial Centre of Excellence and a nationally acclaimed Star Centre facility, designed to encourage more young people to study STEM subjects (science, technology, engineering, and mathematics). This features a mock mission control centre, a planetarium, a simulated rocky planet surface and many other space-related items.

The Minister of State for Skills, Apprenticeships and Higher Education, Robert Halfon, visited the college in October 2023 as part of the "Love Our Colleges" campaign.
