= Thomas Ambler =

English architect

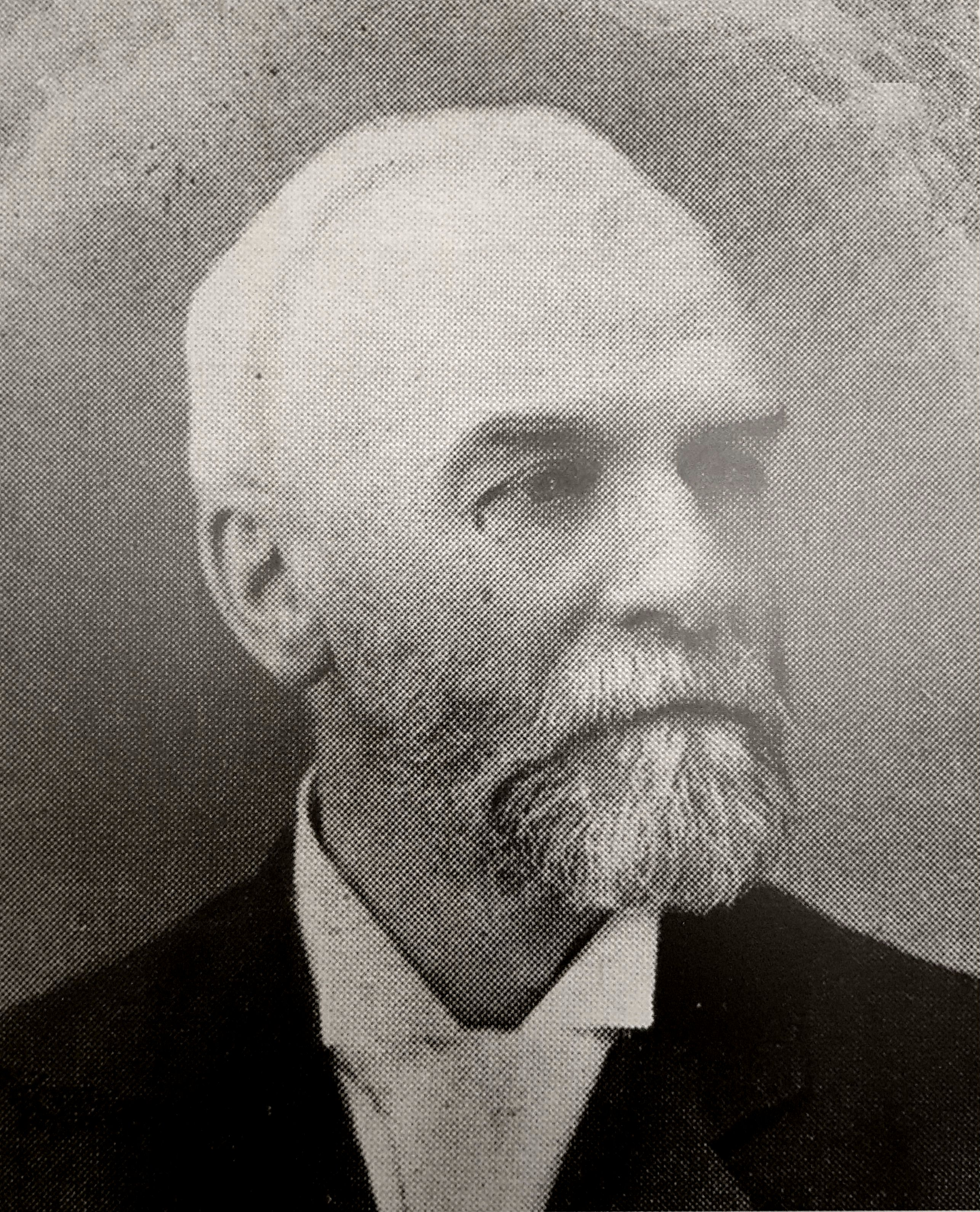
Thomas Ambler

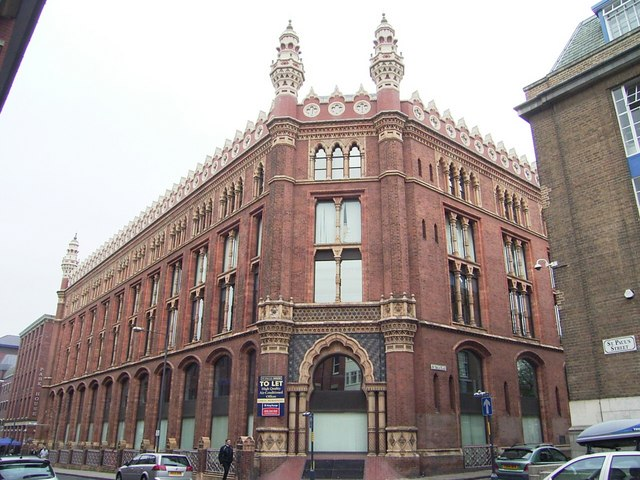
St Paul's House (Thomas Ambler, 1878) from St Paul's Street, showing the original entrance

Thomas Ambler (1838 – 1920) was an English architect, living and working in Leeds, West Yorkshire, England.

Ambler was a friend of the Mayor of Leeds and Member of Parliament, John Barran, who became his patron.

Among Ambler's surviving works are the Grade II* listed Moorish factory (now offices) of St Paul's House in Park Square, Leeds, Grade II listed buildings on the south side of Boar Lane, St James's Hall in New York Street, and the Grade II listed Alf Cooke printworks in Hunslet Road which now forms part of the Printworks Campus of Leeds City College.
