= Alf Cooke printworks =

Grade II listed building in Leeds, England

Coordinates: 53°47′19.5″N 1°32′11.4″W

Printworks Campus
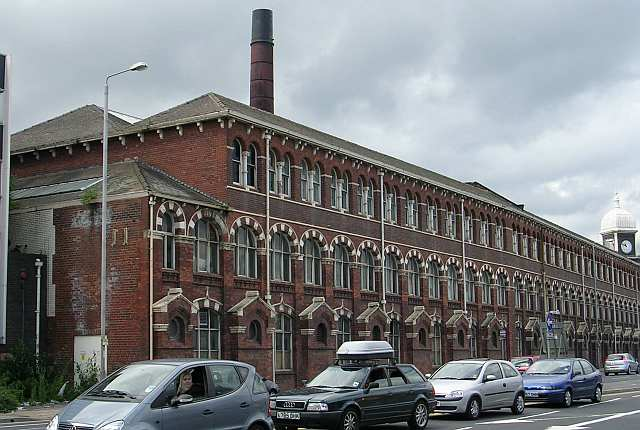
- The Printworks Factory In 2007, Opened as Leeds City College in 2013.
- Type: Further Education @ Leeds City College
- Active: 1881–2006 (as The Printworks)(Derelict between 2007 and 2011); September 2013–present (as Leeds City College)
- Location: Leeds, West Yorkshire, England
- Website: http://www.leedscitycollege.ac.uk/

The Alf Cooke printworks is a grade II listed former industrial building by Thomas Ambler, now the Printworks Campus of Leeds City College in Leeds, West Yorkshire, England. It was built in 1881 and rebuilt after a fire in 1894.

== Alf Cooke ==
Alf Cooke (1842–1902) founded his printing business in 1866. He expanded into colour printing in 1868 and moved his operation to Hunslet in the early 1870s. After his first works, on the east of Hunslet Road, burned down, he built a printworks on the west side of the road. This was burned down in 1894 and the existing building was built in 1895. The architect was Thomas Ambler. It was described in The British and Colonial Printer as "the largest, cleanest, healthiest and most completely fitted Printing works in the World."

in 1885 Cooke was appointed by Queen Victoria as "Her Majesty's Colour Printer", and in 1890 he was Mayor of Leeds.

His sons Harry and Alf junior took over the business after his death in 1902, but Alf junior's son Alf was killed in the Second World War. After Alf junior died in 1947 the family was not involved in the company, but the name "Cooke" was still used until 1981 when it became Bemrose Cartons.

In the 1950s the factory acquired the site of the former St Jude's Church, and a window from the church was preserved in the factory building.

== Later use ==
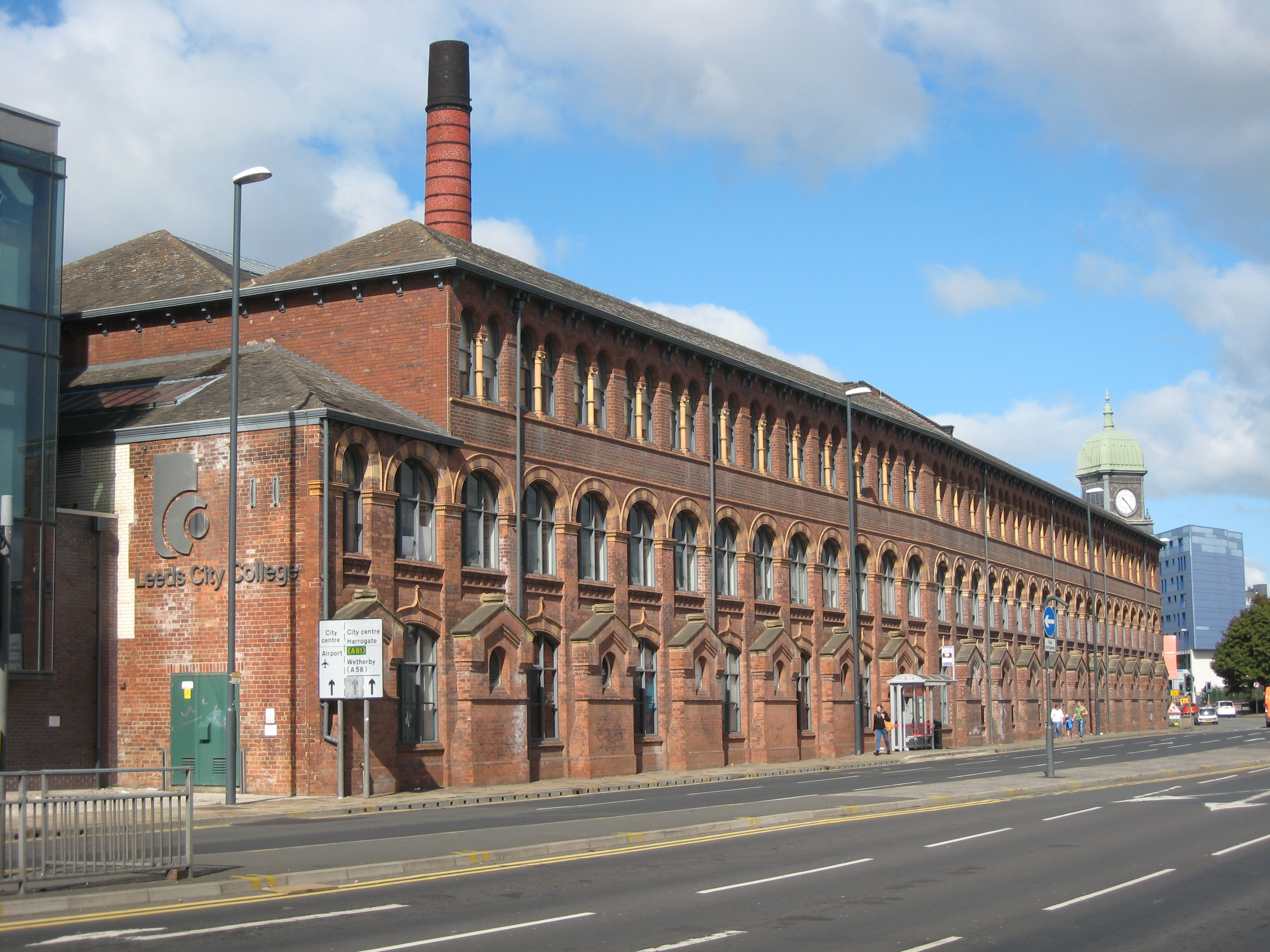
Converted into Leeds City College building

The works closed down in 2006. Plans had been put forward to convert it to offices, but it was announced in 2011 that the site would become part of Leeds City College. The College's Printworks Campus opened in September 2013, at a cost of £25 million for the renovation of the printhalls and the construction of new buildings adjacent.

== See also ==
- Listed buildings in Leeds (City and Hunslet Ward - southern area)
