= Leeds dripping riot =

1865 riot in Leeds, England

- Date: 22 February 1865
- Location: Park Square, Leeds, England; 53.798893°N 1.550969°W
- Caused by: Trial perceived as unfair

Parties
Local residents (approx. 1,000)	Police

Casualties
- Deaths: 1
- Arrested: 5
- Damage: Broken windows
- Charged: 5

The Leeds dripping riot was an act of civil disorder that occurred in Leeds, England on 22 February 1865. The riot was a response to the imprisonment of a local woman for the theft of dripping. During the riot one person was seriously injured and subsequently died while five people were arrested and charged with riotous conduct.

== Background ==
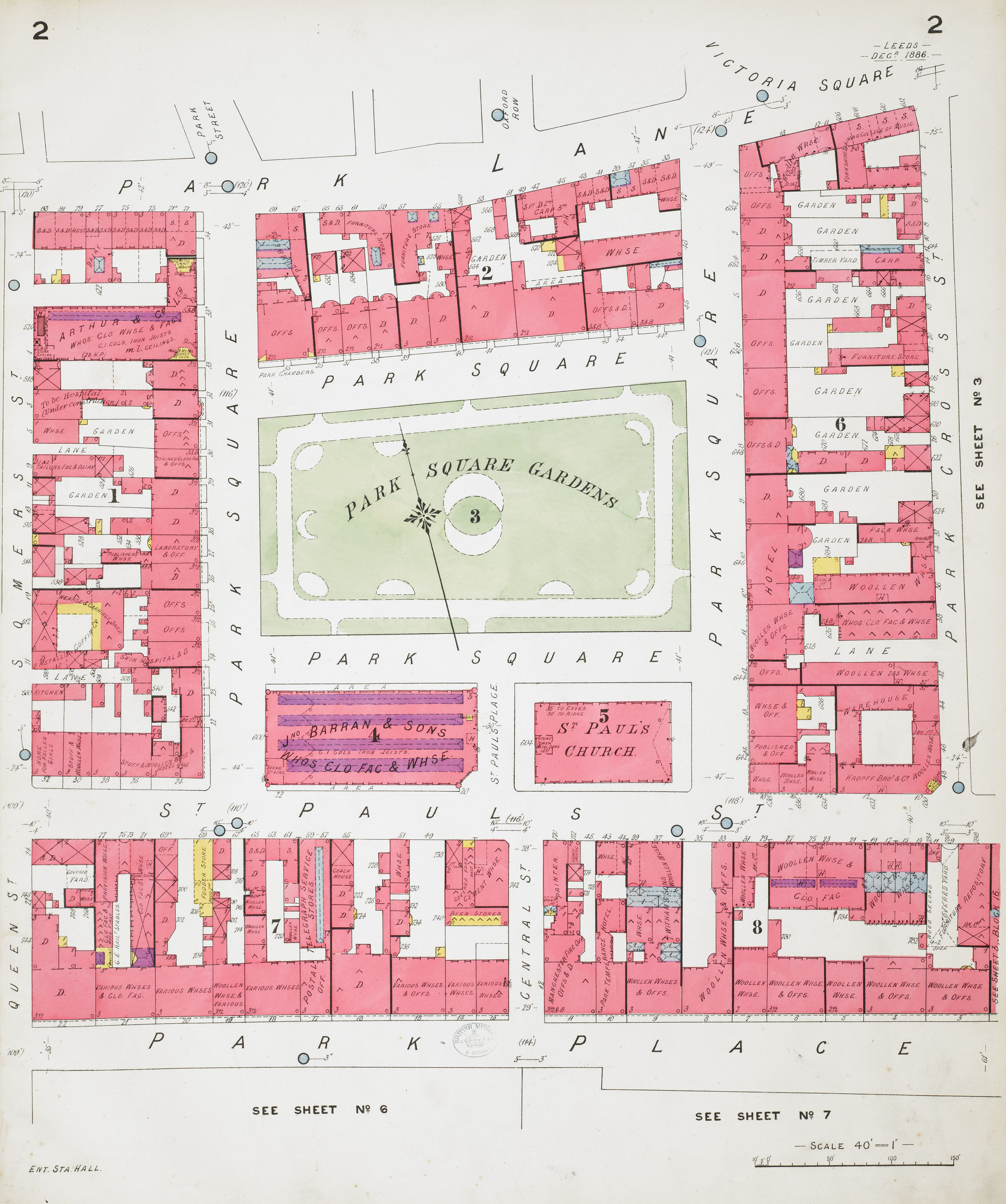
An 1886 insurance map of Park Square. Henry Chorley's house No 8 is on the east side

Eliza Stafford was a cook employed by Henry Chorley, a surgeon and local magistrate, at his house at 8 Park Square, Leeds, Yorkshire. In January 1865, Chorley discovered that Stafford had disposed of 2 pounds (0.9 kilograms) of dripping to a local dressmaker. Chorley was angered by Stafford's action, and pressed for her to be prosecuted for theft; the case was eventually heard before the Leeds Borough magistrates on 23 January 1865. During the trial, Stafford admitted to having disposed of the dripping, but claimed that disposing of the dripping was a perquisite of the job. Chorley, in evidence, stated that the incident was only one of several similar incidents, though this was the only one he had any direct evidence of. The magistrates convicted Stafford of the theft and sentenced her to one month's imprisonment in Armley Gaol.

== Protests ==
The case was widely reported and many people considered the prosecution petty and the punishment harsh. The critics also drew attention to the circumstances of the trial which for reasons unexplained had been heard in private, not in public as normal, and before magistrates known to Chorley. The Times reported chalked inscriptions expressing support for Stafford appearing throughout Leeds; and that Chorley had been insulted and accosted in the street. The protests culminated in a demonstration, estimated at being between 12,000 and 15,000 people, outside the prison on the Saturday before Stafford was due to be released from which a smaller number of people, about 700, protested outside Chorley's house. Apart from some snowballs being thrown, these protests all passed off peacefully.

== Riot ==
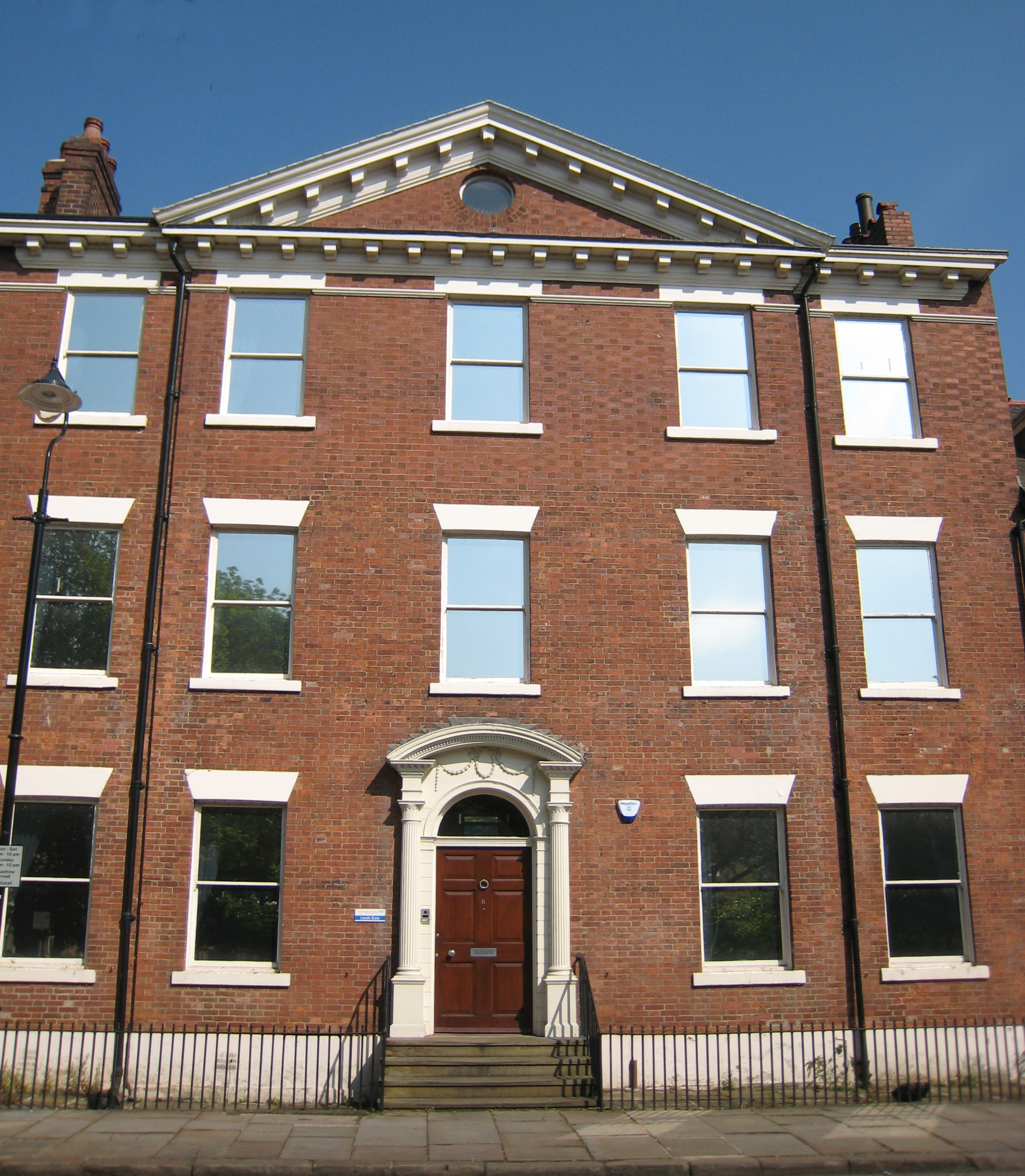
8 Park Square, Leeds - the home of Henry Chorley and the focus of the riot

On Tuesday 22 February, Eliza Stafford's period of imprisonment expired and at about 9 am a crowd of several thousand gathered outside Armley Gaol in expectation of her release. However Stafford had been released earlier around 7 am and had left Leeds to travel to Scarborough where her daughter resided.

The crowd, denied its target, mostly dispersed but about a thousand people marched from the prison to Chorley's house and threw stones that broke several windows in the house. The Chief Constable of Leeds, William Bell, and some police officers managed to form a cordon round the house and withstood several attempts by the protestors to break through the police line to the house. During the lunch hour the numbers of people in the square increased as workers came to view the affair. The Mayor of Leeds, John Darnton Luccock, worried by the crowd called for assistance from Bradford police and from the army at York. At 1 pm as many people left the square, their lunch periods over, the police decided to try and clear the square. After issuing a notice ordering the crowd to disperse, the police charged and drove everyone out of Park Square; during the charge one man, George Hudson, was trampled and severely injured – so severely that he subsequently died – and a number of men were arrested for riotous conduct.

This effectively ended the riot and, reinforced by the Bradford Police with two troops of the 8th Hussars from York on standby, the Leeds police prevented any further attempts at disturbance despite a sizable number of people assembling nearby in the evening and attempting to march upon Leeds Town Hall.

== Aftermath ==
The men arrested were tried for riotous conduct, but the magistrates took a lenient view and only one was imprisoned and then only for a week. The sentencing magistrate described the incident as "very silly excitement" and the other four defendants were bound over in the sum of £10.

Henry Chorley died in 1878; of Eliza Stafford there is no subsequent history.
