= Leeds College of Technology =

Further education college in England

Coordinates: 53.809325°N 1.532115°W

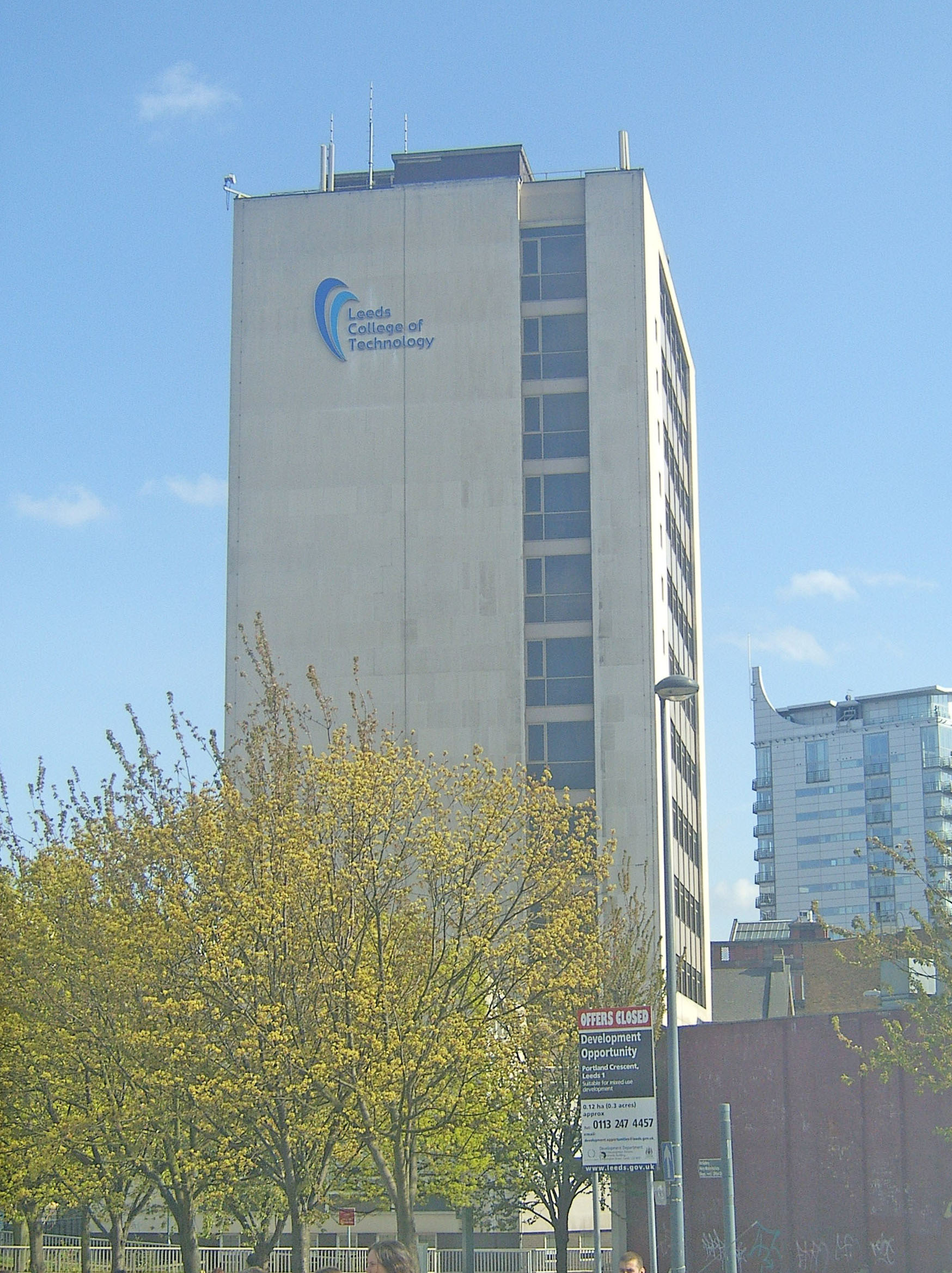
- Leeds College of Technology building in 2008
- Type: Further Education College
- Active: 1824–2009; 1 April 2009–28 June 2019 (as Leeds City College)(Moved to Quarry Hill)
- Location: Leeds, West Yorkshire, England
- Website: leedscitycollege.ac.uk

Leeds College of Technology
- Interactive map of the Leeds College of Technology area

General information
- Status: Demolished
- Demolished: 2021

Technical details
- Floor count: 12

Leeds College of Technology (formerly Kitson College) was a further education college in Leeds, in West Yorkshire, England. With a strong technical bias, the college supported the computing, engineering, social care and transport industries. In addition, the college was a national centre for print training and offered English language learning and teaching (ESOL). The Woodhouse Lane building was built in 1957 and opened in 1959, it was part of Leeds City College until June 2019 when the college closed after 60 years of activity and these facilities were moved to a brand new campus at Quarry Hill opposite the bus station.

It was founded in 1824 as part of the Leeds Mechanics' Institute, and in 1868 the college became the Leeds Institute of Science, Art and Literature, then the Branch College of Engineering and Science. It was renamed Kitson College in 1967 in honour of James Kitson, 1st Baron Airedale, and then Leeds College of Technology.

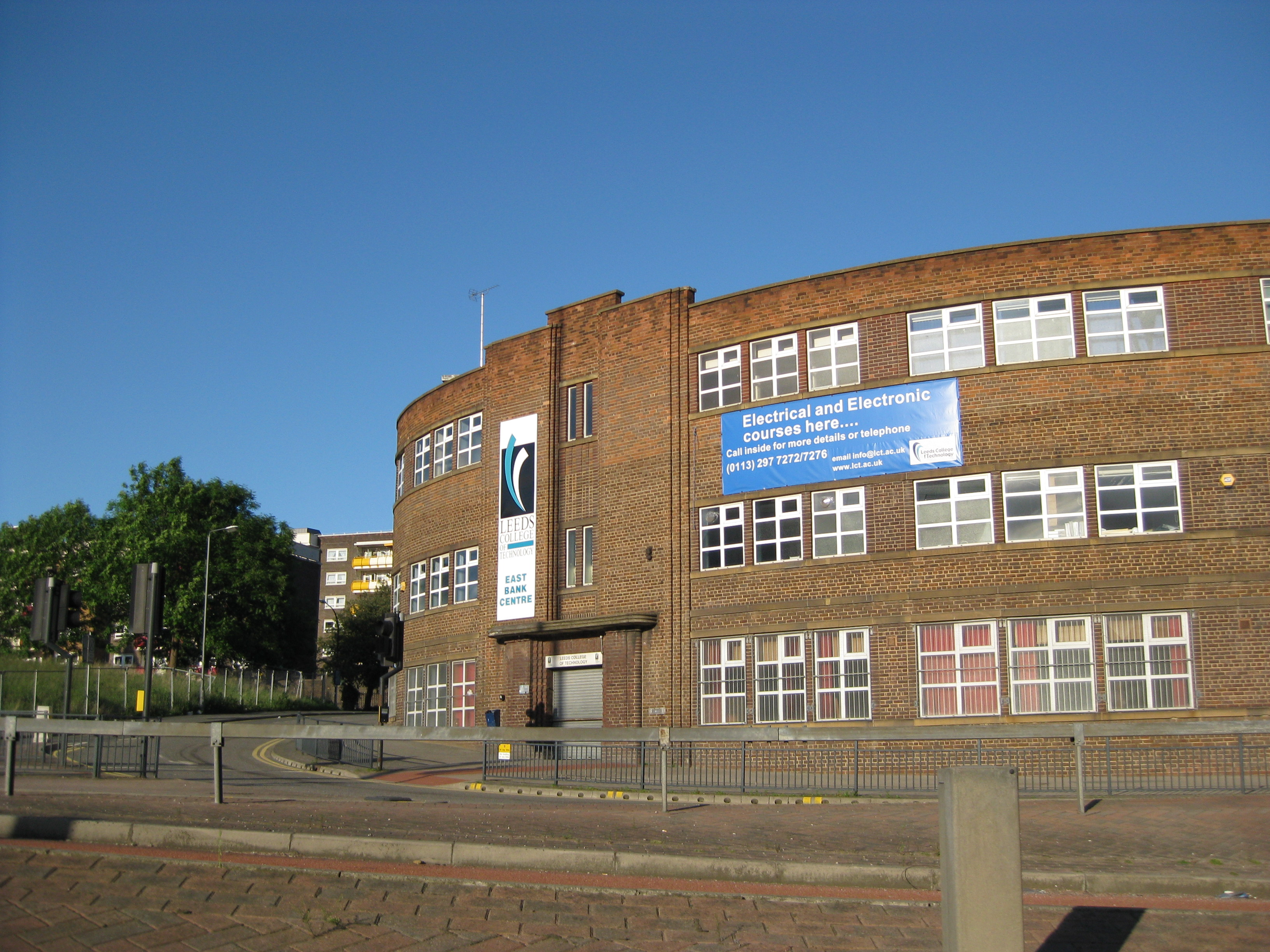
The East Bank Centre, Marsh Lane

The college served more than 5,000 students each year.

On 1 April 2009, Leeds College of Technology merged with Leeds Thomas Danby and the Park Lane College to form the new Leeds City College. The site on Cookridge Street was then known as the Technology Campus of the new college. On 26 January 2016 it was announced that the Health and Social Care services was to move to a new Quarry Hill campus then being built next to West Yorkshire Playhouse, now Leeds Playhouse. The whole building closed in July 2019 and was demolished during the summer of 2021 to make way for student lets. Work began on the Quarry Hill Campus in September 2016 and the building opened in July 2019. West Yorkshire Consortium of Colleges operated from Technology Campus until 2018.

The Technology Campus has played its part in rock history. The Who's album Live at Leeds had two tracks re-recorded here and Pink Floyd's song "See Emily Play" was written here after a gig in the building when it was still known as Kitson College.
