= St Pauls House, Leeds =

St Pauls House
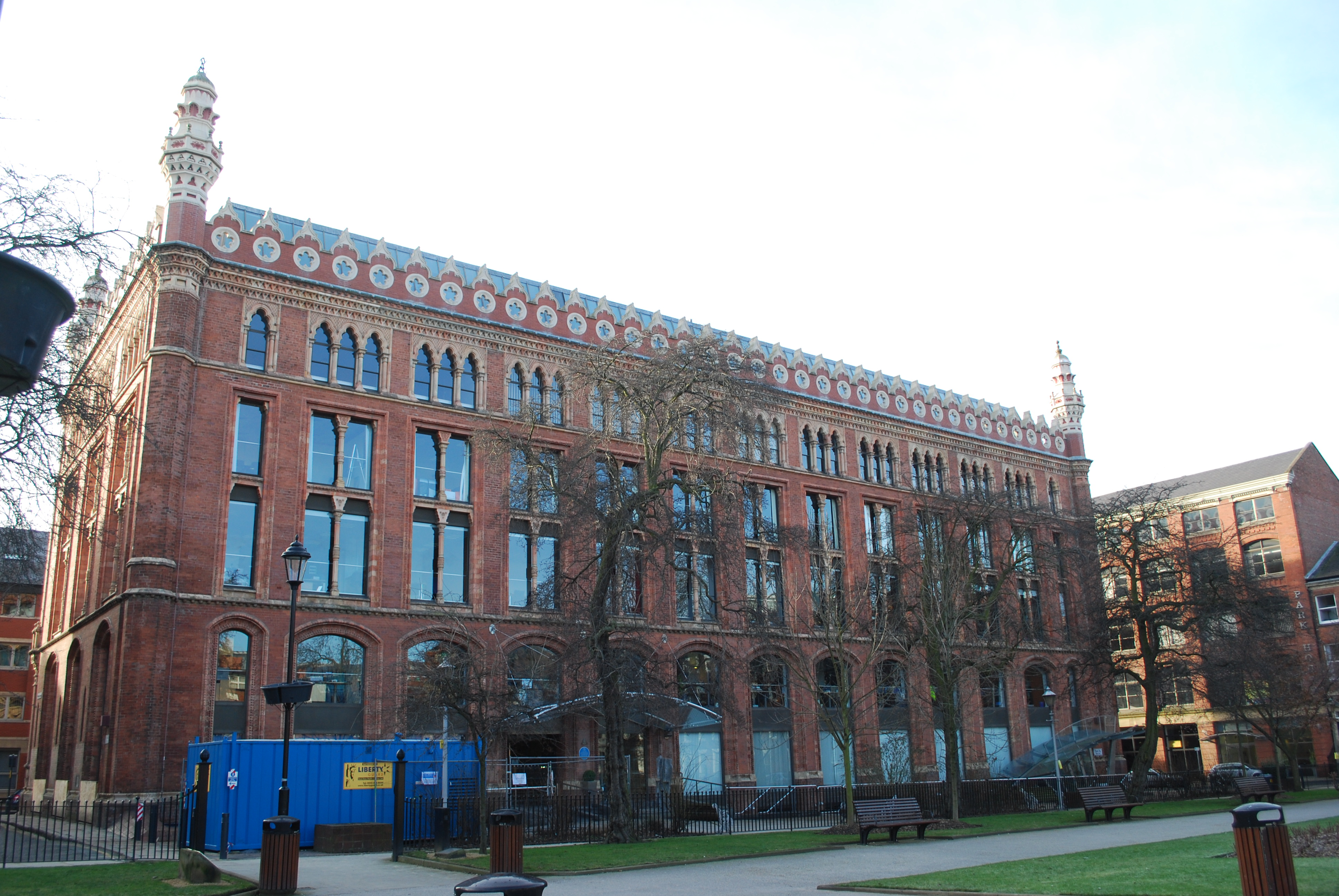
- Location: Park Square, Leeds, England
- Coordinates: 53.79833°N 1.55250°W
- Built: 1878
- Built for: John Barran
- Architect: Thomas Ambler

Listed Building – Grade II*
- Designated: September 1963
- Reference no.: 1256126

St. Pauls House is a historic building situated in Leeds, West Yorkshire, England. It was built in 1878 as a warehouse and cloth cutting works for Sir John Barran, 1st Baronet.

== History ==
St. Pauls House was built in 1878 in Park Square, Leeds as a warehouse and cloth cutting works for Sir John Barran, 1st Baronet. The building was designed by Thomas Ambler in an ornate Hispano-Moorish style.

It is a Grade II* listed building. The building was extensively altered and restored in 1976 with a wholly new interior. The minarets, originally terracotta, are now fibreglass reproductions.

DAC Beachcroft LLP (and DAC Beachcroft Claims Ltd) have used the property since May 2015.

== Gallery ==
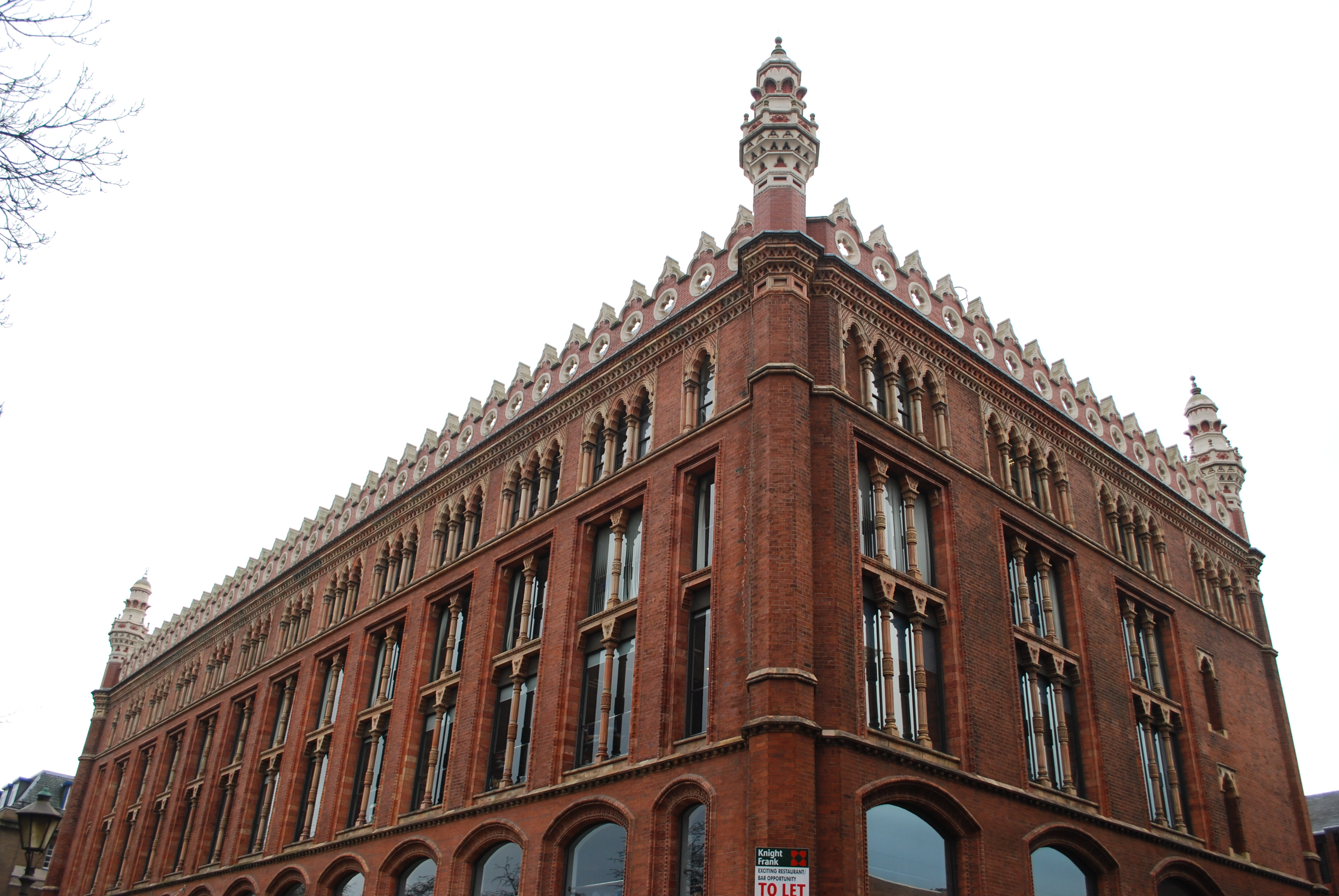
St Pauls House

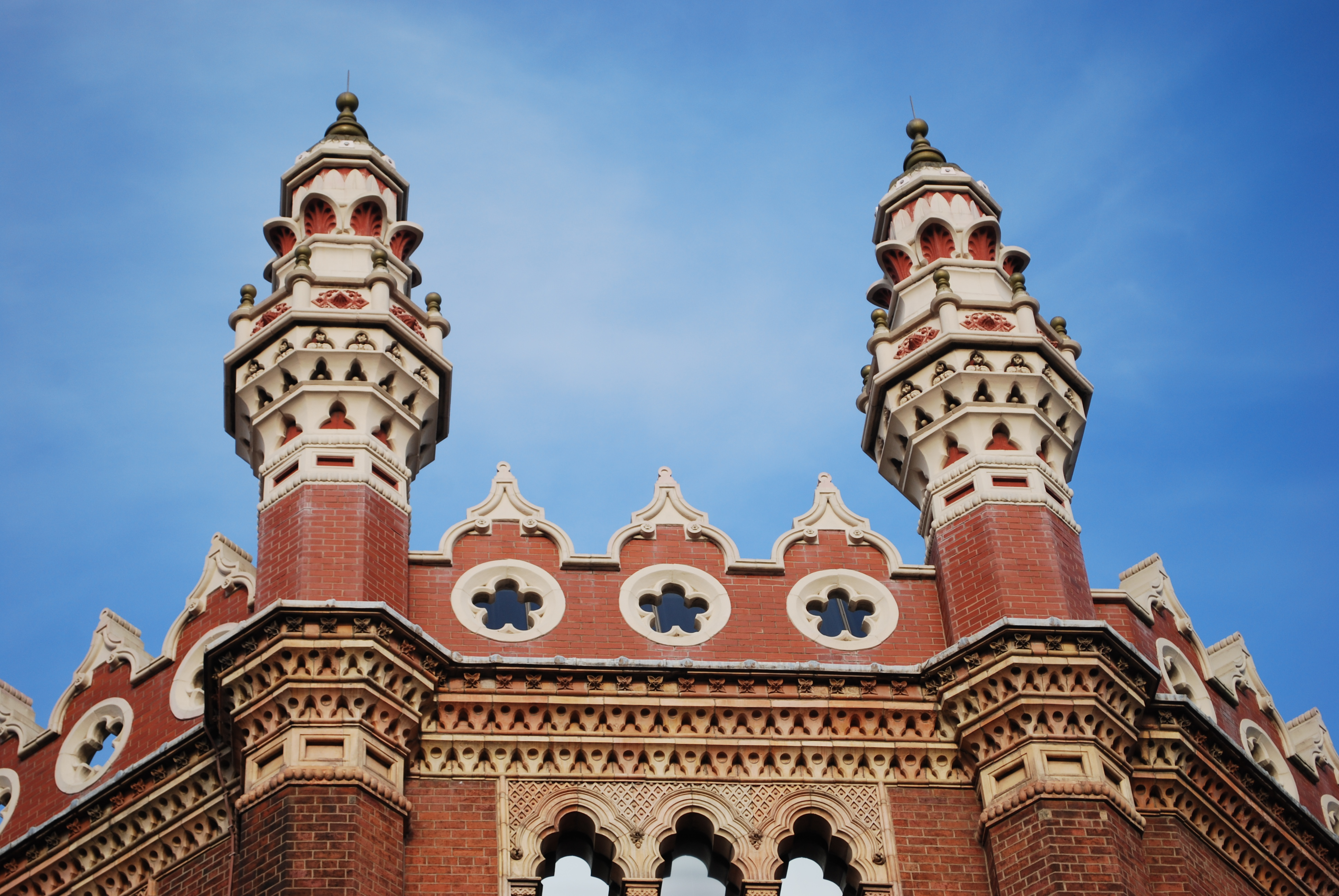
Minarets

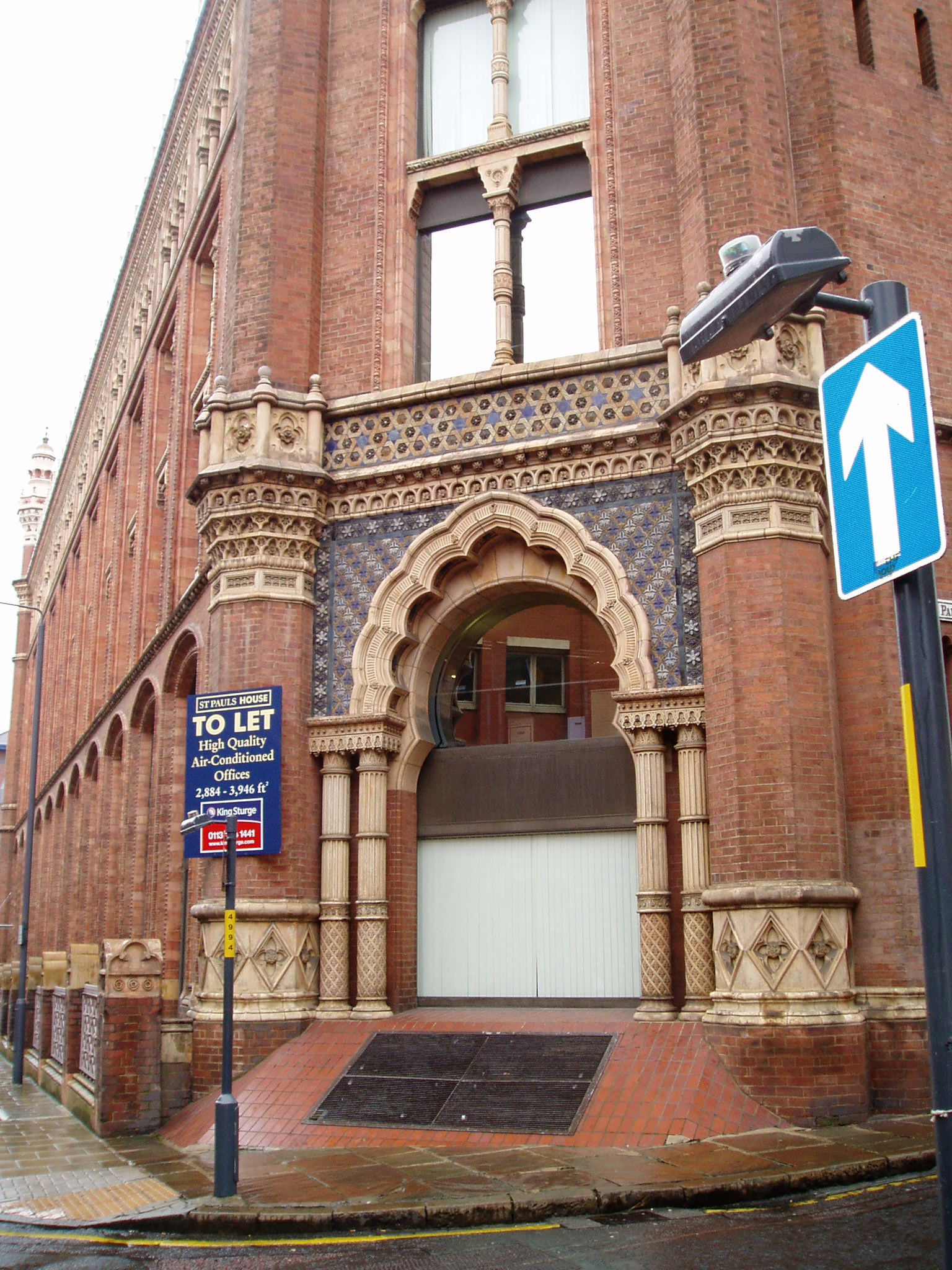
Original entrance from St Pauls Street

== See also ==
- Architecture of Leeds
- Grade II* listed buildings in Leeds
- Listed buildings in Leeds (City and Hunslet Ward - northern area)
