= Leeds Thomas Danby =

Former college in Leeds, England

Coordinates: 53.809325°N 1.532115°W

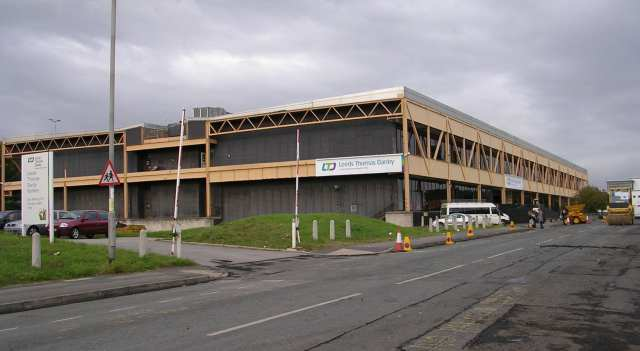
- Leeds Thomas Danby building
- Type: Further Education College
- Active: 1970–September 2013 (moved to the Printworks Campus)
- Location: Leeds, West Yorkshire, England
- Website: http://www.leedscitycollege.ac.uk/

Leeds Thomas Danby (formerly Thomas Danby College) was a further education college in Leeds, West Yorkshire, England offering courses for 16- to 18-year-olds and adults. The college was named after the first Mayor of Leeds, Captain Thomas Danby of Farnley. On 1 April 2009, Leeds Thomas Danby merged with Park Lane College and the Leeds College of Technology to form the new Leeds City College.

The Leeds Thomas Danby site, on Roundhay Road in Leeds, was known as the Thomas Danby Campus of the new college. The site was closed in September 2013 due to serious concerns regarding asbestos.

Leeds City College's new Printworks Campus, in Hunslet Road, opened in September 2013, replacing the Thomas Danby Campus.

It was demolished in 2018 and the site is now used for commercial purposes.

== Notable alumni ==
- Hasib Hussain, Islamic terrorist who detonated a bomb on a bus during the 7 July 2005 London bombings
