= Park Square, Leeds =

Garden square in Leeds, West Yorkshire, England

Coordinates: 53°47′56″N 1°33′07″W

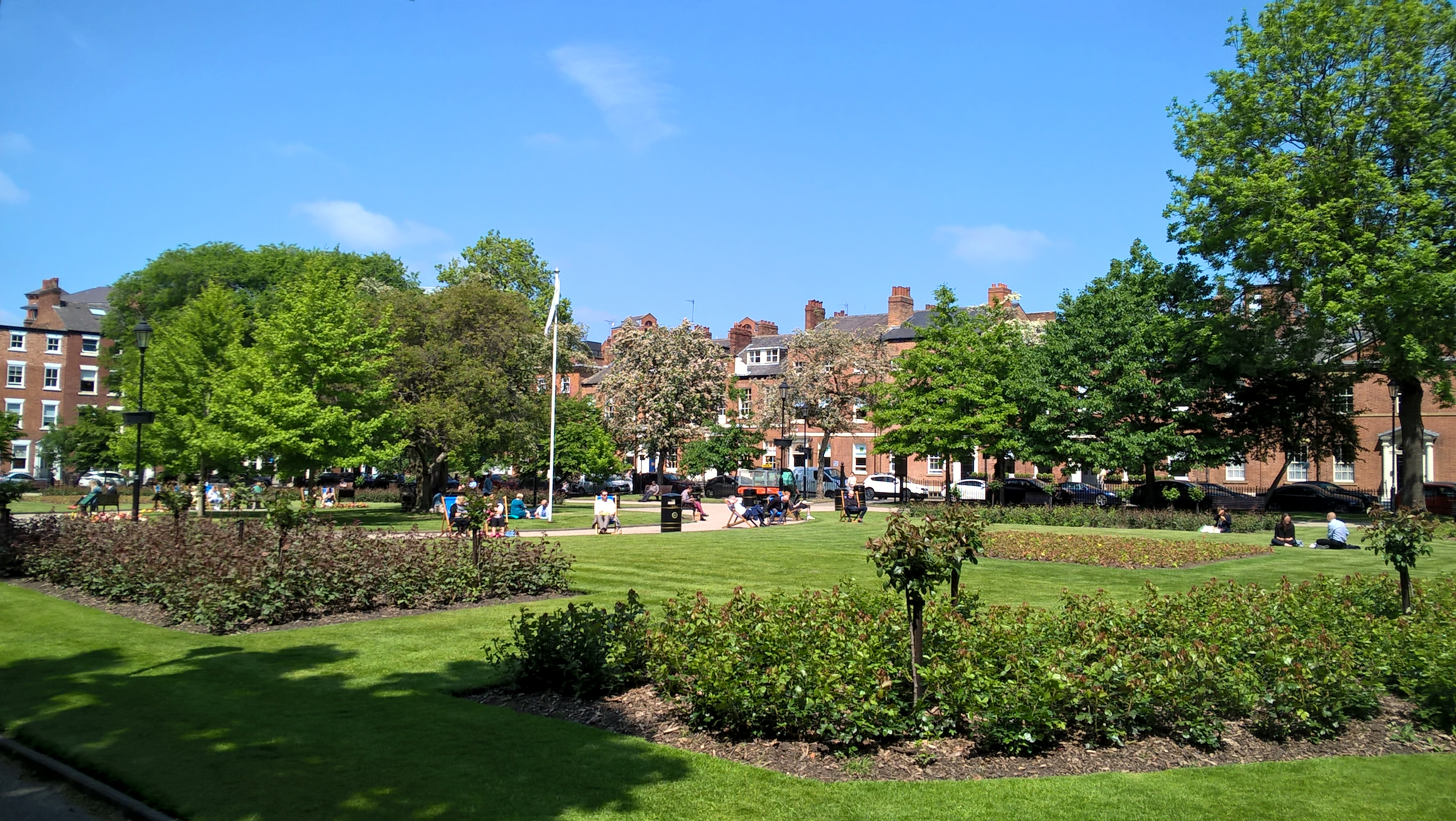
Park Square in May 2018

Park Square is a Georgian public square in central Leeds, West Yorkshire. The square is grassed over and is a traditional Georgian park. The square is in Leeds' financial quarter and is surrounded by Georgian buildings, which are occupied as offices, many by barristers and solicitors.

== History ==
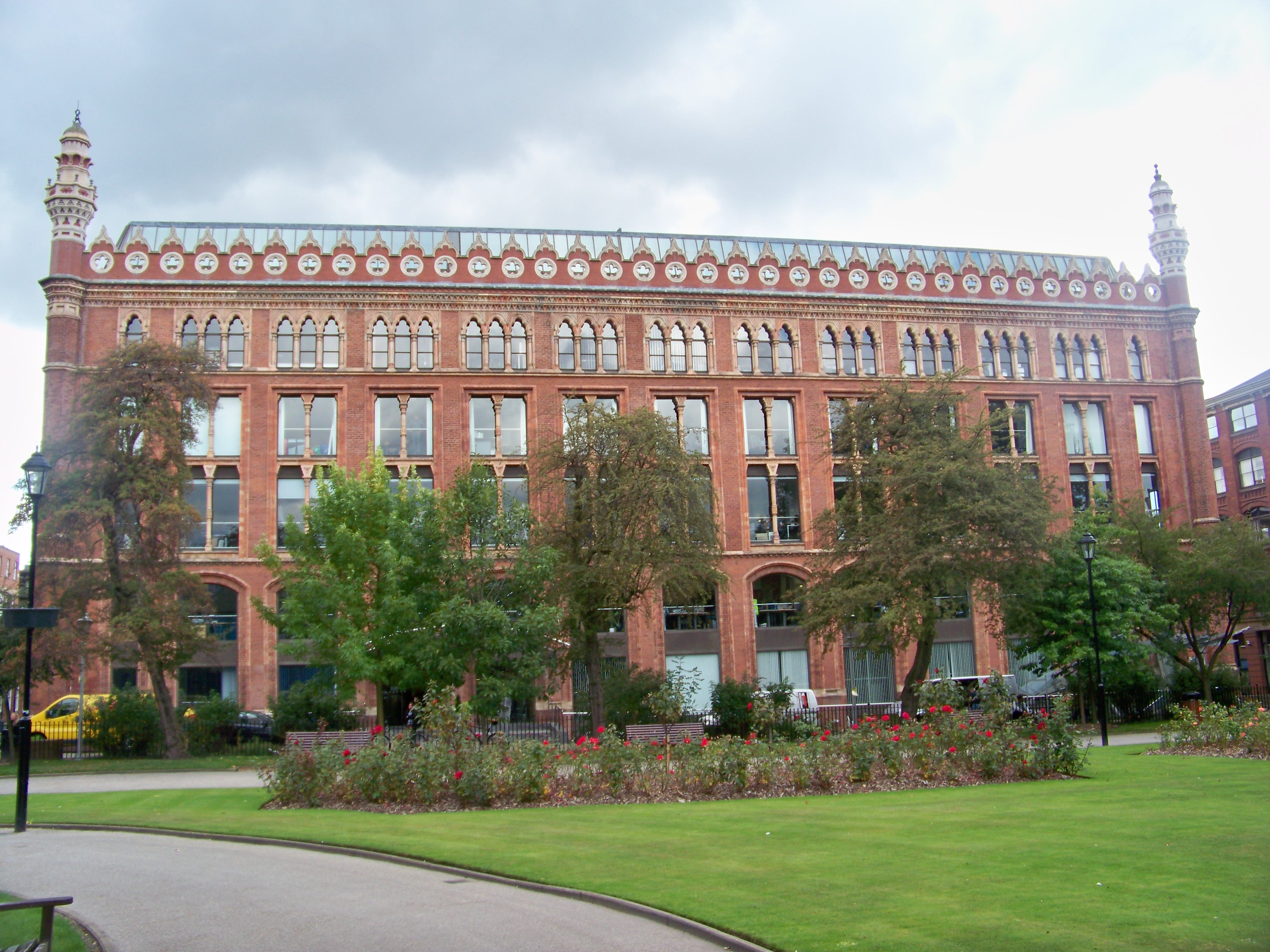
St Paul's House from the square

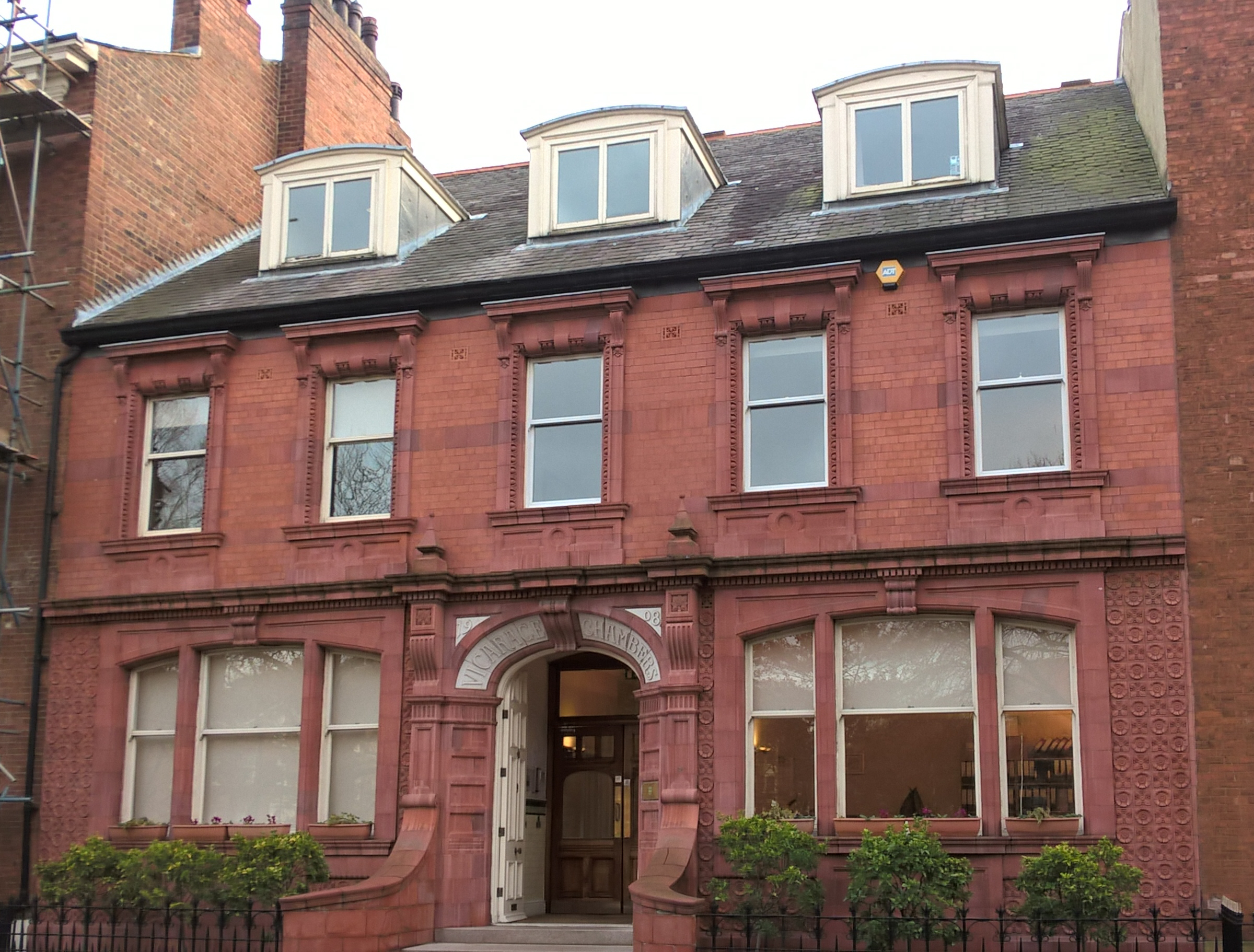
Vicarage Chambers

Park Square was part of a fashionable West End housing development, known as the Park Estates which was developed at the end of the eighteenth century for the upwardly mobile wealthy, to give them some distance from industry and the river, but within easy reach of the commercial centre. It was laid out from 1788, being completed in its original form in 1810 with houses 'well built in the modern tradition'. Somewhat grander dwellings were available in nearby Park Place. In naming the area, the word 'street' was avoided in favour of terms such as 'Row', 'Parade', 'Place' and 'Square', considered more prestigious, as had already been done in Georgian developments such as Bath, Bloomsbury and Bristol.

It featured a private garden square and a church, St Paul's, on the south side which offered exclusive pew and interment rights to the residents.

In 1865 the square was the scene of the Leeds dripping riot when one person died during protests about the imprisonment of a local woman for the theft of dripping from her employer at 8 Park Square.

However the initial aim of a purely residential area was not maintained when a large warehouse and cloth cutting works, St Paul's House, was built in 1878 for ready-made mass production tailor John Barran on St Paul's Street, with its rear aspect effectively taking up half the south side of the square. This was, however, in grand Arabic-Saracenic style by architect Thomas Ambler, and notable as the first planned and designed clothing factory. The building was modernised and converted to offices in 1977, with a new main entrance on Park Square South.

The other half of the south side of the square was taken up by St Paul's Church, (built 1793, demolished 1906). In 1938 Rivers House (21 Park Square South) was built on the site in Neo-Georgian style as offices for the Water Board. It is now private flats: Park Square Residences. Number 9, Park Square East is Vicarage Chambers, being on the site of the former vicarage of St Paul's Church.

For much of the 20th century a major feature was a bronze statue by Alfred Drury (1895) of Circe who changed the companions of Odysseus into swine, shown around her feet. This is also Grade II listed, but was moved to the Leeds Museum in 2008.

== Former residents ==
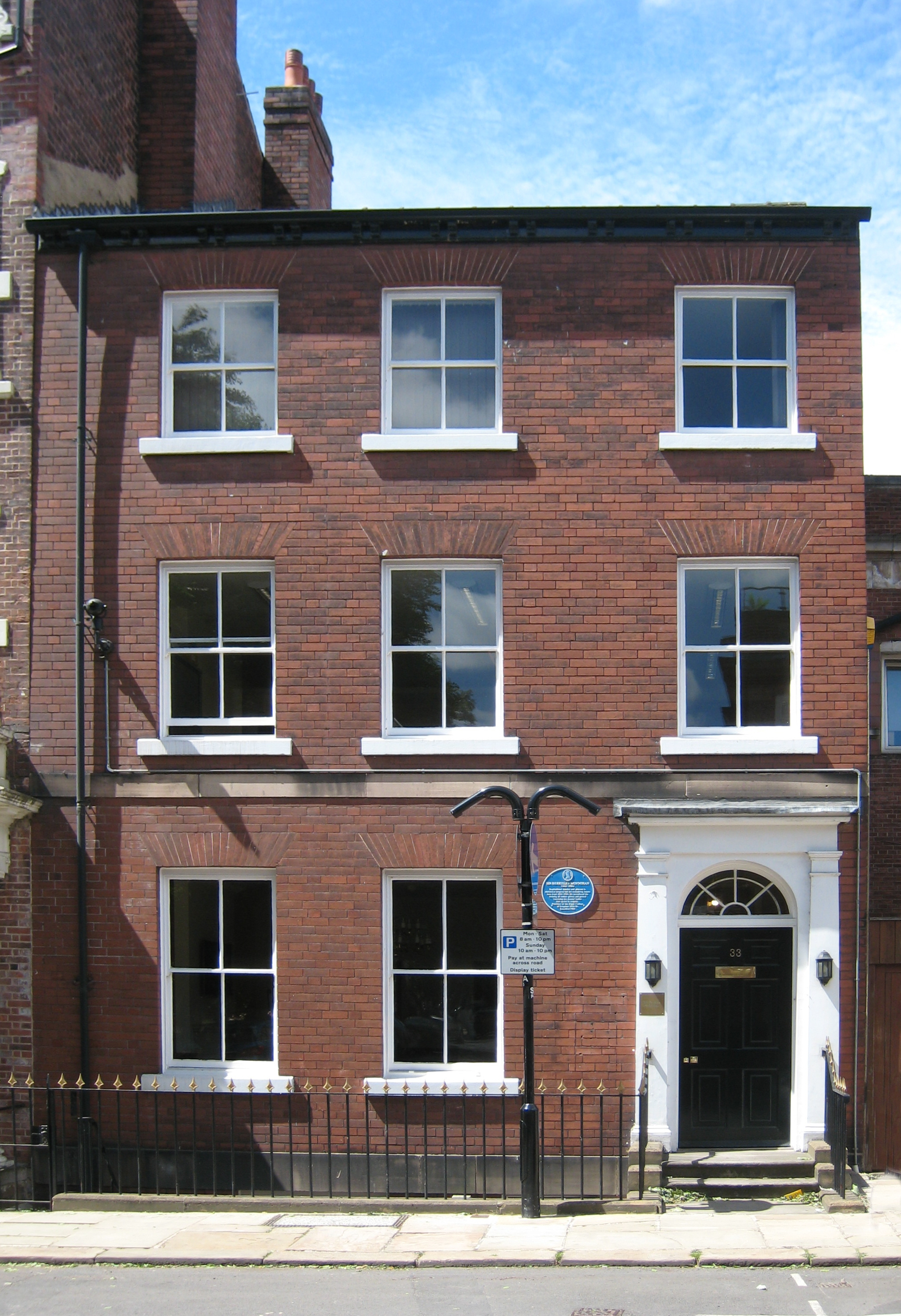
Sir Berkeley Moynihan's rooms with blue plaque

- Pioneering surgeon Berkeley Moynihan had his consultancy rooms on the square.
- Sir Clifford Allbutt, inventor of the clinical thermometer had his consulting rooms at number 35.
- After marrying in 1808, brewer Joshua Tetley settled in Park Square.
- Edith Pechey, one of the first women doctors in the United Kingdom and a campaigner for women's rights, opened her own practice at number 8, Park Square.

== Gallery ==
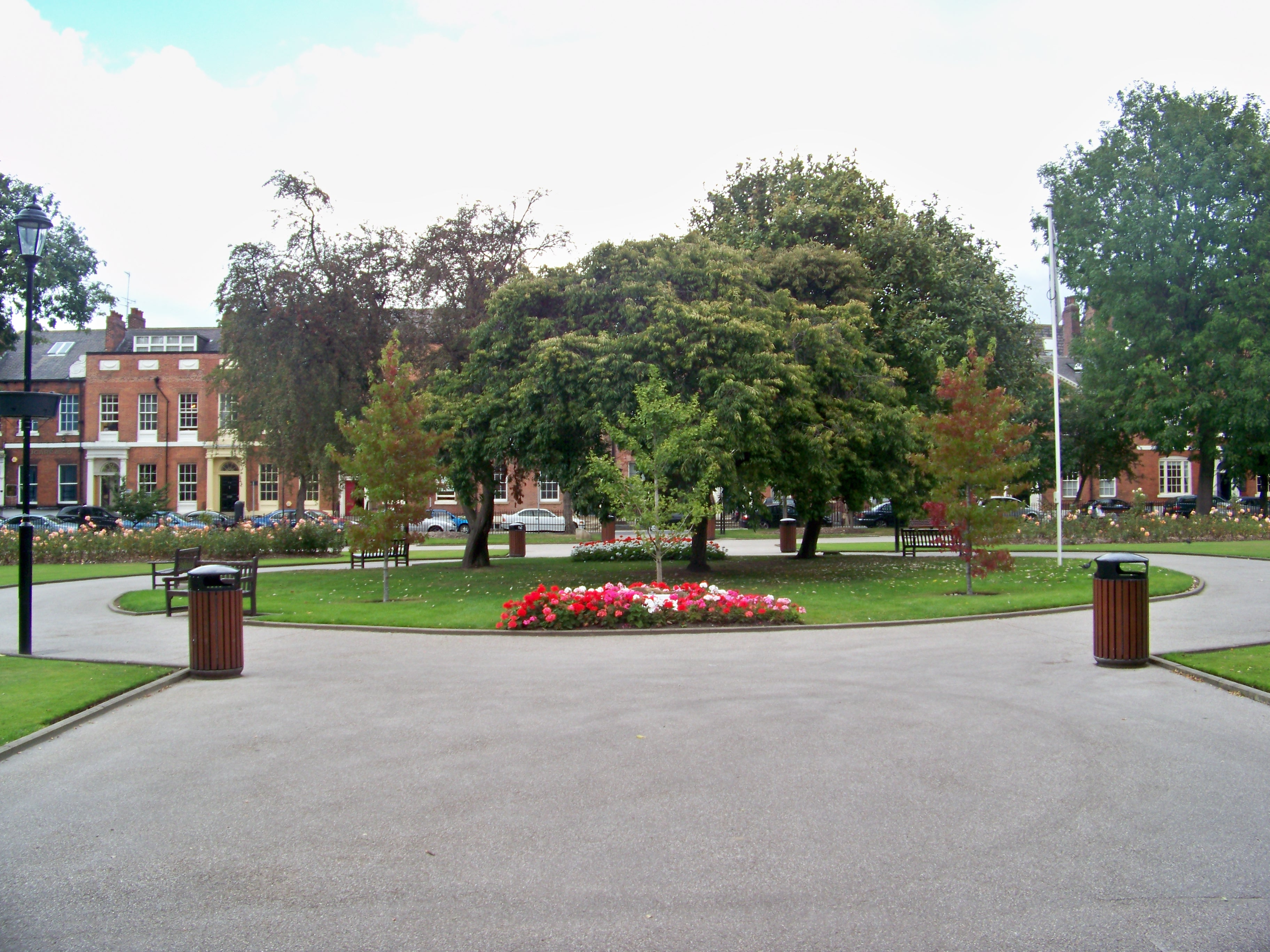
From the South

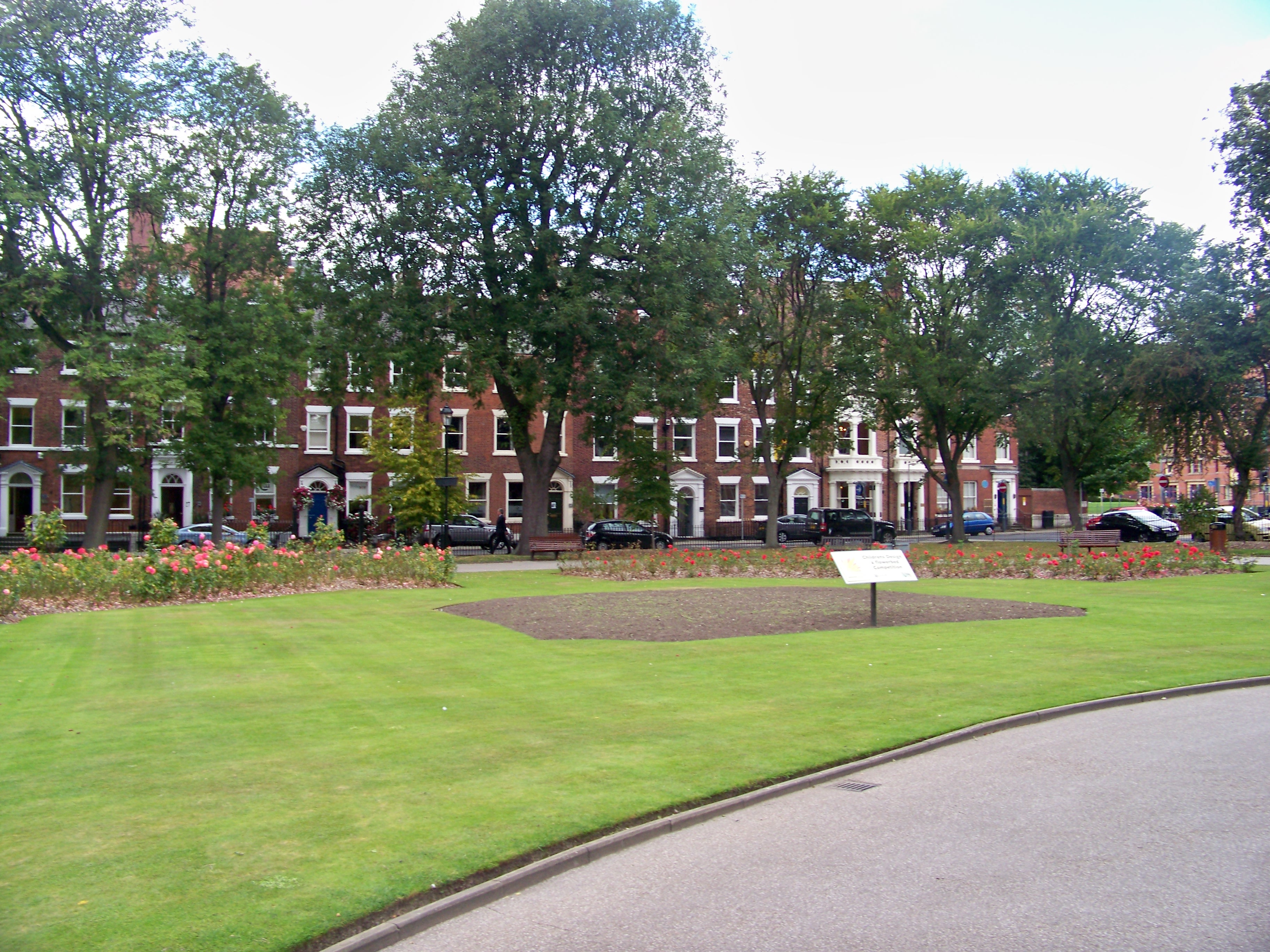
Looking westwards from the centre

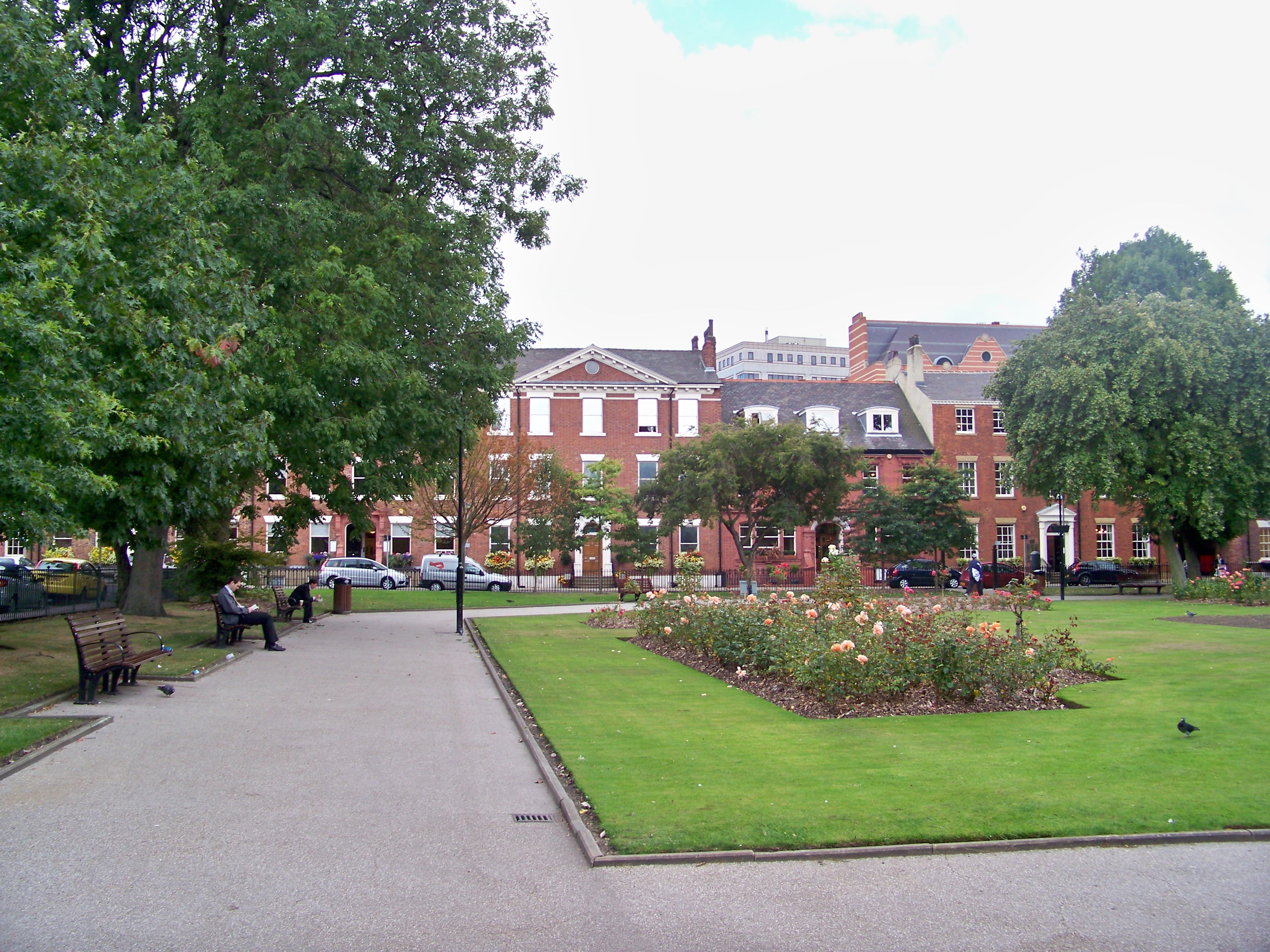
Looking east

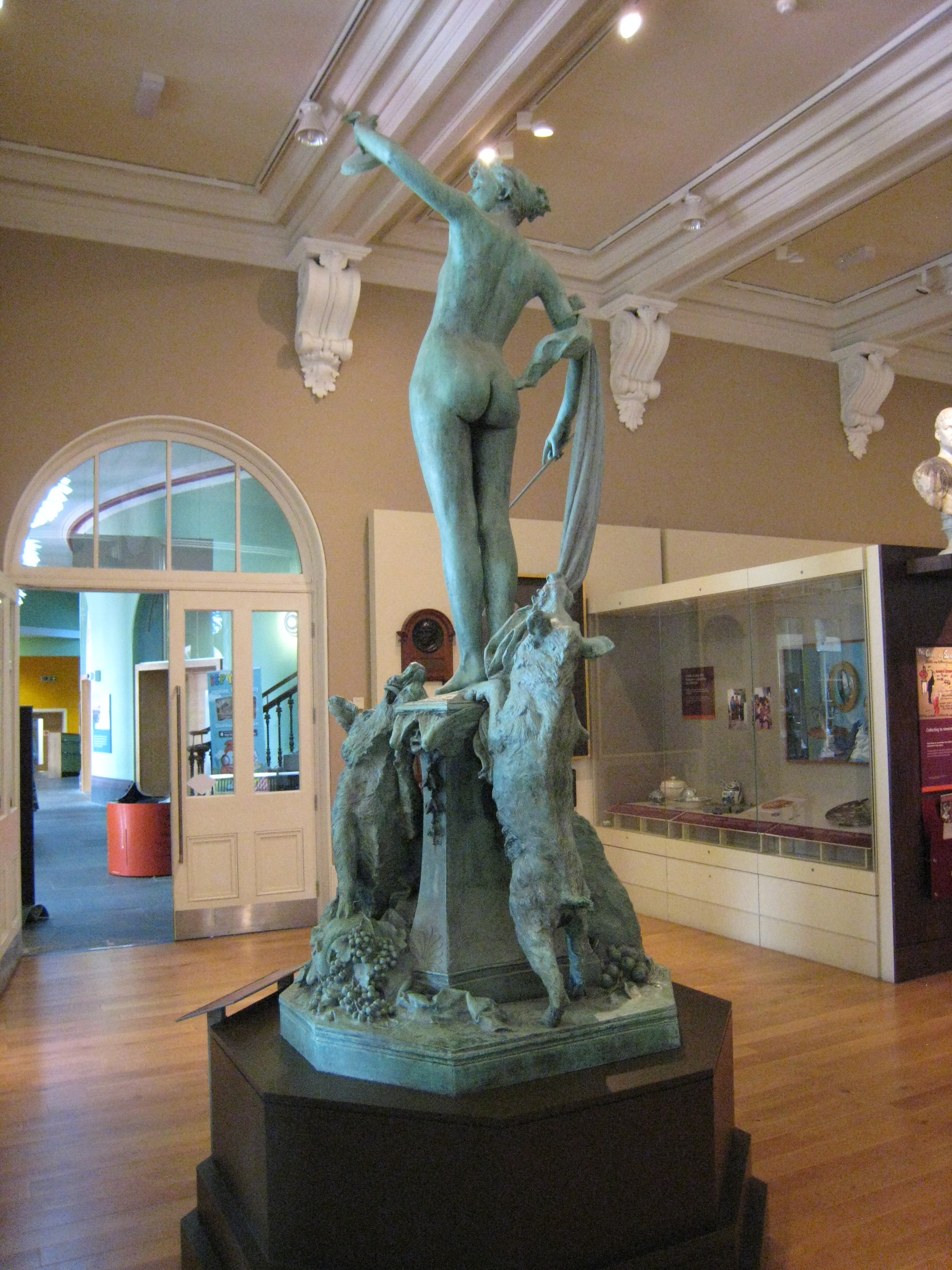
Statue of Circe and swine

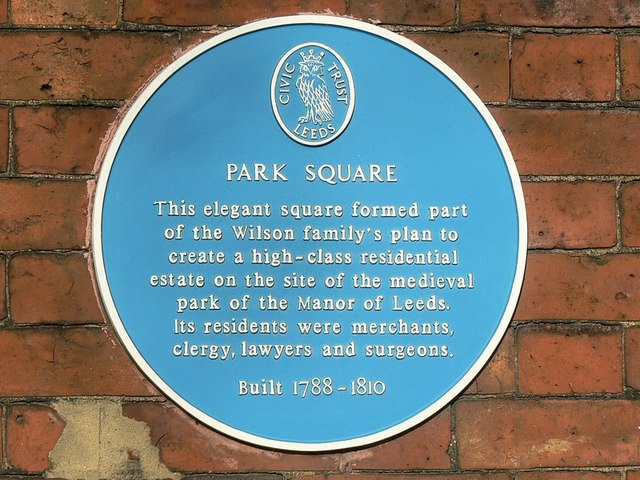
Blue Plaque
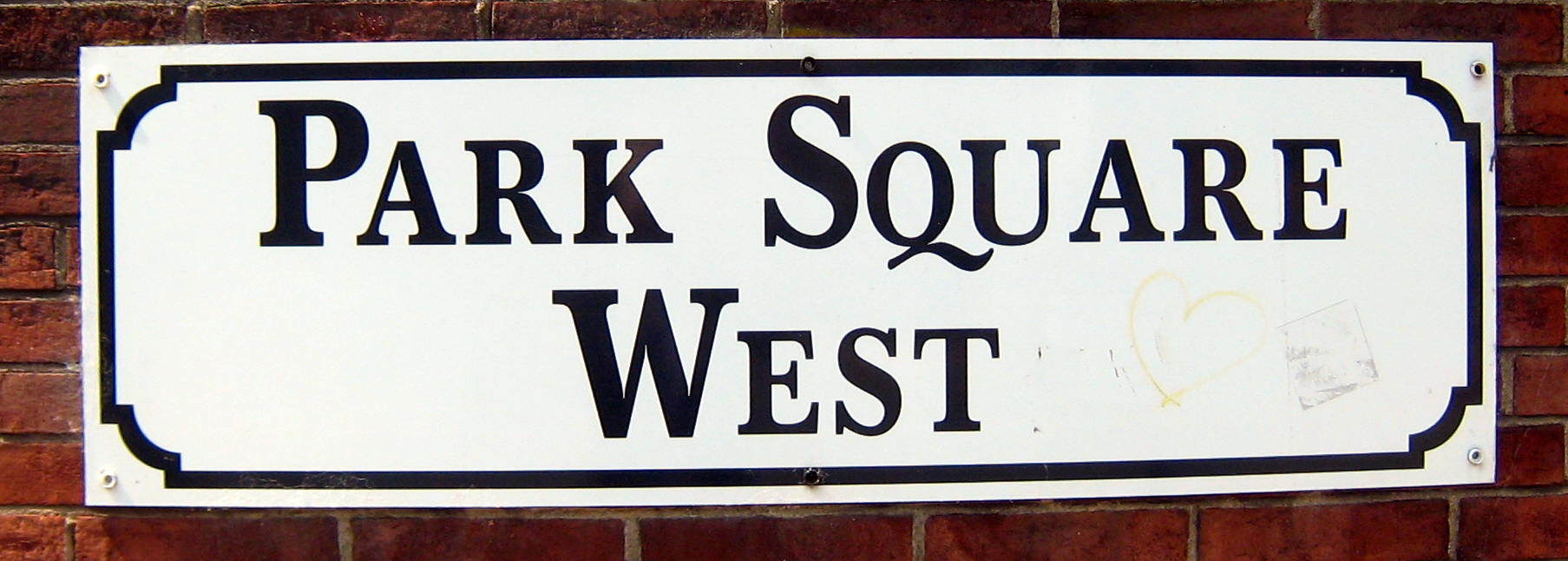
Street sign

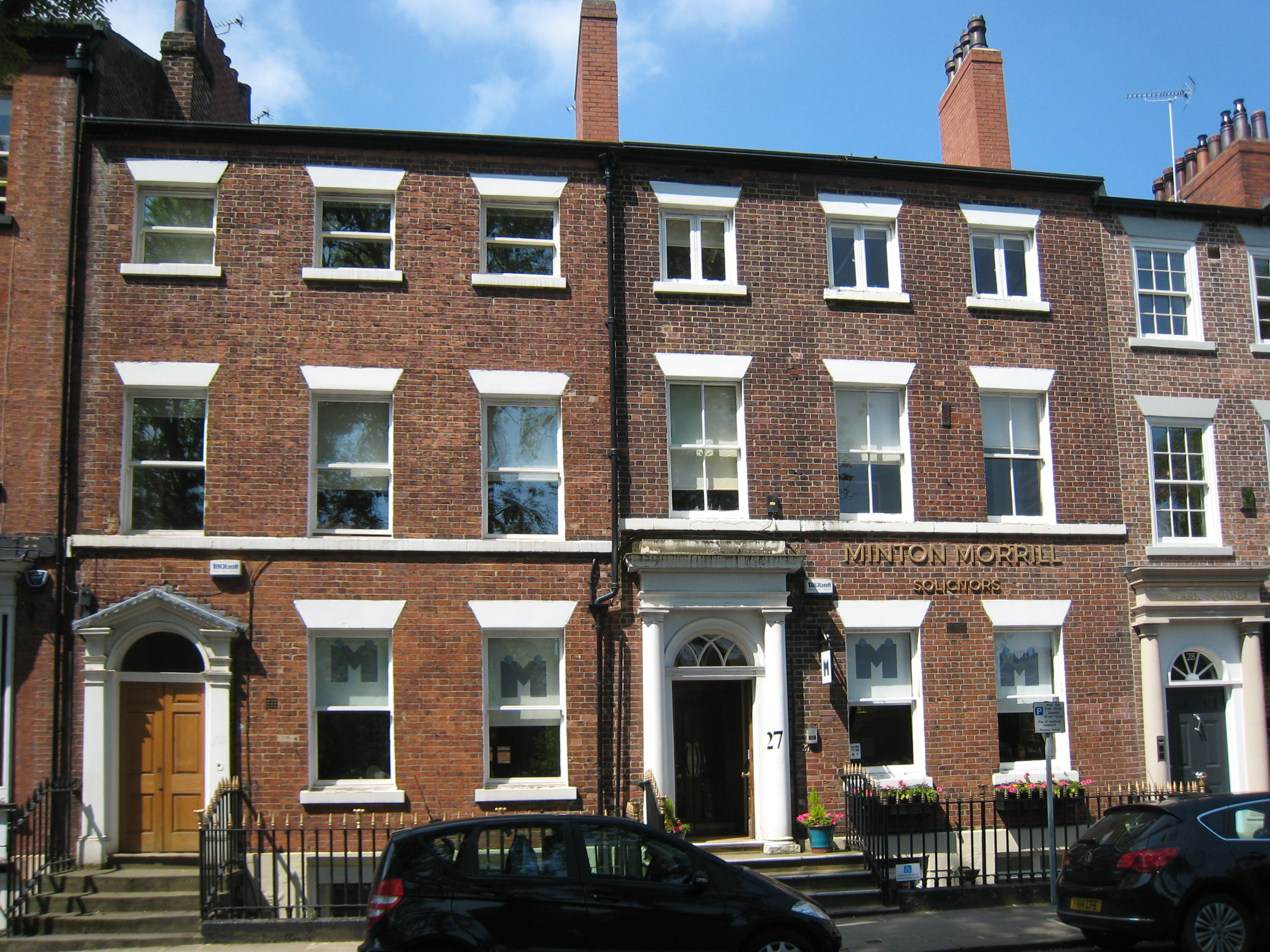
Houses on the west side

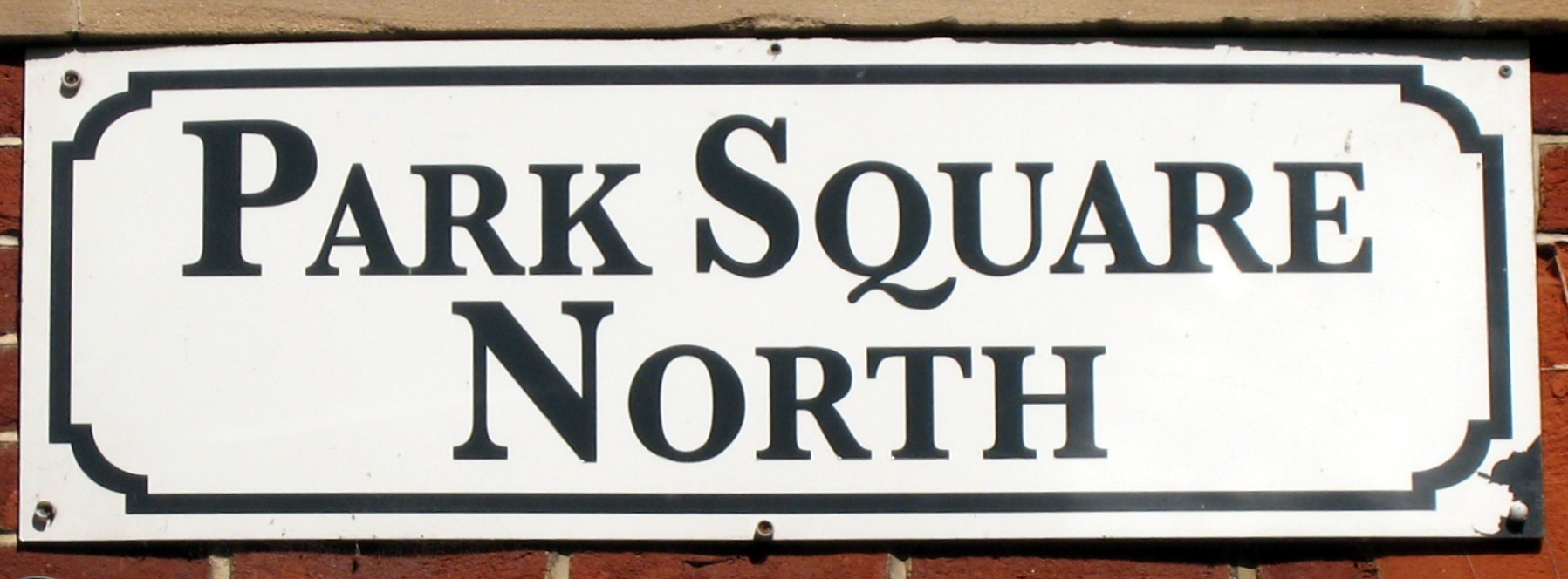
Street sign

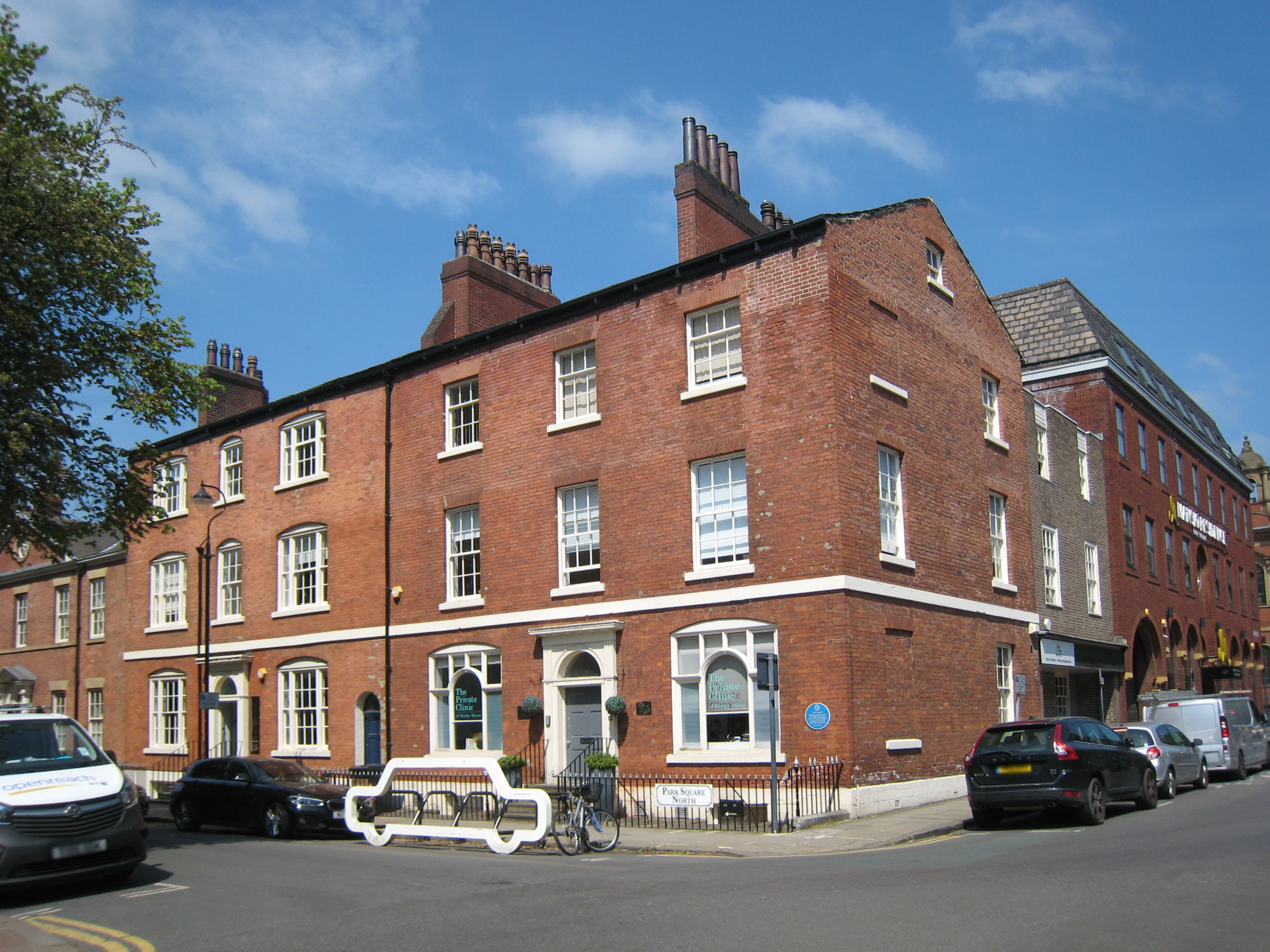
Park Square North with blue plaque

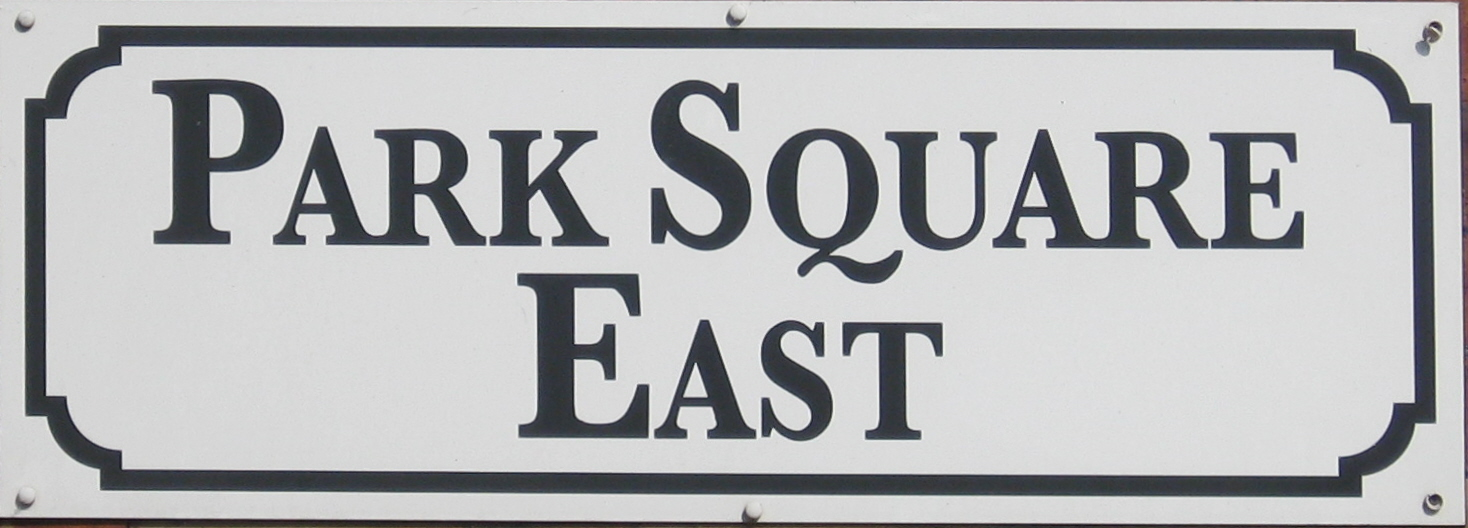
Street sign

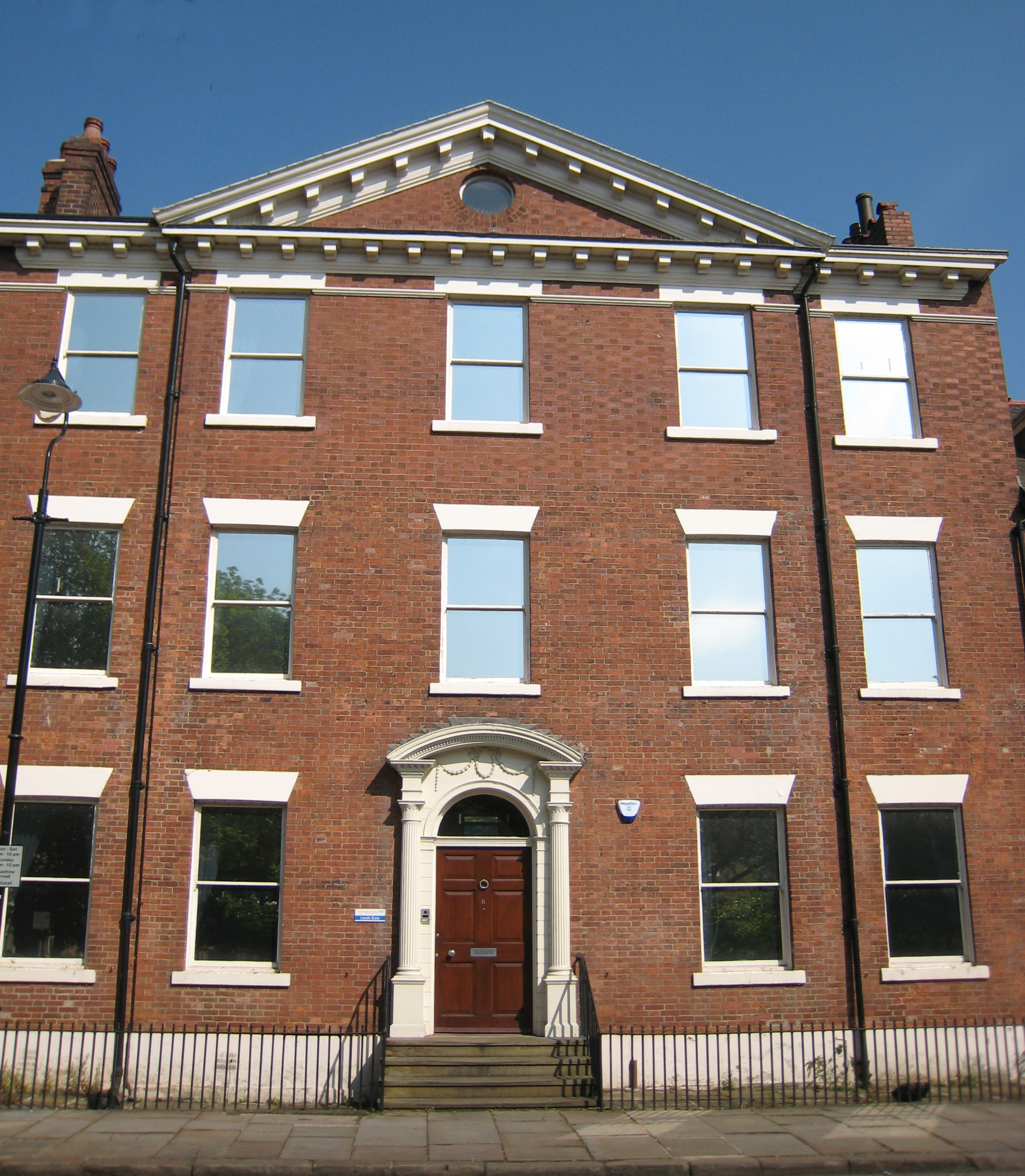
8 Park Square East

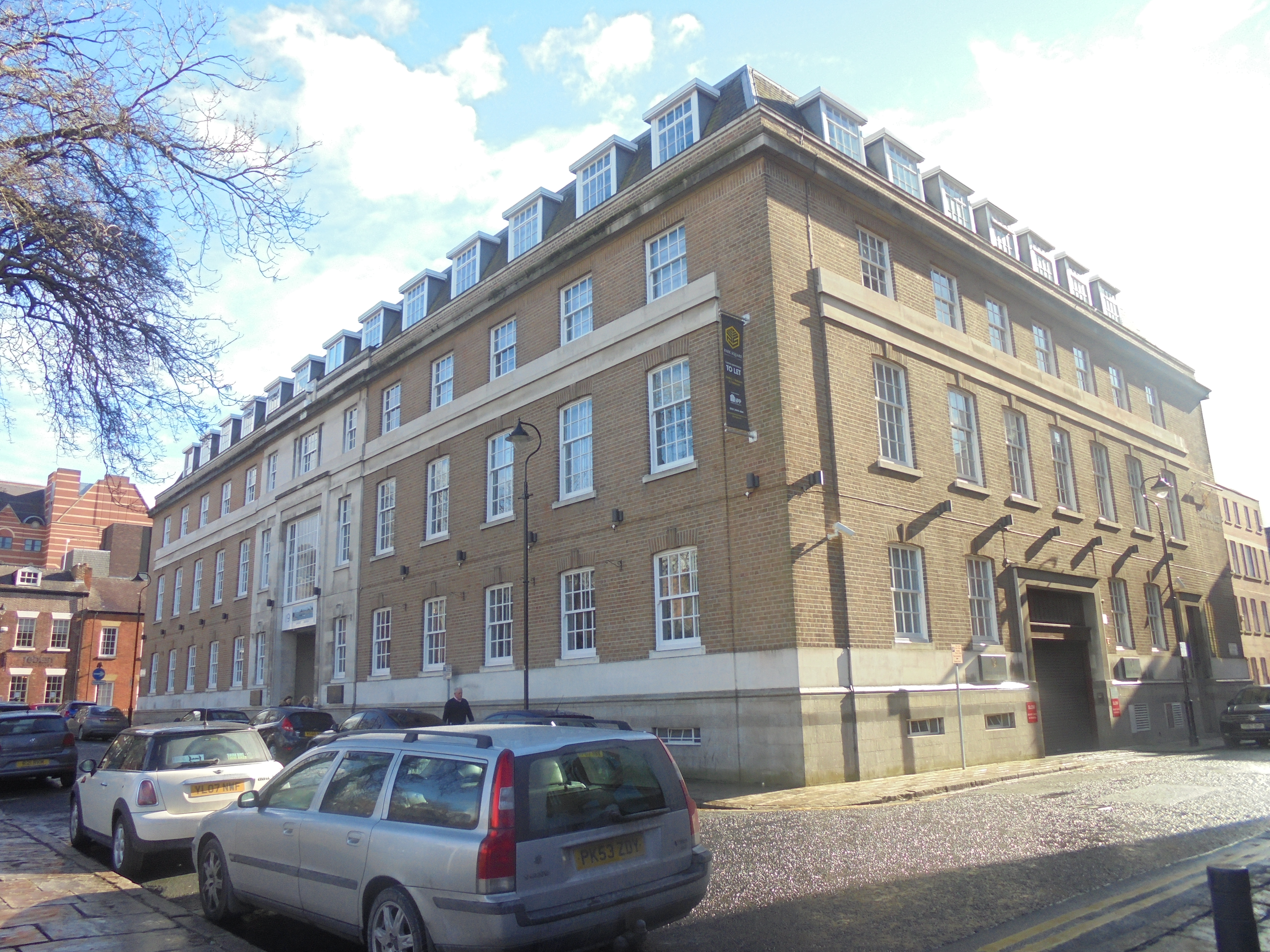
Rivers House

== See also ==
- City Square, Leeds
- Millennium Square, Leeds
- St Pauls House, Leeds
