= Joseph Priestley College =

Former further education college in Leeds

Location
- Beeston Campus; Burton Avenue, LS11 5ER; 53.7780°N 1.5412°W also Morley Campus; Peel Street, Morley, LS27 8QE; 53.7452°N 1.5970°W and Rothwell Campus; Marsh Street, Rothwell, LS26 0AE; 53.7475°N 1.4780°W; Leeds, West Yorkshire; England

Information
- Type: FE College
- Established: 1955
- Closed: 2011
- Website: https://web.archive.org/web/20060410080437/http://www.joseph-priestley.ac.uk/

Joseph Priestley College was a further education college founded in 1955 serving the communities of South Leeds, West Yorkshire, England. It was named after Joseph Priestley, a scientist and co-discoverer of oxygen who was born nearby. The college had three campuses, in Rothwell, Morley and Beeston.

In 2010, the college was seeking partners and a possible merger, to secure its future, due to national funding issues, in further education. Four years prior to this, news was reported about another college in the area, which suggested that the Joseph Priestley College may have been looking into the possibility of merging with other colleges in the region, for some time.

Following financial problems, a dissolution order was created by the government, and the college was merged with Leeds City College in August 2011. The merger aimed to improve educational opportunities and the provision of education for people in South Leeds.

In 2015, it was announced that the sites the college used to be based at, may be closed by Leeds City College, with a later report suggesting new houses may be built on the Morley site.

== Courses previously offered ==
The college offered a number of courses including:

- Public Services (Uniformed)
- Hairdressing
- Beauty Therapy
- Business
- Construction
- Horticulture
- IT Training
- Sport
- Basic Skills (English and Maths)
- IT Skills
- Childcare
- Health and Social Care
- Foundation studies (courses for adults with learning difficulties and disabilities)
- Access to Higher Education
- GCSEs (Mathematics and English)
- A wide range of full-time, part-time and flexible courses for adults.
- Courses for Businesses (including First Aid, Health and Safety, Management Training)

== See also ==
- Oulton Academy - Joseph Priestley College's Partnership School
- Leeds City College
