= Leeds City College =

Location
- Park Lane; Leeds, West Yorkshire, LS3 1AA; England; 53.801°N 1.558°W

Information
- Type: Further Education college
- Established: 1 April 2009 (merged)
- Department for Education URN: 135771 Tables
- Ofsted: Reports
- Principal & CEO: Colin Booth
- Gender: Mixed
- Age: 14+
- Enrollment: c26,000
- Campuses: Printworks Campus; Quarry Hill Campus; Park Lane Campus and community provision
- Website: leedscitycollege.ac.uk

Leeds City College is the largest further education establishment in the City of Leeds, West Yorkshire, England with around 26,000 students, 2,300 staff, with an annual turnover of £78 million. It officially opened on 1 April 2009. The College was granted official status in January 2009 and was formed from three large colleges, Park Lane College, Leeds Thomas Danby College and Leeds College of Technology.

On 1 August 2011 the college expanded further with the merger of the three sites of Joseph Priestley College in Rothwell, Beeston and Morley. On the same day it also became the owner of a newly re-constituted Leeds College of Music (now Leeds Conservatoire), which operates with a level of independence as a wholly owned company of the Leeds City College Group. The College offers a wide range of qualifications including A Levels, BTECs and other vocational qualifications. It offers industry standard qualifications in sectors such as Health and Social Care, Food and Catering and Hair and Beauty, amongst others.

In early 2019 the overarching body, Leeds City College Group, was renamed to Luminate Education Group to better reflect its increasing portfolio of institutions with Leeds City College becoming one of the members along with Leeds College of Music, Keighley College and the White Rose Academies.

== Sites ==
As of 2021 the college describes itself as operating from three principal sites: Printworks, Park Lane and Quarry Hill "with smaller provisions in communities across the city". Its registered office is in Park Lane, LS3 1AA, at the former Park Lane College site.

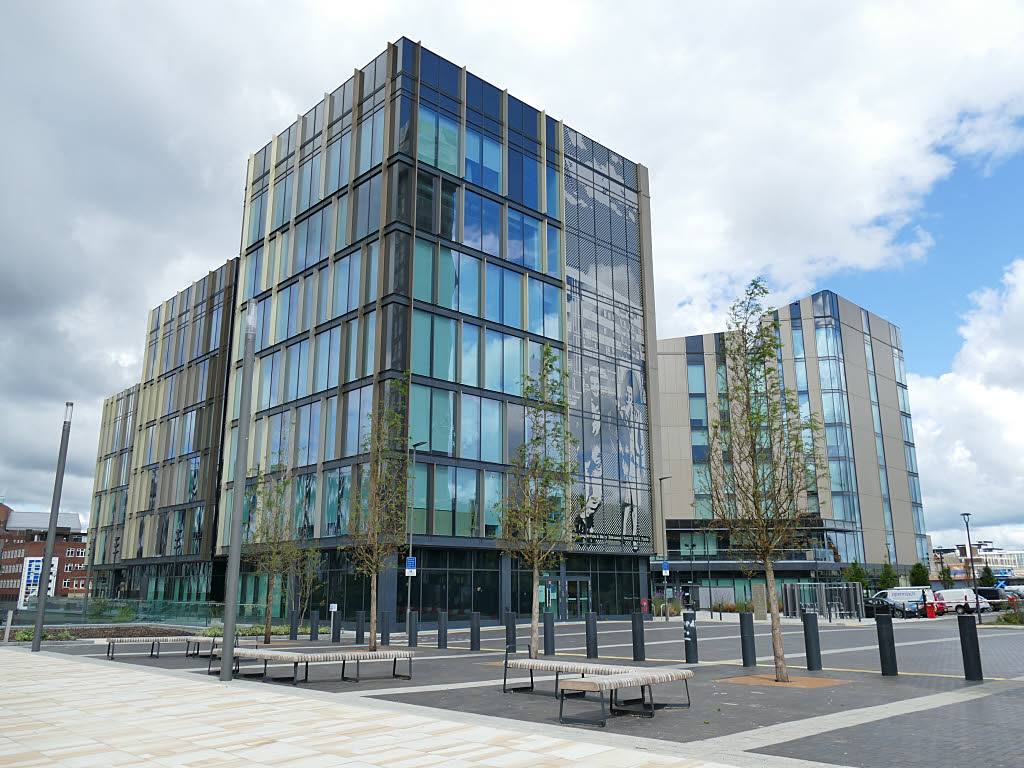
School of Creative Arts at the Quarry Hill campus.

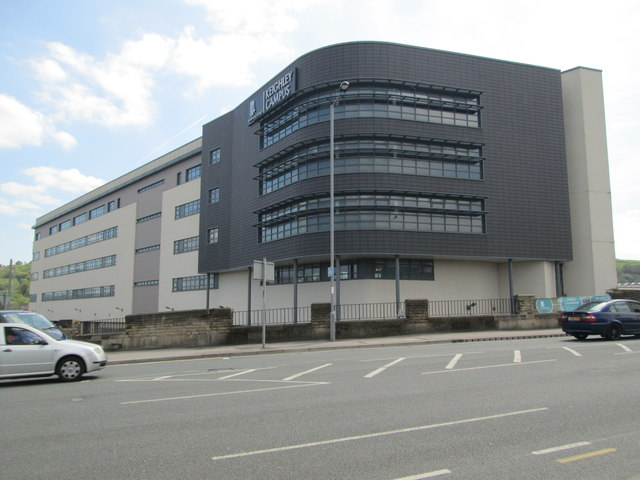
Keighley Campus

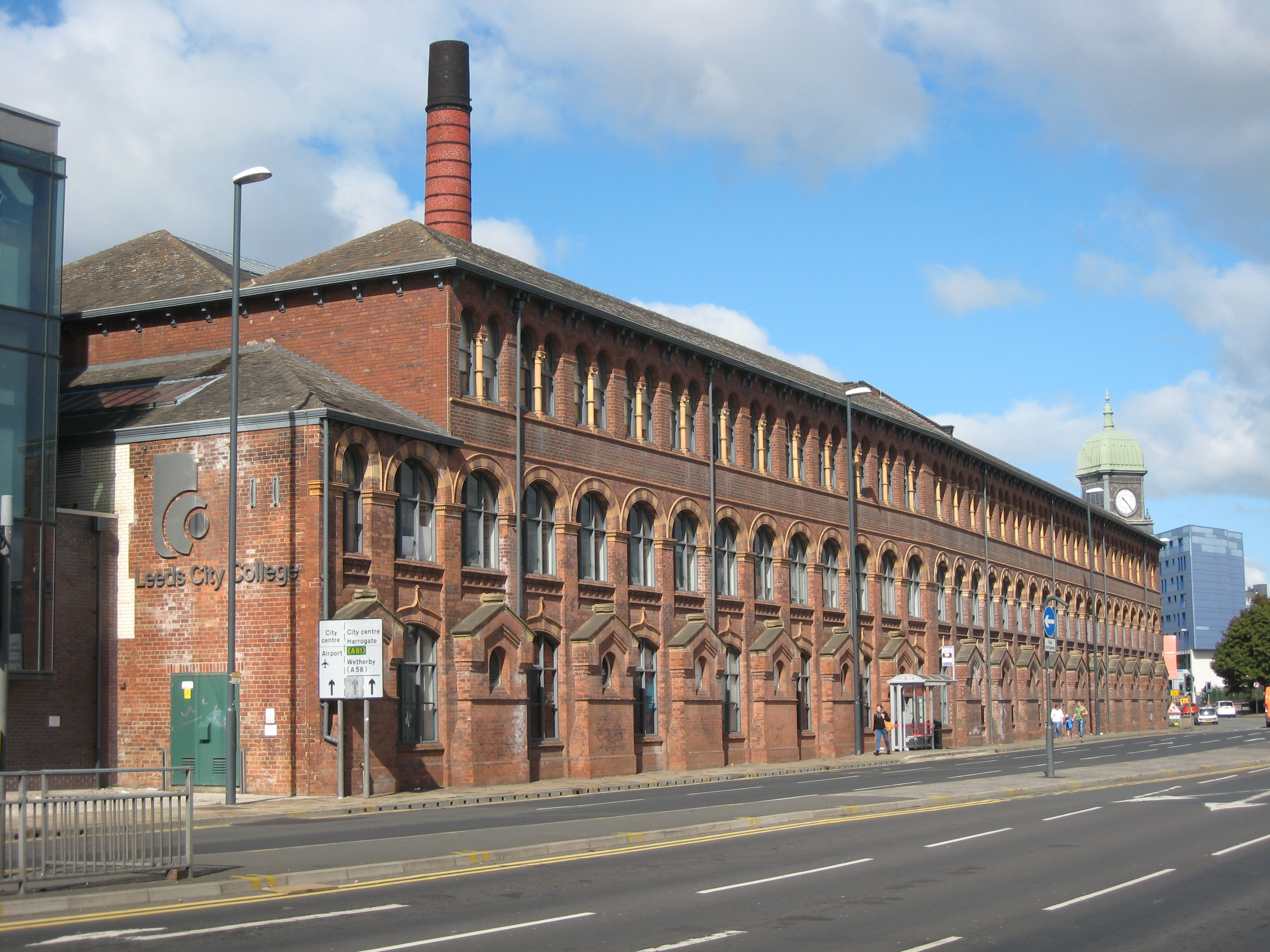
Printworks

The existing five sites of the three forming colleges continued in use, and were named as follows:

- Thomas Danby Campus, former Leeds Thomas Danby site, with specialist provision in catering and hospitality. This site was closed in September 2013 and activities relocated to the new Printworks Campus.
- Technology Campus, former Leeds College of Technology site with specialist provision in electrical and engineering crafts and computing, closed July 2019. It had been home to the Health, Social Care, Childcare and Public Services courses. The site is now demolished.
- Park Lane Campus, former Park Lane College Leeds site, with specialist provision in business training courses. In 2016 it was announced the creative arts block would close in 2019. In 2019 the Creative Arts block, along with the whole of the Technology Campus closed and courses moved to a brand new site on Quarry Hill.
- Horsforth Campus, former Park Lane College Horsforth site (closed June 2017, demolished 2022)
- Keighley Campus, former Park Lane College Keighley site and now known as Keighley College, with specialist provision in trade/construction programmes

In September 2011 a new site was opened after a college merger:

- Joseph Priestley Campus, former Joseph Priestley College Morley site, with sites also in Rothwell and Beeston.

In September 2013 a new site was opened:

- Printworks Campus, in Hunslet Road, Leeds, incorporating the Grade II listed print halls of the former Alf Cooke printworks and purpose-built new buildings, with an additional classroom block opened on 28 April 2023.

The college also initially operated from 12 other centres in Leeds; of these only Deacon House (Seacroft), Enfield Centre and Joseph Priestley Campus, Beeston remain in use. Enfield Centre provision has since moved to Mabgate Campus in the historic Mabgate area.

In September 2019 a new site opened at Quarry Hill Campus. This new site was estimated to cost £60 million and is home to the School of Creative Arts, the School of Social Science, higher education provision in the creative arts and some space allocated to Leeds College of Music. Quarry Hill Annexe is located close by in Bridge Street and additional provision is available nearby in Eastgate. The sculpture Ribbons by Pippa Hale is located here, as the college was a partner in the project.

The Vine is a college site providing education for students with Profound and Multiple Learning Disabilities (PMLD). It opened in September 2023 in Burmantofts, replacing an earlier facility in Headingley. It includes a hydrotherapy pool and it caters for learners with PMLD and learners aged up to 25 with an Education and Health Care Plan.

The former Livingstone House, at Leeds Dock, a former Yorkshire Water property, was acquired in 2026 for redevelopment as a new health and social care campus. This site, referred to as "Leeds Dock campus", was officially opened on 4 November 2026.

== 2009 merger ==
=== Rationale ===
The decision to merge the three colleges was agreed by the three institutions involved with the joint aim being:

"...to raise achievement levels in Leeds and Keighley, offer more courses to suit the needs of everyone from school leavers to employers, and enhance our facilities to be amongst the best in the country."

With the three colleges offering many similar courses, one of the major advantages of having a unified education institution in the city is that duplication of courses is eliminated and the provision of centralised services to learners.

=== Timeline ===
According to the Leeds College Merger website, the Secretary of State gave official approval of the merger in January 2009 with the three colleges being dissolved on 31 March 2009. From 1 April 2009, Leeds City College would come into force with a new identity and from then on, publicity campaigns would run to extend the awareness of the new college. New students were enrolled to the new Leeds City College from September 2009.

=== Funding ===
It was assumed that the primary funding body for Further Education in England, the Learning and Skills Council (LSC), had ring-fenced a capital grant to help fund the merger. Although no actual figure was published, an article in the Yorkshire Evening Post in December 2006 spoke of up to £200 million being made available.

However, news hit the headlines in spring 2009 of a serious and unexpected financial deficit within the LSC's national Building Colleges for the Future program, from where the grant would normally have been allocated. This has cast doubts on how just how much money (if any) will be made available for this merger, and when it would be released.

== See also ==
- Park Lane College Leeds
- Leeds Thomas Danby
- Leeds College of Technology
- Joseph Priestley College
