= Park Lane College Leeds =

Former college in Leeds, England

Coordinates: 53.799°N 1.560°W

- Type: Further Education College
- Active: 1966–2009 (As Park Lane College); 1 April 2009–present (as Leeds City College)
- Location: Leeds, West Yorkshire, England
- Website: http://www.leedscitycollege.ac.uk/

Park Lane College Leeds was the largest further education college in Leeds, West Yorkshire, England, and provided further, higher and adult education to over 45,000 students. It operated out of over 40 sites across Leeds. On 1 April 2009 Park Lane College merged with Leeds Thomas Danby and the Leeds College of Technology to form the new Leeds City College. The three main Park Lane sites are now known as the Park Lane Campus, Horsforth Campus and Keighley Campus of the new college.

== History ==
Park Lane College was established in 1966, to provide commercial, secretarial and general education for the citizens of Leeds. In 1992, the College was incorporated and inherited control of the local education authority's dispersed, community-based provision. In 1998, it merged with Airedale and Wharfedale College, which became the Park Lane College Leeds Horsforth Centre.

On 1 August 2007, Park Lane College Leeds merged with Keighley College to form Park Lane College Leeds & Keighley taking the total number of students to approximately 45,000.

== Sites ==
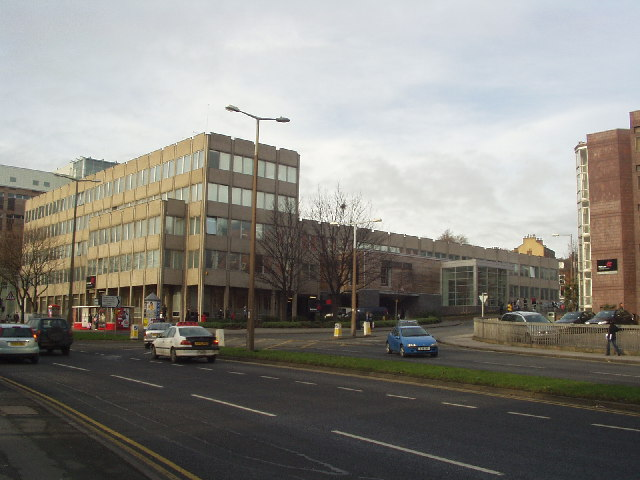
Leeds City Centre site (now Park Lane campus of Leeds City College)

Park Lane College had three main campuses in the Leeds City Centre, Horsforth and Keighley, and operated out of over 40 other sites across Leeds.

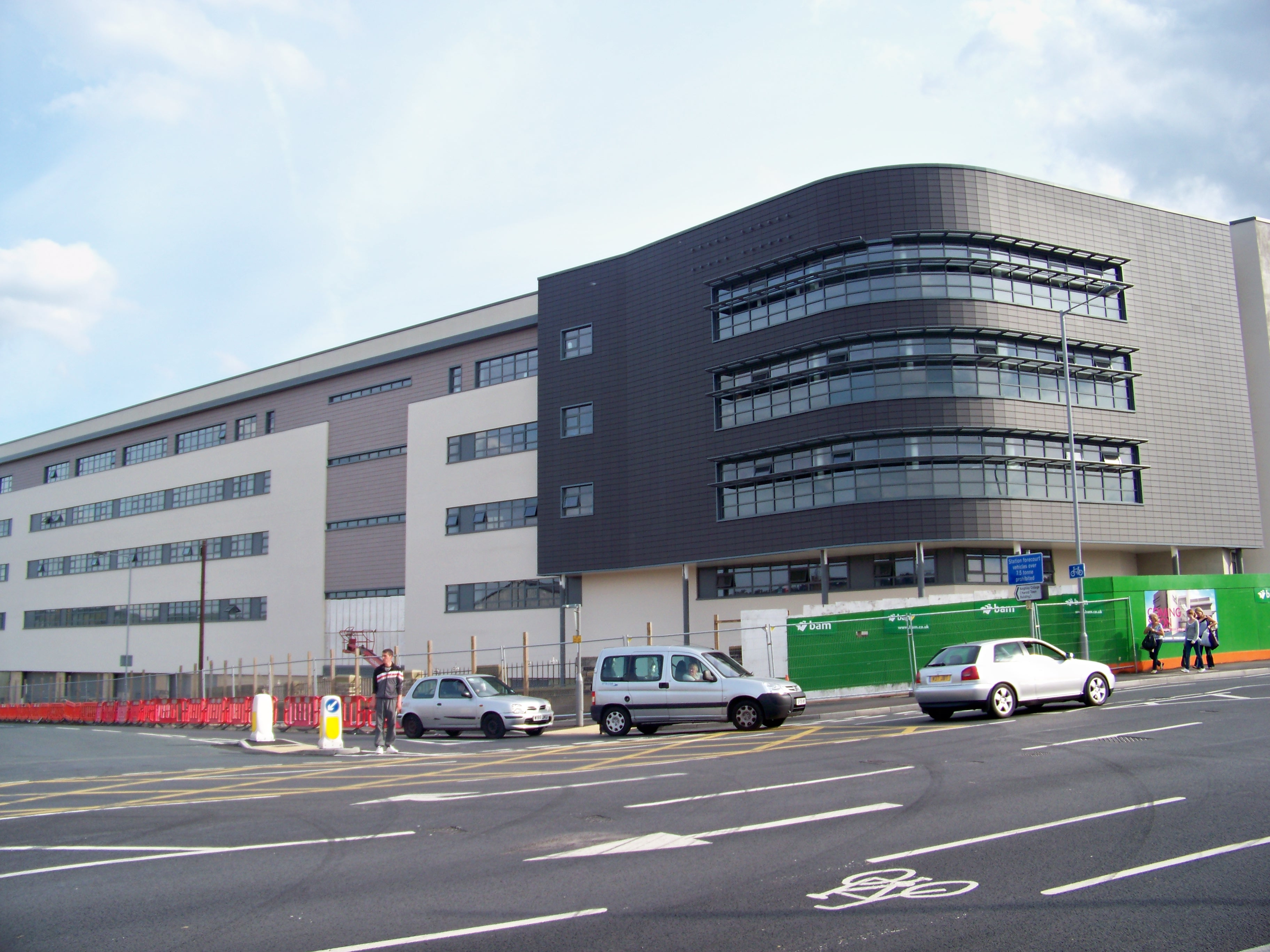
Park Lane College, Keighley, new buildings.

In September 2004, Park Lane opened a new 7 storey extension at the City Centre Site. The award-winning design has an environmental focus and created an additional 60 classrooms on the College's main site. The College also launched a number of other new facilities and departments including the Creative Arts Academy, Hair & Beauty Therapy, the Animal Centre, and the PLCL Business School; it continued this trend with a new School for Entrepreneurship, Financial Services Skills Academy, and Construction provision although the latter has subsequently been closed down.

== Figures ==
The College budget totalled over £43 million. The total number of students at Park Lane was approximately 45,000 for the academic year 2006/7. Partnerships and community organisations enabled the College to meet the needs of socially excluded and other disadvantaged groups. Extensive basic skills provision formed a key element in the College's response to social inclusion.

The College signed a ‘Memorandum of Understanding’ with Leeds Metropolitan University in November 2004, and after this time developed over 21 foundation degrees in subjects such as Animal Health & Welfare, Contemporary Music Production and e-Technology.

== Employers and business ==
Park Lane met regularly with employers from industries covered by courses and had links with over 2,500 companies. Relationships included Leeds Rugby, Bradford City, Radio Aire, the Halifax, Asda, and the Yorkshire Post Newspapers.
