= Shire Oak (Headingley) =

Ancient tree in England

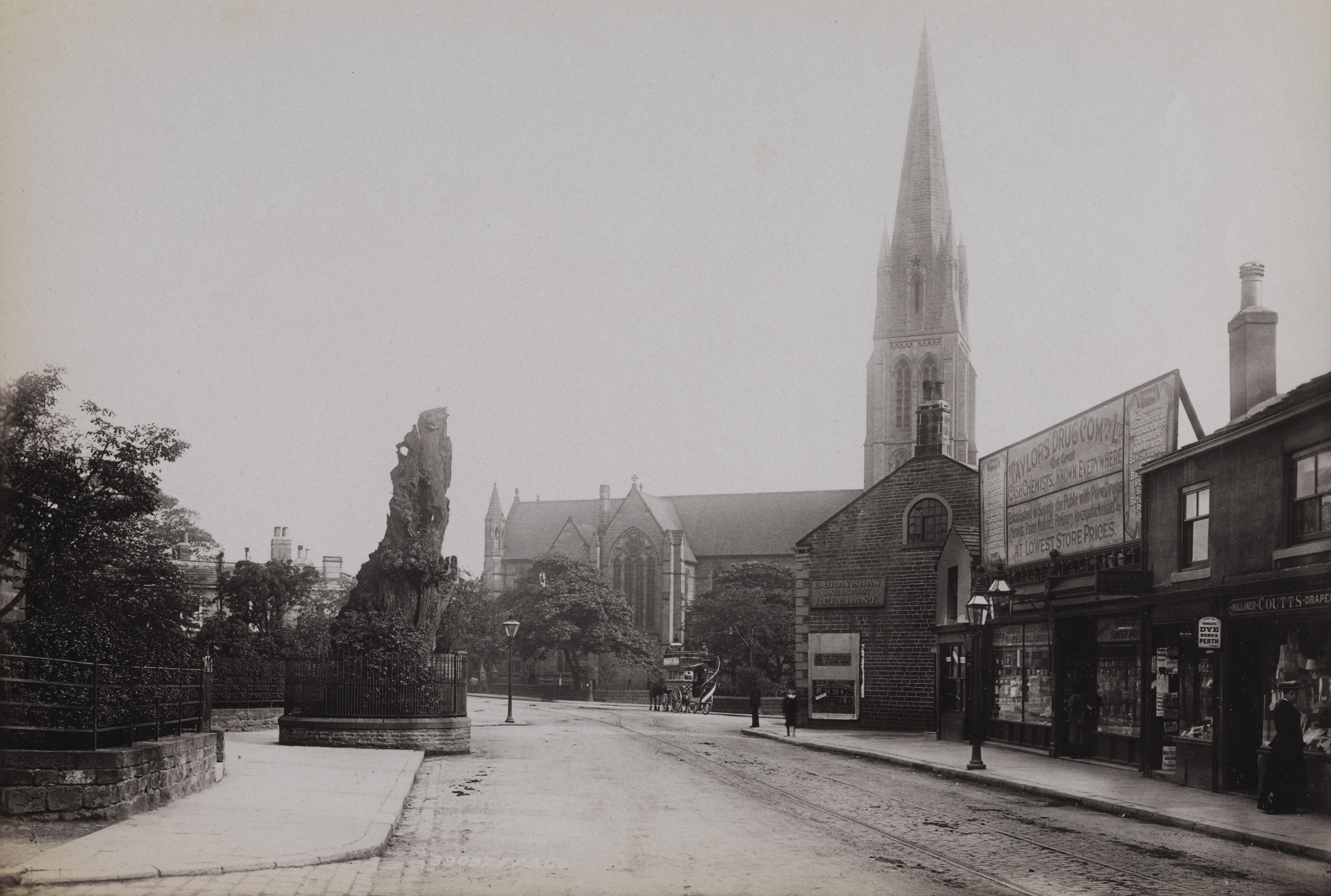
- The Shire Oak photographed in front of St Michael's Church in 1897
- Interactive map of Shire Oak
- Location: Headingley, West Yorkshire
- Coordinates: 53.8199°N 1.5762°W
- Date felled: 26 May 1941

The Shire Oak was an ancient tree that stood in Headingley, now a suburb of the city of Leeds. It is thought to date from the time of the Danelaw in 9th-century England and is a shire oak, a tree that was used as a meeting point for local assemblies. The wapentake (Danish local assembly) in this area was known as the Skyrack wapentake after the tree. The Shire Oak was felled by winds in 1941 and a plaque now marks the place in which it once stood.

== History ==
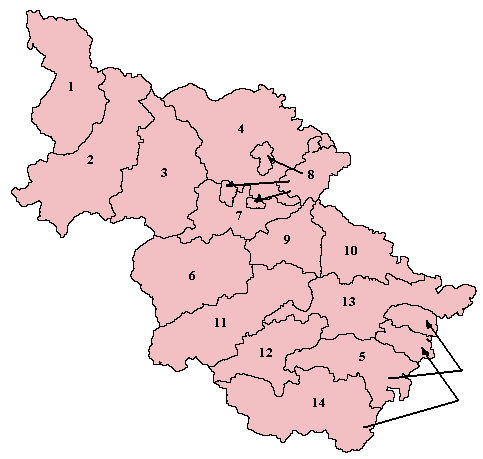
The Skyrack wapentake is formed of the divisions marked 7 and 9 on this map of the West Riding of Yorkshire

Headingley has its origins in a Danish settlement established in the late 9th century, that formed part of the Danelaw. The settlement formed part of the Skyrack Wapentake (an administrative division similar to the Anglo-Saxon hundred) and it is believed that the wapentake assembly met at the Shire Oak. Meetings at shire oaks were common across England at this time. The Skyrack Wapentake is thought to have taken its name from the association with the tree (which would have been referred to as the scīr āc in the language of the time), as most wapentakes were named after their meeting place. The Skyrack Wapentake would have met regularly to resolve legal disputes, make decisions and to muster for war. Local legend dates the tree even earlier, to the time of the ancient British druids, who were said to have revered the tree.

As Headingley grew the oak was incorporated into Otley Road and Saint Michael's Church was constructed to the south of it. Two pubs opposite the church, the Skyrack and the Original Oak were both named after the tree.

A drawing of the tree was made circa 1700, at which time it was described as ancient and Edward Parsons, writing in 1834, described it as already 1,000 years old. However, by the late 19th century the Shire Oak had decayed to little more than a stump and it fell during a gale on 26 May 1941. The remains of the tree were removed, but part was sculpted by the "Mouseman" Robert Thompson into the likeness of the Madonna and child, which is now displayed in St Michael's Church. A commemorative plaque marking the position of the oak is mounted to the garden wall of the Original Oak pub.

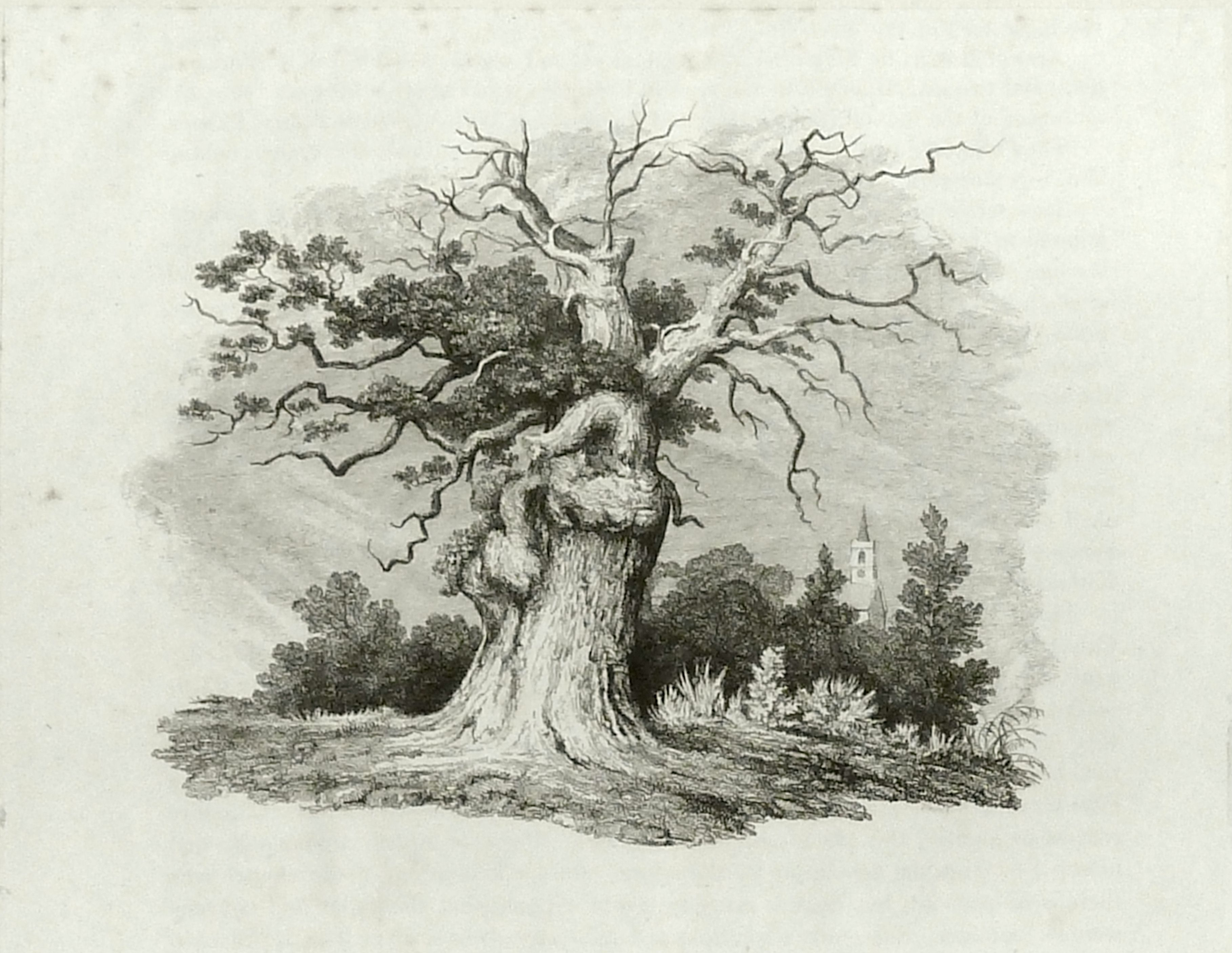
18th-century engraving of the Skyrack (Gott Collection)

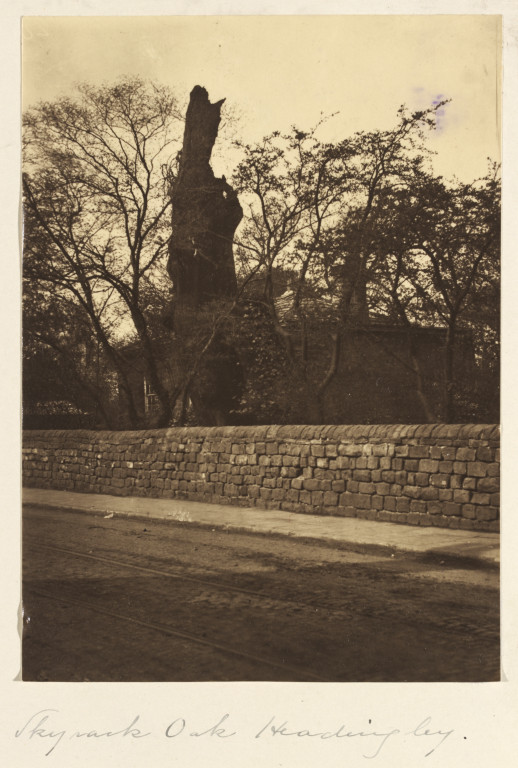
The tree in 1888

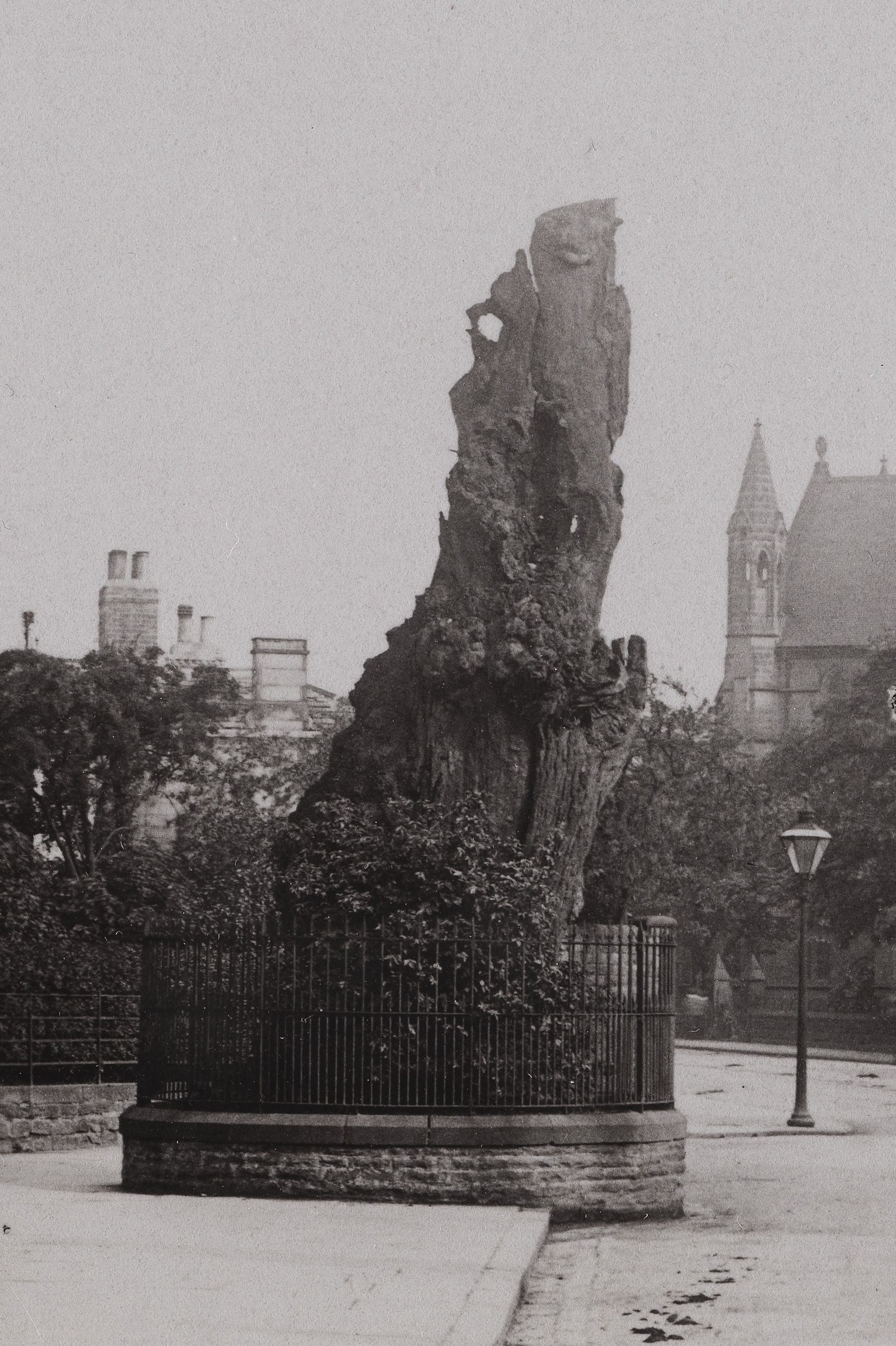
Close up image of the reduced stump in 1897

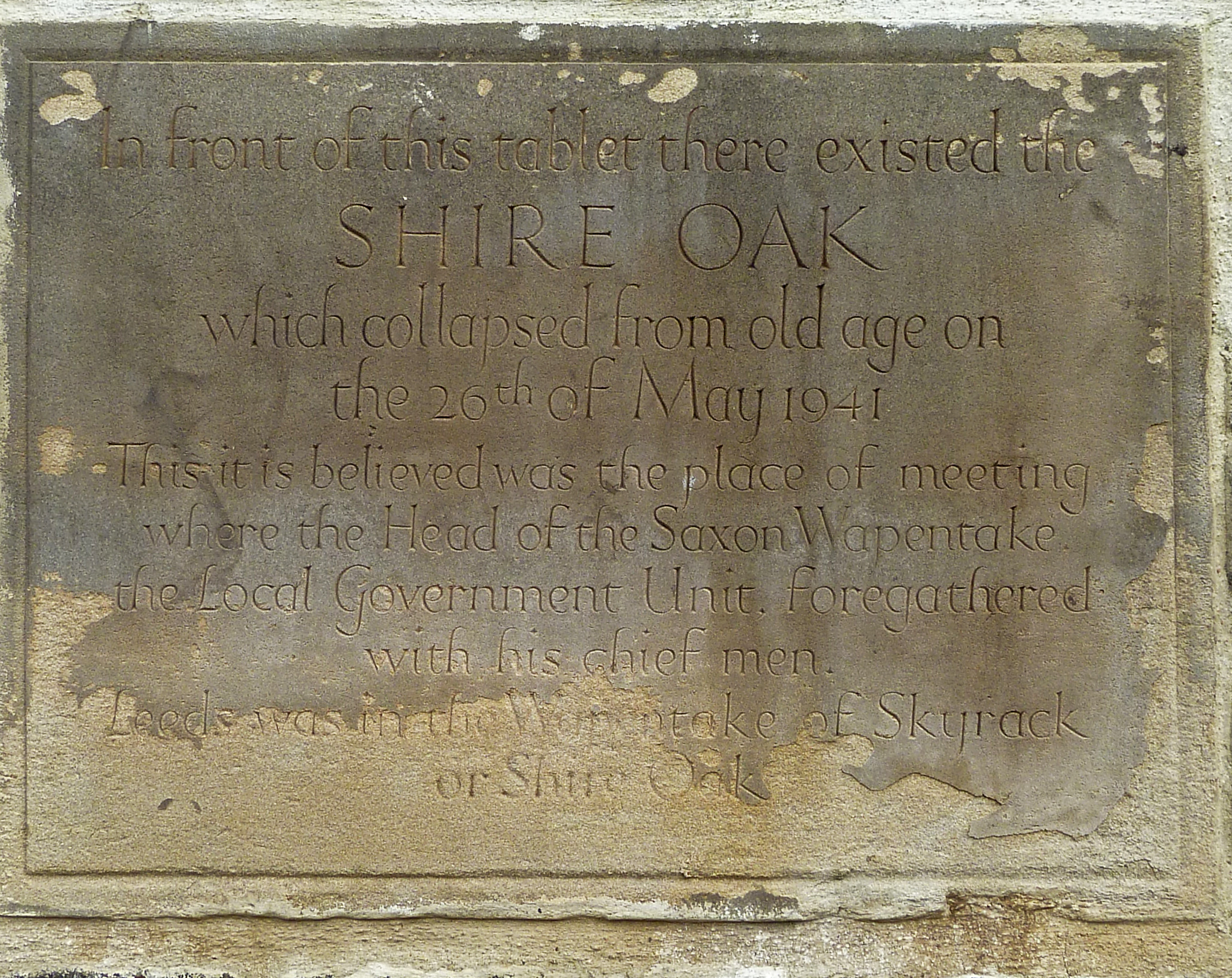
Commemorative plaque

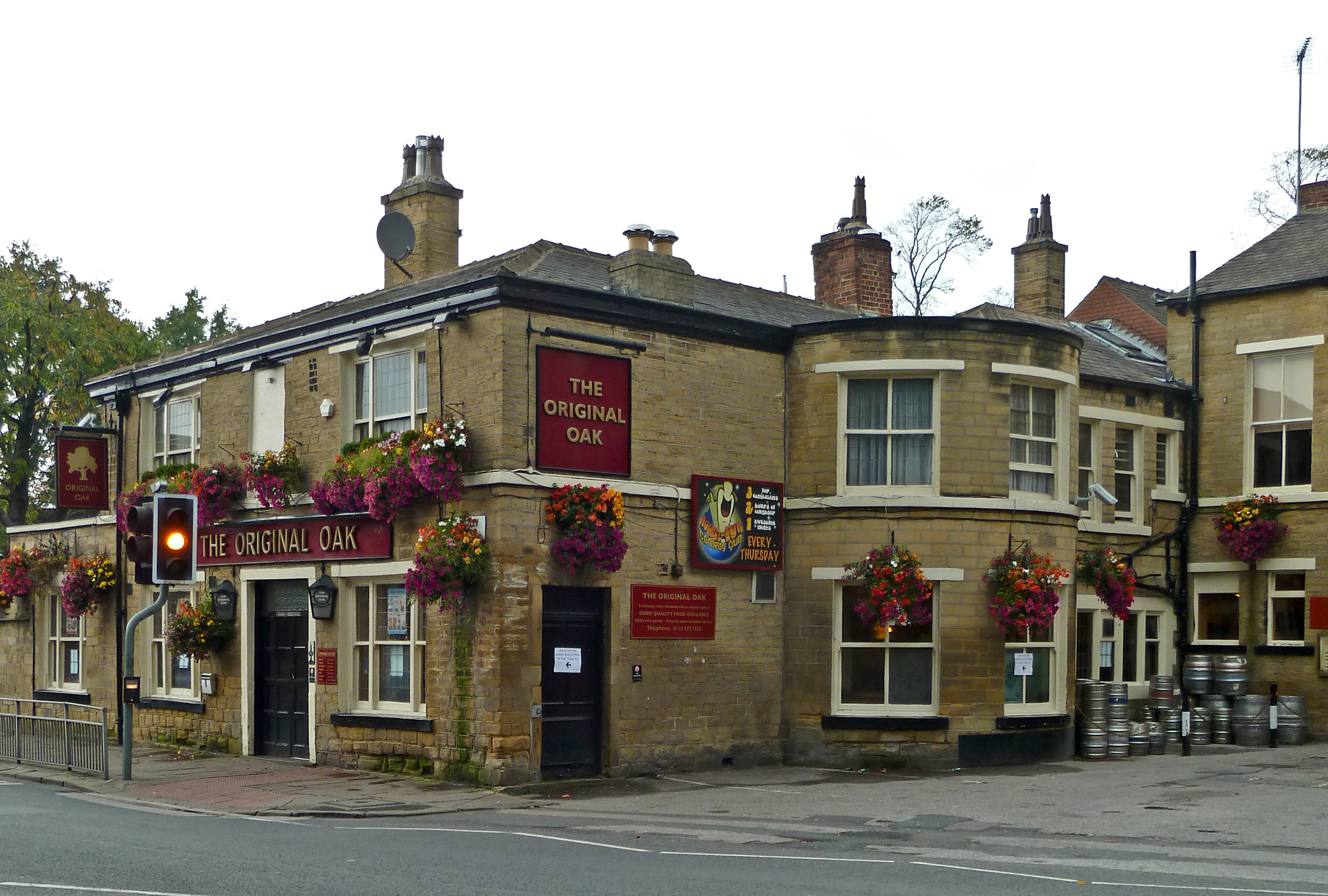
The Original Oak - the pub that now marks the site
