= Skyrack =

Wapentake of the West Riding of Yorkshire, England

Coordinates: 53.8195°N 1.5762°W

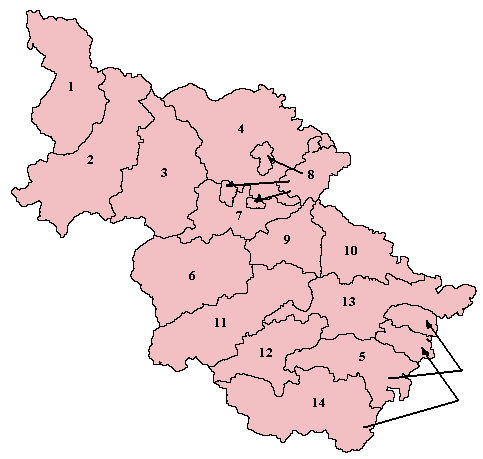
Wapentakes of the West Riding. The Upper Division labelled 7 on the map, and the Lower Division is labelled 9.

Skyrack was a wapentake of the West Riding of Yorkshire, England. It was split into upper and lower divisions and centred in Headingley, Leeds. The Lower Division included the parishes of Aberford, Bardsey, Barwick-in-Elmet, Kippax, Thorner, Whitkirk and part of Harewood, while the Upper Division included the parishes of Adel, Bingley, Guiseley and parts of Harewood, Ilkley and Otley.

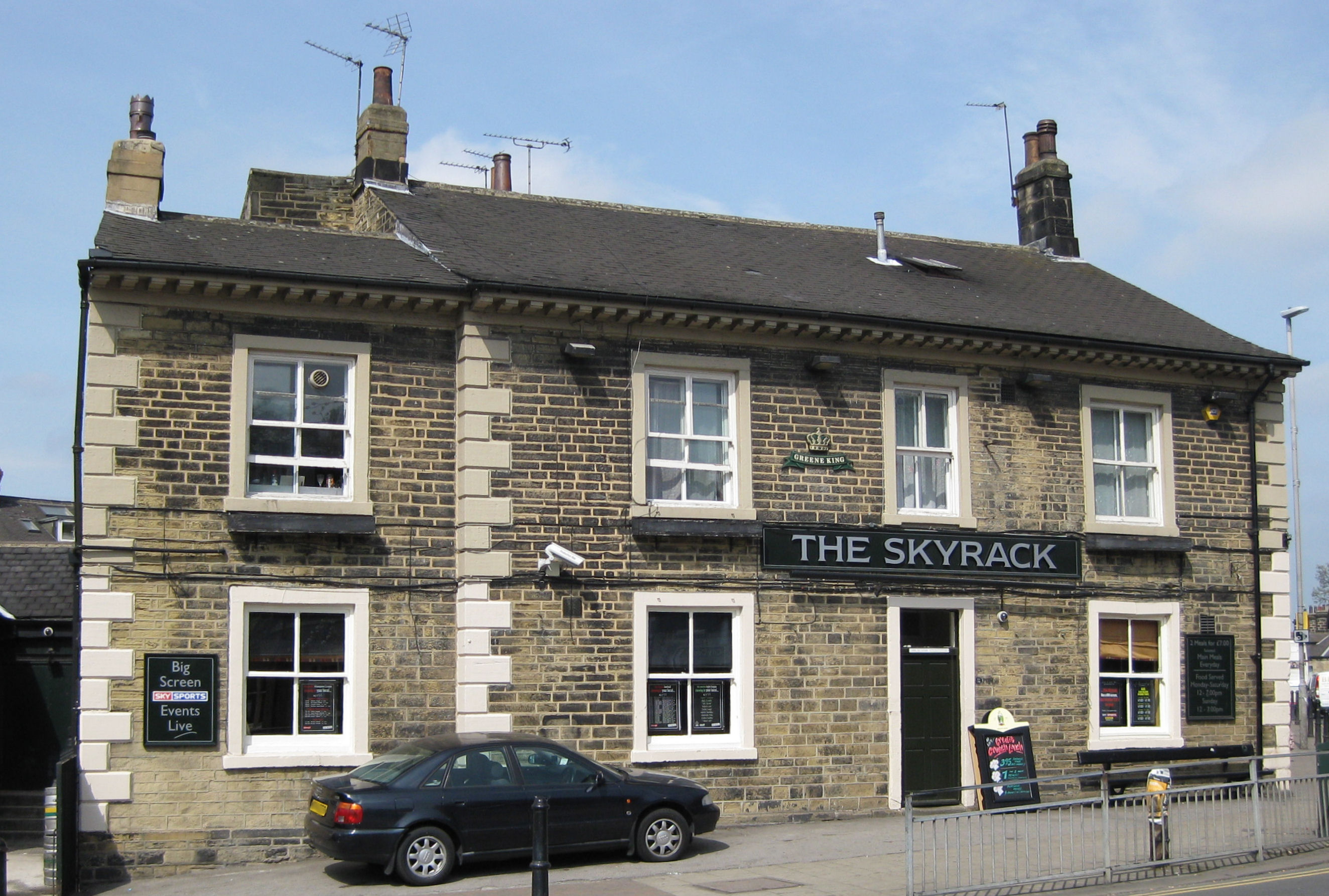
Skyrack Public House

The Upper division of Skyrack was bounded to the north by the River Wharfe whilst the southern edge was bounded by the River Aire. Both divisions together contained 82 settlements, and in 1881 it consisted of over 94,000 acres (38,000 ha).

The Skyrack wapentake derives its name from a large oak that grew for centuries in Headingley. It is believed that the word "skyrack" comes from the Old English phrase scir ac meaning "Shire Oak", under which meetings were held. The tree finally collapsed in 1941. There is a plaque to commemorate it on the outside of the garden wall of the Original Oak pub. It also gives its name to the Skyrack pub opposite the Original Oak. The pub, which is one of the stopping points on the Otley Run pub crawl, is a grade II listed building. The Yorkshire Ramblers’ Club, the second oldest mountaineering club in England, was founded at a meeting held in the Skyrack pub on 6 October 1892.
