= Headingley =

Suburb of Leeds, England

Coordinates: 53°49′17″N 01°34′40″W

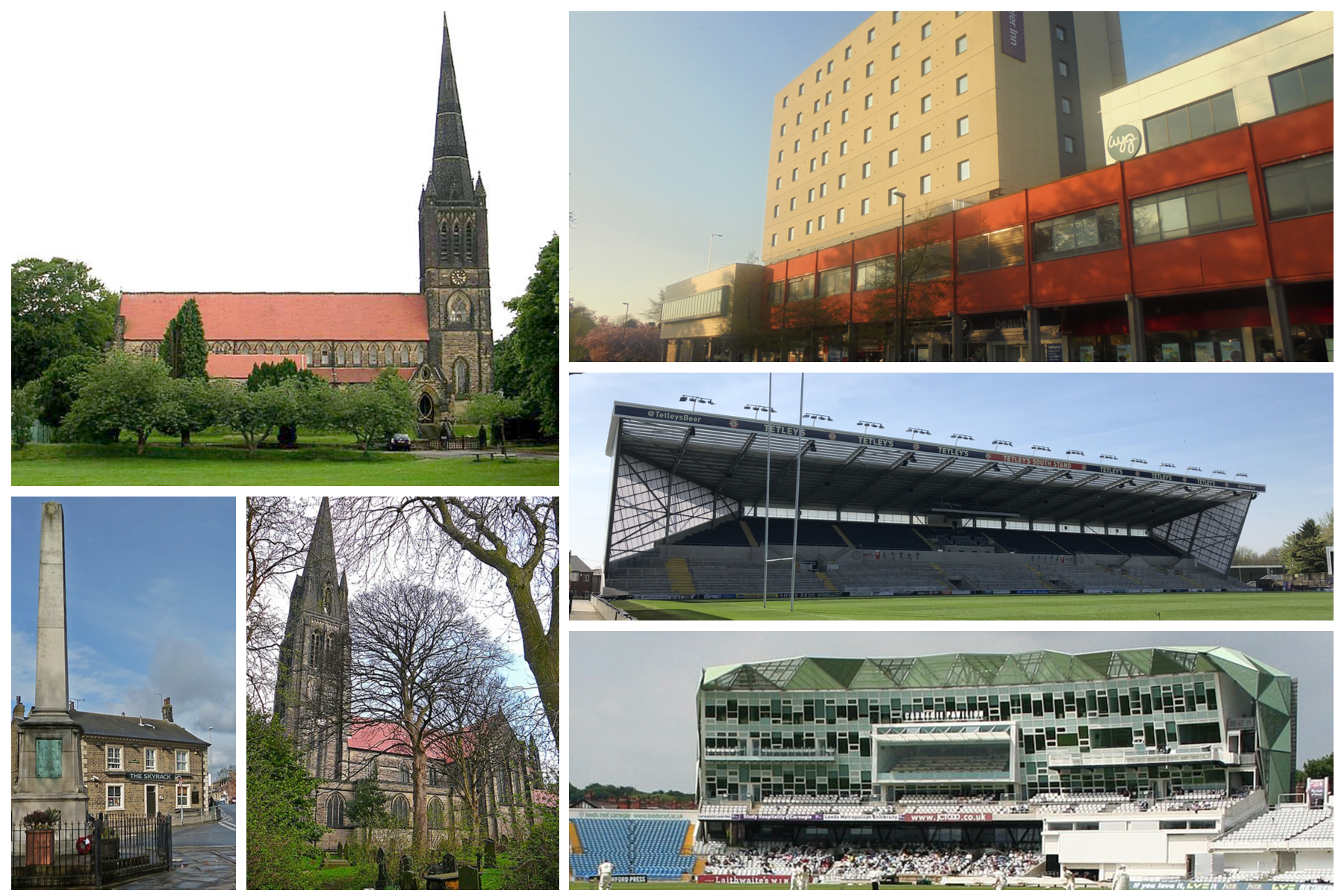
- Clockwise from top left: St Chad's Church, Arndale Centre, Headingley Stadium South Stand (rugby), Carnegie Pavilion (cricket), St Michael's Church, war memorial and Skyrack pub

- Location within West Yorkshire
- OS grid reference: SE278362
- Metropolitan borough: City of Leeds
- Metropolitan county: West Yorkshire
- Region: Yorkshire and the Humber
- Country: England
- Sovereign state: United Kingdom
- Post town: LEEDS
- Postcode district: LS6
- Dialling code: 0113
- Police: West Yorkshire
- Fire: West Yorkshire
- Ambulance: Yorkshire
- UK Parliament: Leeds Central and Headingley

Headingley is a suburb of Leeds, West Yorkshire, England, approximately two miles out of the city centre, to the north west along the A660 road. Headingley is the location of the Beckett Park campus of Leeds Beckett University and Headingley Stadium.

The area sits in the Headingley and Hyde Park ward of Leeds City Council and Leeds Central and Headingley parliamentary constituency.

== History ==
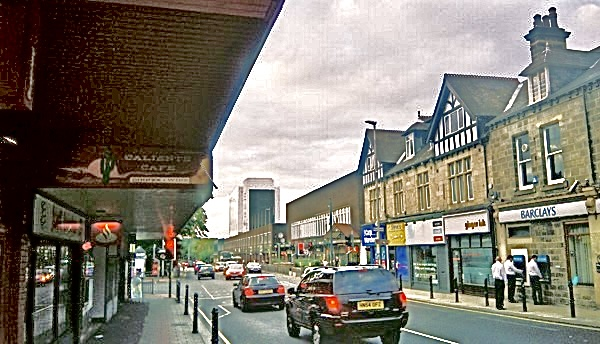
The centre of Headingley

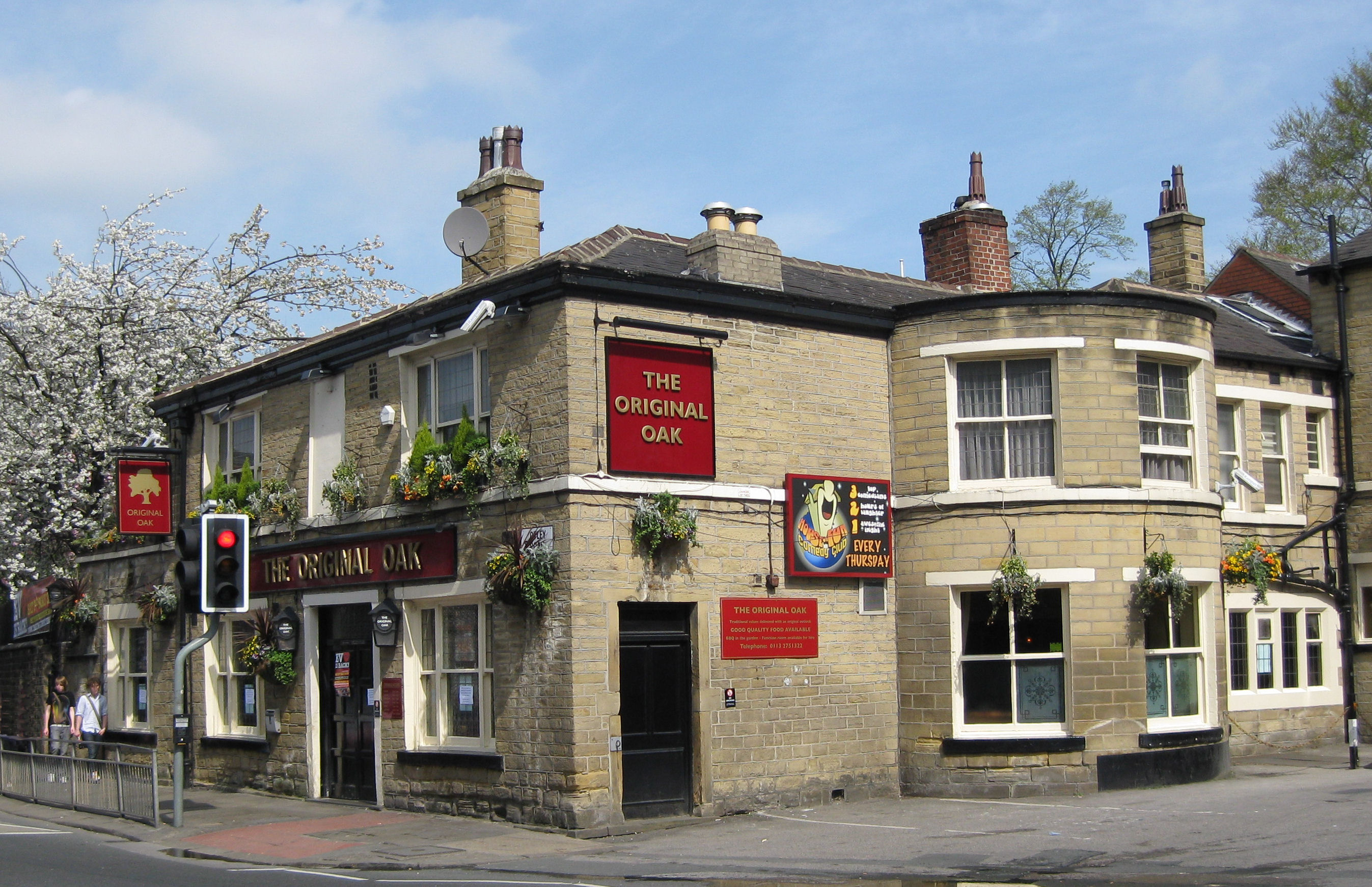
The Original Oak, named after the Skyrack Oak which grew opposite

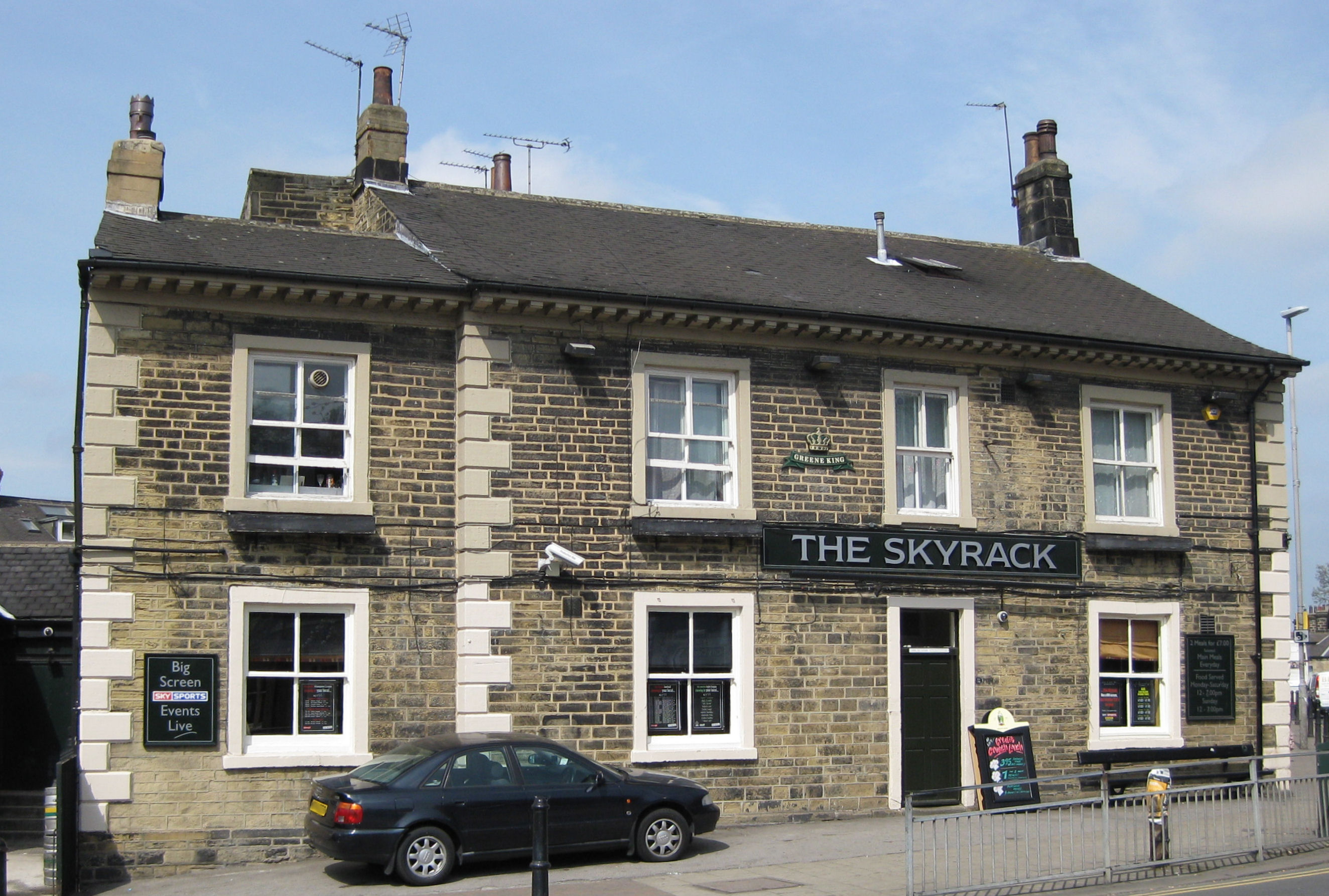
The Skyrack, historical remnants of the Wapentake

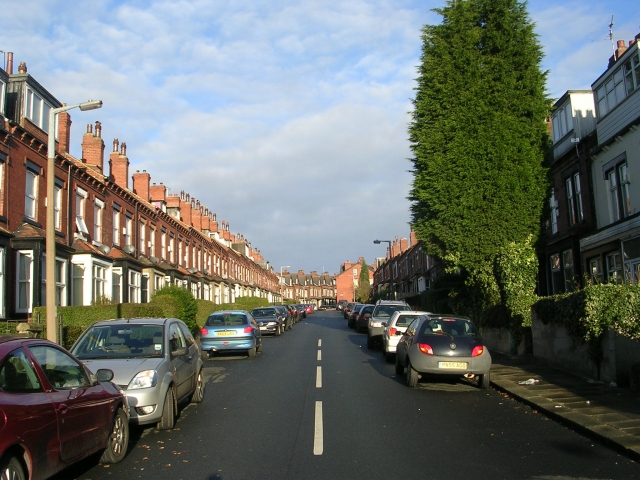
Terrace houses typical of the southern districts of Headingley

Headingley is mentioned in the Domesday Book of 1086 as Hedingelei or Hedingeleia when Ilbert de Lacy held 7 carucates, equivalent to about 840 acres, of land. The name is believed to originate from Old English, combining Head(d)inga, meaning 'of the descendants of Head(d)a,' with lēah, signifying 'open ground.' In essence, it translates to "the clearing of Hedda's people". Headda has sometimes been identified with Saint Hædde. A stone coffin found near Beckett Park in 1995 suggests there may have been an earlier settlement in late Roman or post-Roman times.

From Viking times, Headingley was the centre of the Skyrack wapentake or Siaraches, the "Shire oak". The name may refer to an oak tree that was a meeting place for settling legal disputes and raising armies. An ancient oak, said to be the Shire Oak, stood to the north of St Michael's Church until 1941, and gives its name to two public houses, the Original Oak and the Skyrack.

During the 13th century, William de Poiteven gave land in Headingley to Kirkstall Abbey. In 1341, the monaster received the remainder of the township of Headingley-cum-Burley from John de Calverley.

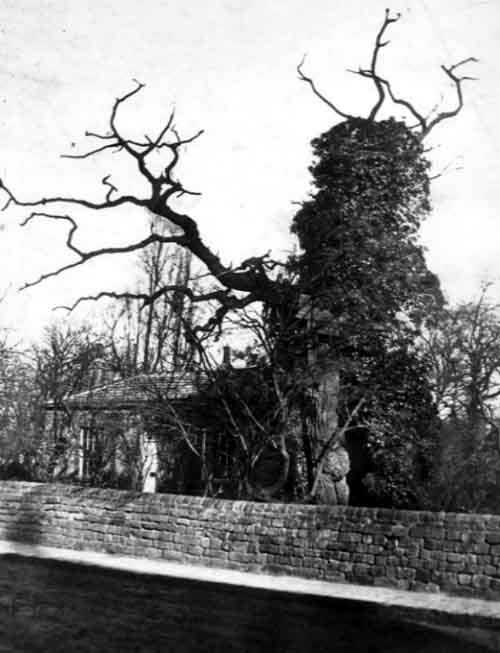
The shire oak in 1890

A map of 1711 shows Headingley as having a chapel, cottages and farmsteads scattered around a triangle of land formed by the merging of routes from north, west and south. Enclosed fields were situated around the settlement with a large tract of common land, Headingley Moor, to the north. In an 1801 census, Headingley's population was given as 300.

An 1829 Act of Parliament enclosed Headingley Moor and the land was placed for sale. Around 30 workers' cottages encroached on the fringes of the moor before 1829. Land here was generally cheaper than that at Headingley Hill as it failed to attract the building of affluent villas. This brought about the building of smaller terraced housing around Moor Road and Cottage Road. In the mid 19th century, Far Headingley had begun to develop over what was largely unclaimed common land.

Headingley was a village until the expansion of Leeds during the Industrial Revolution and became a popular suburb where the rich moved to escape the filth and pollution of the city.

In 1840, Leeds Zoological and Botanical Gardens opened but despite the opening of the nearby Headingley railway station in 1849, the zoo was loss-making and closed in 1858. The bear pit survives on Cardigan Road.

Meanwood Beck, to the east of the village, was a source of water for the early inhabitants and later provided a source of power for the Victorians of Leeds.

The Leeds Tramway terminated at a depot at Far Headingley between 1875 and 1959. The trams improved the accessibility of Headingley from Leeds city centre, which facilitated growth and attracted affluent middle class inhabitants. The tramway perhaps ended Headingley's village status and made it into a suburb.

With exception of Beckett Park and the surrounding area, most of Headingley had been developed by the beginning of the 20th century. In the 1911 census the population of Headingley was in excess of 46,000.

Leeds Beckett University (formerly Leeds Metropolitan University) has a campus at Beckett Park in Headingley. Much of the housing around Kirkstall Lane is rented to students. The conversion of Leeds Polytechnic into a university and its subsequent growth brought about an increased student population.

Headingley Stadium hosts England test matches and rugby league matches bringing many spectators to the area. The cricket ground has been enlarged to maintain its eligibility for test matches and in 2006 the eastern terraces on the rugby ground were replaced with the Carnegie stand. The winter shed cricket pavilion has been replaced with a new stand and media centre.

== Sports ==
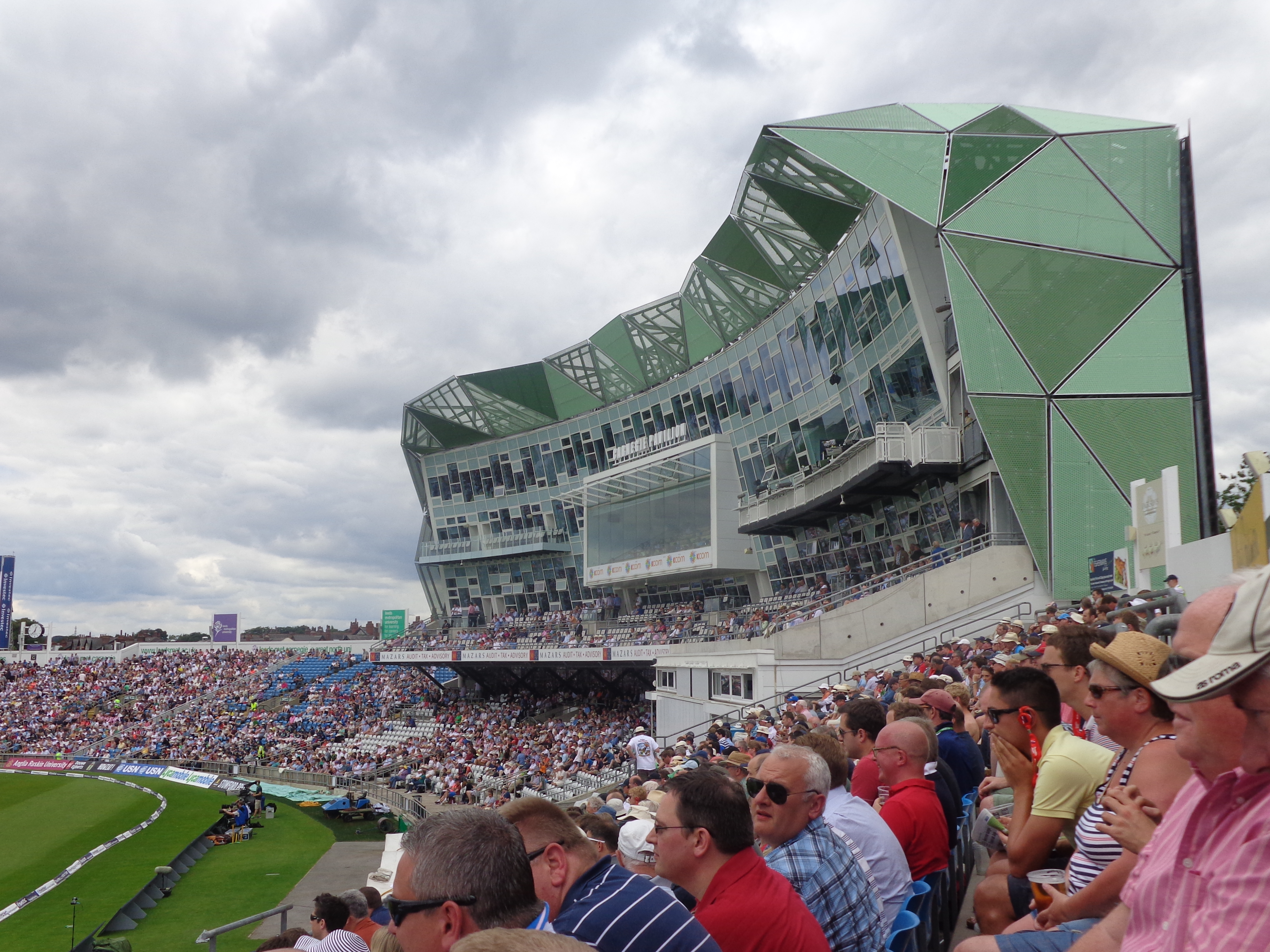
Headingley Stadium cricket ground during an England game

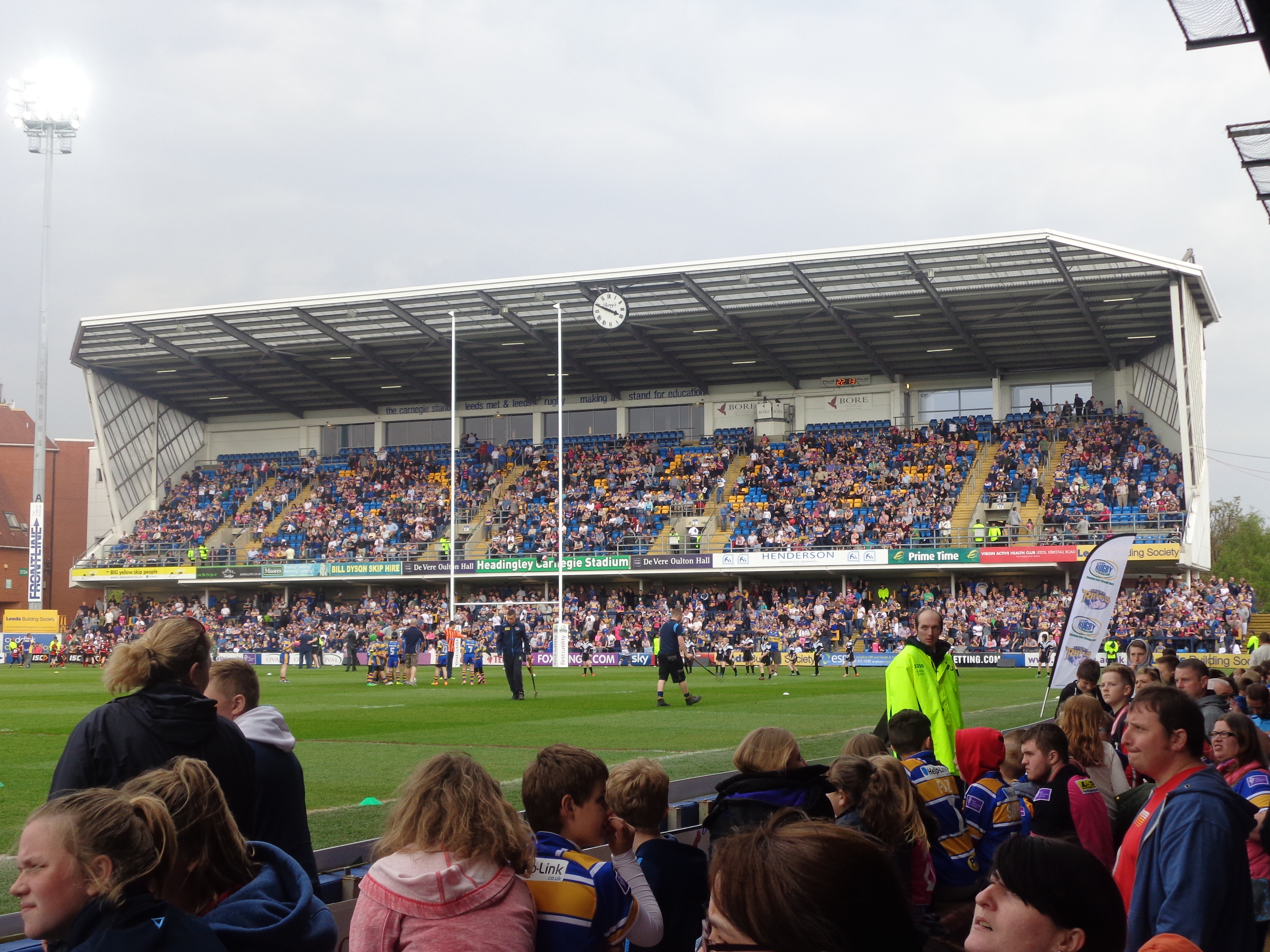
The Carnegie Stand at Headingley Stadium rugby ground

=== Professional ===
Headingley is also known in sporting circles; its stadium is known as Headingley – earlier spelt Headingly. The stadium is home to the Yorkshire County Cricket Club, the Northern Superchargers franchise cricket team, the Leeds Rhinos rugby league and Yorkshire Carnegie rugby union clubs. Northern Diamonds play some of their games at Headingley in the Charlotte Edwards Cup and Rachael Heyhoe Flint Trophy.

Since 2000, the stadium's cricket ground has been nearly entirely rebuilt in order to retain Test match status. The winter shed was demolished in 2008 and replaced by a new stand and media centre. The rugby ground also saw development with the building of the Carnegie Stand which replaced the former Eastern Terraces. This was built with co-operation from Leeds Beckett University who retain lecture rooms in the building.

=== Amateur ===
Headingley is also home to an amateur association football team, Headingley AFC. The club nearly folded after losing its home ground, but was offered a new ground in 2008 by the University of Bradford. It now plays in Weetwood Playing Fields, owned by the University of Leeds. They attracted media attention in January 2019 for featuring a shirt sponsor warning of the dangers of gambling. There are also two amateur cricket clubs (Headingley Bramhope CC & St. Chads CC) in Far Headingley.

== Politics ==
Headingley is in the Leeds Central and Headingley constituency. The current Member of Parliament (MP) is Alex Sobel (Labour Party) who has represented the area since the 2017 general election. The ward of Headingley and Hyde Park has two Labour councillors, Abdul Hannan and Jonathan Pryor and one Green councillor, Tim Goodall.

== Amenities ==
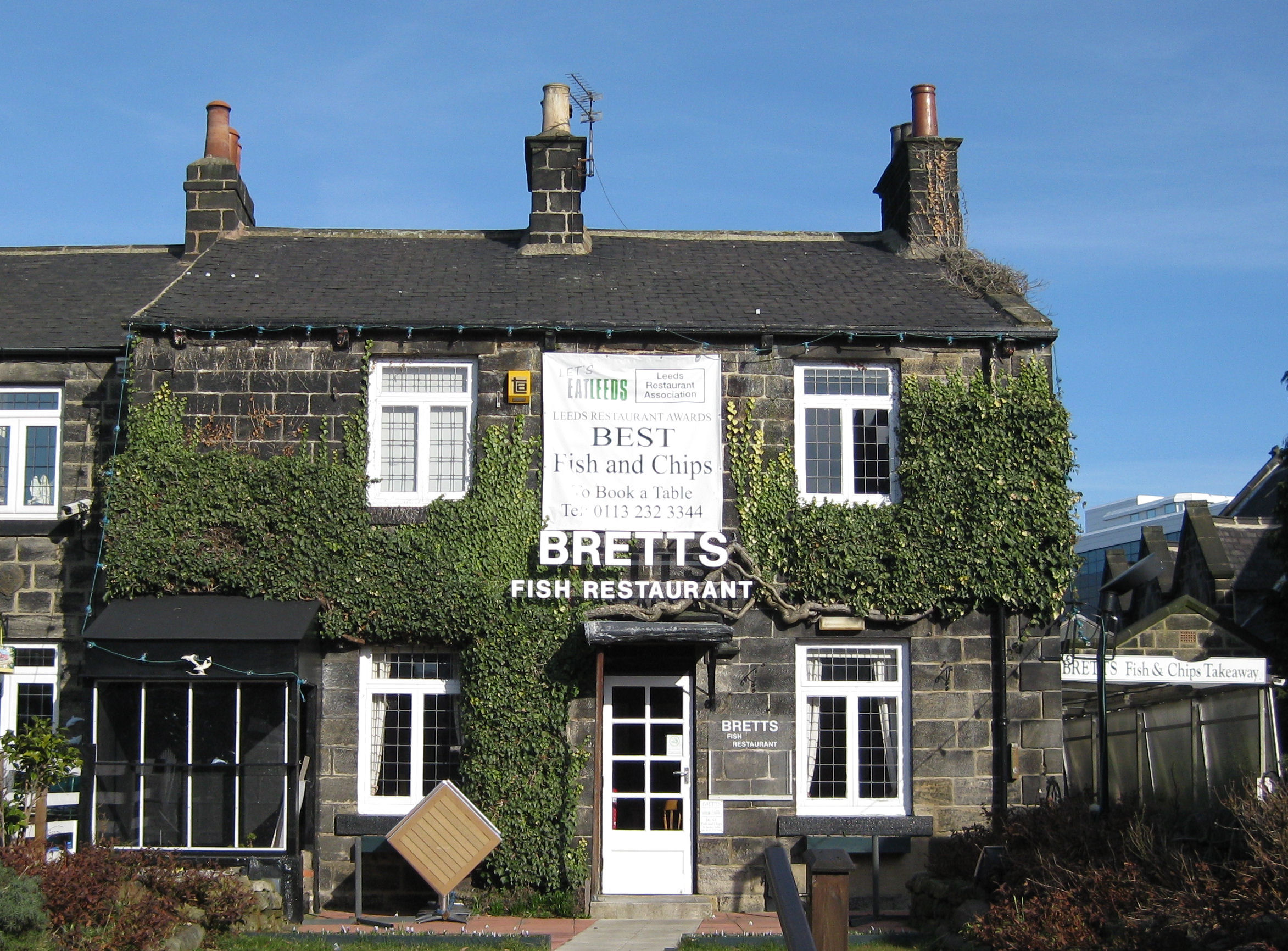
Brett's Fish Restaurant, North Lane

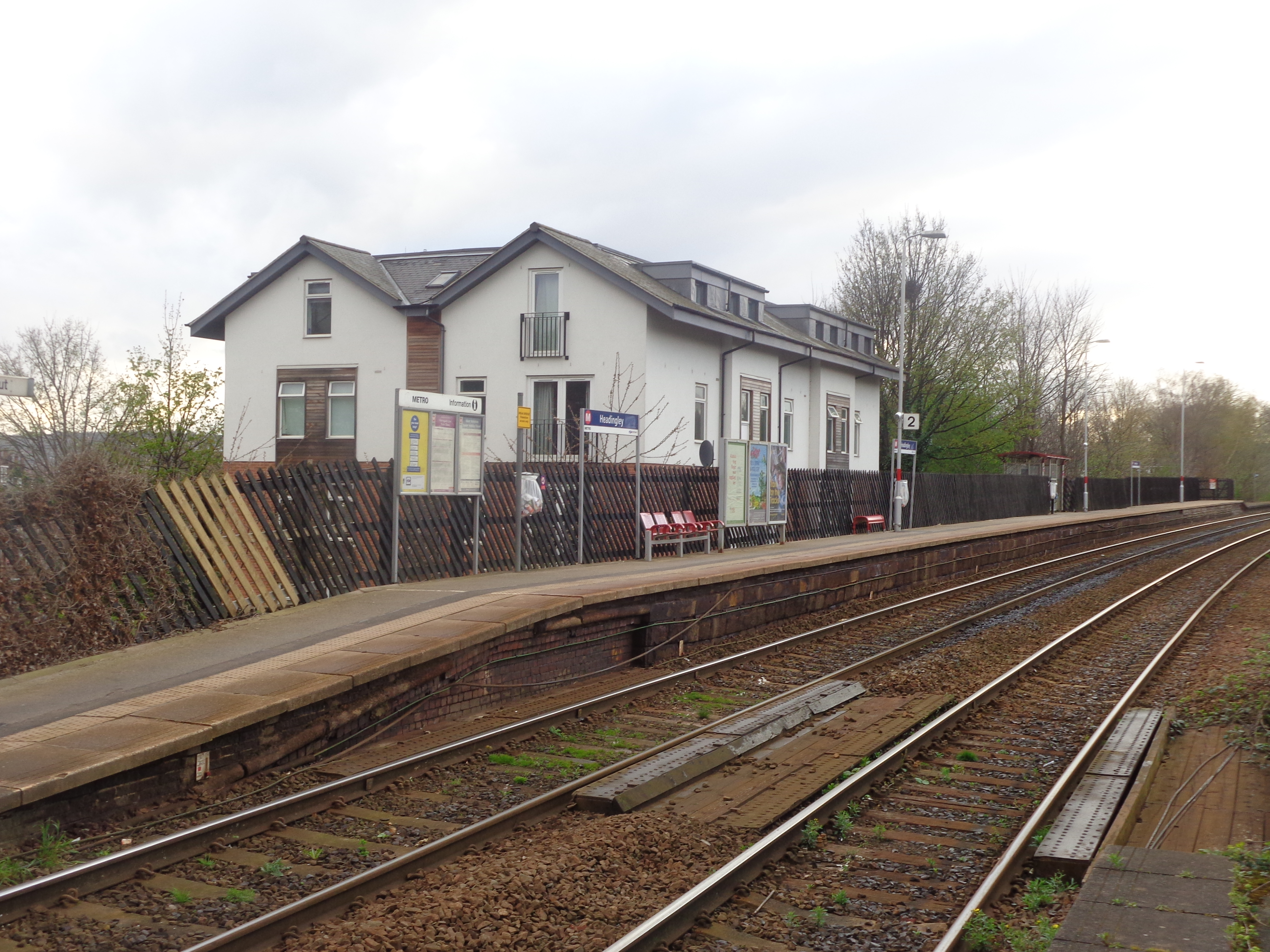
Headingley railway station before redevelopment in 2019

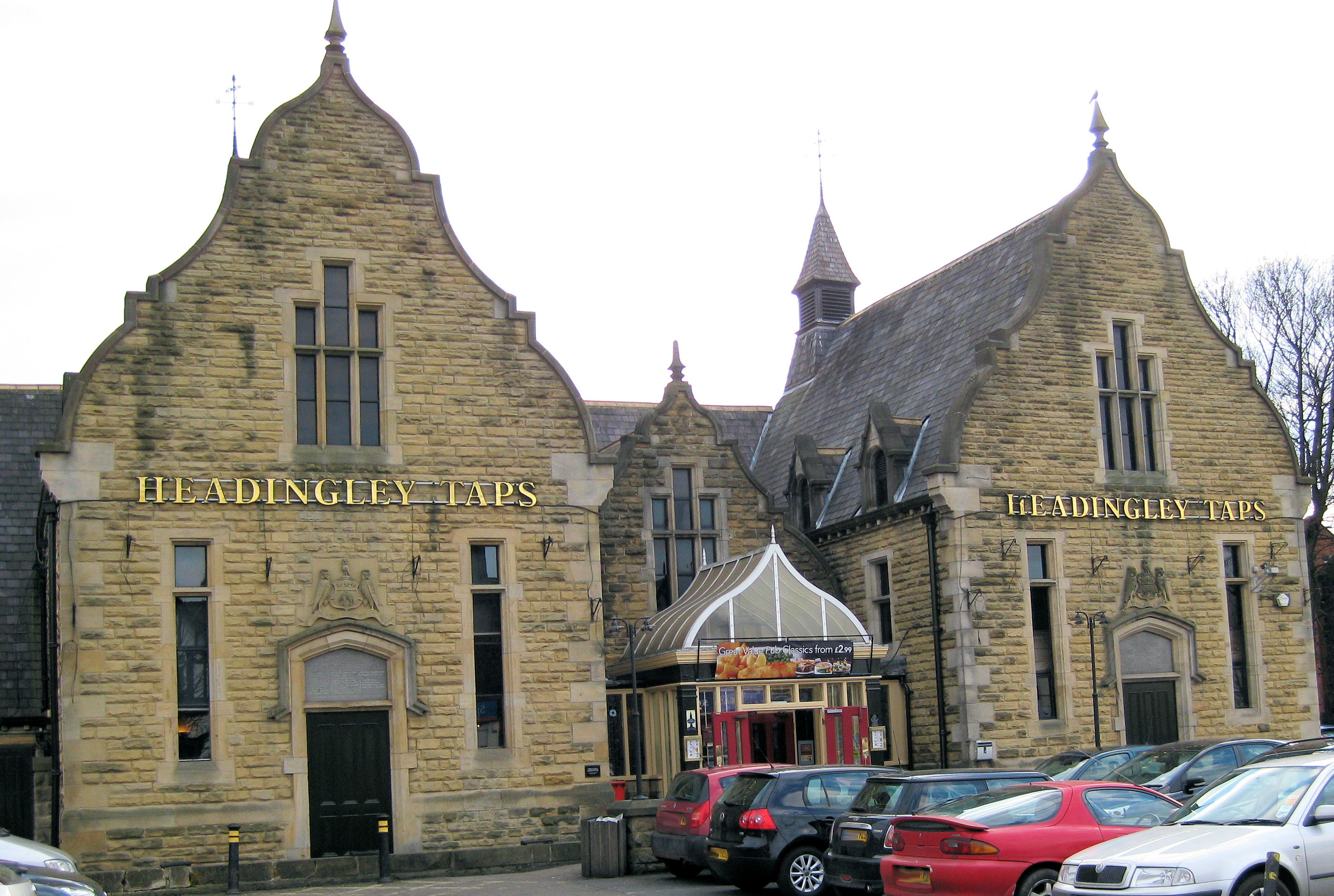
The Headingley Taps, a pub on North Lane

Headingley has two fish and chip shops/fish restaurants which have been operating since the 1930s: Brett's, a 19th-century stone building on North Lane, and the now permanently closed Catch Seafood Headingley (formerly Bryan's and then The Fisherman's Lodge), a more modern building on Weetwood Lane whose parent company entered administration in October 2022. There are several pubs and bars plus extensive shopping areas. The pub Headingley Taps is so called because it was formerly a water pumping station. In Headingley Central (formerly the Arndale Centre) there are large retailers and several other chain shops as well as a small multi-storey car park. Headingley also has a small library on North Lane. There are many banks, building societies, restaurants, cafes and charity shops. Along Otley Road there is a large Oxfam bookshop. Until 2005, Headingley had two cinemas, 'The Lounge' and 'The Cottage Road Cinema' (usually referred to as 'Cottage Road'). The Lounge Cinema in the centre of Headingley has since closed and is being redeveloped as office and living accommodation, leaving only Cottage Road in Far Headingley. The area's Woolworths closed in the 1990s. Until the 1980s, the Arndale Centre boasted a bowling alley. The Arndale Centre began undergoing an external facelift in 2009. The nearest large supermarket is a Morrisons in Kirkstall, approximately a mile away from the centre of Headingley. There is a Premier Inn hotel above the Arndale Centre in the tallest building in Headingley, formerly an office block. Headingley is also famous for the Otley Run, which is a pub crawl starting at Woodies Ale House in Far Headingley and finishing at the Dry Dock near Leeds City Centre. Typically the Otley run is done in fancy dress.

== People ==
Many famous writers, past and present, are connected with Headingley: Arthur Ransome, best known perhaps for the children's classic Swallows and Amazons, was born there, J. R. R. Tolkien the writer and author of The Lord of the Rings, lived there when he worked at the university, playwright Alan Bennett once lived over a butcher's shop (now a dry cleaner's) opposite the Three Horseshoes and TV writer Kay Mellor lived in Weetwood. Many writers and poets who currently live in the area participate in the annual Headingley LitFest, which takes place each March, using venues like the Heart Centre, The New Headingley Club, various cafés and private houses. The tenth LitFest took place in 2017. Reviews of all talks and performances are online on the LitFest blog.

In the time of Queen Victoria, Prince Alemayehu of Abyssinia, brought to England after the defeat of his father King Tewedros, died of pneumonia at an address in Hollin Lane, Far Headingley.

Edward Baines, editor of the Leeds Mercury in the 19th century, lived at Headingley Lodge, north of Kirkstall Lane, and then St Ann's Hill on St Ann's Lane.

The social reformer, suffragist and writer Isabella Ford was born in Headingley in 1855.

Yorkshire Ripper Peter Sutcliffe committed two of his 20 attacks in Headingley. He killed 20-year-old Jacqueline Hill – the last of the 13 women he killed – in the area on 17 November 1980. On 24 September that year, he had also attacked Singapore-born doctor Upadhya Bandara, 34, who survived the assault. Sutcliffe was arrested within two months of Hill's murder and subsequently sentenced to life imprisonment for a total of 13 murders and seven attempted murders.

Rory Cobb, who won an Antrim junior hurling championship with St Brigid's, originates from the area.

== Headingley Development Trust ==
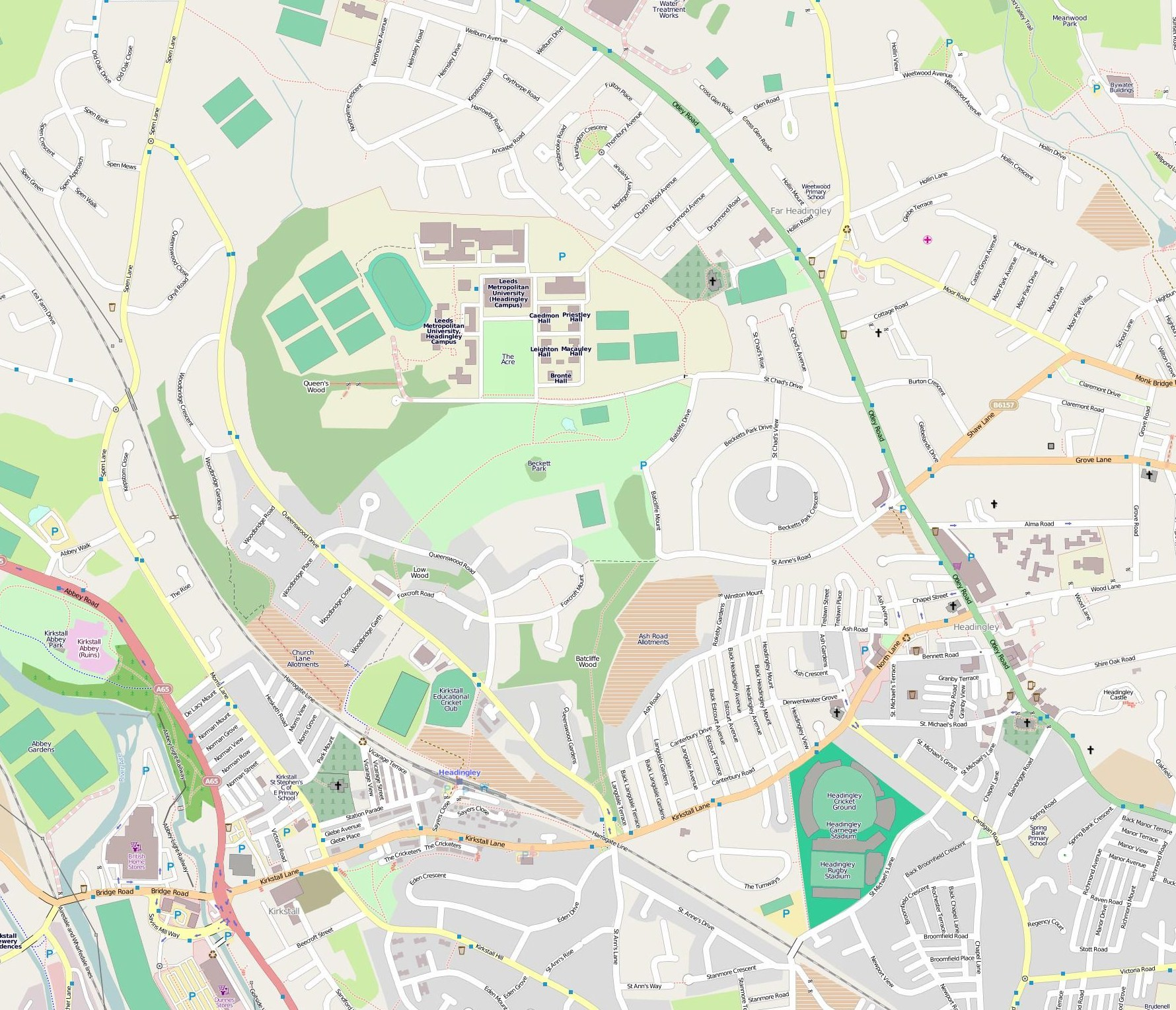
Headingley street map

The Headingley Development Trust (HDT) is a community benefit society, founded in 2005 by local residents, organisations and small businesses. It is a community business that is self-financing and supports. a range of initiatives that benefit the local community. HDT has over 1,200 members, making it one of the largest Development Trusts of its kind in the UK. In 2018 it successfully raised over £480,000 through a community share offer to create the Headingley Investment Fund (HIF). Since 2011, HDT has operated the Headingley Enterprise and Arts Centre (HEART). It also runs several publicly operated local businesses and a variety of cultural initiatives.

== Churches ==
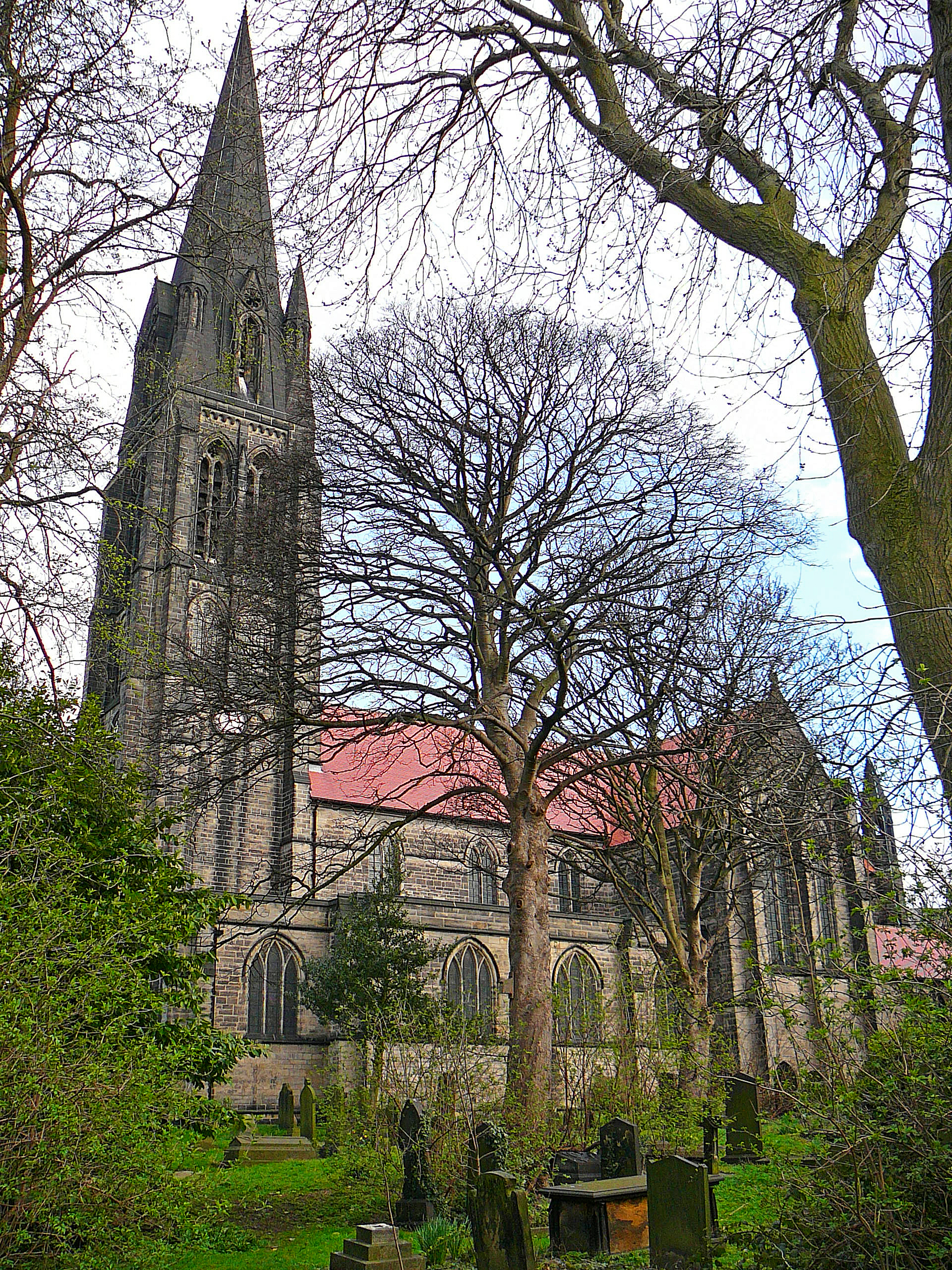
Headingley Parish Church

Headingley Parish Church is dedicated to St Michael and All Angels. It is a large, grade II* listed, steepled church on the corner of Otley Road and St Michael's Road, opposite the Skyrack public house. The Church was built between 1884 and 1886 as the third church on this site. There is a separate parish of Far Headingley, with its parish church of St Chad's (also a large steepled church and grade II* listed).

South Parade Baptist church (1908 and 1925, part of Cornerstone Baptist Church since 2020) and Headingley Methodist Church (1840–45 and later extensions) are both grade II listed. St Columba's United Reformed church is a modern building, as is the Roman Catholic parish church of St Urban's, located to the east of the area. Hinsley Hall in Headingley is the pastoral and conference centre for the Roman Catholic Diocese of Leeds. The small Lutheran church of St Luke's in Alma Road was converted from the coach house and stable of a Victorian villa.

The Anglican Bishop of Leeds and the Roman Catholic Bishop of Leeds both live within the Headingley area.

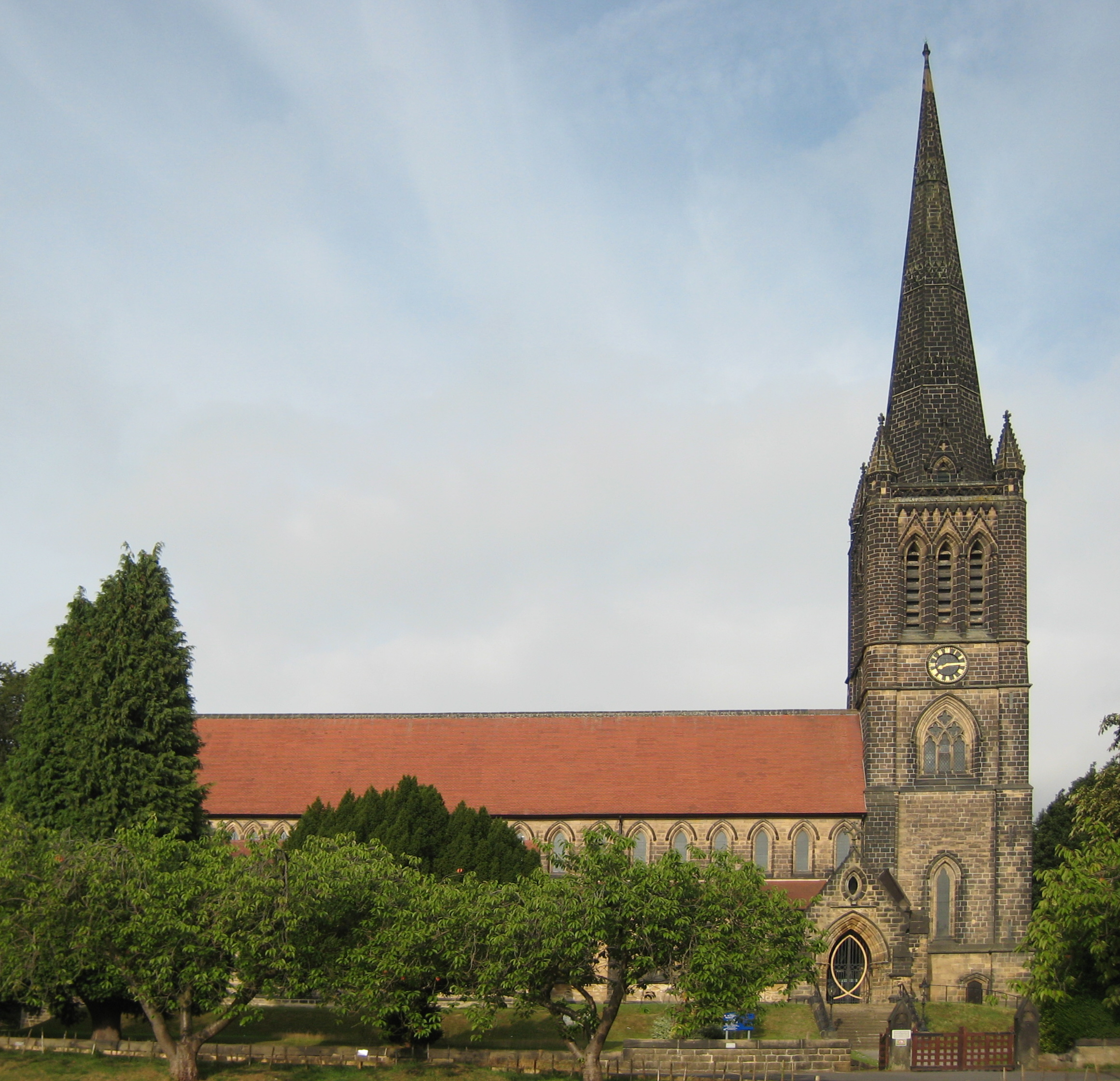
St Chad's Church

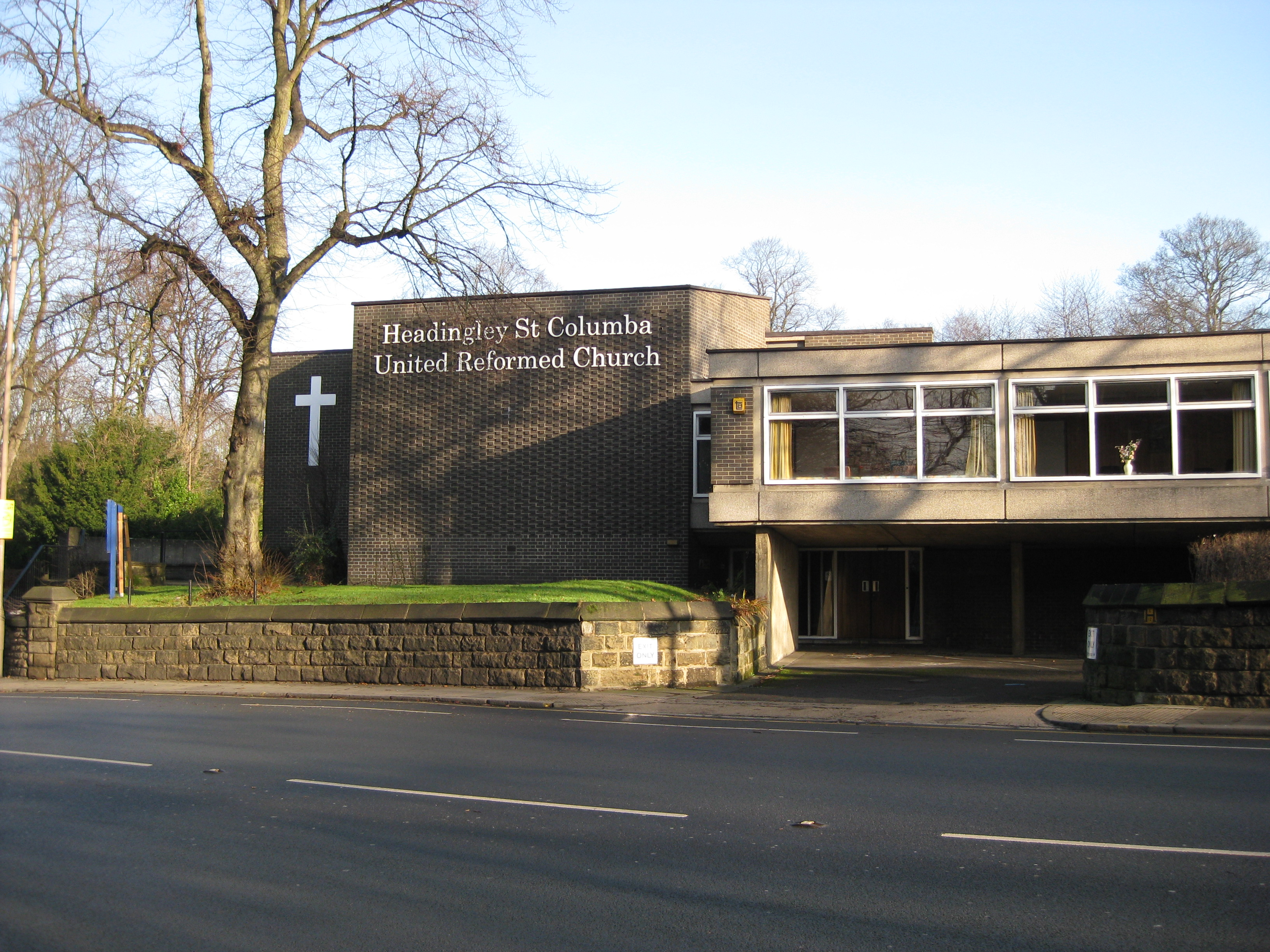
St Columba United Reformed Church

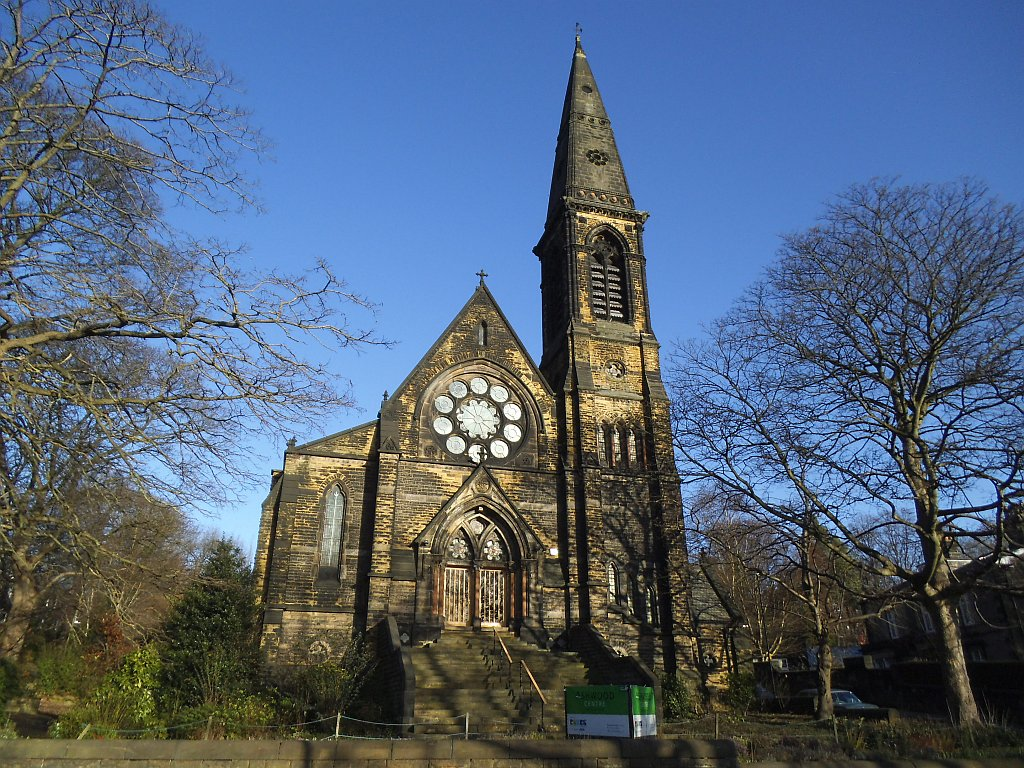
Headingley Hill Congregational Church

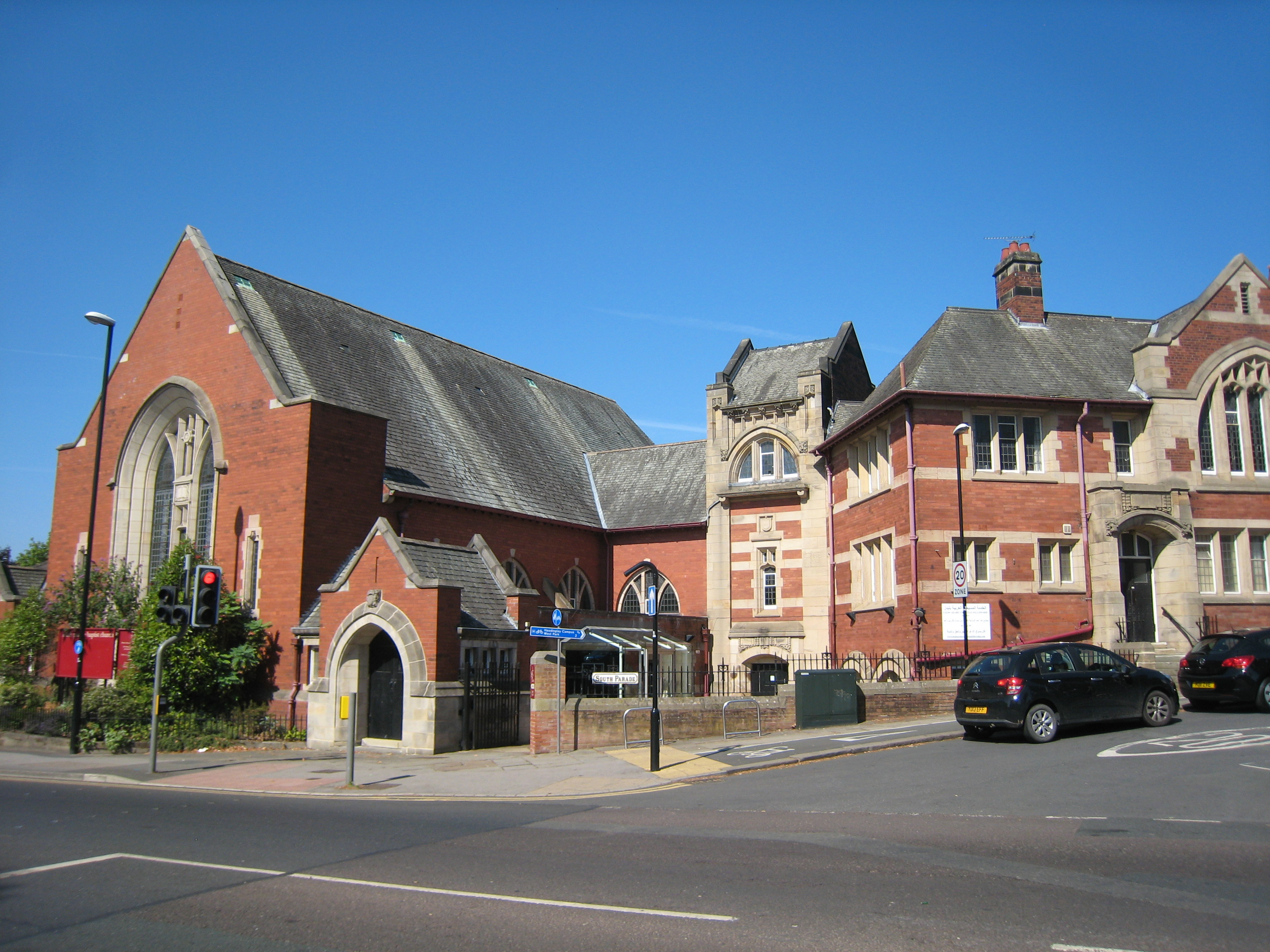
South Parade (now Cornerstone) Baptist Church

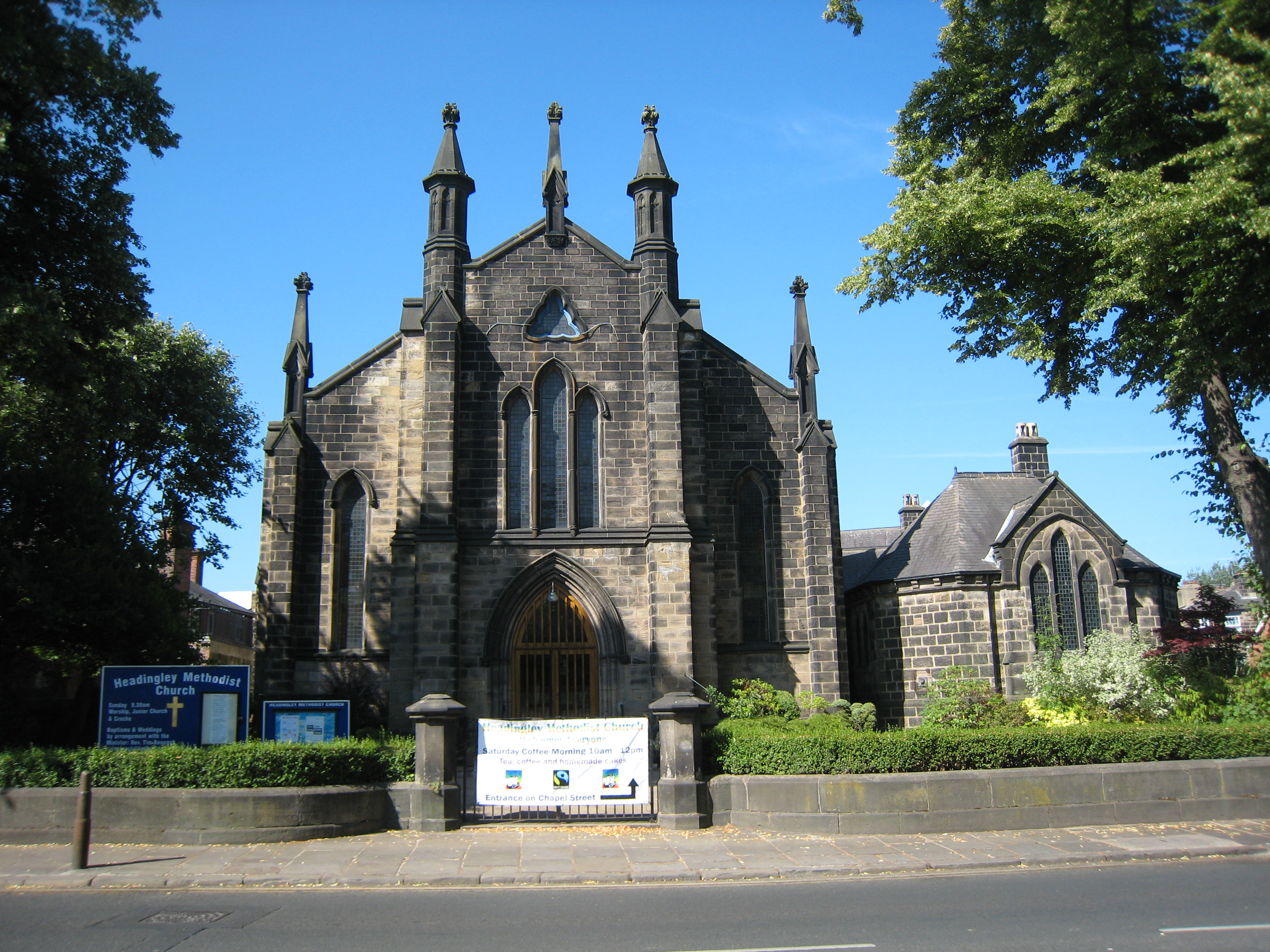
Headingley Methodist Church

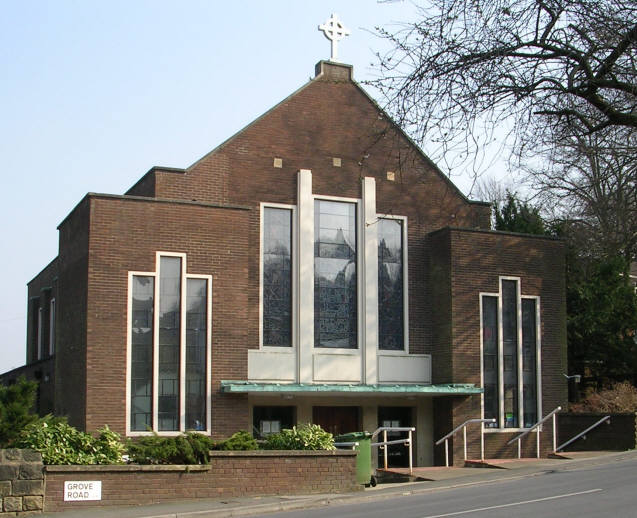
St Urban's Catholic Church

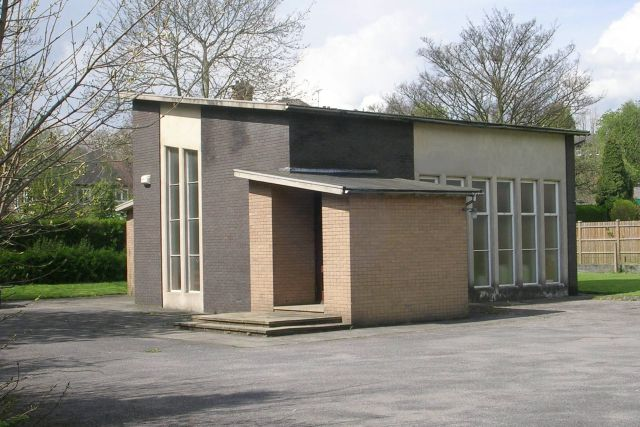
Ebenezer Particular Baptist Church

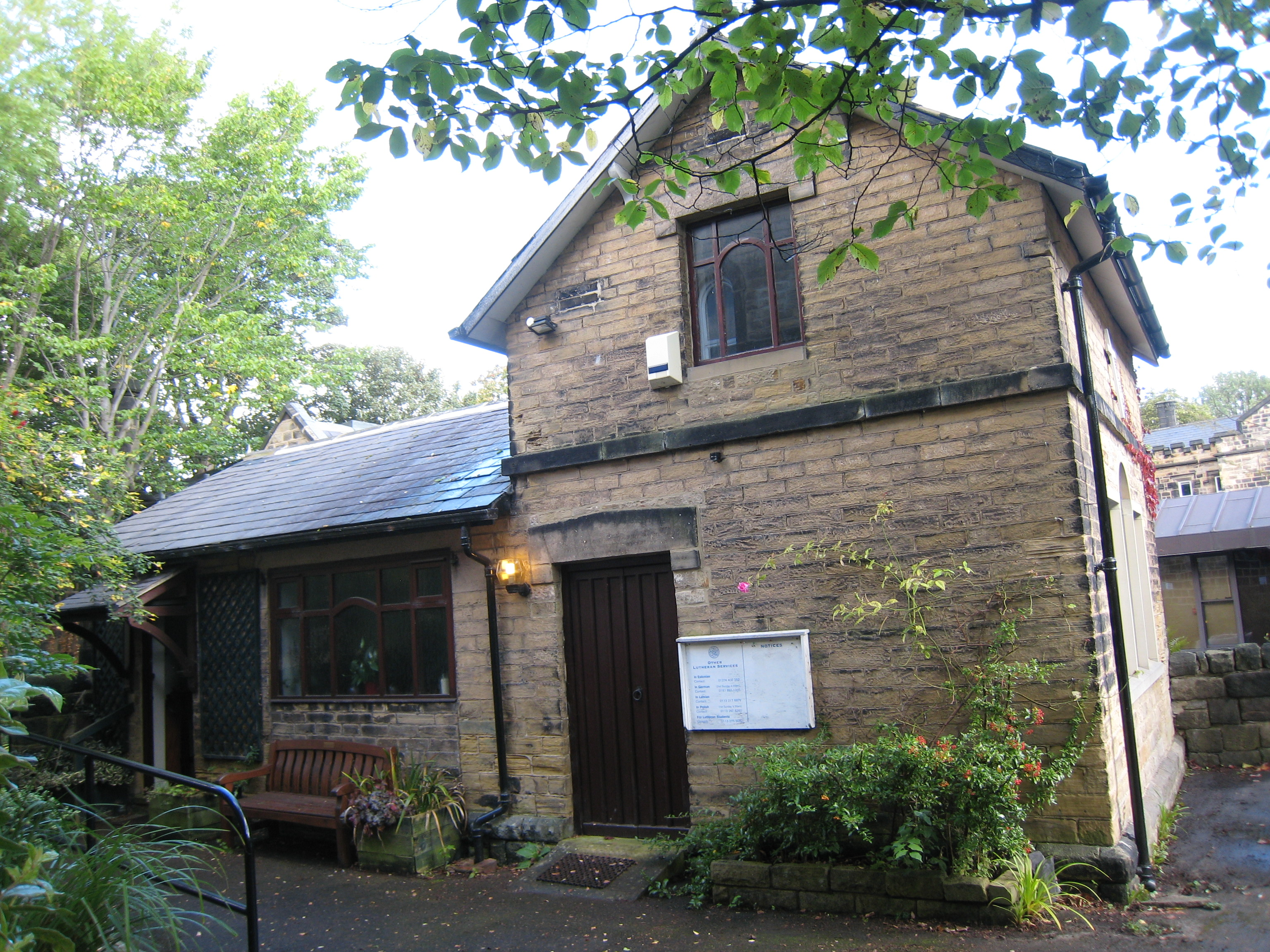
St Luke's Lutheran Church

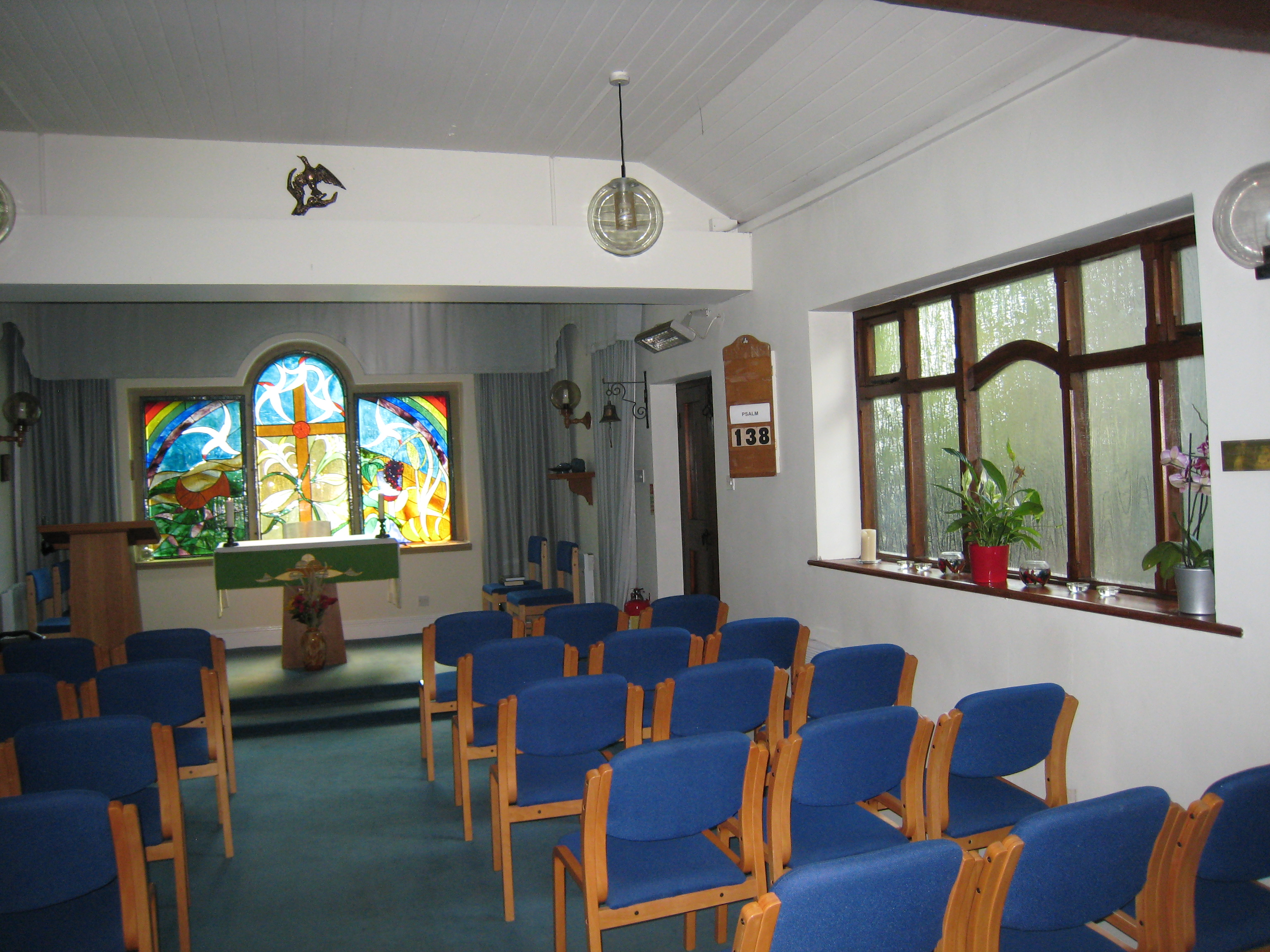
St Luke's: interior

== Buildings of architectural interest ==
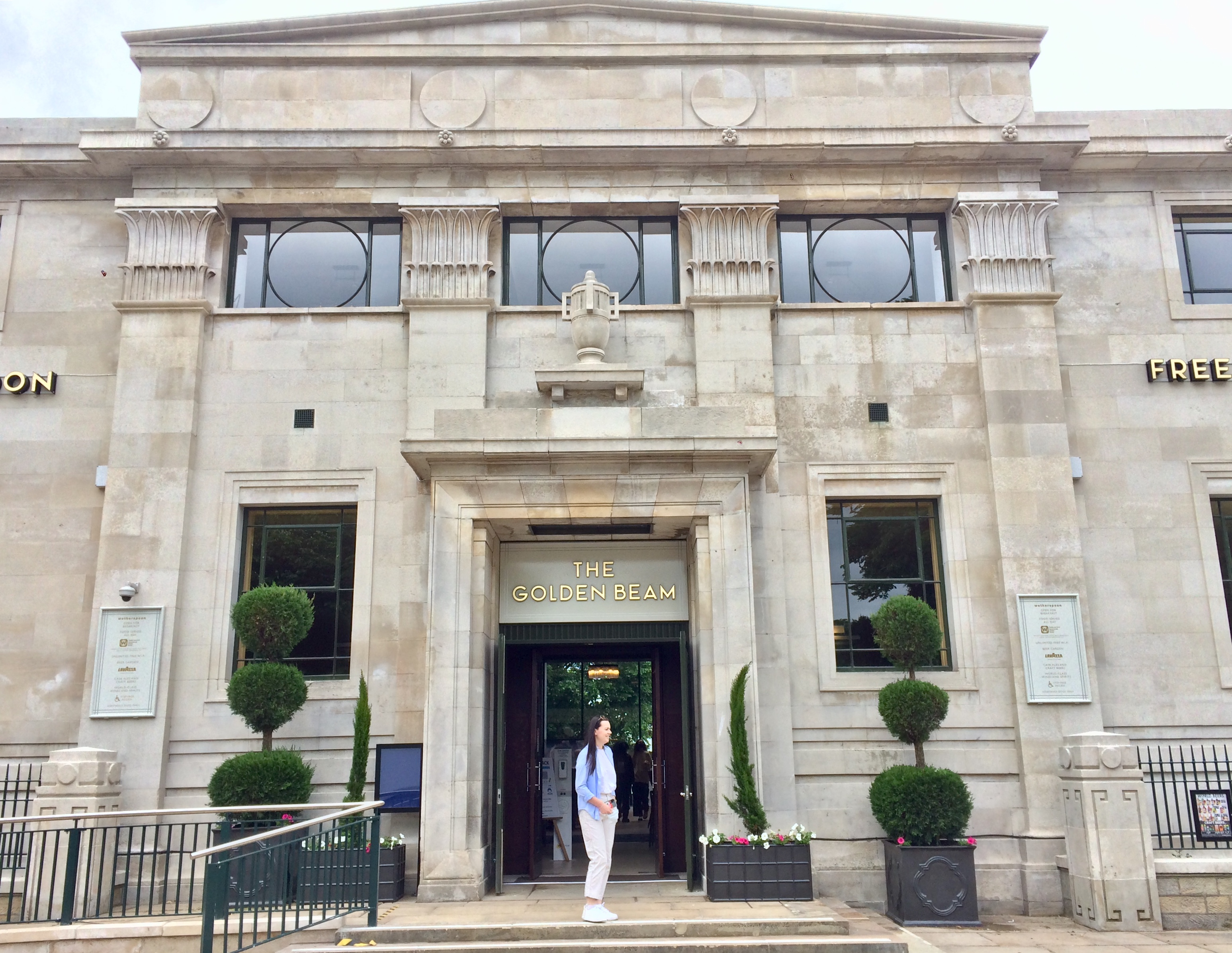
Former Elinor Lupton Centre, now The Golden Beam

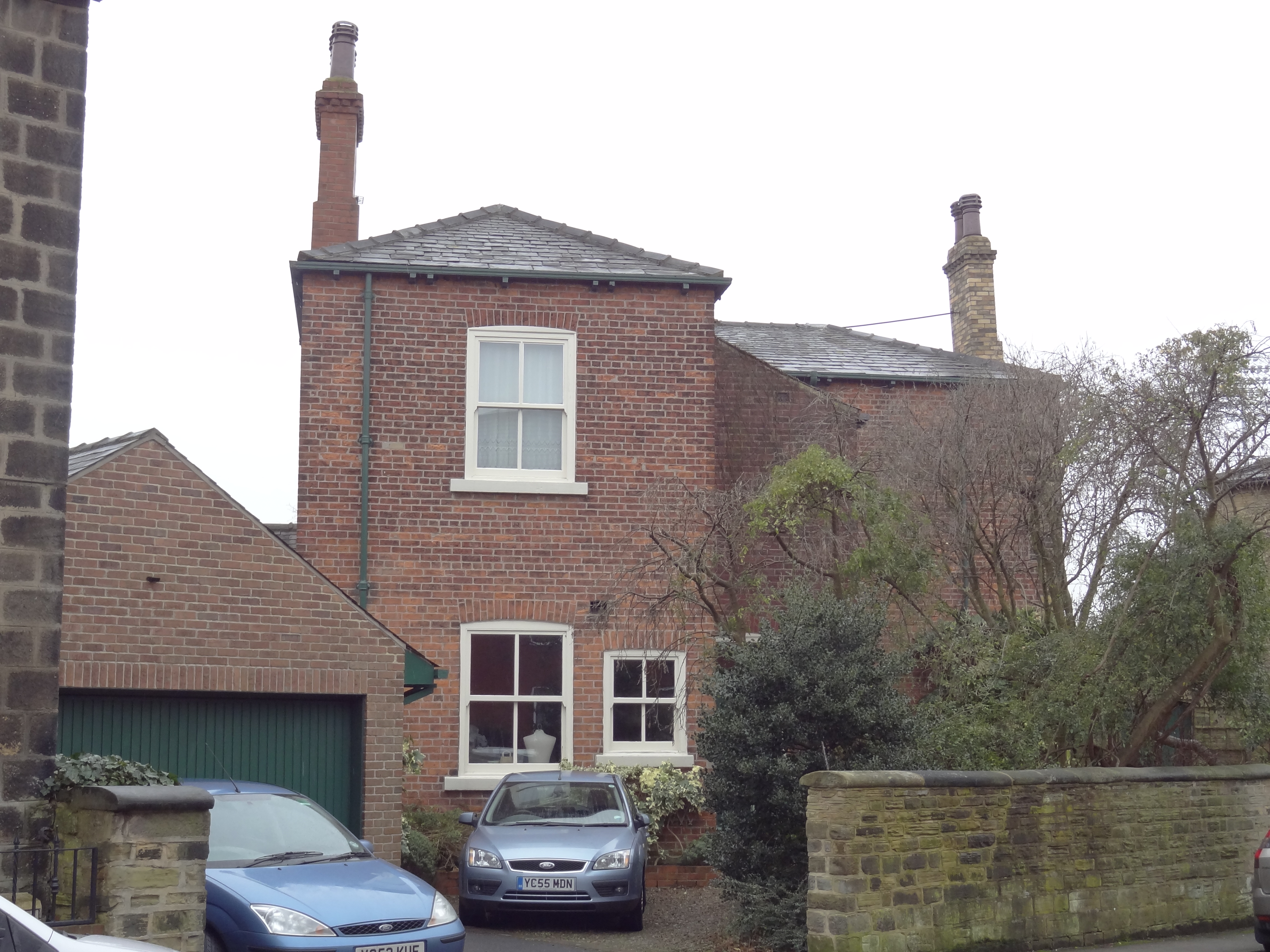
Spring House

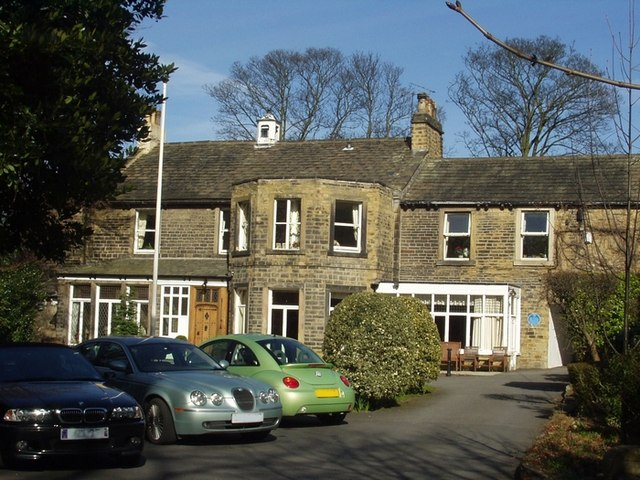
Headingley Hall, Shire Oak Road

According to one source "Headingley has the most important group of large and small villas and mansions in the city." and has more than 100 listed buildings. Parts of Headingley are included in Conservation areas established by Leeds City Council.

Individual listed buildings include St Michael's Church and associated buildings, the Hyde Park Picture House, the Elinor Lupton Centre, Moorfield House in Alma Road and the former St Margaret of Antioch church building on Cardigan Road.

The mid-19th century listed building Spring House in St Michael's Road, Headingley, was the address for VAD nurses during this time; Olive Middleton, great-grandmother of the Princess of Wales, was attached to "Spring House, St Michael's Road, Headingley" when working at Gledhow Hall and elsewhere as a VAD nurse during the Great War. Residing at Spring House were Olive's two sisters-in-law; Gertrude Middleton (1876–1942), a former Oxford University student who also worked as a VAD nurse at Gledhow Hall and her sister Ellen Middleton (1872–1949) who volunteered as "head cook" at Gledhow Hall. Another of Olive's sisters-in-law was Caroline Middleton (1876–1961) who worked as a VAD nurse at the 2nd Northern General Hospital, Leeds. A number of premises were named Spring House in and around Leeds, at times operating as a Home for Friendless Girls in the early decades of the 20th century.

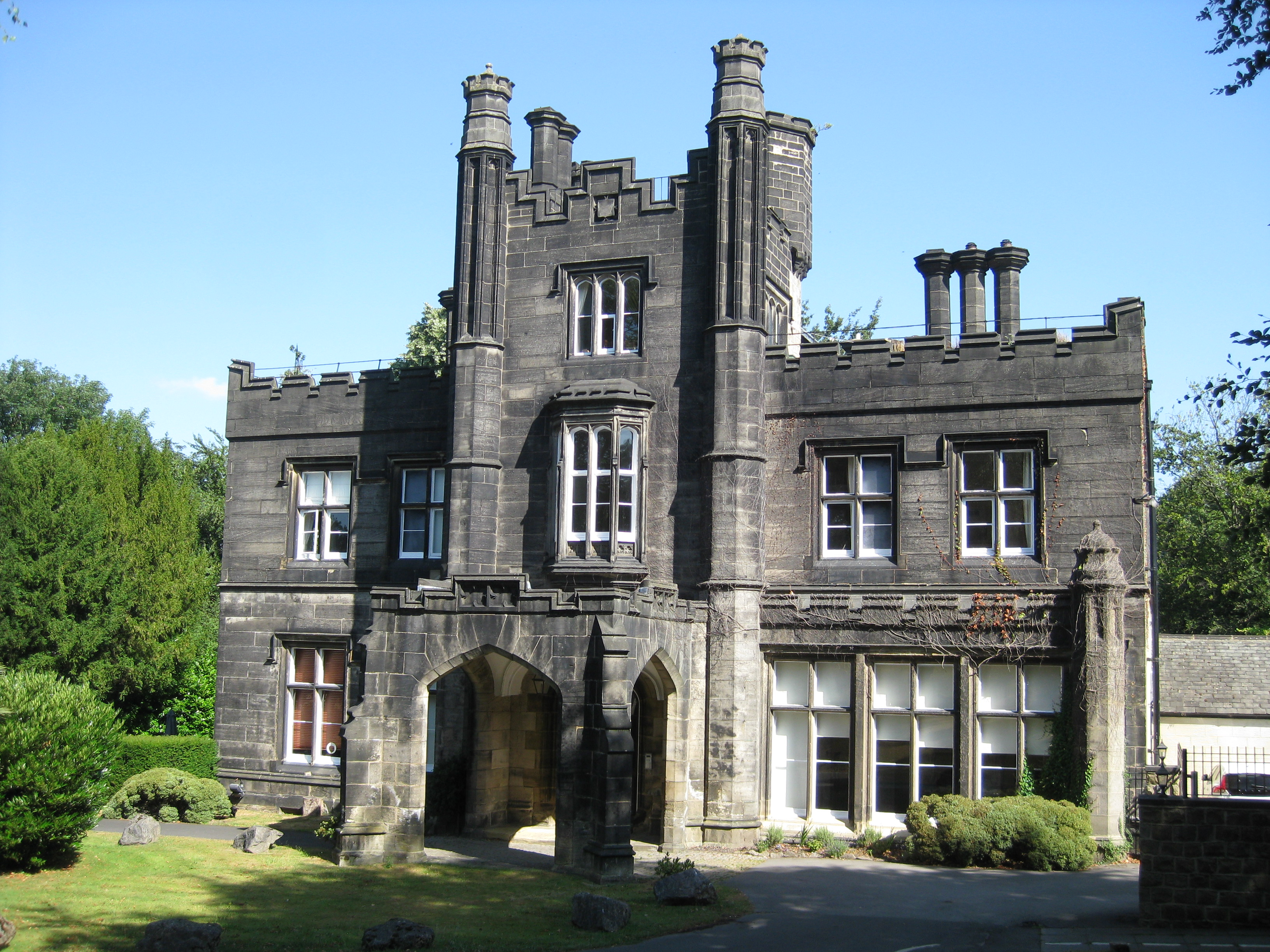
Headingley Castle

Headingley Castle was built in 1846 and was owned in 1866 by cloth merchant Arthur Lupton (1809–1889) of the Lupton family. It was the home from 1909 to 1943 of entrepreneur and art collector Frank Harris Fulford, and later used to house a school for the blind.

Headingley also has a typical example of a 1960s Arndale Centre. Housing in Headingley is generally Victorian and early 20th century and mostly of little architectural note.

== Headingley in media ==
The ITV television series Fat Friends was set in Headingley. Large amounts of the eighties ITV Beiderbecke Trilogy was filmed in and around Headingley and Beckett Park, along with Moor Grange and Pudsey. Parts of Headingley stood in for Northern Ireland in Harrys Game, and A Touch of Frost used locations in the area.

== Gallery ==
Images of Headingley

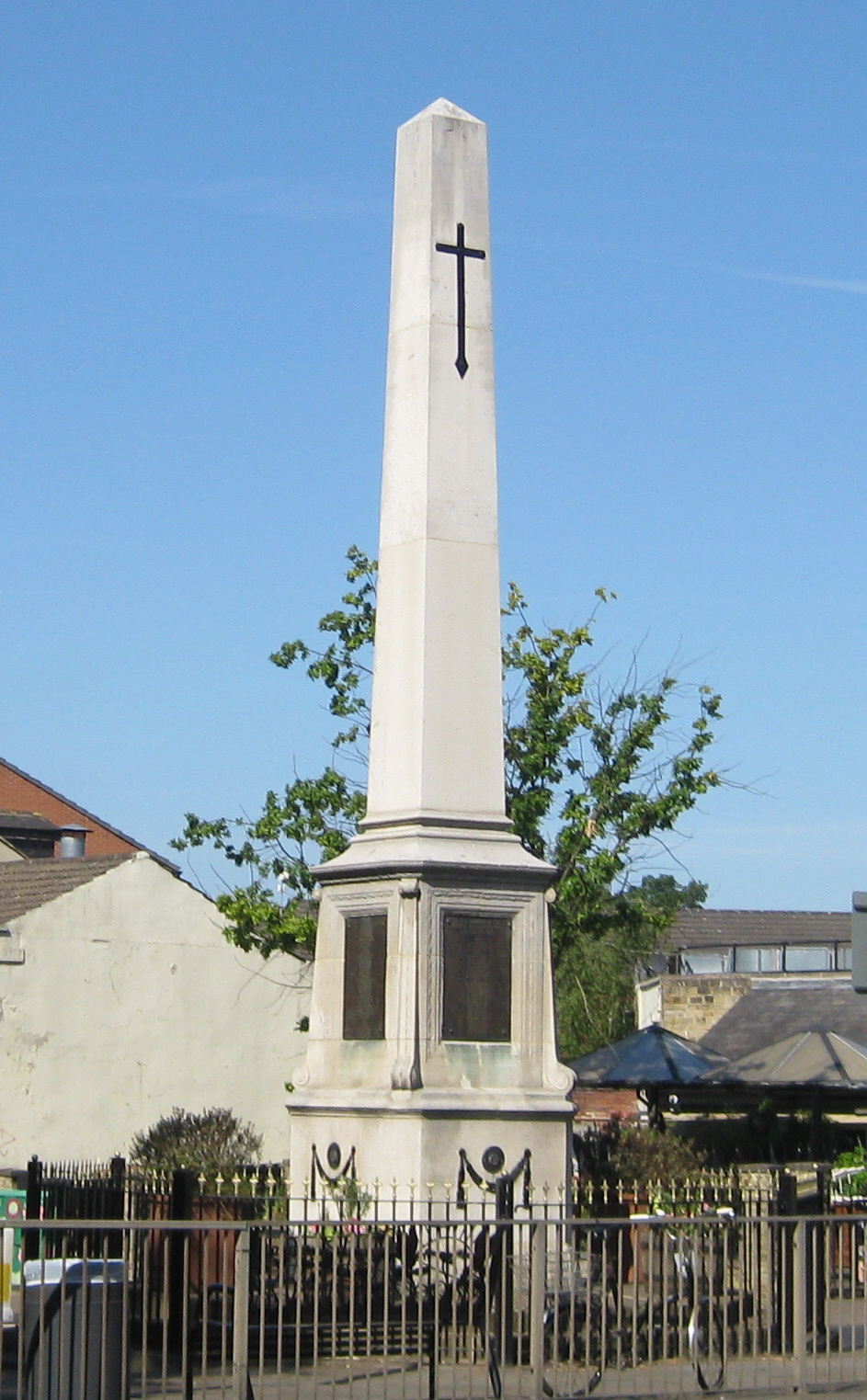
Headingley War Memorial

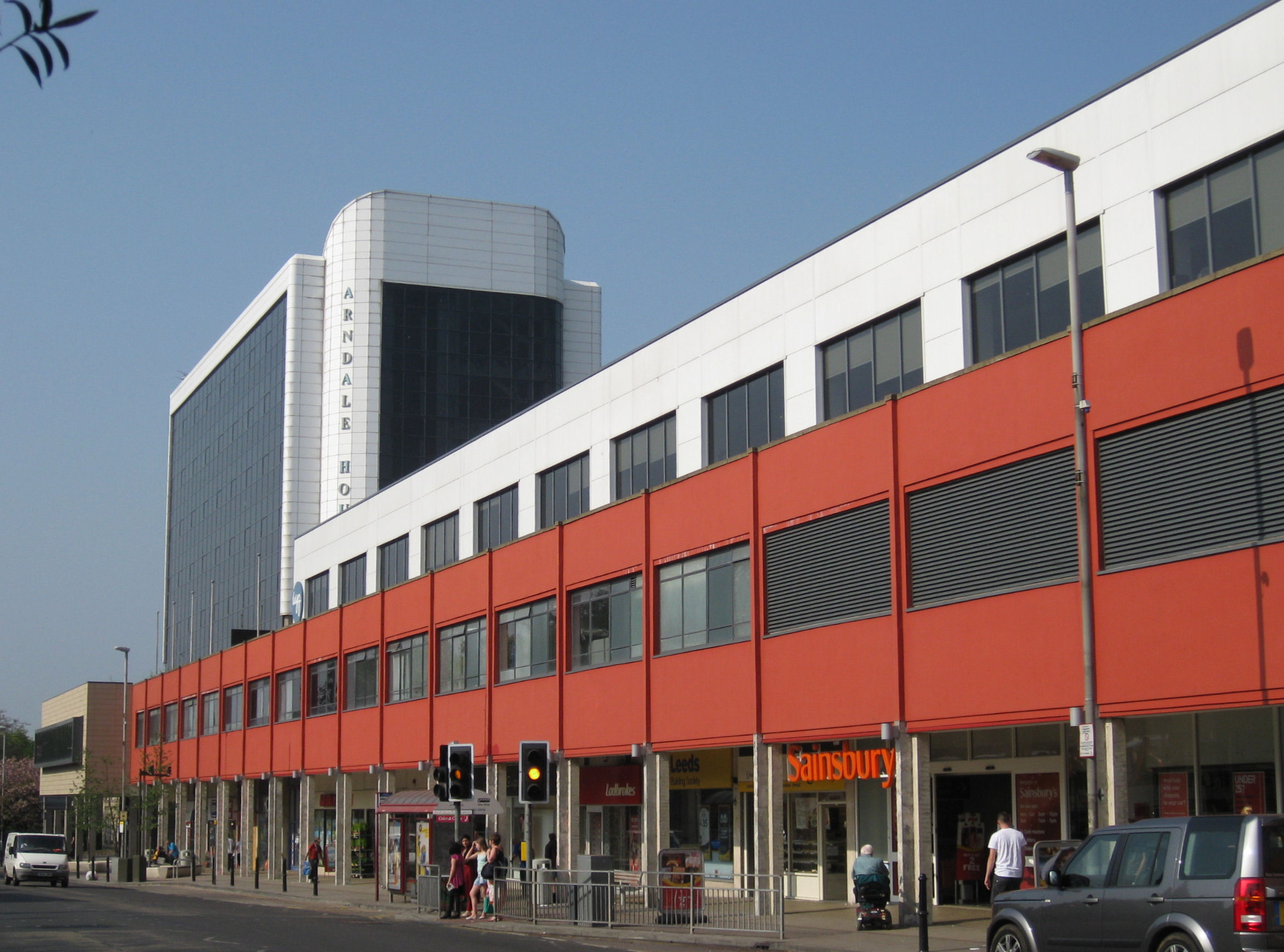
Arndale Centre

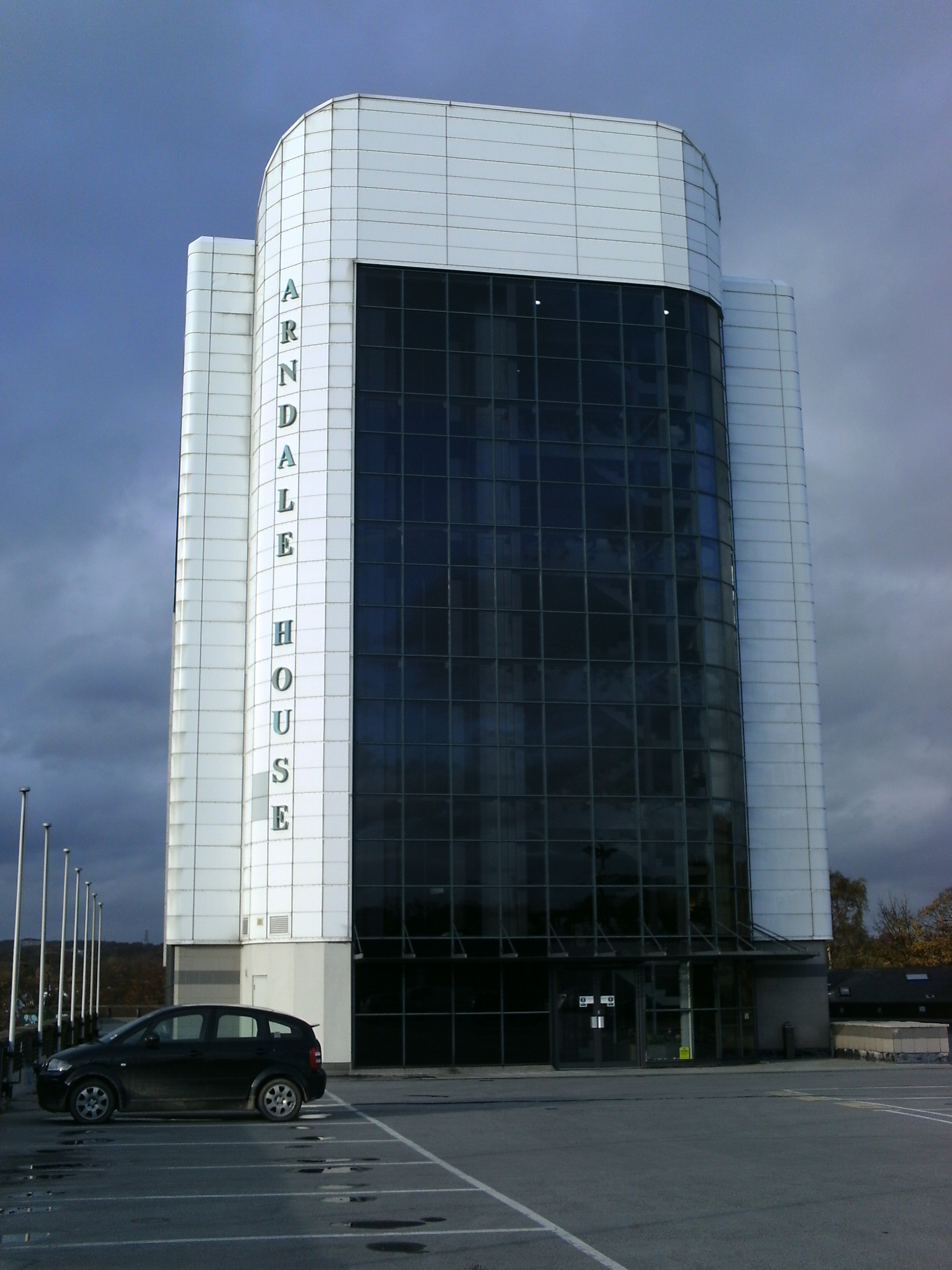
Arndale House, on top of the Arndale Centre, taken from the centre's roof

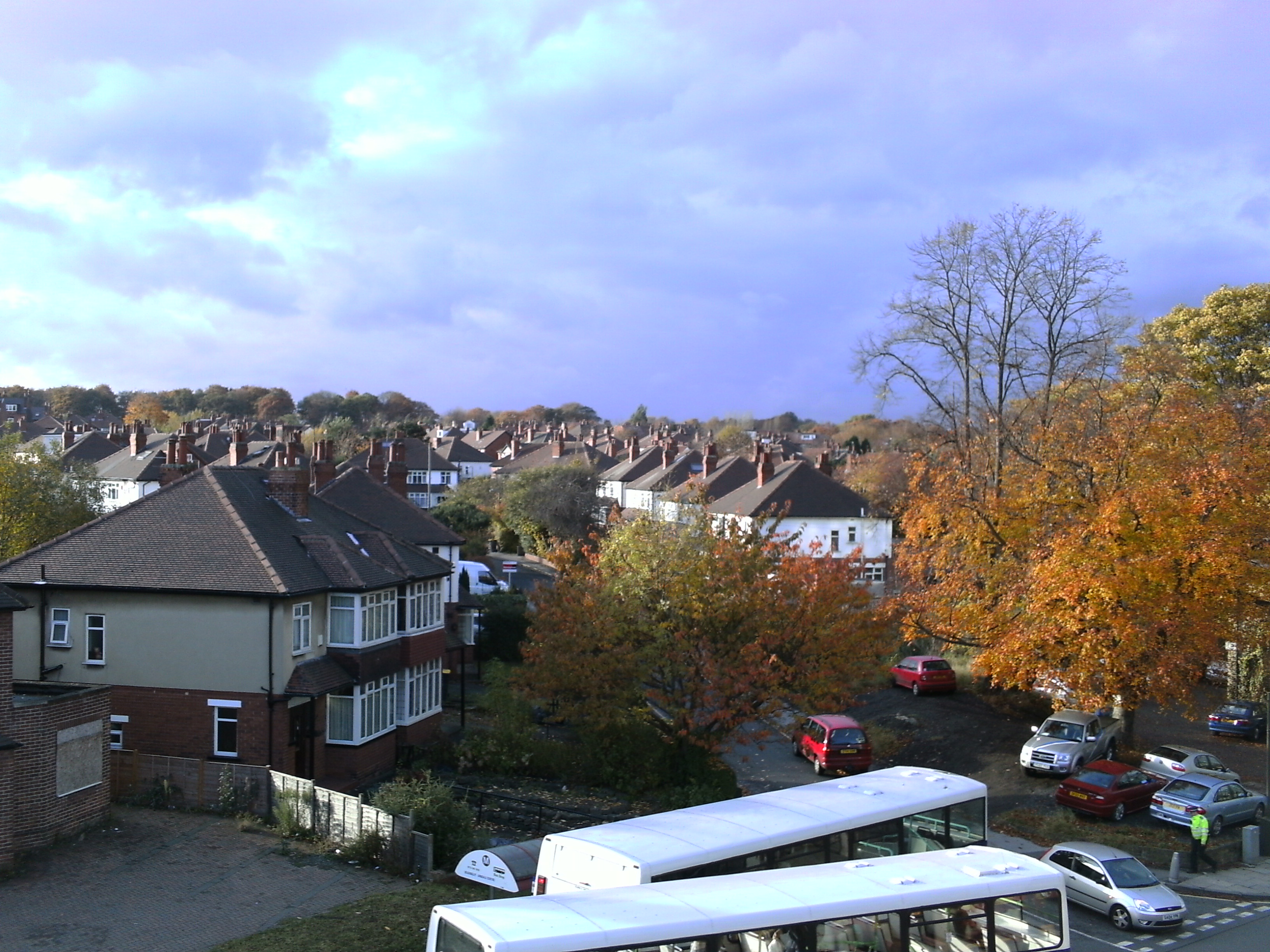
A view of Headingley from the Arndale Centre

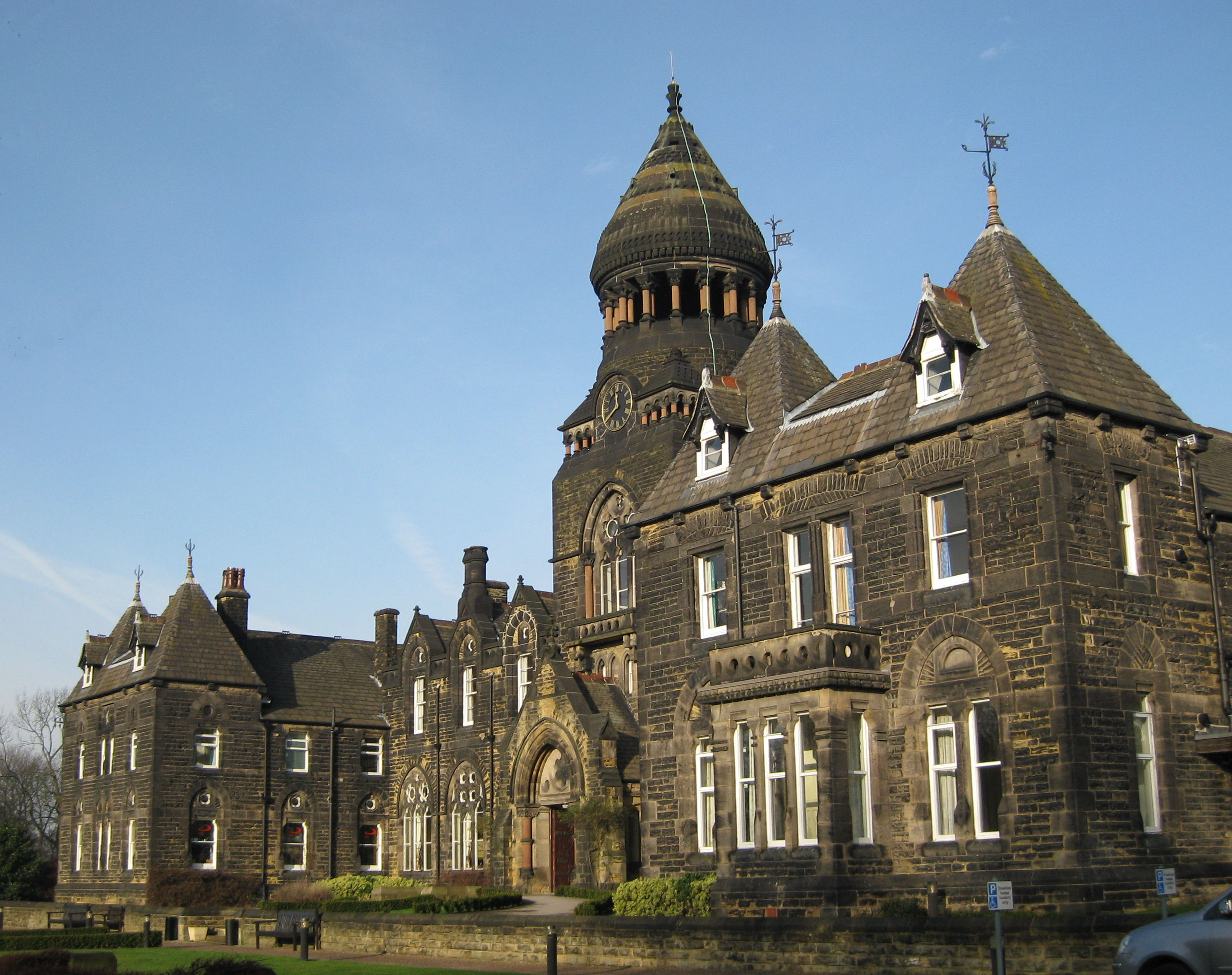
Hinsley Hall (1867)

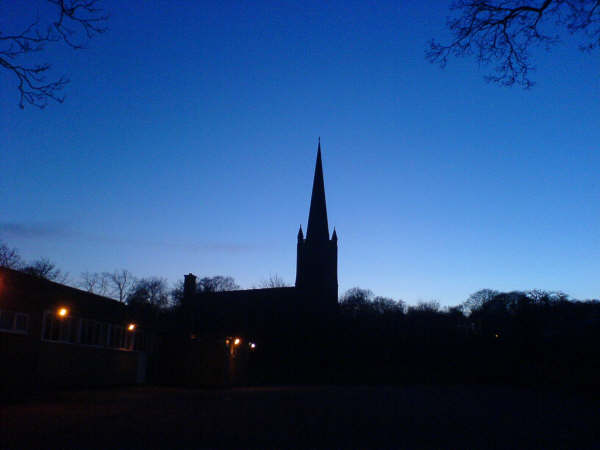
St. Chad's Church at twilight

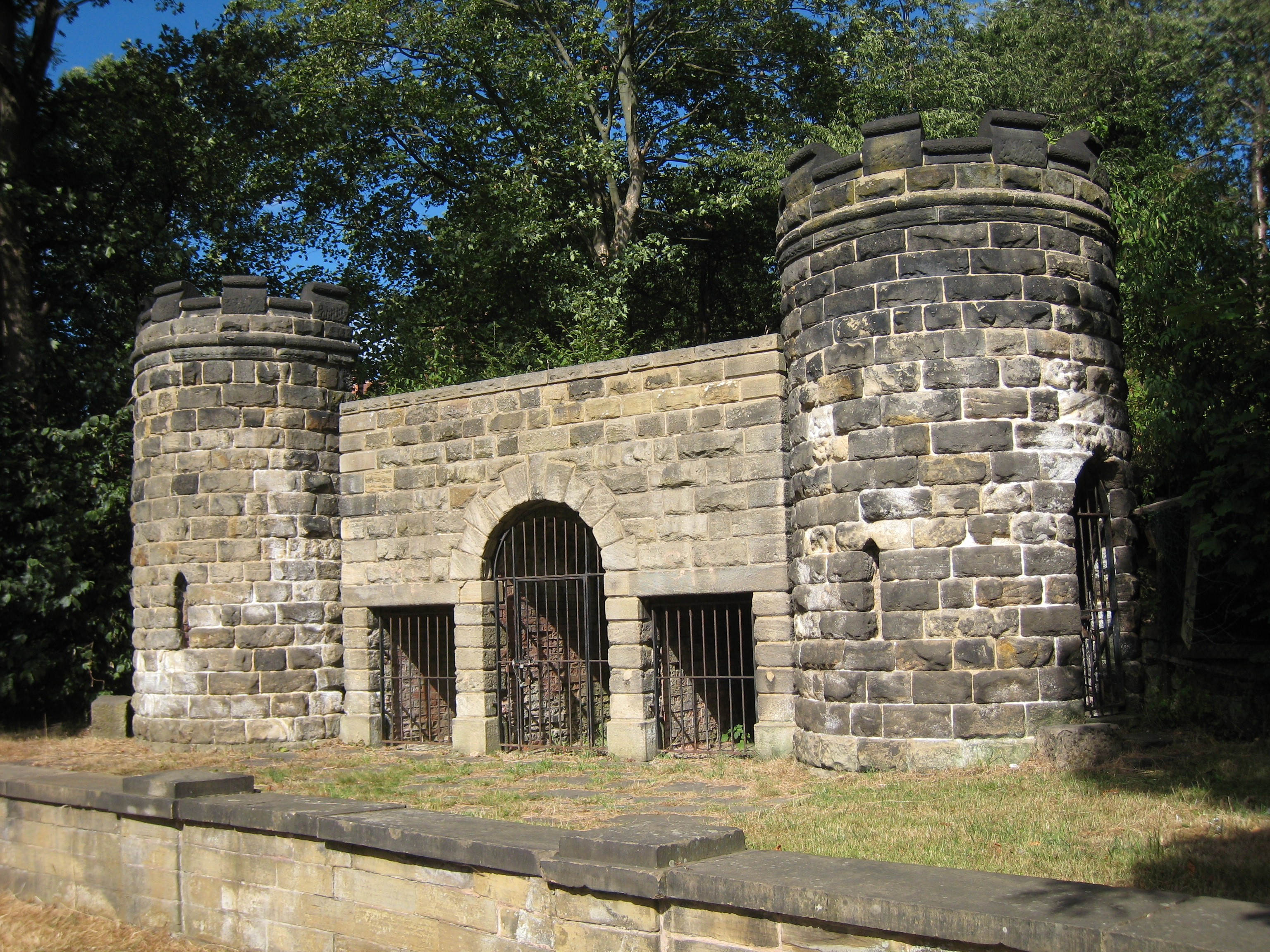
Headingley Bear Pit

== See also ==
- Listed buildings in Leeds (Headingley Ward)
- Elmet
- Otley Run
