= Shire oak =

The English folk legend of a shire oak, under the spreading limbs of which the ancient Anglo-Saxon open-air folkmoots and things were held, is a feature of Merry England:

"In olden times the rude hustings, with its noisy surging crowds, was the old popular mode of appeal to the people, voter and voteless, a remnant of Saxon times when men gathered under the shire-oak..."

The Shire Oak legendarium has resulted in a number of toponyms in present-day England. Oaks were often markers where three shires came together, as "Three-shire Oaks" at some of the tripoints of England, as at Whitwell, Derbyshire.

In Essex, a venerable "shire oak" was identified at Kelvedon. Shire Oak is a section of Mansfield, Nottinghamshire, in which county the Shire-Oak Colliery was excavated near Worksop.

Shire Oak is a suburban area within the Metropolitan Borough of Walsall, West Midlands, recognised by the Ordnance Survey. Shire Oak School is in Walsall Wood, West Midlands, where there is a Shire Oak Quarry and a Shire Oak Reservoir, and there are numerous examples in England of a "Shire Oak Road" or "Shire Oak Street".

Providing a suitably Anglophone toponym, Shire Oak is a neighborhood of San Antonio, Texas and Shireoak Drive is a road in Houston.
