= Thomas Clapham =

19th-century English entrepreneur and politician

Thomas Clapham (1817–1895) was an English entrepreneur and local politician based in Leeds, West Yorkshire. Born in Keighley, he ran a series of attractions and showgrounds aimed at popular appeal during the Victorian era, though each of his ventures ended in financial failure. He began by taking over the ailing Leeds Zoological and Botanical Gardens and later founded Leeds Royal Park, which still has a legacy in the layout and street naming of the Hyde Park residential area. He eventually moved to London and then Hull.

Unable to make his parks and gardens profitable, dogged by debt and creditors, as well as other problems such as disobeying music licensing rules, all of Clapham's properties were foreclosed, sold and redeveloped for housing. Despite this, he remained popular, and served two terms on Leeds Town Council. Clapham was described by the Thoresby Society's Eveleigh Bradford as "a distinctive lively figure, tall and red-haired, sporting tight check trousers; he was a popular character about town". However, he remains relatively unknown in local history, despite his role in the development of north west Leeds; later landowners disliking his being a failed businessman, his eponymous street in Hyde Park was renamed Brudenell Road.

== Leeds Royal Gardens ==
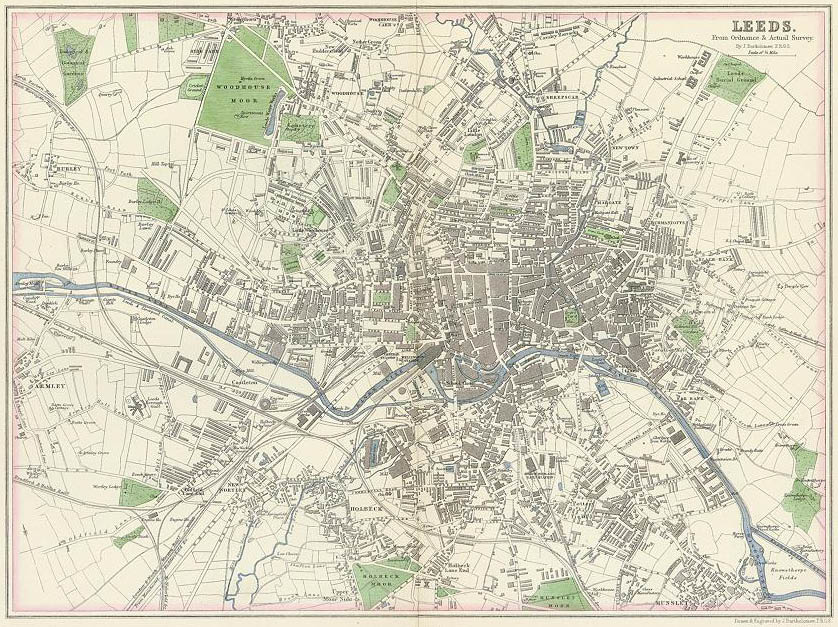
An 1866 map of Leeds showing the Royal Gardens and Royal Park

Thomas Clapham was an investor in the public subscription to found Leeds Zoological and Botanical Gardens in 1837. Due to its original society failing to make it a profitable venture, the Gardens faced closure by 1848. At the age of 30, Clapham was a young entrepreneur with fresh ideas for making the park a success, and offered to take over the running from its new owner, Henry Cowper Marshall, and was granted a lease.

They were then reopened with added attractions such as military bands, firework displays and flower shows. The basis of Clapham's strategy was to change the emphasis of the site from education to entertainment and show, and to take advantage of the new Leeds & Thirsk Railway, which opened in 1849 and brought passengers from Harrogate and Ripon to Leeds, passing right by the Gardens. He renamed it Leeds Royal Gardens and persuaded the railway company to open a station of this name at the southern entrance of the park in Burley. Additionally, Clapham took measures including reducing admission prices to 2d (equivalent to £1.31 in 2023), allowing people to hire it for private occasions, and moving back Sunday opening to 1 o'clock. Despite Clapham's efforts, the reopened park still refused to become profitable and was forced to close for good in 1858, with the land, equipment and animals all auctioned off.

== Leeds Royal Park ==
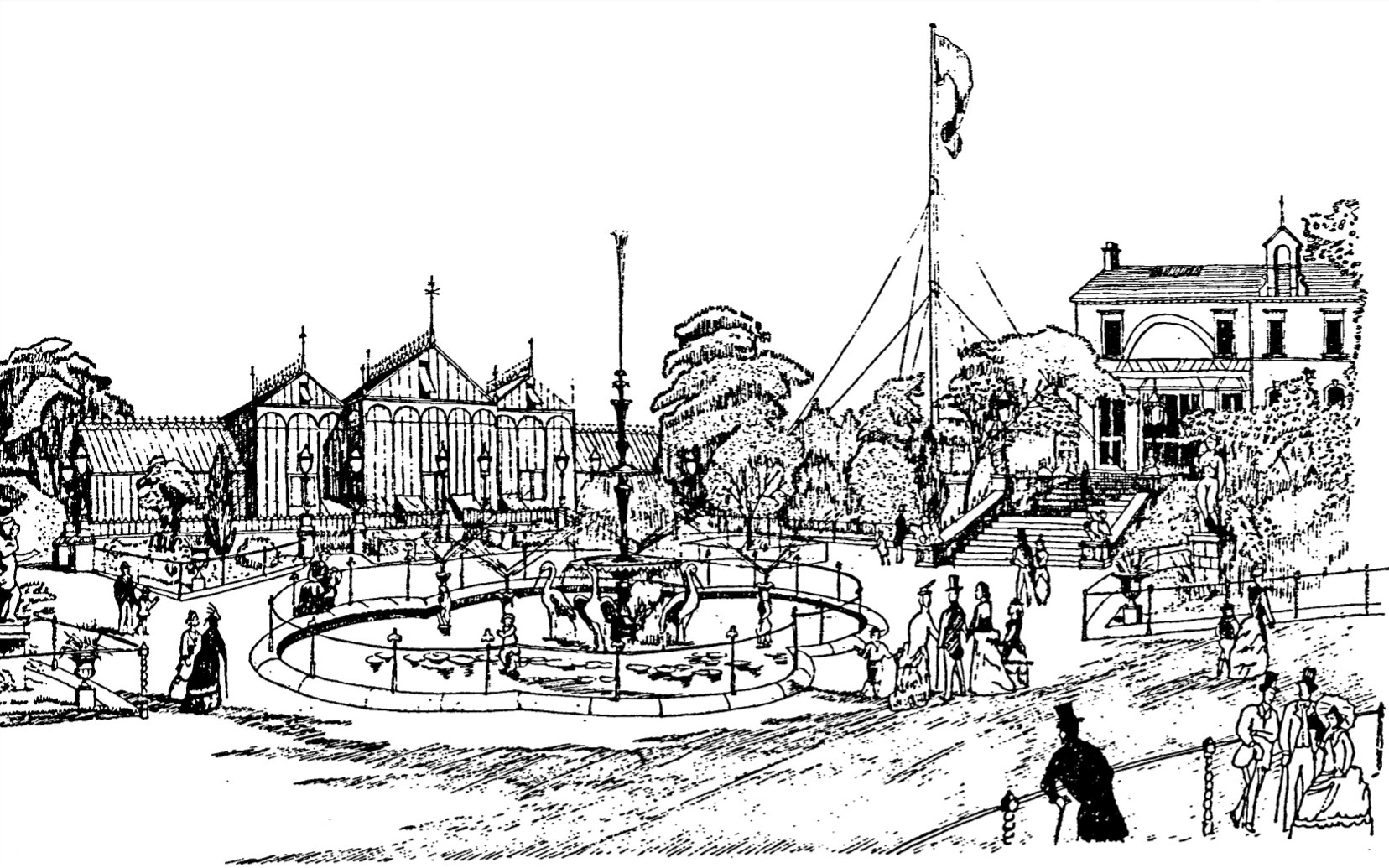
The Royal Park showing the main entrance, conservatory and fountains, from a drawing in 1873

Following the failure of the Royal Gardens, Clapham moved on to a new venture approximately half a mile away in the area which is now the densely populated Hyde Park, but in the mid-19th century was still undeveloped fields adjacent to Woodhouse Moor. In 1858, he purchased 10 acres (0.040 km^{2}) facing the west of the Moor, including the Victoria Cricket Ground, which had staged most of the area's important matches since 1837 and was to be the focal point of his new recreational pleasure ground. Known initially as Leeds New Gardens, the pleasure ground Clapham created on the site featured a more downmarket focus than the Royal Gardens, with cricket, a gymnasium and what was described as "the largest dancing platform in the world". Other attractions included clay pigeon shooting, Punch and Judy shows, hot air balloon rides, and gardens with shrubs, lawns and a conservatory.

The Leeds New Gardens was renamed to the Royal Park in September 1858 in honour of Queen Victoria's visit to Leeds that month to officially open the Town Hall. During the 1860s, the park hosted the Leeds Flower Show on an annual basis, and held sensational paid events, such as on 27 July 1861, when Charles Blondin, who was famous for having crossed the Niagara Gorge, walked a tightrope carrying a man on his back.

By 1866, Clapham owned 43 acres (0.17 km^{2}) of land adjoining Woodhouse Moor and he constructed himself a house next to the park gate, and a new road, named Clapham Road, following the line of an old footpath. Only some 20 acres (0.081 km^{2}) on the site of the original cricket ground were part of the Royal Park; the other land was described as additional recreational areas.

Throughout Clapham's time heading the management of the park, he was dogged by repeated revocations or refused applications for a music and events licence, followed by his repeated running of events regardless; he was regularly convicted by magistrates and given the penalty of a fine.

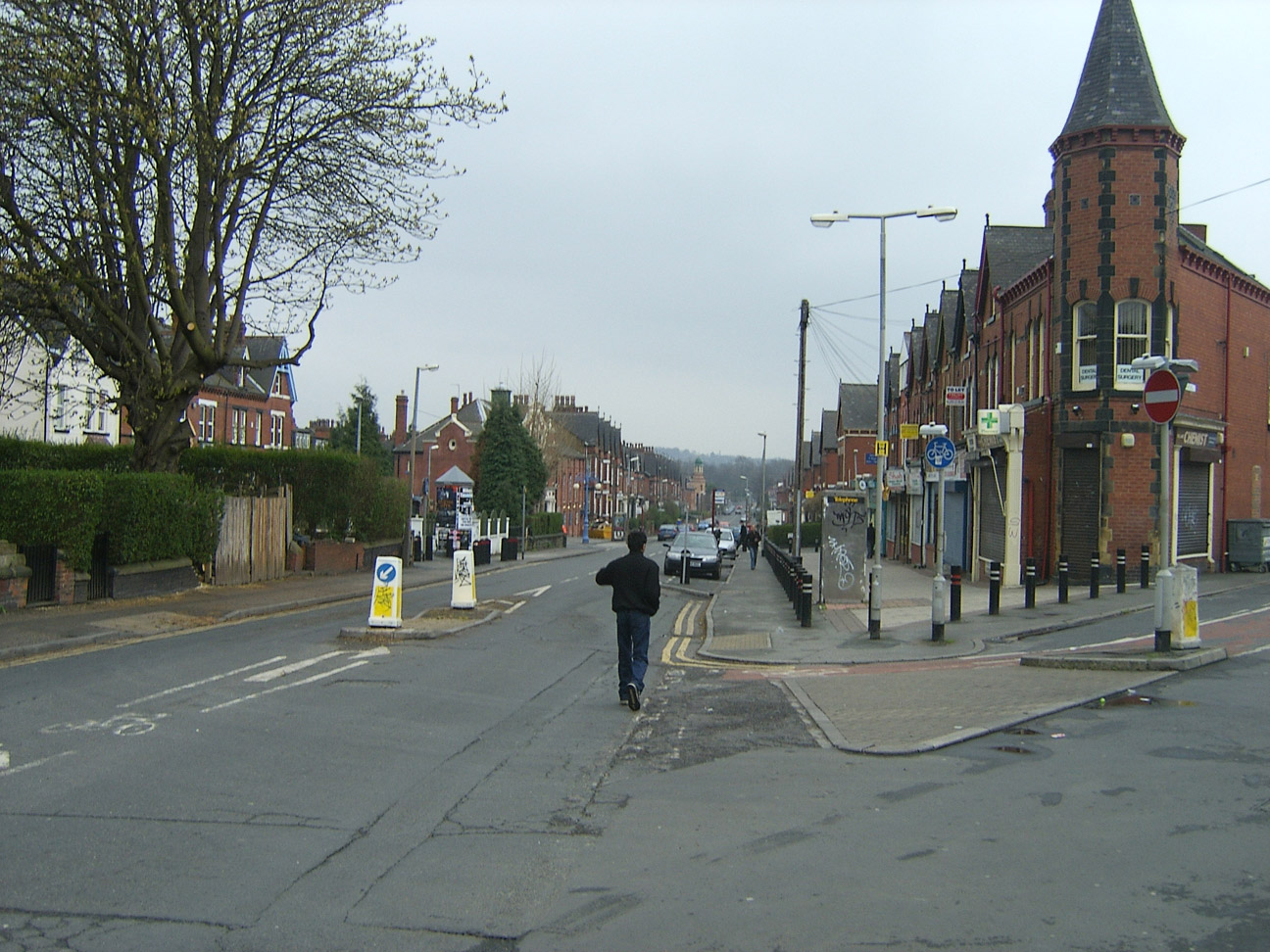
Brudenell Road, which runs through Hyde Park, was originally named Clapham Road.

However, Clapham overreached himself financially – relying on a complicated system of mortgages on which he found difficulty in paying the interest; he expanded his holdings to such an extent that he owed £15,000 (equivalent to £1,755,000 in 2023) to various people on the understanding that the money could not be called in before 1872 – and was forced to make regular land sales after 1866, as the interest alone on his mortgages reached £1,000 per year (equivalent to £117,000 in 2023). He sold off plots for building until 1870, but not the Royal Park itself, although he did attempt to sell it to the city council as a parkland extension to Woodhouse Moor.

From 1870, Clapham and his Royal Park began to be overwhelmed by debt, despite land sales and income from admissions. His attempt to set up a limited company to limit personal losses failed because of the weight of debts Clapham was attempting to shoulder. The park was rapidly losing money, and a meeting of his creditors in July 1871 resolved to order the liquidation of Clapham's estate. This foreclosure resulted in the sale at auction of Clapham's remaining land holdings to various buyers that September. The Royal Park itself was finally sold in February 1874 for £16,500. The lots were described at the time as: "They are situated about one mile from the centre of Leeds in the best locality, and the land unbuilt on is admirably adapted for the sites of residences of a superior class. A very extensive and beautiful view can be obtained from nearly every part of the estate."

After the sale, the site was renamed the Leeds Horticultural Gardens and continued to be used as pleasure gardens until 1885, after which it was sold for housing like the rest of the surrounding plots. The terraced streets that replaced it continue to carry the Royal Park name, though the name of Clapham Road was changed at this point to Brudenell Road, apparently not wishing to commemorate a failed businessman.

== Local politics ==
In March 1851, Thomas Clapham was the chairman of a public meeting in the Court House, Leeds, which sent recommendations to the Royal Commission for the Exhibition of 1851, held later in the year. They suggested firstly that the working classes should be admitted to the Exhibition for the first four days in every week "so that they may derive every possible benefit", and secondly, the reduction of fares charged by railway companies from Leeds to London from 15s 4d to 12 shillings, enabling a greater number to reach the Exhibition.

From 1865, Clapham served two three-year terms as a Leeds Town Councillor, in common with many of the other influential local businessmen of the time, as a Conservative for the North ward. It was reported during the 1865 municipal election campaign that "the district resounded with the noise of vehicles placarded with Mr Clapham's name, and hints of his claims to the support of the working classes." He recorded a majority of 88 (641–553) over his opponent, John Brown Heeles.

Clapham's popularity endured to the next election of 1868, when he beat John Bailiffe (236) and Heeles (60) with 661 votes, a 425 majority. As part of his re-election strategy, he "engaged all the dwelling-houses in some streets as his committee rooms".

While on the council in 1870, Clapham unsuccessfully stood for a position on the fifteen-member Leeds School Board, coming 27th in the list of candidates. At a council meeting in August 1871, two months before the next election, Clapham resigned his office of councillor for the North ward.

== Later life ==
Once the Royal Park had been put up for sale in 1871, Clapham remained as its manager for a time (a period in which he got into more legal trouble for allowing betting on games of knurr and spell on the property), and then moved to London; he became the general manager of the Royal Surrey Gardens in Newington, but was bankrupted due to debts there too, and in 1877 this site was also sold for building development.

After this, he worked as an estate agent, and ultimately retired to Hull with his young third wife, where he died in 1895, aged 78.
