= Royal Park =

Royal Park may refer to:

- Royal Park, Launceston
- Royal Park, Melbourne
  - Royal Park railway station
- Royal Park, South Australia
- Royal Parks of London
- Royal Park Hotel
- Leeds Royal Park
