= Leeds Royal Park =

Pleasure garden in Leeds, Yorkshire, England

Coordinates: 53.8114°N 1.5663°W

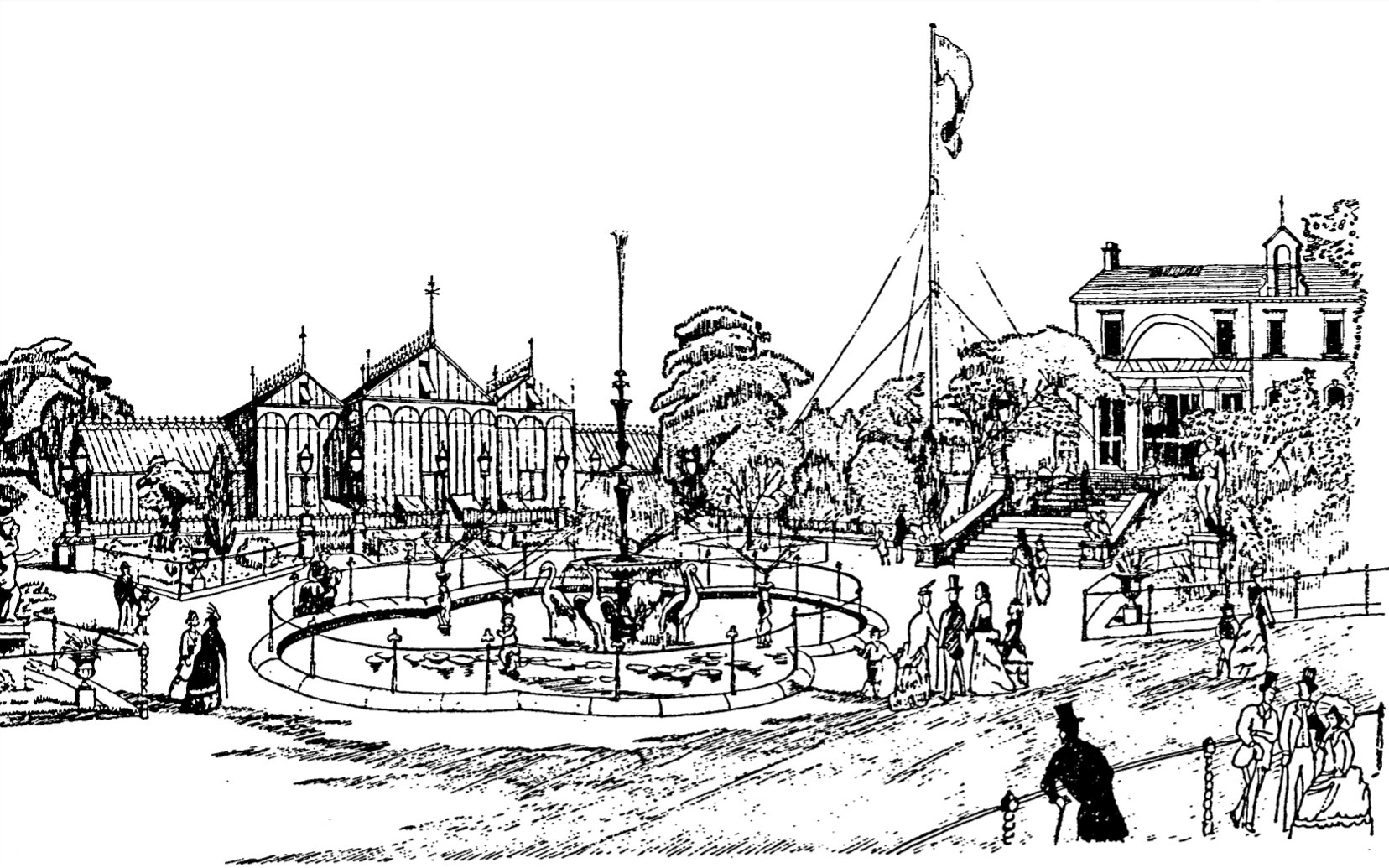
The Royal Park showing the main entrance, conservatory and fountains, from a drawing in 1873

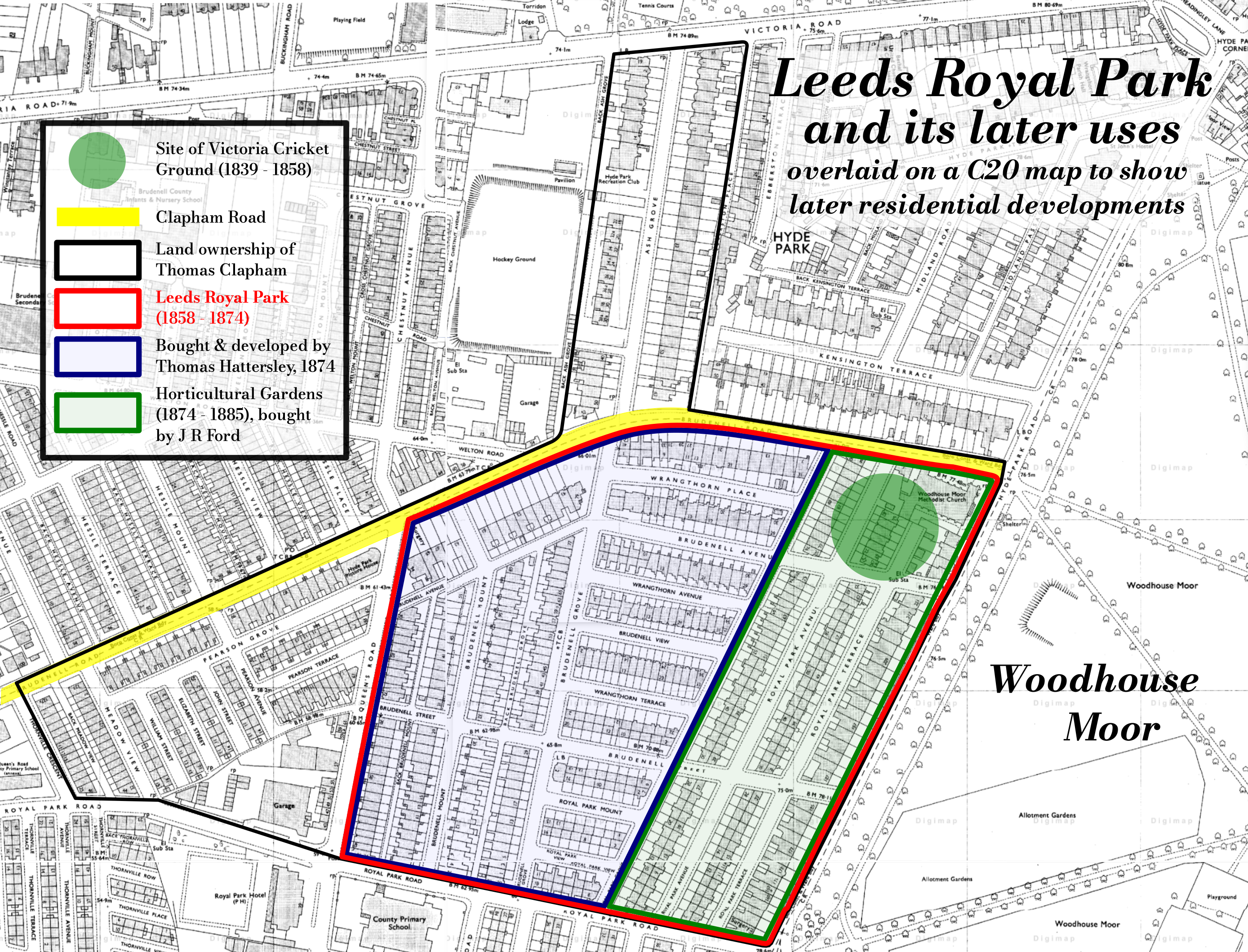
Plan of the Royal Park boundaries overlaid on the housing which replaced it

Leeds Royal Park was a pleasure garden in Leeds, West Yorkshire from 1858 to 1885, located to the west of Woodhouse Moor about a mile out of the city centre. It was established by Thomas Clapham, an entrepreneur and local politician, but like the rest of his ventures it was unprofitable, and was closed and sold in 1874 due to the level of debt built up on its mortgages, after which it was known as the Leeds Horticultural Gardens. The new management company also had problems with debt and it was sold off in plots for housing development from 1885. The site now forms part of the dense residential area of Hyde Park, leaving a legacy in the layout and street naming. The only surviving building connected with the Royal Park is the old entrance lodge, converted into a group of houses facing Woodhouse Moor.

Troubles for the Royal Park were more than financial. Under Clapham's management, repeated violations of local licensing laws for music and events put pressure on funds and reputation. However, it was a popular place for recreation, with cricket, a gymnasium and other attractions including the annual Leeds Flower Show and sensational paid events.

== Founding ==
Thomas Clapham, a Yorkshire investor who had taken over the running of the Leeds Zoological and Botanical Gardens as the Royal Gardens (now the site of Cardigan Road) in 1848, was forced to close it in 1858 due to consistent under-funding, and moved on to a new venture approximately half a mile away in the area which is now the densely populated Hyde Park, but in the mid-19th century was still undeveloped fields adjacent to Woodhouse Moor.

In 1858, he purchased 10 acres (0.040 km^{2}) facing the west of the Moor, including the Victoria Cricket Ground, which had staged most of the area's important matches since 1837 and was to be the focal point of his new recreational pleasure ground. Known initially as Leeds New Gardens, the pleasure ground Clapham created on the site featured a more downmarket focus than the Royal Gardens, with cricket, a gymnasium and what was described as "the largest dancing platform in the world". Other attractions included clay pigeon shooting, Punch and Judy shows, hot air balloon rides, and gardens with shrubs, lawns and a conservatory.

== Operation ==
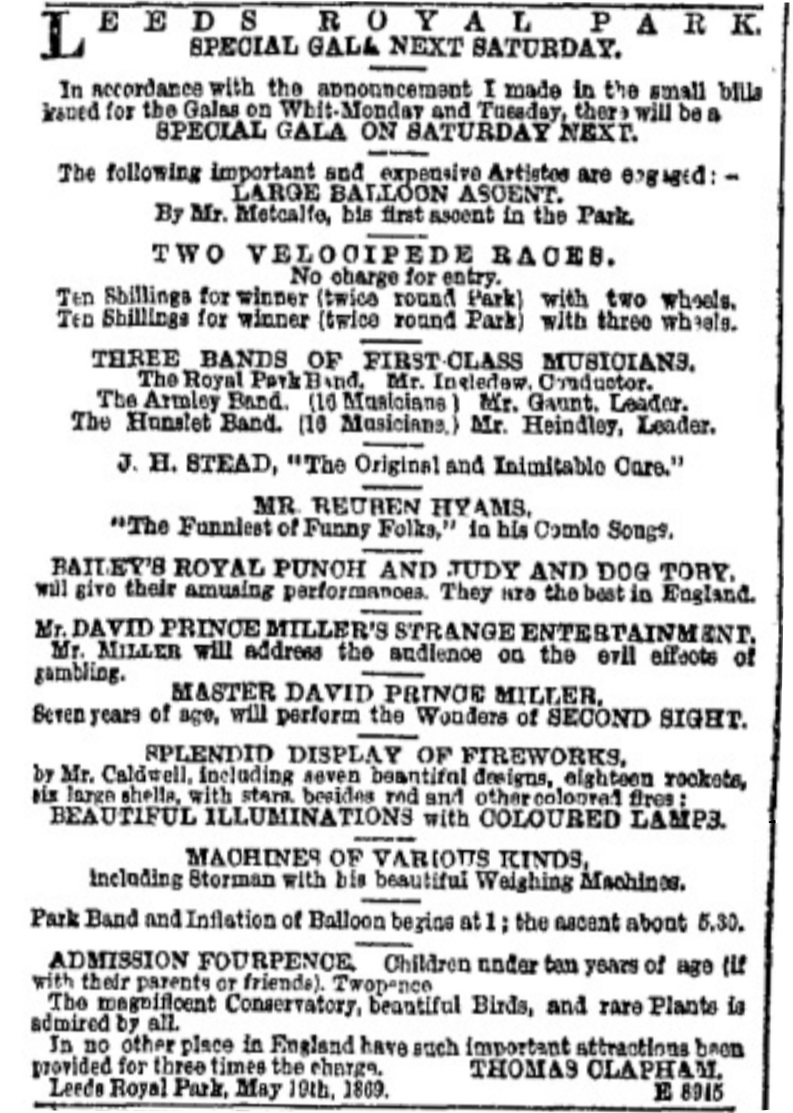
Advertisement in the Leeds Mercury for a special gala at the Royal Park, May 1869

The Leeds New Gardens was renamed to the Royal Park in September 1858 in honour of Queen Victoria's visit to Leeds that month to officially open the Town Hall. During the 1860s, the park hosted the Leeds Flower Show on an annual basis, and held sensational paid events, such on 27 July 1861, when Charles Blondin, who was famous for having crossed the Niagara Gorge, walked a tightrope carrying a man on his back.

By 1866, Clapham owned 43 acres (0.17 km^{2}) of land adjoining Woodhouse Moor and he constructed himself a house next to the park gate, and a new road, named Clapham Road, following the line of an old footpath. Only some 20 acres (0.081 km^{2}) on the site of the original cricket ground were part of the Royal Park; the other land was described as additional recreational areas.

In 1868, a list of elements comprising the Royal Park contained three residences, an entrance hall, a restaurant, picture gallery, refreshment room, music pavilion, menagerie, fountain, cricket ground, volunteer parade ground and recreation ground.

Throughout Clapham's time heading the management of the park, he was dogged by repeated revocations or refused applications for a music and events licence, followed by his repeated running of events regardless; he was regularly convicted by magistrates and given the penalty of a fine.

== Demise ==
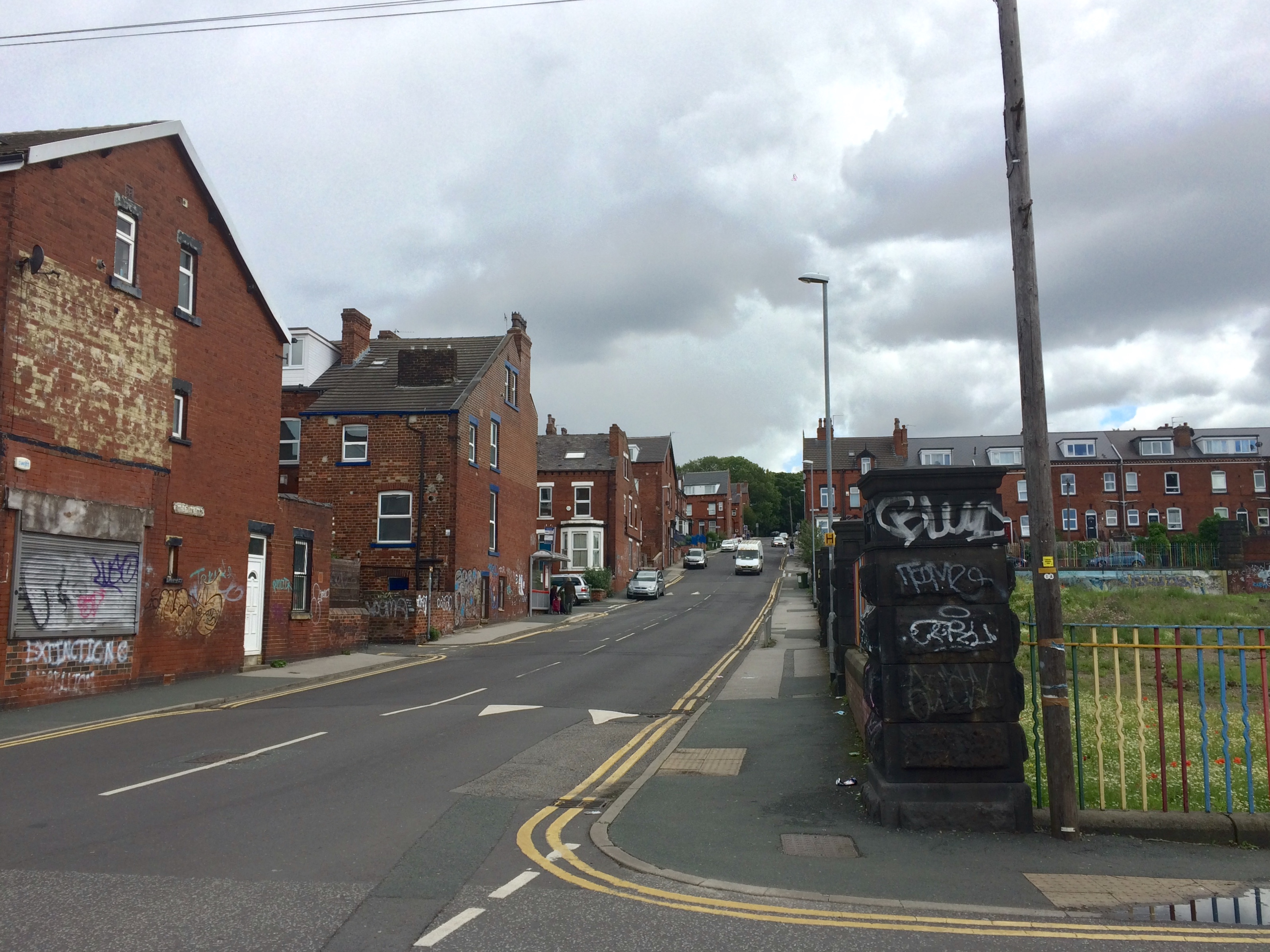
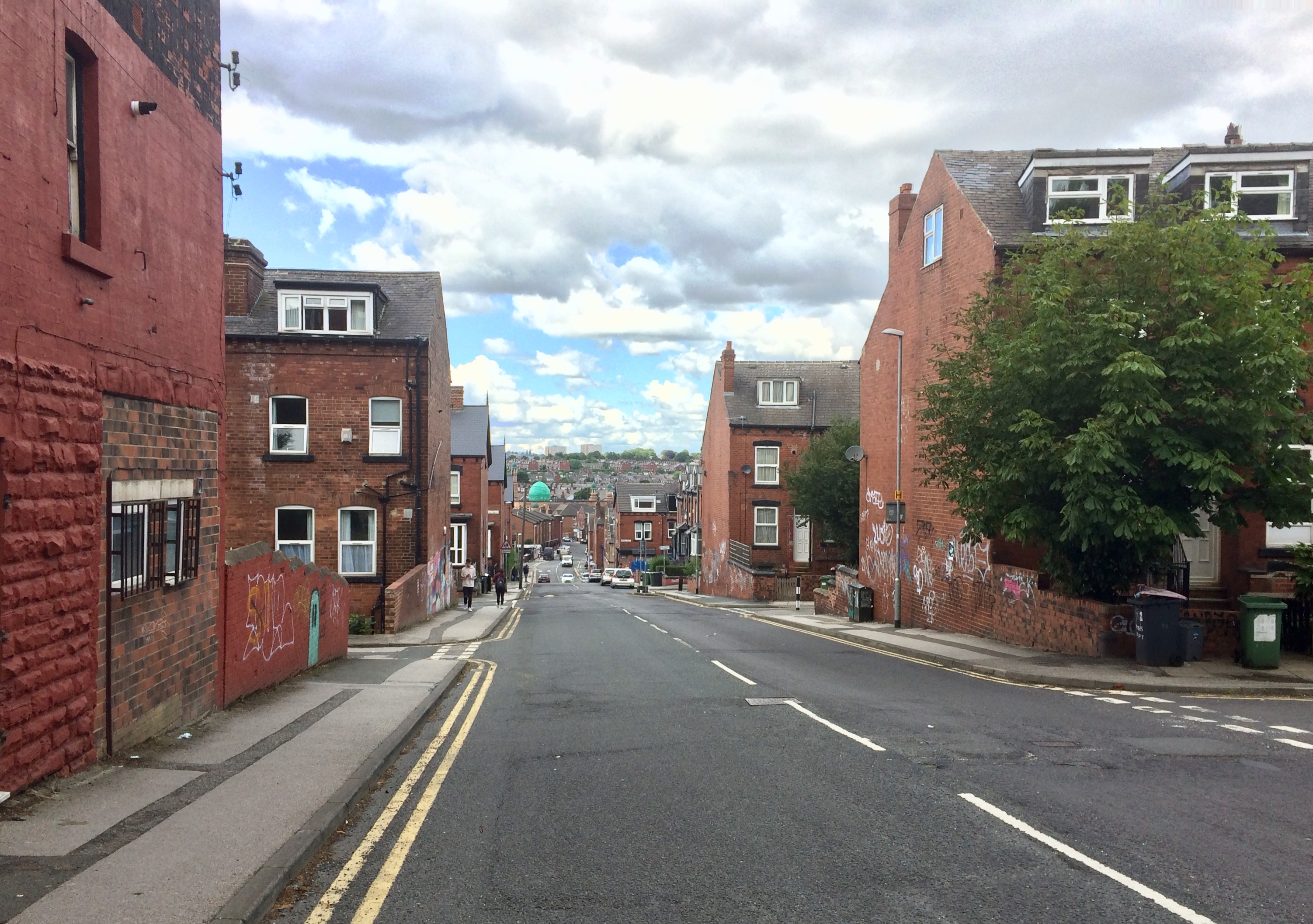
Royal Park Road in 2020, showing the terraced developments on the site of the former Royal Park

However, Clapham overreached himself financially – relying on a complicated system of mortgages on which he found difficulty in paying the interest; Clapham expanded his holdings to such an extent that he owed £15,000 (equivalent to £1,755,000 in 2023) to various people on the understanding that the money could not be called in before 1872 – and was forced to make regular land sales after 1866, as the interest alone on his mortgages reached £1,000 per year (equivalent to £117,000 in 2023). He sold off plots for building until 1870, but not the Royal Park itself, although he did attempt to sell it to the city council as a parkland extension to Woodhouse Moor. Despite his suggestion that also taking land from the Earl of Cardigan may help achieve straight boundaries, the offer was rejected.

From 1870, Clapham and his Royal Park began to be overwhelmed by debt, despite land sales and income from admissions. His attempt to set up a limited company to limit personal losses, intended to be called the Leeds Royal Park Estates Building and Investment Company Ltd, failed because of the weight of debts Clapham was attempting to shoulder. The park was rapidly losing money, and a meeting of his creditors in July 1871 resolved to order the liquidation of Clapham's estate. This foreclosure resulted in the sale at auction of Clapham's remaining land holdings to various buyers that September.

Once the Royal Park had been put up for sale in 1871, Clapham remained as its manager for a time, a period in which he got into more legal trouble for allowing betting on games of knurr and spell on the property. The Royal Park itself, which was not offered as a going concern, was finally sold in February 1874 for £16,500, after sale attempts in 1872 and 1873. The lots were described at the time as: "They are situated about one mile from the centre of Leeds in the best locality, and the land unbuilt on is admirably adapted for the sites of residences of a superior class. A very extensive and beautiful view can be obtained from nearly every part of the estate."

=== After the Royal Park ===
The park, consisting of 20 acres (0.081 km^{2}) of Clapham's land between Queens Road and Hyde Park Road, was purchased jointly by a group of his mortgagees – William Ingham, an upholsterer, Thomas Hattersley, a spindle maker, and Richard Robinson, a linen merchant, all of Leeds. After a year, Hattersley bought the other two out for £3,333 in 1875. In the same year, he sold off the top 10 acres to the newly established Leeds Horticultural Gardens Company for £13,000 to continue in use as a park, and commissioned the Leeds architect Thomas Ambler to lay out the lower half of the estate for housing. The plan showed a network of streets to receive small terraces mainly parallel to Queens Road, which had not yet been sewered or paved, and a number of plots to receive a better class of houses facing Brudenell Road – the original name of Clapham Road was dropped about this time as the Victorians appeared not to like streets named after businessmen who were failures.

The Leeds Horticultural Gardens Company renamed the remaining top half of the Royal Park to the Horticultural Gardens and attempted to keep the ground open and attract new visitors. Its directors included Joseph Conyers, a tanner, Richard Buckton, a manufacturer, Titus Bennett Stead, a druggist, and John Eddison, a well-known land surveyor. The company's purchase was financed by a mortgage from John Rawlinson Ford, a Leeds solicitor.

The company built some new facilities as part of its efforts to attract higher numbers of visitors, such as a cruciform-shaped ice rink designed by James Neill (1875) and an orchestra stand by Charles Fowler (1879). By this time, a stone boundary wall, with entrance gates and an entrance lodge in Hyde Park Road surrounded the 10 acres of horticultural gardens.

In October 1884, the directors of the company put the gardens up for sale by auction. The plans detailing the sale showed an extensive and varied range of attractions: a ballroom, concert hall, refreshment rooms, brewery, vinery, conservatory, lawn, cricket ground, gymnasium, bowling green and skating rink, as well as the main entrance including the manager's house and boardroom.

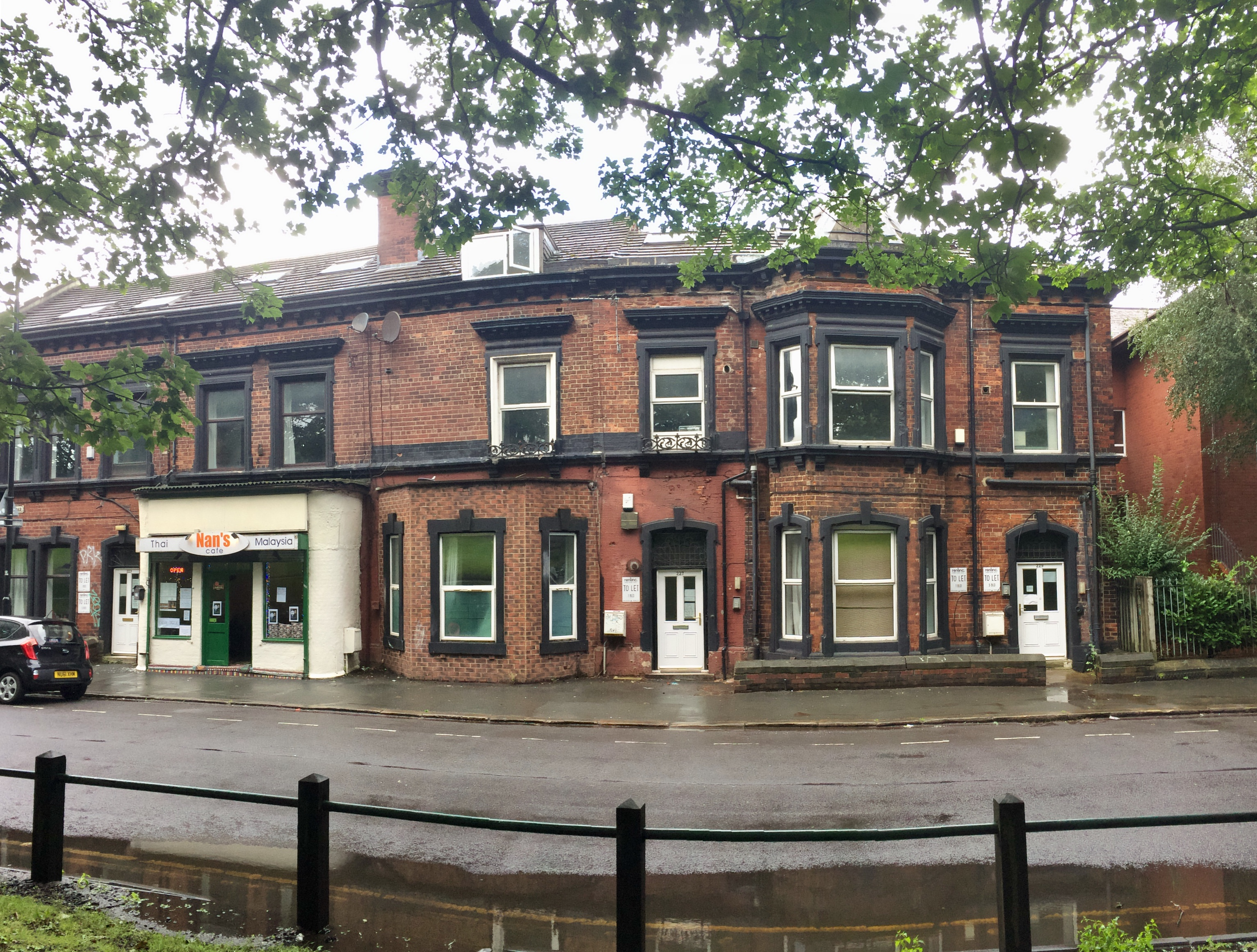
223–229 Hyde Park Road, the original Royal Park entrance lodge

By late 1885, like Clapham before it, the Horticultural Gardens Company was finding it could not meet the debts associated with running and owning the park, and Ford, the financier, agreed to purchase the land and the fixtures, among which were 28 statues and busts. The land was purchased by extinguishment of the mortgage. Ford followed Hattersley in drawing up plans for terraced houses, following a similar pattern to the lower 10 acres already being developed. In 1886, a new wall breaking the gardens into two halves was erected, signalling their end. From then, as plans were approved, plots were rapidly sold and the plants of the gardens soon uprooted to be replaced by bricks and mortar, unlike the section developed by Hattersley, which had prolonged building times.

Ford himself never acted as a housing developer, simply using his position to help potential purchasers, through his business contacts, to get mortgages and meet prospective investors. He also loaned to builders and speculative developers. Only a conversion of the old entrance lodge into two houses and a restaurant was done in his own name; this was done in 1888 by the architect Thomas Winn, involving the filling-in of the central archway, which contained turnstiles and pay boxes, and converting the first-floor ballroom into the restaurant.

In a similar way to the Zoological Gardens, the existence of the Leeds Royal Park created an obstacle to building development in the sense that building took place around it and later it formed a specific estate in its own right. By the time it was finally sold for building purposes it was surrounded on three sides by newly built terraced houses. The only surviving building connected with either the Royal Park or the Horticultural Gardens is the old entrance lodge, now converted again into a group of houses and shops; the outline of the original entrance archway can still be seen on the side facing Woodhouse Moor.

The Hyde Park streets of Royal Park Road, Terrace, Avenue, View, and Mount recall the name, as do the Royal Park public house (c.1920s) and the now-demolished Royal Park School adjacent to the site.
