= Victoria Ground (disambiguation) =

The Victoria Ground was the stadium of English football club Stoke City from 1878 to 1997

Victoria Ground may also refer to:

- Victoria Ground (Leeds), a cricket ground in Leeds, used between 1846 and 1878
- Victoria Ground (Stockton-on-Tees), a football and greyhound racing stadium used by Stockton F.C.
- Victoria Ground (Bromsgrove), current home of Bromsgrove Rovers F.C.
- Victoria Park (Hartlepool), home of Hartlepool United F.C., formerly known as the "Victoria Ground"
- Victoria Ground (King William's Town), a sports ground in the Eastern Cape, South Africa
- Victoria Park Football Ground, Bournemouth, current home of Bournemouth F.C.
- The Victoria Ground, Cheltenham, cricket ground in Cheltenham
