= Headingley Bear Pit =

Grade II listed building in Headingley, England

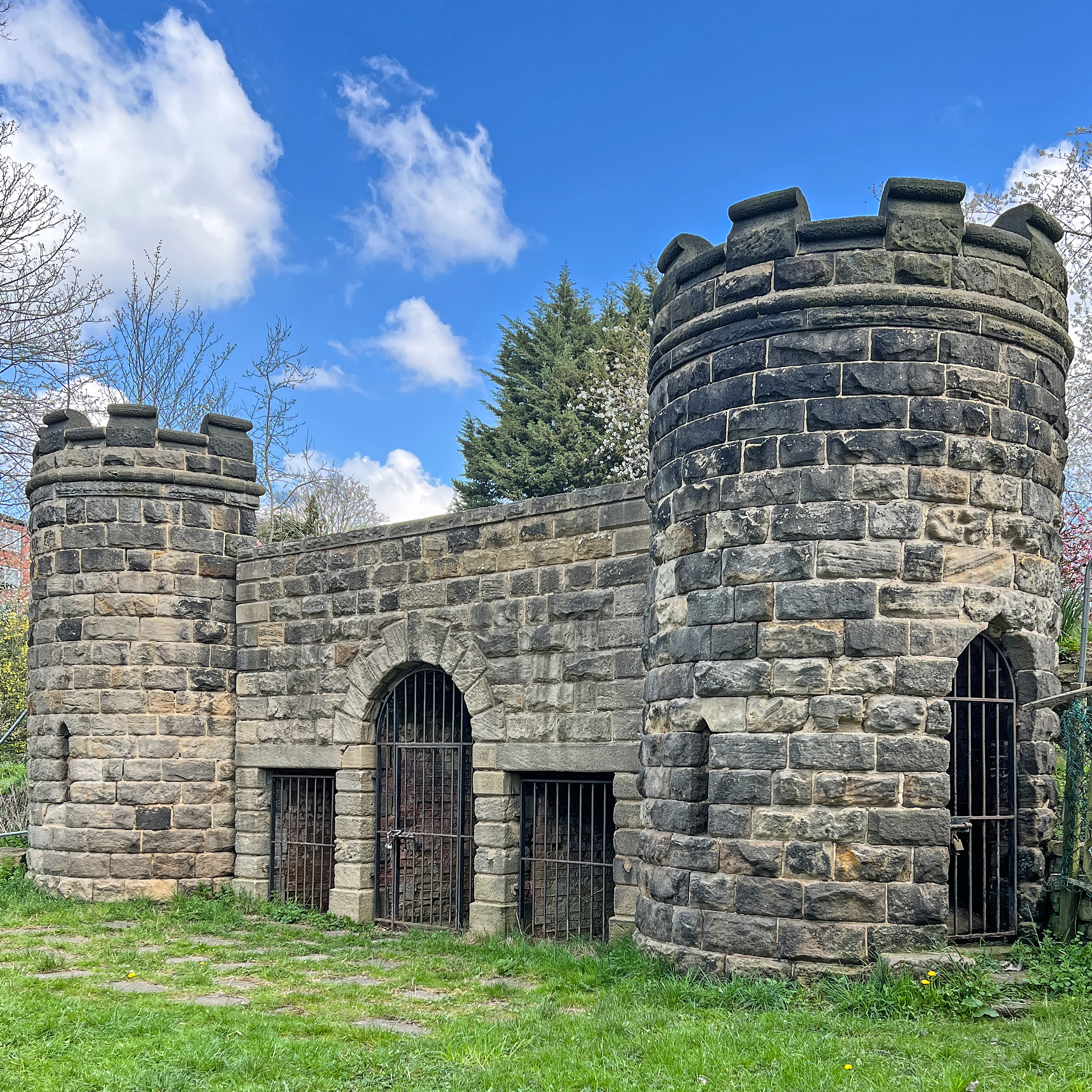

- Location within West Yorkshire
- 53.8152°N 1.5757°W
- Location: Cardigan Road, Headingley, Leeds, England

Site notes
- Architect(s): William Billington, Edward Davies

Listed Building – Grade II*
- Official name: The Old Bear Pit

Headingley Bear Pit is a Grade II listed building (officially listed as The Old Bear Pit) in Headingley, Leeds, England. It was formerly part of Leeds Zoological and Botanical Gardens, which closed in 1858.

== 19th century ==
The Victorian structure, a sham castle facade constructed of rock-faced masonry, consists of two circular castellated turrets with round-arched entrances, linked by a wall with a gateway. On the inside, the circular bear pit is brick-lined and is linked to the facing by two tunnels. The bear was viewed by visitors by climbing spiral steps to the tops of the turrets. Metal railings would have been fixed around the pit, and the bear also had a wooden pole to climb up to be fed sandwiches and buns. The zoo had some smaller cages containing birds, tortoises and monkeys, but the bear pit was the only live animal exhibit. Bear-baiting had recently been outlawed by the Cruelty to Animals Act 1835, so they were kept only for display and scientific study.

== 20th century ==
Purchase and restoration of the Bear Pit was one of the first acts of the Leeds Civic Trust, established in 1965. It was purchased for £128 in 1966 and restored at a cost of £1,000 by 1968.

The Bear Pit is recorded in the National Heritage List for England as a Grade II listed building, having been designated on 5 August 1976. Grade II is the lowest of the three grades of listing, and is applied to "buildings that are nationally important and of special interest".

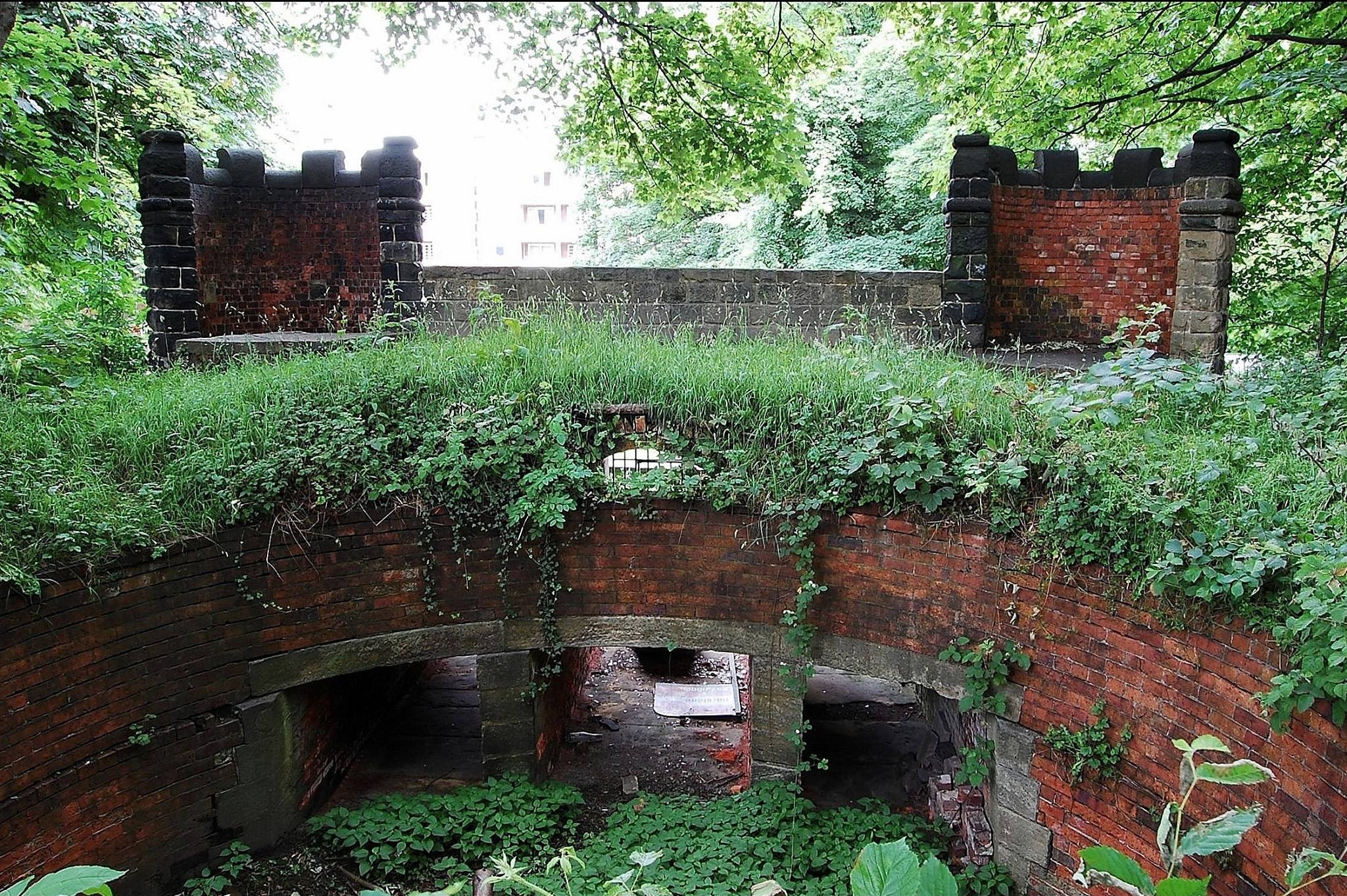
Inside the overgrown circular pit which contained the bear

In 1983, the Civic Trust applied for planning permission to turn the Bear Pit into an open-air theatre, but this proposal was withdrawn. In 2016, the Trust undertook major rubbish clearance and Japanese knotweed treatment.

== 21st century ==
In 2023, it was announced that the Civic Trust planned to restore the structure and open it to the public. The charity said it planned to spend about £100,000 on the project.

In June 2024, The Yorkshire Post reported that the pit was set to open later that summer after its "extensive" restoration.

== In popular culture ==
In 1986, the gothic rock band The Mission, which formed in Leeds, had their first photo shoot at the Bear Pit. In September 2024, the band returned for a new photo shoot, having accepted an invitation to recreate the photo.

== See also ==
- Listed buildings in Leeds (Headingley Ward)
