= Listed buildings in Leeds (Headingley Ward) =

Headingley is a ward in the metropolitan borough of the City of Leeds, West Yorkshire, England. It contains 111 listed buildings that are recorded in the National Heritage List for England. Of these, two are listed at Grade II*, the middle of the three grades, and the others are at Grade II, the lowest grade. The ward is to the northwest of the centre of Leeds, and is largely residential. As Leeds became more prosperous in the 19th century, the area developed to become "the prime residential area of Leeds". Most of the listed buildings are houses and associated structures, many of the houses are large, and some were used later for other purposes. The other listed buildings include churches and associated structures, public houses, remaining structures from the Leeds Zoological and Botanical Gardens, a cinema and lamp post, a war memorial, and a group of telephone kiosks.

Note: the area known as Far Headingley is in the Weetwood ward.

== Key ==
Grade	Criteria
II*	Particularly important buildings of more than special interest
II	Buildings of national importance and special interest

== Buildings ==
Name and location	Photograph	Date	Notes	Grade
Dean's Cottage; 53.81886°N 1.57790°W		17th century	The oldest part is the rear wing, with a Methodist chapel added in the late 18th century, and the building later converted into a pair of houses. It is in gritstone, the front range has a slate roof with coped gables and kneelers, and the roof of the rear range is in stone slate. There are two storeys, and the front range contains a pair of mirror-image houses with two bays each. The doorways are paired in the centre, with fanlights, and the windows are sashes. In the rear range is a sliding sash window, and the other windows are 20th-century replacements.	II
Ivy Lodge; 53.81929°N 1.57486°W		Early 18th century (possible)	A small house that was altered in the 19th century, it is in gritstone with a blue slate roof. There are two storeys and three bays. In the centre is a glazed porch, and most of the windows have been enlarged with 20th-century frames.	II
The Hollies; 53.81868°N 1.57511°W		Late 18th century	The house, which was later extended, is in stone with a slate roof. There are two storeys, three bays, and a later wing on the right. The doorway has a plain architrave, and the windows are sashes. In the right return is a porch and a modillion eaves cornice, and the added wing has a semicircular plan with a sash window in each floor.	II
79, 81, 83 and 83A Otley Road and outbuildings 53.82280°N 1.57941°W		Early 19th century	A row of houses, later offices and a shop, and a possibly earlier range of outbuildings to the left and at the rear. The former houses are in gritstone with bands, moulded gutter brackets, and a slate roof with coped gables. There are two storeys and a basement, and eight bays. To the right is a shop front, the doorways have tie-stone jambs and fanlights, and the windows are sashes. The outbuildings are in stone with stone slate roofs, and their original uses include barns, stables and cottages.	II
11 and 13 St Michael's Road and 1 Sagar Place; 53.81908°N 1.57852°W		Early 19th century	A group of three houses on a corner site, they are in gritstone, with paired eaves brackets, and a hipped slate roof. There are two storeys, six bays on St Michael's Road, and four on Sagar Place. The doorways have rectangular fanlights, and the windows are sashes.	II
76 and 78 St Michael's Road; 53.81947°N 1.58143°W		Early 19th century	A pair of houses in gritstone, with a slate roof, hipped on the left, and with a coped gable on the right. There are two storeys and five bays, the middle bay projecting and gabled, with rusticated quoins. The doorways have semicircular fanlights, the left has a rusticated porch with pilasters, and the right doorway has a pediment on paired brackets. In the middle bay, the ground floor window has a cornice, in the upper floor is a window with two round-arched lights, and the other windows are sashes.	II
Ivy Cottage; 53.82128°N 1.58010°W		Early 19th century	The cottage is in gritstone with a stone slate roof. There are two storeys, three bays, and a rear outshut. In the centre is a porch and a doorway with a plain surround, and the windows are four-pane sashes.	II
North Grange; 53.81735°N 1.56924°W		Early 19th century	The house, which was later extended, is in stone, with corner pilasters, a sill band, a cornice and shallow blocking course, and hipped slate roofs. There are two storeys, and the original part has fronts of five and four bays, The central doorway has a plain surround, a traceried fanlight and a cornice, and the windows are sashes. The extension projects on the right, and has a splayed corner.	II
Garden wall and gateway, North Grange; 53.81706°N 1.56906°W		Early 19th century	The wall encloses the garden on the south and east sides, and is in stone with rounded coping. It extends for about 100 metres (330 ft), and varies in height. The wall contains a square pier with a moulded capstone, and a pedestrian gateway that has square gate piers, each with a moulded base, a cornice, and a pyramidal capstone with a finial.	II
The Original Oak Public House; 53.81962°N 1.57589°W		Early 19th century	The public house is in gritstone, with a sill band, and a hipped slate roof. There are two storeys and three bays. In the centre is a doorway, the windows are tripartite sashes, and in the right return is a two-storey semicircular bay window.	II
The Skyrack Public House; 53.81976°N 1.57651°W		Early 19th century	The public house is in gritstone, with quoins, and a slate roof. There are two storeys, three bays, and a recessed bay on the left. The central doorway has a rectangular fanlight, and the windows are sashes.	II
Virginia House and pump 53.81736°N 1.56858°W		Early 19th century	The house is in gritstone, with a sill band, a moulded eaves cornice, a blocking course, and a hipped slate roof. The main block has two storeys and four bays, the outer bays recessed. The porch has Doric pillars, to the left is a shallow bay window, and the other windows are sashes, some with canopies. At the rear is a three-storey three-bay wing with a curved bay window and a two-storey canted bay window. Attached to the wall is a wooden casing enclosing a cast iron pump.	II
Garden wall, gate piers and steps, Virginia House; 53.81725°N 1.56889°W		Early 19th century	The wall encloses the garden on the south and west sides, and is in gritstone with rounded coping. It extends for about 100 metres (330 ft), and varies in height. The gate piers are in sandstone with a square section, each on a moulded plinth, with recessed panels containing a carved flower in a roundel, a moulded cornice and entablature, and a gabled capstone. There is a flight of seven steps with flanking walls and end piers with moulded capstones.	II
Highfield House; 53.81735°N 1.56808°W		c. 1830	A house later used for other purposes, it is in stone, with a sill band, an eaves cornice, a blocking course, and a hipped slate roof. There are two storeys and five bays, the outer bays recessed. In the centre is a porch with Tuscan columns, an entablature and a cornice, and flanking it are segmental bow windows with Tuscan pilasters and cornices. The other windows have plain lintels.	II
Muir Court; 53.81891°N 1.57902°W		c. 1830	A stone house that has a slate roof with coped gables. There are two storeys and three bays. The central doorway has a reeded architrave, a rectangular fanlight, and a cornice, and the windows are sashes in plain architraves.	II
Headingley Parish Hall; 53.81909°N 1.57726°W		1834	Originally a school, later the parish hall, it is in gritstone, and has a stone slate roof with coped gables and kneelers. There is a single storey, and fronts of five and two bays. The windows in the front are mullioned and transoms under gables. In the right return is a window with a four-centred arch and Perpendicular tracery. On the roof is a bellcote with a pyramidal roof.	II
Holmfield; 53.81728°N 1.56712°W		1835	A stone house in Tudor style that has a slate roof with moulded gable copings. There are two storeys, and a front of two gabled bays. In the right bay is a canted oriel window with a shield above, and the other windows have chamfered surrounds and hood moulds.	II
Wall, gate piers, gate and overthrow, Holmfield; 53.81704°N 1.56704°W	—	c. 1835	The wall is in gritstone with rounded coping, it is about 2 metres (6 ft 7 in) high, and extends along the boundary for about 100 metres (330 ft), and contains a pedestrian gateway, The gate piers are monolithic, about 2.5 metres (8 ft 2 in) high, with round-arched insets, and stepped pyramidal capstones. Attached is a wrought iron gate and a curved overthrow with scroll decoration and a square lantern frame.	II
Ashwood; 53.81720°N 1.56648°W		c. 1836	A stone house on a plinth, with moulded string courses at first floor and eaves levels, and a moulded blocking course. There are two storeys and a basement, and the house is in Tudor style. The entrance front has three bays, the middle bay projecting and gabled. The central doorway has a fanlight with an ogee arch and a hood mould, and above it is an oriel window. Octagonal buttresses rise to form moulded and embattled chimneys, and to the right is a bay window. In the left return are four bays, and two canted bay windows, and in the right return is an oriel window. The windows contain Perpendicular tracery.	II
Gate piers and wall, Ashwood; 53.81643°N 1.56669°W		c. 1836	The wall along the front of the garden is in gritstone with chamfered coping, it is about 2 metres (6 ft 7 in) high, and it extends for about 30 metres (98 ft). The gate piers are octagonal and have moulded pyramidal capstones.	II
63 Victoria Road; 53.81447°N 1.56807°W		1838	A house later extended and divided, it is in red-brown brick with a hipped slate roof. There are two storeys, a symmetrical south front of three bays, and a two-bay service wing added to the west. The doorway has reeded pilasters, an entablature, and a cornice, and the windows are sashes with slightly cambered heads. At the rear is a round-headed stair window over a doorway.	II
Retaining wall, Leeds Zoological and Botanical Gardens; 53.81686°N 1.57764°W		1838	Part of the retaining wall, now a garden wall on a corner, it is in gritstone with later coping, about 2.5 metres (8 ft 2 in) high and 25 metres (82 ft) long. At the former entrance are piers, each with a modillion cornice and a square capstone. Elsewhere, there are recessed panels and pilasters.	II
Hilly Ridge House; 53.81909°N 1.56255°W		1839	The house, which was extended in the 20th century, is in stone with a sill band, bracketed eaves, and a hipped slate roof. There are two storeys and three bays, and a later single-storey range on the left. The central doorway has pilasters and an entablature, and the windows are sashes with plain lintels.	II
Gate piers, gates and railings, Hilly Ridge House; 53.81884°N 1.56303°W		c. 1839	There is a pair of gate piers and outer piers, all in stone with a square section. Each pier is about 2.5 metres (8 ft 2 in) high, it is slightly tapered, and has a pedimented cap. The gates and railings are in wrought iron, and the railings are on low walls with moulded coping.	II
Hilton Court; 53.81722°N 1.56673°W		c. 1840	A stone house with a blocking course, a cornice, and a hipped slate roof. There are two storeys, a front of three bays, four bays on the left return, and a rear stable wing with six bays. The centre bay at the front is recessed, with two Ionic columns in the ground floor, two square columns in the upper floor, a balustraded balcony, and an entablature. The windows are casements, in the ground floor they have a continuous cornice on console brackets, and in the upper floor they have moulded architraves. In the stable wing is a wide segmental arch.	II
Garden terrace, walls and gateway, 2 Hilton Court; 53.81696°N 1.56697°W		c. 1840	The terraces to the south of the house are enclosed by walls extending for about 125 metres (410 ft). The terrace wall is about 0.5 metres (1 ft 8 in) high and has rounded coping, and piers with pedimented caps. The boundary wall also has rounded coping and contains a gateway.	II
Wall, gates and gate piers, 17 North Hill Road; 53.81962°N 1.56629°W		c. 1840	The front garden wall and the two pairs of gate piers are in stone. The wall has gabled coping, it is about 1.5 metres (4 ft 11 in) high, and extends for about 35 metres (115 ft). The gate piers are square and have overhanging pyramidal capstones, and the gates are in wrought iron.	II
Buckingham House; 53.81671°N 1.57036°W		c. 1840	A house that was later extended and used as offices, it is in gritstone with corner pilasters, bands, an entablature, a cornice, a blocking course, and a hipped slate roof. The main part has two storeys and fronts of three and five bays, and there are single-storey four-bay rear wings, giving a U-shaped plan. In the centre is a porch with Ionic columns, an entablature, a cornice and blocking course, and the doorway has a cornice on console brackets. The windows are sashes, and in the right return is a pedimented bay window.	II
Cumberland Priory; 53.81905°N 1.56443°W		c. 1840	A stone house with quoins, corbelled eaves, and a coped slate roof with kneelers. There are two storeys and an attic, three bays, and a rear wing. The middle bay projects, it is gabled, and contains a doorway with a moulded depressed arch, above which is an oriel window. The other windows are mullioned with hood moulds, and in the left return is a canted bay window.	II
Wall and gate piers, Cumberland Priory; 53.81902°N 1.56422°W		c. 1840	The front wall enclosing the garden is in gritstone with rounded coping, and is about 1.2 metres (3 ft 11 in) high and 30 metres (98 ft) long. There are two pairs of gate piers, each with a square section and chamfered corners, and those flanking the pedestrian entrance have moulded caps.	II
Grosvenor House and walls 53.81727°N 1.56324°W		c. 1840	A stone house, later used for other purposes, it has rusticated corner pilasters, a string course, eaves console brackets and a hipped slate roof. There are two storeys and a basement, a front of three bays, and four bays along the left return. In the centre of the front is a porch and a doorway with a rusticated surround and an entablature on fluted columns with decorated capitals. The windows are casements, those in the ground floor with rusticated architraves and hoods on consoles, and in the upper floor they have plain surrounds, iron balconettes, and aprons with Greek key decoration. In the first two bays of the left return is a bay window with a pulvinated frieze and cornice; the other windows are similar to those on the front. To the south is a terrace wall linking to the boundary wall, and steps.	II
Headingley Terrace; 53.81622°N 1.56459°W		c. 1840	A terrace of five stone houses with chamfered quoins, wide bracketed eaves, and a slate roof. There are two storeys and attics, and five bays, the outer and central bays projecting and gabled. Steps with iron railings lead up to each house, and there are three entrances with Tuscan columns and an entablature. The windows in the projecting bays are casements with cornices on console brackets, the windows in the other bays are sashes, and in the attics are small round-headed windows.	II
Oakfield; 53.81910°N 1.57196°W		c. 1840	A stable and coach house converted for residential use in about 1990. The building is in stone with a sill band and a hipped slate roof. There are two storeys and seven bays, the middle bay recessed. To the right is a segmental-arched carriage door, the doorways have stable doors with fanlights, and the windows are cross windows.	II
Gate piers, Rose Court; 53.81577°N 1.56474°W		c. 1840	The large gate piers have a rectangular section, and are in rusticated stone. Each pier has a bracketed cornice and a wide cap.	II
Garden studio, walls and gate piers, Headingley Terrace; 53.81645°N 1.56498°W		c. 1840	The garden studio is in stone, with a hipped slate roof, and one storey. It has corner pilasters, an entablature with a moulded cornice, a blocking course, and a raised centre. In the middle is a French window with a corniced hood on console brackets, flanked by tall windows. The wall encloses three sides of the grounds of Headingley Terrace, and has pedimented coping stones. It is about 2 metres (6 ft 7 in) high and extends for about 175 metres (574 ft). There are three pairs of square gate piers with pediments.	II
Rose Court, terrace wall and steps 53.81557°N 1.56479°W		c. 1842	A house, later used as a school, it is in stone with a double string course, an eaves band and brackets, and a hipped slate roof. There are two storeys and a basement, and five bays. On the north front, the middle bay projects and has a porte cochère on four Tuscan columns, with an entablature and a shallow pediment, and the doorway has a fanlight. The windows are casements with architraves, and aprons under the upper floor windows. At the rear is a central recessed entrance with two Tuscan columns, and the ground floor windows have a pulvinated frieze. The terrace at the rear of the house has a retaining wall and steps. The wall contains eight round-arched niches, and the steps are flanked by a rusticated balustrade.	II
Headingley Castle and wall 53.81962°N 1.57321°W		1843–46	A large house, later used for other purposes, it is in Tudor style. The house is in stone, with a string course, an embattled blocking course, and a slate roof. There is a front of five bays, the middle bay projecting and containing a porte cochère with a Tudor arch, and flanking buttresses. Above it is an oriel window, over which is a three-light window with a hood mould. The bay is flanked by octagonal buttresses that rise to panelled turrets, between them is an embattled parapet, and behind is an octagonal turret. To the right of the entrance is a bay window with an embattled blocking course, and a corner octagonal turret. The other windows are paired cross windows. To the west of the house is a stone wall enclosing the north and west sides of the terrace on a plinth, with a moulded string course and embattled coping. The wall contains a Tudor arched doorway, and has a massive terminal with a moulded capstone.	II
Headingley Methodist Church, vestry, Sunday school, hall, walls and piers 53.82144°N 1.57848°W		1844–45	The church was extended in 1862 with the addition of transepts and an apse. Together with the associated buildings, it is in gritstone with slate roofs. The entrance front is gabled with pinnacles, and it contains a central doorway with a moulded pointed arch, buttresses, lancet windows, and a central finial. To the north are a vestry, a Sunday school, and a church hall. In front is a wall with chamfered coping that contains gate piers with stepped capstones.	II
Grosvenor Terrace; 53.81807°N 1.56220°W		1845	A terrace of five stone houses with a floor band, a moulded eaves cornice, and a hipped slate roof. There are two storeys and attics, and each house has three bays. The central doorways have pilasters, a fanlight, and an entablature with a cornice, and the windows are sashes.	II
Elmfield; 53.81803°N 1.56388°W		1846	A house later used for other purposes, it is in stone with a modillion eaves cornice, and a hipped blue slate roof. There are two storeys and three bays. In the centre is a porch with pilasters, an entablature, and a modillion cornice. To the left is a single-storey canted bay window, and to the right a two-storey square bay window with segmental moulding over the ground floor windows, and a dentilled cornice and blocking course at the top. The other windows have moulded architraves.	II
Lodge house, gate piers, walls and railings 53.81753°N 1.57145°W		c. 1846	The lodge at the entrance to the grounds of Hinsley Hall is in stone with a moulded string course and a slate roof, and is in Tudor style. There are two storeys and a gabled canted front of three bays. In the centre is a porch, flanked by windows with Tudor arches, in the upper floor are two-light mullioned windows, and all have hood moulds. The gate piers are octagonal in gritstone, on moulded plinths, with pointed capstones. The wrought iron railings are on low walls, and are flanked by taller walls about 2 metres (6 ft 7 in) high and 5 metres (16 ft) long.	II
North Hill House; 53.82085°N 1.56765°W		1846	The house is in stone with a string course and panelled frieze at first floor level, an embattled parapet with a central gablet and corner crocketed pinnacles, and a slate roof, and is in Gothic Revival style. There are two storeys and a basement, and a symmetrical front of three bays. In the centre is a projecting doorway with a moulded four-centred arch, and pilasters rising to pinnacles with battlements between. In both floors on each side are five-light traceried bay windows. On the left and right are octagonal embattled chimney stacks.	II
Spring Hill; 53.81805°N 1.56429°W		1846	The house is in gritstone, and has a slate roof with coped gables and a heraldic beast at each apex. There are two storeys and attics, a south front of three bays, and a recessed bay to the right. The central porch is gabled and has a four-centred arch, and the window lights have cambered arches. To the left is a square bay window, to the right is a two-storey canted bay window, and there are inserted dormer windows.	II
Ridgeway House; 53.81941°N 1.56352°W		1848	A stone house on a plinth, with hipped slate roofs. There are two storeys, attics and a basement, and fronts of four and three bays. In the centre is a Tuscan porch with a modillioned cornice, and a doorway with a fanlight. The right bay is wider, and has moulded string courses, and a modillion eaves cornice. In the middle bay of the garden front is a canted bay window with mullions, an entablature, and console brackets.	II
Gates, gate piers and boundary walls, Ridgeway House; 53.81874°N 1.56346°W	—	c. 1848	The gritstone walls run along the west side of Grosvenor Road, flank a narrow right-of-way passing through the grounds of Ridgeway House, and form boundaries to the west side of the grounds of the houses. They contain gates in wood and wrought iron flanked by stone gate piers. The right-of-way has a round-arched opening, and is crossed by a single-slab footbridge.	II
2 and 4 Chapel Street; 53.82178°N 1.57879°W		Mid 19th century	A pair of semi-detached houses in gritstone, with a sill band, stone eaves brackets, and a slate roof. There are two storeys and four bays. Each doorway has pilasters, a fanlight, and an entablature with a cornice, and the windows are sashes.	II
5–17 Chapel Street and 6 and 8 Chapel Place; 53.82152°N 1.57923°W		Mid 19th century	A terrace of houses on a corner site in gritstone, with a sill band, stone gutter brackets, and a slate roof, hipped on the corner. There are two storeys, seven bays on Chapel Street, and three on Chapel Place. Each doorway has pilasters, a fanlight, and an entablature with a cornice, and the windows are sashes. The doorway of 17 Chapel Street is angled on the corner, and is flanked by shop windows. Between 7 and 9 Chapel Street is a round-arched passageway.	II
6–14 Chapel Street, 1–9 Chapel Terrace and 1–8 Chapel Square; 53.82170°N 1.57950°W		Mid 19th century	Two terraces of back to back houses at right angles, they are in gritstone and rendered brick, with slate roofs. There are two storeys, ten bays, on Chapel Street, and eight bays on Chapel Terrace. Between 10 and 12 Chapel Street is an elliptical arch. The doorways have fanlights, most have plain surrounds, two of the doorways on Chapel Terrace have bracketed cornices, and the windows are sashes.	II
19 and 21 Chapel Street and 9 and 11 Chapel Place; 53.82147°N 1.57971°W		Mid 19th century	Two pairs of houses in gritstone with a slate roof. There are two storeys, and the pairs of houses are at right angles on a corner site forming an L-shaped plan. The doorways have fanlights, the windows are sashes, and all have plain surrounds.	II
1, 3 and 5 Grosvenor Mount; 53.81773°N 1.56305°W		Mid 19th century	A terrace of three stone houses, with a moulded sill band, and slate roofs with coped gables. There are two storeys, and each house has two bays. The doorways have pilasters, an entablature, a cornice, and a blocking course, and the windows are sashes with rusticated voussoirs. canted bay windows have been added to Nos, 3 and 5.	II
Boundary walls, 1, 3 and 5 Grosvenor Mount; 53.81742°N 1.56319°W		Mid 19th century	The walls enclosing the gardens, and the gate piers, are in gritstone. The walls are about 1.5 metres (4 ft 11 in) high, and extend for about 80 metres (260 ft), and the gate piers have pyramidal capstones.	II
Boundary wall and gateway to east of 1 Grosvenor Terrace; 53.81797°N 1.56151°W		Mid 19th century	The wall on the east side of the grounds is in gritstone with rounded coping, it is about 50 metres (160 ft) long, and contains monolithic piers with rounded tops. Towards the south end is a recessed entrance with wrought iron gates, and cast iron posts.	II
Boundary wall to west of 5 Grosvenor Terrace; 53.81814°N 1.56306°W		Mid 19th century	The wall on the west side of the grounds is in gritstone with rounded coping, and is about 80 metres (260 ft) long. It contains a pair of square gate piers with pyramidal caps, and at the south end the wall curves and contains a pair of wrought iron gates with monolithic piers.	II
50 and 52 Headingley Lane; 53.81728°N 1.56756°W		Mid 19th century	A semi-detached stone house, later used for other purposes, it has a modillion eaves cornice, a hipped slate roof, and two storeys. The south front has four bays, the middle two bays projecting under a pediment. In the centre are three-light windows with a balustrade, the outer bays contain canted bay windows, and in the upper floor are sash windows with architraves, entablatures and cornices. The left return has a central doorway with a fanlight and a pediment with acroteria, and windows with plain surrounds.	II
17 North Hill Road; 53.81956°N 1.56674°W		Mid 19th century	A stone house with an embattled parapet and a slate roof, in Tudor style. There are two storeys and three bays, the middle bay recessed and containing a gabled porch. The outer bays are gabled, the left gable with splayed corners. The windows are casements with chamfered surrounds, in the ground floor with hood moulds. On the north front are two canted bay windows with battlements.	II
69, 71 and 73 Otley Road and walls 53.82180°N 1.57850°W		Mid 19th century	A terrace of three gritstone houses with long and short quoins and a slate roof. There are two storeys and six bays. Each house has a doorway to the left with plain jambs, a fanlight, and a cornice on brackets, and the windows are casements with projecting tie-stone jambs. The front gardens are enclosed by walls about 1.2 metres (3 ft 11 in) high with pointed coping, and the gate piers have stepped pyramidal caps.	II
Gatehouse to Devonshire Hall; 53.81827°N 1.56456°W		Mid 19th century	The gatehouse is in stone on a plinth, with a moulded eaves cornice, and hipped slate roofs. In the centre is a round carriage arch that has a pierced parapet with large and small roundels. This is flanked by single-storey two-bay cottages with doorways and sash windows in moulded architraves. The double gates are in cast iron, and have geometric patterns, paired circles, and flower motifs.	II
Old Hall, Devonshire Hall; 53.81817°N 1.56570°W		Mid 19th century	Originally Regency Villas, a pair of semi-detached houses, later used for other purposes. They are in gritstone with a hipped slate roof. There are two storeys with a basement and attics, and a south front of six bays. The doorways have moulded surrounds with a keystone, a fanlight, a cornice on console brackets, and a pierced entablature with roundels. The ground floor windows have rounded lights in moulded architraves, and in the upper floor they have square heads.	II
Semi-detached houses, Devonshire Hall; 53.81787°N 1.56494°W		Mid 19th century	Originally Regency Villas, and later used for other purposes, they are in stone with a modillion cornice, and a hipped slate roof. There are two storeys, a basement and attic, a back to back plan, and three bays. The ground floor windows are round-headed with an impost band, and the windows in the upper floor are square headed with a continuous sill band. The porches have a round arch with a keystone, pilasters, and a modillion cornice on carved console brackets, and the doorways have fanlights. There is a large three-light mullioned stair window with an architrave and cornice.	II
Boundary wall, Grosvenor House; 53.81692°N 1.56354°W		Mid 19th century	The wall is in gritstone, and extends along Grosvenor Road for about 105 metres (344 ft). This section has rounded coping, it is stepped down the hill, and contains ramped and pilastered divisions. On the northern 25 metres (82 ft) are cast iron railings. The return along Grosvenor Mount extends for about 7 metres (23 ft) and contains a gateway.	II
Bollards and railings, Headingley Parish Hall; 53.81921°N 1.57709°W		Mid 19th century	The bollards and railings enclose the garden at the front of the hall, they are about 1 metre (3 ft 3 in) high, and extend for about 50 metres (160 ft). The bollards are in gritstone and are square, chamfered and tapering, with rounded tops, and the railings are in iron.	II
Richmond House; 53.81542°N 1.57249°W		Mid 19th century	A house, later divided, it is in gritstone with a sill band, a moulded eaves cornice, a blocking course, and a hipped slate roof. There are two storeys and five bays, the middle three bays projecting under a pediment. The central porch has Tuscan columns, an entablature, and a cornice, and the windows are sashes.	II
Ridgeway Cottage; 53.81942°N 1.56386°W		Mid 19th century	A coach house and stables, later converted into a house and garage, it is in gritstone on a plinth, with a floor floor band, a deep eaves cornice, a blocking course, and a slate roof. There are two storeys and five bays, the middle bay projecting under a pedimented gable. In the centre is a cambered arch with an inserted garage door to the left. The windows are sashes, those in the upper floor with recessed apron blocks.	II
Coach house, stables, and wall with garden house, Spring Hill; 53.81810°N 1.56408°W		Mid 19th century	The buildings are in stone with coped slate roofs. The stable has a single storey and three bays, with a doorway in the middle bay and a loft door under a gable above, and the windows are sashes. The coach house has a single bay with inserted garage doors. The boundary wall has rounded coping, it is about 1.2 metres (3 ft 11 in) high and 15 metres (49 ft) long. It incorporates a garden house that has an entrance with a quoined surround and a four-centred arch, and a truncated pyramidal roof.	II
Wall, gates and gate piers, Spring Hill and Elmfield; 53.81756°N 1.56419°W		Mid 19th century	The wall forms part of the boundaries of the houses, and contains three gateways and two pairs of gates. The wall is in gritstone with rounded coping. The gate piers have pyramidal caps, and the pair at the right also have deep cornices. The gates are in wrought iron.	II
The Old Bear Pit; 53.81520°N 1.57578°W		Mid 19th century	The bear pit was built in the former Leeds Zoological and Botanical Gardens. The remaining structure was for observation of the bears, and is in rusticated stone. It consists of two circular embattled turrets with round-arched entrances, linked by a wall. In the wall are three openings, the central one with a round arch and voussoirs. To the east is the circular bear pit, lined with brick and linked to the wall by two tunnels. On the west side is a low wall, curved at the ends.	II
Moorfield House; 53.82351°N 1.57618°W		1855–56	A house, later an office, it is in gritstone with an ornate slate roof, and is in Tudor Revival style. There are two storeys and attics, and a three-storey octagonal tower on the right. The east front has six bays, the third bay projecting and canted, with a projecting single-storey porch. The porch has a four-centred arch, a carved architrave, and octagonal corner turrets with ogee domes linked by an embattled parapet. The main range also has an embattled parapet, and an octagonal spire. The tower has a machicolated embattled parapet with gargoyles, and an attached octagonal stair turret with a short spire.	II
John Taylor Teachers' Centre; 53.81764°N 1.57453°W		c. 1857	A house named Spring Bank, it was enlarged in 1877–78 and in 1885–86, and later used for other purposes. It is in gritstone with sandstone dressings on a plinth, with quoins, a string course, and a Welsh slate roof with coped shaped gables and finials. There are two storeys, basements and attics. The entrance front has four bays, and contains a buttressed embattled porch and a doorway with a quoined surround. The third bay projects and contains an oriel window under a gable, and to the right is a two-storey embattled bay. The garden front has four bays, and contains a doorway with a moulded segmental arch. Elsewhere there are embattled bay windows, and the other windows are mullioned and transomed, some with hood moulds.	II
Springbank Cottage; 53.81807°N 1.57414°W	—	c. 1857 (probable)	An entrance lodge in sandstone with gritstone dressings on a chamfered plinth, it has a Welsh slate roof with coped shaped gables, kneelers, and finials. There is one storey and an attic, and two bays. In the centre is a gabled porch with a pointed arch and a shield above, and a doorway with a chamfered surround and a Tudor arch. The windows are mullioned with hood moulds.	II
1 and 2 Broderick Court; 53.82326°N 1.57810°W		1859	A house, originally called Oakfield, and later divided, it is by Cuthbert Brodrick. The house is in gritstone, with bands, ornate moulded brackets, and a slate roof. There are two storeys and an attic, three bays under a pediment containing a round window, and a recessed gabled bay on the right. The doorway is round-arched with a semicircular fanlight, a shallow pediment with carving in the tympanum, and an acroterion. Flanking it are bay windows with cornices, and sash windows with segmental heads. The upper floor contains windows with elliptical-headed architraves.	II
Walls and gate piers, Brodrick Court; 53.82302°N 1.57823°W		1859	The wall along the front of the garden is in gritstone with moulded coping, it is 1.5 metres (4 ft 11 in) high, and about 40 metres (130 ft) long. The wall contains a pair of monolithic gate piers, each on a moulded plinth, with a dentilled cornice, and a shallow pyramidal capstone.	II
1 and 2 Alma Cottages; 53.82191°N 1.57876°W		c. 1860	A pair of cottages in gritstone, with long-and-short quoins, carved wooden eaves brackets, and a slate roof with crested ridge tiles. There are two storeys and an attic, and a front of three bays, the middle bay gabled. The windows have rusticated surrounds. On the sides are arched doorways, bay windows, and a two-light window in the gable above.	II
Outbuildings between 2 and 3 Alma Cottages; 53.82187°N 1.57908°W		c. 1860	Originally privies, later used for other purposes, they are in gritstone with a moulded string course, an embattled parapet, and a slate roof. There is a single storey, three bays, and canted corners. The doorways have shouldered arches, the windows have single lights, and all have quoined surrounds.	II
3 and 4 Alma Cottages; 53.82192°N 1.57940°W		c. 1860	A pair of cottages in gritstone, with long-and-short quoins, carved wooden eaves brackets, and a slate roof with crested ridge tiles. There are two storeys and an attic, and a front of three bays, the middle bay gabled. The windows have rusticated surrounds. On the sides are arched doorways, bay windows, and a two-light window in the gable above.	II
5 and 6 Alma Cottages; 53.82204°N 1.57962°W		c. 1860	A pair of cottages in gritstone, with long-and-short quoins, carved wooden eaves brackets, and a slate roof with crested ridge tiles. There are two storeys and an attic, and a front of three bays, the middle bay gabled. The windows have rusticated surrounds. On the sides are arched doorways, bay windows, and a two-light window in the gable above.	II
7 and 8 Alma Cottages; 53.82202°N 1.57898°W		c. 1860	A pair of cottages in gritstone, with long-and-short quoins, carved wooden eaves brackets, and a slate roof with crested ridge tiles. There are two storeys and an attic, and a front of three bays, the middle bay gabled. The windows have rusticated surrounds. On the sides are arched doorways, bay windows, and a two-light window in the gable above.	II
1–6 Prince's Grove; 53.82370°N 1.57912°W		c. 1860	A terrace of six houses in gritstone, with a sill band and a slate roof. There are two storeys and each house has two bays. The doorways are on the right, with a fanlight and a cornice on cornice brackets, and the windows are sashes.	II
Ashfield; 53.82323°N 1.57226°W		c. 1860	A large house, later divided, in gritstone with sill bands, ornate paired gutter brackets, and a slate roof. There are three storeys, a front of three bays, and a lower rear wing. The porch has paired chamfered columns, a segmental arch with a keystone, and an acanthus motif on the gable. The windows are sashes, in the lower two floors they have three lights in the outer bays and single lights in the middle bay, and the top floor windows have two lights. In the right return is a canted bay window, and at the rear is a semicircular bay window.	II
Spring House; 53.81899°N 1.57816°W		c. 1864	The house was later extended at the rear towards the road. The front is in stone, the rest of the house is in brick, and the hip roof is slated. There are two storeys and a basement, and an L-shaped plan, with a front of three bays, and a rear wing on the left. Four bull-nosed steps lead up to a central doorway that has pilasters, a fanlight, an entablature, and a cornice. The windows are four-pane sashes.	II
Former United Reformed Church; 53.81636°N 1.56545°W		1864–66	The church, later used for other purposes, was designed by Cuthbert Brodrick in Gothic Revival style. It is in gritstone with a slate roof, and consists of a nave and aisles with a basement, and a southeast steeple. It is approached by a flight of steps flanked by a wall with chamfered coping, and leads to a gabled porch with a moulded arch, attached columns, and a roundel in the apex. Above the porch is a rose window, and along the aisles are cusped lancet windows with rose windows at the heads and gables above. The steeple has a tower with three stages, moulded angles, and a spire.	II
Walls, railings, gate piers and gates, former United Reformed Church; 53.81611°N 1.56537°W	—	c. 1864	The wall on the south and east sides of the churchyard is in stone with chamfered coping and is stepped down the hill. At the west end and on the corner are gates and gate piers, the latter about 2 metres (6 ft 7 in) high, each on a chamfered plinth with a pointed capstone and lucarnes. The gate piers on the east side have chamfered shafts and squat pyramid caps, and the railings are in cast iron.	II
Former lodge, Headingley Castle; 53.81893°N 1.57448°W		1866	The lodge is in gritstone with bracketed eaves and a slate roof. There are two storeys, and fronts of two bays. On the front facing the drive is an arched doorway, with a hood mould and a carved motto above. The left bay projects, it is gabled with a half-hipped roof, and contains a canted bay window. The windows are sashes, and in the front facing the road are two windows with carved shields and a continuous moulded string course above.	II
Hinsley Hall; 53.81929°N 1.57030°W		1867	A college, later a religious centre, it is in stone with slate roofs. There are two storeys, a main range of seven bays, and a courtyard plan. In the centre is a porch with a moulded Gothic arch, above which is a three-stage clock tower, that has an arcaded clock stage, a conical stone dome on short columns, and a bud finial. The windows in the flanking bays have tympani with quatrefoils, those in the upper floor are gabled and linked by pierced parapets. Outside the main range are projecting three-bay wings, the outer bays with pyramidal roofs containing dormers and wrought iron finials.	II
Building south of Hinsley Hall; 53.81810°N 1.56408°W		1867	A house, later part of a college, it is in stone, with gutter brackets and a slate roof with coped gables and tile cresting. There are two storeys and two bays, the left bay projecting and gabled. In front of the doorway is a lean-to verandah, to the left is a canted bay window, and the other windows are sashes.	II
Building southwest of Hinsley Hall; 53.81921°N 1.57112°W	—	1867	A house, later part of a college, it is in stone, with gutter brackets and a slate roof with coped gables and tile cresting. There are two storeys and two bays, the left bay projecting and gabled. In front of the doorway is a lean-to verandah, to the left is a canted bay window, and the other windows are sashes.	II
46 Headingley Lane and 1 Ashwood Villas; 53.81647°N 1.56608°W		1870	A pair of semi-detached houses in gritstone with a slate roof, coped gables and finials. There are two storeys, basements and attics. On the front facing Ashwood Villas are three bays, the right bay gabled. In the centre, steps lead up to a porch with a hipped roof, and this is flanked by bay windows, that on the right canted. Above the left bay window is a stone plaque carved with initials and the date. On the front facing Headingley Lane are four bays, the right bay gabled and containing an oriel window on buttresses. The doorway has a moulded Gothic arch and hood mould. To the left is a canted bay window, in the roof is a gabled dormer with carved bargeboards, and the other windows are sashes.	II
2 Ash Crescent; 53.82011°N 1.58193°W		Late 19th century	A house in gritstone, with deep bracketed eaves and a stone slate roof. There are two storeys and two bays, and the house is in cottage orné style. In the centre is a gabled porch, the ground floor contains cross windows, and in the upper storey are gabled dormers.	II
Outbuildings and attached wall, 53 Headingley Lane; 53.81782°N 1.57467°W		Late 19th century	Originally service rooms, a coach house and stables to Spring Bank, and later used for other purposes, the buildings are in stone with Welsh slate roofs. The coach house has a single storey and two bays, and contains a gabled entrance arch with moulded voussoirs, and an elaborate wrought iron scrolled overthrow. The service range steps down the hill in three stages, and has a doorway with a chamfered surround and gabled dormers. The buildings are linked by a wall about 2 metres (6 ft 7 in) high.	II
Coach house, Devonshire Hall; 53.81896°N 1.56568°W		Late 19th century	The coach house, stables and cottage were converted for residential use in about 1994. The building is in gritstone, and has a slate roof with coped gables. There are two storeys and four unequal bays, and it is in Tudor style. In the third bay is a round-headed carriage arch with a keystone, and above is a hay loft door converted into a window. Most of the other windows are mullioned, and there is a continuous hood mould over the ground floor openings. On the roof is a louvred cupola with an ogee lead roof and a tall wrought iron finial.	II
Ford House, Leeds Girls' High School; 53.81629°N 1.56919°W		Late 19th century	A pair of semi-detached houses, later used as a school, it is in gritstone, with a moulded floor band, and a blue slate roof, and is in Gothic Revival style. The houses are mirror-images, with two storeys, a basement and attics, and eight bays. The entrance bays project and contain round-arched doorways with attached columns and fanlights. These bays rise to square turrets with pyramidal roofs and wrought iron finials. The windows are sashes, some converted to casements, and there are square bay windows that have balustrades pierced with quatrefoils. The attics are gabled with finials, and in the returns are three-light stair windows.	II
Headingley Taps Public House; 53.82055°N 1.57963°W		1879–80	A pumping station converted into a public house in 1992–93, it is in stone with a slate roof. There is an E-shaped plan, with a range along Bennett Road, and three gabled rear wings with Dutch gables and finials, the middle wing smaller and recessed. The range has seven bays, shaped dormers, and end Dutch gables. In each outer wing is a central doorway with a hood mould and a coat of arms above. It is flanked by lancet windows, and over it is a mullioned and transomed window with three stepped lights.	II
Lodge, gate piers and wall, former North Lane Pumping Station; 53.82067°N 1.58010°W	—	1879–80	The lodge is in stone on a plinth, with quoins, and a slate roof with stepped gable copings. There is a single storey, a square plan, and a blocked doorway and window. The boundary wall is stepped up with stepped gabled copings, and the gate piers are square and chamfered, and have wide pyramidal capstones.	II
Former Parochial Institute; 53.82033°N 1.57895°W		1883–84	Originally a meeting room for St Michael's Church, and later used as offices, it was designed by George Corson in Gothic Revival style. The building is in sandstone, with freestone dressings and a Welsh slate roof. There is a T-shaped plan, with two gables facing the road, and a rear wing. The left bay projects, and contains an open porch that has columns with foliage capitals, above it are two sculpted panels, to the left are two lancet windows, and in the gable is a quatrefoil. The larger right bay has a central doorway with sidelights and a three-light mullioned window above, and is flanked by buttresses. Above is a large traceried Gothic window, and the other windows are mullioned and transomed.	II
St Michael's Church; 53.81920°N 1.57603°W		1884–86	The church was designed by J. Loughborough Pearson in Gothic Revival style, and is built in gritstone with tile roofs. It has a cruciform plan, consisting of a nave and a chancel, both with a clerestory, north and south aisles, north and south transepts, a west porch, and a thin west steeple embraced by the aisles. The porch has buttresses with gablets and rising to turrets, a doorway with triple attached columns, a pointed arch with moulded dog-tooth decoration, above which are statues in niches, including St Michael in the centre. The steeple has a tower with three stages, octagonal pinnacles, and a broach spire. The windows are lancets, single in the chancel, paired in the nave, and two tiers of triple lancets at the east end.	II*
Wall and gate piers, St Michael's Church; 53.81913°N 1.57536°W	—	1885 (probable)	The wall enclosing the churchyard is in gritstone with coping, and is about 180 metres (590 ft) long. The gate piers are square, and about 2 metres (6 ft 7 in) high. Each pier has pilasters, and pyramidal capstones with cusped gablets.	II
Wheatfield House; 53.82286°N 1.57315°W		1880s	The house was extended to the rear in 1892, and has since been used for other purposes. It is in Italianate style, built in gritstone, with bracketed eaves and a slate roof. The house is in two and three storeys, and has a front of four bays. In the centre is a porch with Tuscan columns, an entablature, and a dentilled cornice, and above it is a square tower with a pyramidal roof. In the left bay is a canted bay window. The rear wing has a central three-light bow window, round turrets at the corners, a moulded string course, and egg and dart moulding.	II
Former coach house and stables, Wheatfield House; 53.82297°N 1.57344°W		1892	The coach house and stables, later used for other purposes, are in gritstone, with rusticated quoins, modillion eaves, and a slate roof. There are two storeys and a basement, and a symmetrical south front of four bays. It contains a blocked carriage arch with a Gibbs surround, a keystone carved with a horse's heads, Tuscan columns, a broken scrolled pediment, and a pulvinated frieze. There are two windows with semicircular fanlights above, and at the rear are six similar windows. On the roof is a wooden cupola with ionic columns and a dome with a weathervane.	II
4 and 6 Shire Oak Road; 53.82004°N 1.57384°W		1893	A pair of semi-detached houses in red brick, with dentilled eaves carried round the outer bays as cornices with wooden balustrades. They have a grey slate roof, and are in Queen Anne Revival style. There are two storeys and attics, and seven bays, the outer bays containing full-height canted bay windows. In the centre is a doorway with a fanlight in the form of a three-light oriel window. The windows are sashes, and there are two dormers with segmental pediments. In the left return is a doorway with a flat hood, and the right return contains a bow window.	II
22D Shire Oak Road; 53.81992°N 1.57122°W		1893	Stables and a coach house, later converted for residential use, it is in red brick, with a timber framed upper storey, and a roof of sandstone slabs, and is in Vernacular Revival style. There are two storeys and two bays, the left bay projecting and gabled. In the ground floor is a porch, a stable door, a two-light window, and inserted garage doors. The upper floor contains casement windows and a five-light mullioned window.	II
Arncliffe; 53.82011°N 1.57144°W		1893	A house, later divided, it is in red brick with moulded string courses, and a roof of sandstone slabs with coped gables and ball finials. There are two storeys, attics and cellars, the front is canted with four bays, the second and fourth bays projecting, and at the rear is a single-storey service wing over a basement. The doorway in the second bay has a segmental arch with the date and initials, and above is moulding in brick. In the fourth bay is a plain parapet, and the second bay has a parapet with a stone strapwork panel and ball finials. At the rear is a stair window, a canted bay window, and two dormers, and in the left return is an oriel window with a balustrade.	II
Garden wall and summer house, Arncliffe; 53.82004°N 1.57172°W		1893	A curved terrace wall with ramped coping, containing stone seating, and garden steps, lead from the house to a summer house. This is in red brick with stone dressings, brick quoins, and a felted ogee roof. It contains a doorway with a Gibbs surround in moulded brick, and a pediment. There are Venetian windows in two walls containing stained glass.	II
Lincombe; 53.81844°N 1.56715°W		1898	A house in rendered brick with gritstone dressings, deep eaves and a hipped grey slate roof. There are two storeys and attics, and three bays, the right bay projecting. On the front and left return are bay windows, and in the roof are dormers. All the windows have mullions, and some also have transoms.	II
Red Hill; 53.82114°N 1.57059°W		1900–01	A house designed by Francis Bedford and Sidney Kitson in Vernacular Revival style, the ground floor is in gritstone, the upper floor is jettied and tile-hung, and the gabled cross-wing is timber framed. There are two storeys and attics, and three bays. In the centre is a timber porch with carved spandrels, and in the upper floor of the cross-wing is an oriel window. The other windows are mullioned casements.	II
Former St Margaret's Church; 53.80999°N 1.57424°W		1907–09	The church, later used as an arts centre, was designed by Temple Moore, and completed in 1963–64 by George Pace. It is in red brick with bands of coloured brick, stone dressings, and a slate roof. The church consists of a nave and chancel under one roof, a clerestory, north and south aisles, each with four cross-gables, and entrances at the west end. The windows are lancets.	II*
Baptist Church and church hall 53.81937°N 1.58214°W		1909	The Sunday school, later the church hall, was built first, and the church followed in 1927–28. They are in red brick, with stone dressings, and roofs of Westmorland green slate. The Sunday school on the right has two storeys and a basement, a three-storey tower entrance recessed on the left, and a front of three bays. The middle bay is gabled and contains a mullioned window in the ground floor, and a five-light window with Perpendicular tracery above. This is flanked by porches, doors with fanlights, and moulded arches with carved panels, and in front are wrought iron railings. The gabled end of the church faces the road, and contains a three-light traceried window, lancet windows, and foundation stones.	II
Elinor Lupton Centre and walls 53.81699°N 1.57091°W		1912	A church that was extended in 1932, and later used as part of a school, it is in Portland stone, and has a cornice with a blocking course. There are two storeys, the original block has five bays, and the extension on the right is recessed with two bays on the front and nine on the return. The middle three bays of the original block project slightly and have four giant pilasters with Egyptian-style capitals and a low pediment. The central doorway and the windows have moulded architraves, the doorway has a shaped cornice surmounted by an urn, and the windows have metal frames. The extension contains a central blind window with a circle motif above and a pediment on four brackets on the front, and in the return are two similar doorways and pediments. Enclosing the grounds are walls of gritstone, with coping and piers in Portland stone. On the piers is a Greek key pattern, and they have banded capstones with a disc motif on the front. The building reopened as a pub named The Golden Beam in June 2021.	II
Hyde Park Cinema; 53.81210°N 1.56938°W		1914	The cinema is in red brick with dressings in faience, a three-storey canted entrance bay, and an auditorium with five bays. The ground floor is open with Ionic columns and pilasters, a moulded cornice, an entablature, a frieze with lettering, and a modillion cornice above. The middle bay contains paired windows with segmental arches and keystones above, in the top storey is a three-light window over which is an elaborate Dutch gable with ball finials. The outer bays contain sash windows with a balustraded parapet above. In the right return is a dentilled cornice, pilasters, recessed segmental-arched panels with keystones, two blind oval panels, and a doorway with a flat hood. In the left return is a three-light arched stair window, a doorway with a hood, and a pediment containing a round window, and on the roof is a square domed ventilator.	II
Gas lamp post outside Hyde Park Cinema; 53.81223°N 1.56921°W		Early 20th century	The lamp post is in cast iron, and about 7 metres (23 ft) high. The base and column have relief decoration, the arms are scrolled, and it is surmounted by a vase finial.	II
War memorial 53.81953°N 1.57627°W		1922	The war memorial, at a road junction, is in Portland stone, and has a stepped base, and a square two-stage plinth on which is an obelisk. On the south side of the obelisk is a sword. On the plinth are bronze plaques with inscriptions, the names of those lost in the First World War, and a wreath. The memorial is surrounded by railings.	II
Devonshire Hall; 53.81839°N 1.56525°W		1928	A university hall of residence developed from earlier houses, it is in stone, the upper parts are rendered, and the roof is slated. The building consists of a main range of five bays, and two side ranges of nine bays, forming three sides of a courtyard. The middle three bays of the main block have three storeys, the central bay rising higher and containing a two-storey oriel window, above which is an embattled clock tower. The flanking bays have balustraded parapets and the outer bays have two storeys, and these are linked by one-storey ranges to the side ranges. The latter have three storeys and attics, with some bays projecting and containing gabled dormers.	II
Three telephone kiosks 53.81943°N 1.57557°W		1935	The three telephone kiosks are outside the telephone exchange, and are of the K6 type, designed by Giles Gilbert Scott. Constructed in cast iron with a square plan and a dome, they have unperforated crowns in the top panels.	II
