= Public entertainment licence =

In the United Kingdom, a public entertainment licence is a form of licence required for some types of public entertainment under certain circumstances. Public entertainment licenses are granted by local authorities. The types of entertainment activities regulated include screening films, music and dance performances, and combat sports performances.

Public entertainment licences are distinct from sex establishment licences, which license a number of sex-related public activities.
