= Victoria Ground (Leeds) =

Former park and cricket ground in Leeds

- Location: Leeds, Yorkshire
- Coordinates: 53.81099°N 1.56619°W
- Establishment: 1846 (first recorded match)
- As of 22 August 2010; Source: Ground profile

The Victoria Ground (also known as the Royal Park) was a cricket ground in Leeds, Yorkshire. The first recorded match on the ground was in 1846, when a Yorkshire team played the All-England Eleven. The ground was due to host a first-class match in 1858 between the United North of England Eleven and the United South of England Eleven, but it was cancelled.

The final recorded match on the ground saw Leeds play the United North of England Eleven in 1878. The original size of the ground had decreased in 1858 when a portion of it was sold to a new owner and by 1890 the entire ground had been sold to be built upon.
