= Nicolaus Copernicus 2nd Secondary School in Cieszyn =

Coordinates: 49.7459°N 18.6347°E

Second High School of Mikołaj Kopernik in Cieszyn
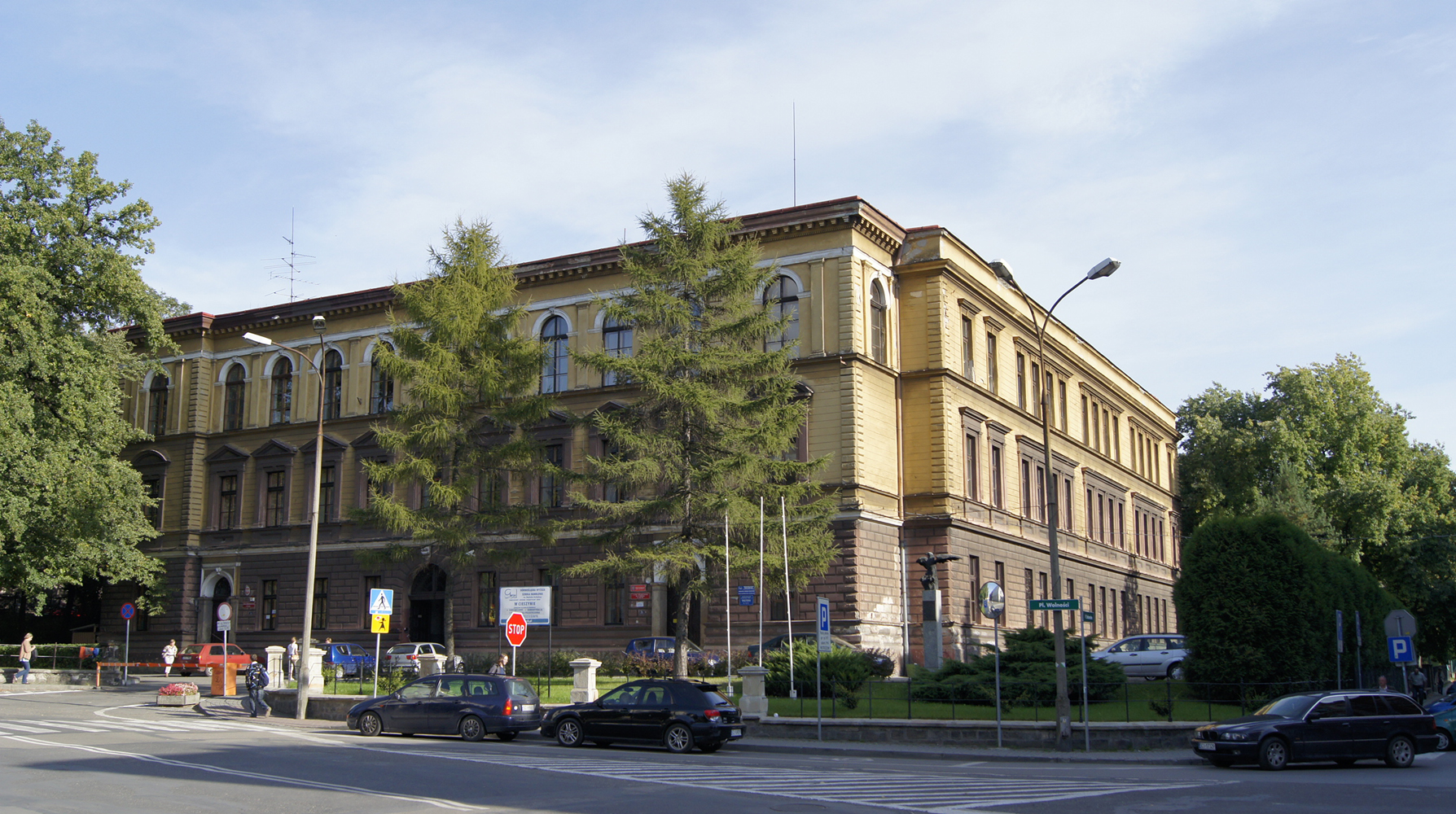
- Cieszyn, Poland

Information
- Established: 13 September 1879
- Website: kopernik.netus.pl/index.php?pokaz=_main

The Second High School of Mikołaj Kopernik in Cieszyn is a school located at Wolności square 7B in Cieszyn, Poland, in the building of the former Municipal People's School.

== History ==
=== History (of the building) of the school until 1929 ===
Due to the growing number of inhabitants, on 28 June 1874 the town authorities made a decision on the construction of a new school. In December 1875 the City Council announced a competition for an architectural 21:24, 27 March 2020 (UTC)design of a municipal people's school for boys and girls (Städtische Volksschule). The competition was a great success and 56 projects were submitted. In March 1876 the results were announced, the winner was a design from the designing office of Ferdinand Fellner and Hödl from Vienna. Construction of the building was taken up by a municipal constructor, Aloysius Jedeck, who initiated construction works in April 1877 and finished them in September 1879. The school was located on a plot of land at the corner of the Successor Rudolph Square and the Empress Elisabeth street (now the Square of Freedom and Pawła Stalmacha street).

The ceremonial opening of the school was held on 13 September 1879 and was zealously celebrated by the Minister of Denominations and Education of the Austro-Hungarian Monarchy - Karl von Stremayr. To commemorate the event a memorial marble plaque was unveiled with the following inscription in German: “Construction of this People's School was initiated on 12 April 1877, during the reign of His Majesty the Emperor Francis Joseph I, by the Municipality of Cieszyn, according to the design awarded in a competition and submitted by Viennese designers Fellner and Hödl and completed on 30 November 1879. Classes in this building of the people's school were initiated on 15 September 1879. May the Divine Providence have this school in its care. This construction has been managed by a municipal constructor Aloysius Jedeck under the supervision of municipal engineers Karl Khünl from 1 May 1877 to 15 January 1879 and the designer Carl Stadler von Wolffersgrün from 16 January 1879 to 31 July 1879”.

On 18 October 1880, the school hosted the emperor Francis Joseph I, who planted an oak in front of the building to commemorate the event. Subsequent visits of members of the Habsburg dynasty took place on 25 October 1882, when the school was visited by the duke of Cieszyn Albrecht and 27 September 1885, when a visit was paid by the archduke Frederick.

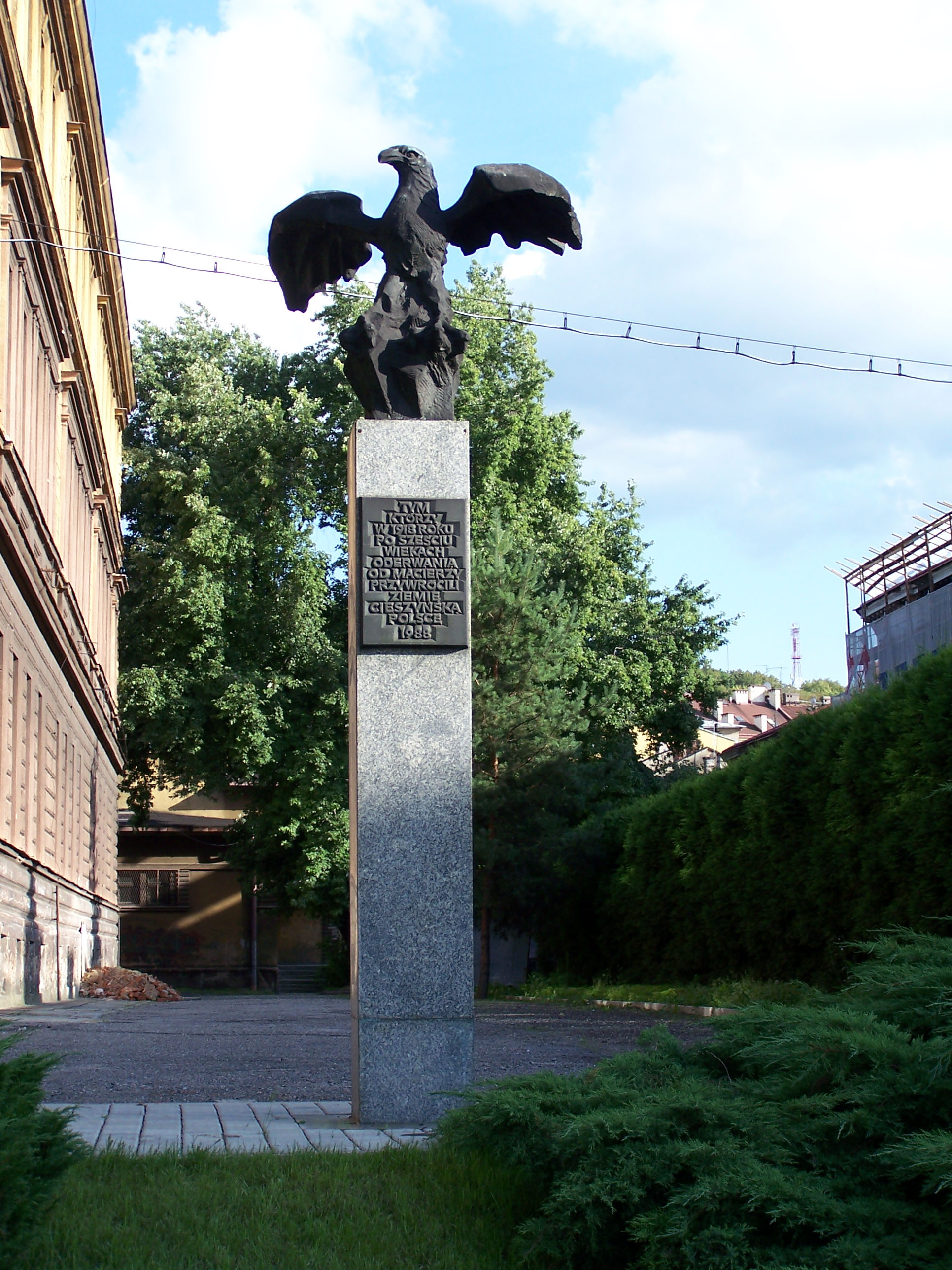
Monument of Freedom

The school shall forever be remembered in the annals of Cieszyn Silesia thanks to events that took place on the square in front of the building. At night on 31 October 1918 a group of Polish officers commanded by lieutenant Klemens Matusiak arrested the Austrian commander of the Cieszyn garrison, colonel J. Gerndt. At that time the school was the garrison headquarters and it was there where Gerndt renounced his functions and handed the command over to Poles. To commemorate this event, Rudolph Square was called the Square of Freedom and on 31 October 1988 a Monument of Freedom was unveiled in front of the school.

=== History of the school since 1929 ===
In the school year 1923–24, the grammar school of Antoni Osuchowski introduced a mathematical-biological profile. In 1929 this profile, pursuant to a regulation of the Minister of Religious Denominations and Public Enlightenment, was transformed into a separate Mathematical-Biological Grammar School. In 1938 the Mathematical-Biological Grammar School was transformed into a State Grammar School and High School for Boys of Mikołaj Kopernik. The school was removed from the edifice at the corner of Kochanowskiego street and Londzin Square to a new building at the Square of Freedom in the school year 1948/1949.

A reform of the educational system carried out in 1948 modified the structure of education. Coeducational character of education was banned. The high school of Antoni Osuchowski became a school for boys, and the High School of Kopernika school for girls. This situation lasted until the school year 1957–58. The next year the school regained its pre-war patron. In the '60s a primary school was opened in the building and the school itself was replaced by a High School for the Working. 1983 saw the creation of Collective High Schools of Mikołaj Kopernik. In the '70s new profiles were created, namely humanistic, biological-chemical and general. In the 90s more and more young people were interested in computer science, so the educational offer was broadened with an emphasis on informatics and mathematics.

== Architecture ==
The building was erected on a rectangular plan measuring 50 by 42 m (164 by 138 ft) with an inner courtyard. Both the exterior and interior of the school, its representative rooms, entrance halls and the auditorium received a neo-Renaissance decor. Even the layout of storeys and regular distribution of windows give the entire building a harmonious look. The windows are separated by pilasters and beams. There is an entrance gate located on the axis of the building. Moreover, the body of the school was emphasised by a symmetric distribution of side projections.

== Class profiles ==
The school offers the following profiles:

- Psychological-humanistic profile (extended curricula of Polish, history and biology)
- Linguistic-touristic profile (extended curricula of English, geography, German or French)
- Social-legal profile (extended curricula of Polish, history, social science)
- Polytechnic profile (extended curricula of mathematics, physics and computer science)
- Biological-chemical profile (extended curricula of biology, chemistry and mathematics)
- Economy-management profile (extended curricula of mathematics, geography and English)

== Administration ==
Director: Regina Rakowska

Deputy director: Maria Mendrek

Deputy director: Karolina Grabowska

== International ==
=== Twinning arrangements ===
The high-school established exchange partnerships with the 'Institution Saint Michel: Collège and Lycée', a Catholic Secondary School with boarding facilities located in Solesmes, France.

== Famous professors ==
- 1929–1939: Julian Przyboś
- 1973–1993: Stefania Bojda
- 1979–1990: Idzi Panic

== Notable graduates ==
Graduation year quoted in brackets:

=== Kornel Filipowicz (1932) – prose writer, poet, scenarist ===
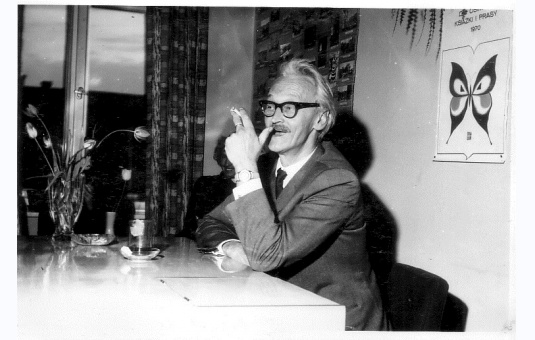
Source:

- Jan Szczepanski (1932) - sociologist, chancellor of the University of Lodz, factual member and vice president of the Polish Academy of Sciences, member of the Sejm of the People's Republic of Poland
- Alfred Łaszowski (1933) - writer and journalist
- Paweł Niemiec (1933) – officer, during World War II fighter pilot, commander of divisions of the Polish Air Force in Great Britain.
- Paul Sikora (1933) - Professor of anthropology at the Jagiellonian University.
- Wiktor Wawrzyczek (1934) - chemist, professor at the Higher School of Agriculture in Olsztyn
- Anna Więzik(maiden name The shafts) (1951) - poet
- Jerzy Kronhold (1963) - poet, cultural activist, Consul General of the Republic of Poland in Ostrava
- Zbigniew Machej (1977) - poet, translator and cultural activist, in 1987-1991 Professor at his former high school[5][6]
- Mariusz Grzegorzek (1980) - theater and film director
- Marek Czyż (1987) - journalist
- Maciej Olbrycht (1998) – film director, videoclip director
- Mateusz Ligocki (2001) – snowboarder
- Paulina Ligocka (2003) – snowboarder
- Michał Ligocki (2004)[ – snowboarder
