= Marie-Alphonse Sonnois =

His Eminence Marie-Alphonse Sonnois
- Archbishop of Cambrai
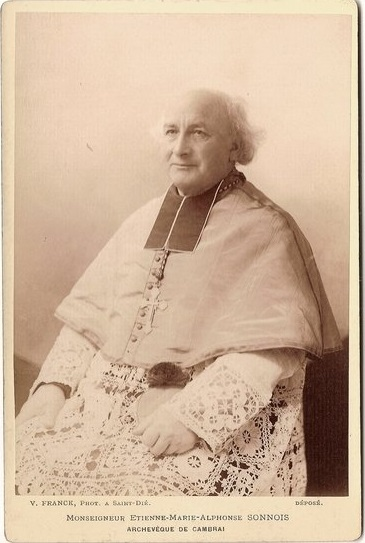
- Church: Roman Catholic Church
- Archdiocese: Cambrai

Personal details
- Born: Etienne-Marie-Alphonse Sonnois; 10 December 1828 Lamargelle, Côte-d'Or in eastern France.
- Died: 7 February 1913 (aged 84) Cambrai in the Nord, in the Hauts-de-France region of France on the Scheldt.
- Coat of arms

Etienne-Marie-Alphonse Sonnois (10 December 1828, Lamargelle [Saint-Seine-l'Abbaye] in the Côte-d'Or in eastern France – 7 February 1913, Cambrai within the Hauts-de-France region on the Scheldt river, was a French Catholic bishop, bishop of Saint-Dié from 1889 to 1893 then archbishop of Cambrai de 1893 to 1913.

== Early life ==
Born to a doctor father named François who joined Saint-Seine-l'Abbaye when Sonnois was still very young, he belongs to a family which gave several of his children to the Church. His brother Joseph-Emile-Alphonse, born on December 20, 1830, graduated from École spéciale militaire de Saint-Cyr and after taking part in numerous battles including the Crimean War, he became head general of the 16th Division of the Infantry and was later named Commandeur of the Légion D'Honneur on December 28, 1889. Another brother, Gustave-Eugène, was commander of the 6th brigade of infantry (Beauvais and Amiens) and was made Officier of the Légion D'Honneur on July 5, 1888.

== Priesthood ==
He was ordained a priest on October 3, 1852, for the diocese of Dijon. He first taught philosophy at the Grand Seminary of Dijon, then he was appointed pastor in various parishes of the diocese: Jouey, Santenay, then Auxonne.

== Bishop of Saint-Dié ==
Appointed Bishop of Saint-Dié on December 21, 1889, Mgr Sonnois received the canonical investiture of Pope Leo XIII on December 30 of the same year. He was consecrated bishop on March 19, 1890, by the future cardinal Victor-Lucien-Sulpice Lécot, then bishop of Dijon. He entered Saint-Dié on April 16, 1890. Sonnois was described as a discreet and benevolent man who strived to visit his entire diocese. However, he had to face difficulties with the government following the opposition of his vicars general to Minister Jules Ferry, elected from Saint-Dié. He relaunched the work of the Jeanne-d'Arc church at the Basilica of Bois-Chenu in Domrémy and encouraged pilgrimages there by entrusting the church to the Eudists (Congregation of Jesus and Mary) who collected the necessary funds throughout France for the continued construction of the future basilica.

== Archbishop of Cambrai ==
By decree of November 26, 1892, Mgr Sonnois was appointed Archbishop of Cambrai, he received the canonical investiture of the Holy See on January 19, 1893. He had to face in his new diocese the opposition between a powerful patronage and priests attentive to workers' misery and marked by social Catholicism, the most famous of which was Father Jules Auguste Lemire, deputy for Hazebrouck. Sonnois' pastoral activity led him to crown Notre-Dame de Grâce in Cambrai and Notre-Dame du Saint-Cordon in Valenciennes. He also built the Joan of Arc school in Lille, led the foundation of the École Saint-Joseph in Solesmes and founded the Notre-Dame de Grâce college in Cambrai. Deeply marked by the application of the 1905 French law on the Separation of the Churches and the State, he gradually lost his faculties and left the administration of his diocese to Bishop François Delamaire, coadjutor since 1906. He died on February 7, 1913.

== See also ==
- Catholic Church in France
- List of Catholic dioceses in France
- List of bishops and archbishops of Cambrai
- List of bishops of Saint-Dié
- Roman Catholic Archdiocese of Cambrai
- Roman Catholic Diocese of Saint-Dié
