= Grammar School at Leeds =

The Grammar School at Leeds

Location
- Alwoodley Gates; Harrogate Road; Leeds, West Yorkshire, LS17 8GS; England; 53.86503°N 1.51851°W

Information
- Type: Private day school
- Motto: Be Inspired
- Religious affiliation: Multi-faith
- Established: 2005
- Department for Education URN: 108113 Tables
- Chair: David P A Gravells
- Principal and Chief Executive: Sue Woodroofe
- Gender: Co-educational
- Age: 3 to 18
- Enrolment: 2,370
- Houses: 8
- Colour: Indigo
- Publication: GSAL Life
- Website: Official website

The Grammar School at Leeds (GSAL) is a private day school in Leeds, England, created on 4 August 2005 by the merger of Leeds Grammar School (founded c. 1552) and Leeds Girls' High School (co-founded in 1876 by Frances Lupton).

The schools merged in September 2008, at which point the school was opened to both sexes. The school was situated on two sites: the senior school (ages 11–18) and junior school (7–11) at Alwoodley, while the former Leeds Girls' High School site in Headingley is used by the infant school and nursery, however, both schools are at the Alwoodley site now. The school operates as a diamond school, classes for girls and boys between the ages of 11 and 16 are segregated, but extracurricular activities are mixed. Junior school and sixth form classes are coeducational. The school is a member of The Headmasters' and Headmistresses' Conference (HMC).

In 2020, GSAL was named the Independent School of the Decade for the North by The Times.

== House structure ==
A key element of the school is the eight school houses, each with two house captains and four deputies. They are:

- Eddison House – named after Anne Eddison, of the Yorkshire Ladies Council of Education who helped set up Leeds Girls' High School.
- Ermystead House – named after William Ermystead, a priest who donated properties to Leeds Grammar School in 1552.
- Ford House – named after John Ford, a founding member of the LGHS Council.
- Harrison House – named after John Harrison, benefactor, who built Leeds Grammar School's third site on North Street in 1642.
- Lawson House – named after Godfrey Lawson, Mayor of Leeds, who endowed the Lawson Library, the oldest library in the city.
- Lupton House – named after Frances Lupton, who helped found LGHS, and her granddaughter Elinor G. Lupton, who funded the eponymous centre at the Headingley site.
- Powell House – named after Helena Langthorne Powell, the second Headmistress of LGHS, who established its move to Headingley, where it remained until 2008.
- Sheafield House – named after William Sheafield, who is traditionally thought of as the founder of Leeds Grammar School in 1552.

== Locations ==
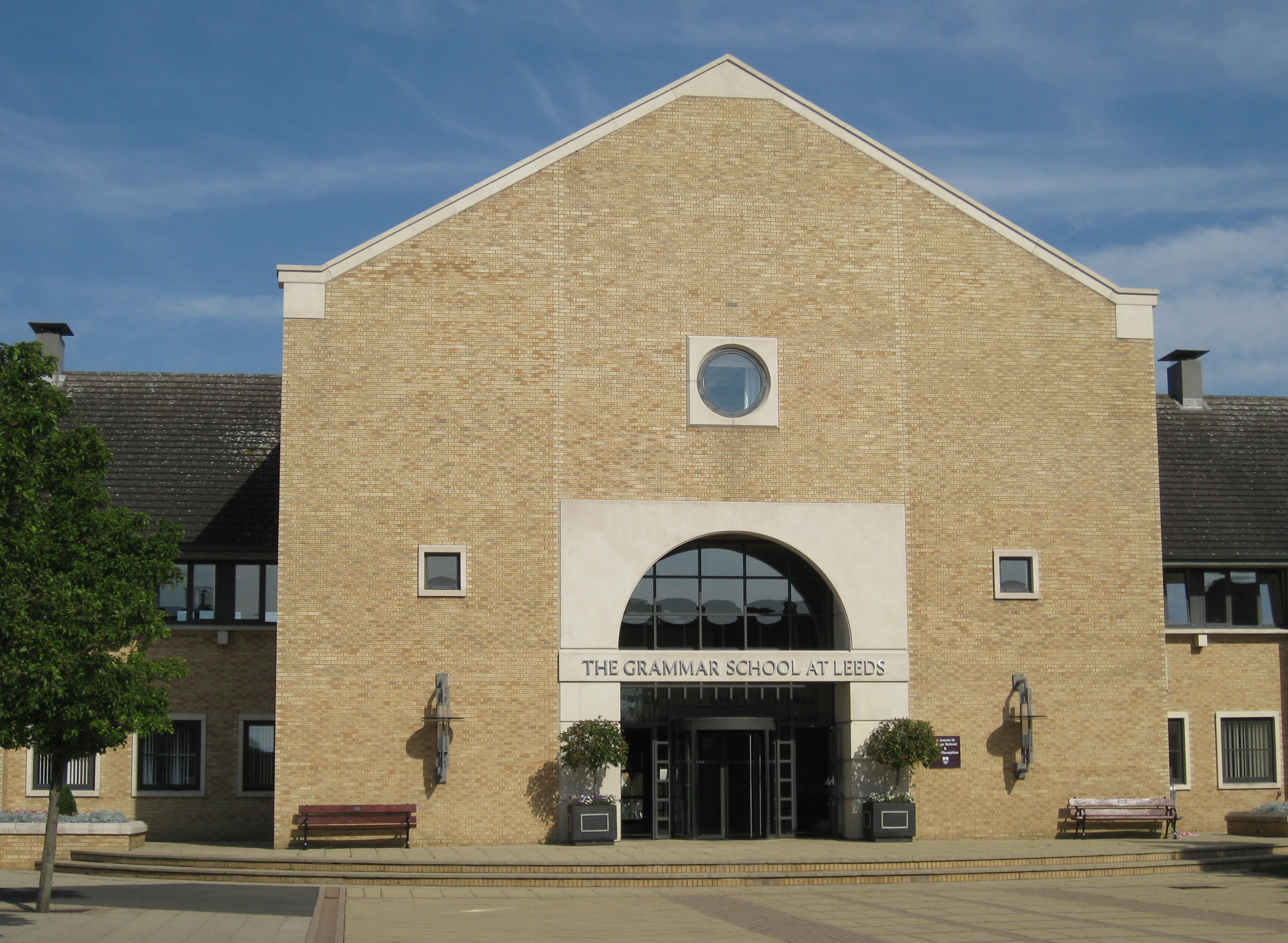
Main entrance of the Senior School

The Grammar School at Leeds was established by the merger of Leeds Grammar School and Leeds Girls' High School in 2005. The schools operated on two separate sites some distance between each other. Leeds Girls' High School operated from three separate sites in Headingley, whilst Leeds Grammar School had a 138-acre (0.56 km^{2}) modern campus in Alwoodley.

When the schools merged in 2008, four sections were created. The junior and senior schools and sixth form operate from the expanded Alwoodley Gates site (originally Leeds Grammar School). The Alwoodley site was redeveloped from 2007 to 2008, and contains the sixth form and maths departments and the Lawson Library, science department and refectory were extended. Rose Court Nursery & Pre-Prep School operated in Headingley from the refurbished Ford House belonging to Leeds Girls' High School and a nursery extension. The rest of the Leeds Girls' High School site is surplus to requirements awaiting an application for outline planning permission for residential housing. The site currently stands empty.

In September 2020, younger pupils from Rose Court moved from the Headingley site into Alwoodley Gates, completing the merger to the new site.

== History ==
The Grammar School at Leeds was created on 31 August 2005 when Leeds Grammar School merged with Leeds Girls' High School. The schools physically merged in September 2008.

Plans for the merger were not universally welcomed. In 2003, a campaign group, "No Merger in 2007" stated there was a "hidden agenda", to reduce debts incurred by the LGS building programme, and the proposed merger "makes no educational sense". LGS headmaster, Mark Bailey, said that only a fifth of parents opposed the planned merger, and the LGHS headmistress Sue Fishburn stated that 80% of parents were in favour. A number of parents stated a preference for strictly single-sex establishments despite assurances that classrooms would be single-sex.

In January 2004, Mark Bailey reported that less than 1% of the 1500 families with children at both schools "wrote to oppose the move". Further controversy was reported in 2005, when plans for the school crest were released. According to the report, "Parents who contacted the Yorkshire Post said many felt dismayed by the merger and the new logo but dared not speak up". One parent felt the existing crest had been "obliterated by a felt-tip doodle".

Plans to redevelop the Alwoodley site met with opposition. Leeds City Council delayed its decision for the planning application until summer 2006, requiring the physical merger to be put back until September 2008. Controversy regarding the expected increase in traffic levels at Alwoodley arose, and a new traffic plan was submitted.

Work began in August 2007 to form a new site access junction. The construction of a pedestrian tunnel and a 30 mph (48 km/h) speed limit was enforced to relieve traffic pressure. Controversy persisted into late 2007 over the possible need for an additional vehicle entrance in Alwoodley and arrangements for the disposal of the Headingley LGHS site.

== International ==
=== Twinning arrangements ===
The school established exchange partnerships with the 'Institution Saint Michel: Collège and Lycée', a Catholic Secondary School with boarding facilities located in Solesmes, France.
