= École Saint-Joseph =

- S. Ioseph
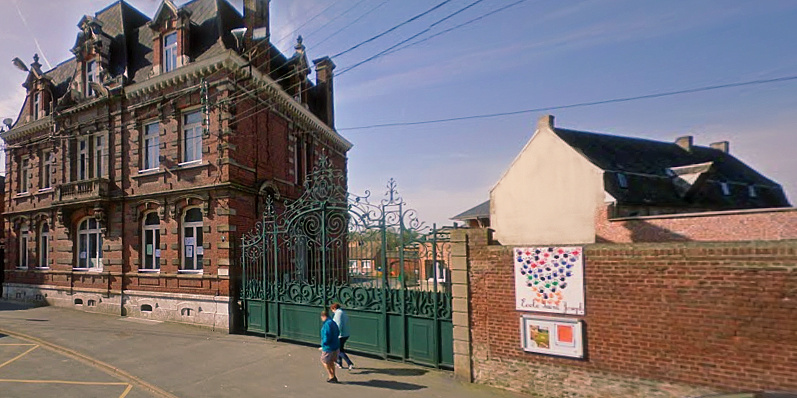
- Two of the main buildings’ façades in 2009.

Location
- 9 place Jean Jaurès; Solesmes, Nord, Hauts-de-France, 59730; France; 50°11′10″N 3°29′57″E

Information
- Type: Catholic school administered by the Ministry of National Education (France)
- Religious affiliation: Catholic Church
- Patron saints: Saint Joseph (Hebrew: יוֹסֵף; Greek: Ἰωσήφ)
- Established: 1892; 134 years ago
- Founder: Roman Catholic Archdiocese of Cambrai (French: Archidiocèse de Cambrai) of the Latin Rite
- Local authority: Academy of Lille - Cambrai - Le Cateau-Cambrésis district
- School code: 0596420H
- Head teacher: Valérie Caron
- Staff: (±) 40
- Gender: Mixed-sex education
- Enrolment: ± 320 (2018)
- Language: French, German, English
- Website: school.beneylu.com/site-ecole-saint-joseph-solesmes-nord

École Saint-Joseph (French pronunciation: [ekɔl sɛ̃ ʒozɛf]) is a French Catholic school ruled by the Ministry of National Education and based in Solesmes, Nord department, within the Hauts-de-France bordering Belgium. It was founded in 1892 by the Roman Catholic Archdiocese of Cambrai (French: Archidiocèse de Cambrai) of the Latin Church and is attached to the Cambrai - Le Cateau-Cambrésis educational district contractually regulated by Lille. It is part of the Saint-Pierre consortium comprising schools in three other cities (Le Cateau, Caudry and Le Quesnoy). The manor is a regional landmark due to its typical architecture. As of September 2018, it has more than three hundred pupils supervised by a staff of around forty agents.

== History ==
The École Saint-Joseph is the merger of two Catholic schools fusioned to create mixed-sex education:

- The Saint-Joseph school for girls was already run before 1900 by the Canonesses of Saint-Augustin of the Notre-Dame Congregation, a female teaching religious congregation of pontifical right founded by Peter Fourier (1565–1640) but their building located 'du Pontceau' street was subsequently taken over to become the 'Hospice de Solesmes'. The nuns then abandoned teaching and a new 'Saint-Joseph school' was officially inaugurated on 3 October 1904 at '18-50 Rue de l'Abbaye ' with civilian teachers in a large building ceded by Archbishop Marie-Alphonse Sonnois (1893–1913) transferred from the Roman Catholic Diocese of Saint-Dié. The school will remain there until the start of the 1961 academic year, when it relocated to a manor house with typical architecture of the canton located on Place Jean Jaurès, made available to it by the "Maison des Œuvres" and managed by the Sisters of the Precious Blood (Monza) recognized by diocesan right on 17 May 1876 by the senator of the Kingdom of Sardinia and Archbishop of Milan Luigi Nazari di Calabiana and pontifical on 10 July 1934. They are not to be confused with Sisters Adorers of the Precious Blood. The sisters will manage the school from 1961 to 1980.
- The Sainte-Marie boys school was established in 1892 in a building built for the teaching brothers of the Christian schools that run it. After the First World War, these brothers not having returned to Solesmes, the school building was ceded to the Archdiocese which enlarged it and made it its "minor seminary" which currently constitutes the central building of the Institution Saint-Michel. In return, the Archdiocese handed over to the school a building at '18 rue de l'Abbaye' where it relocated in 1924 with a civilian teaching body.

=== Philanthropy ===
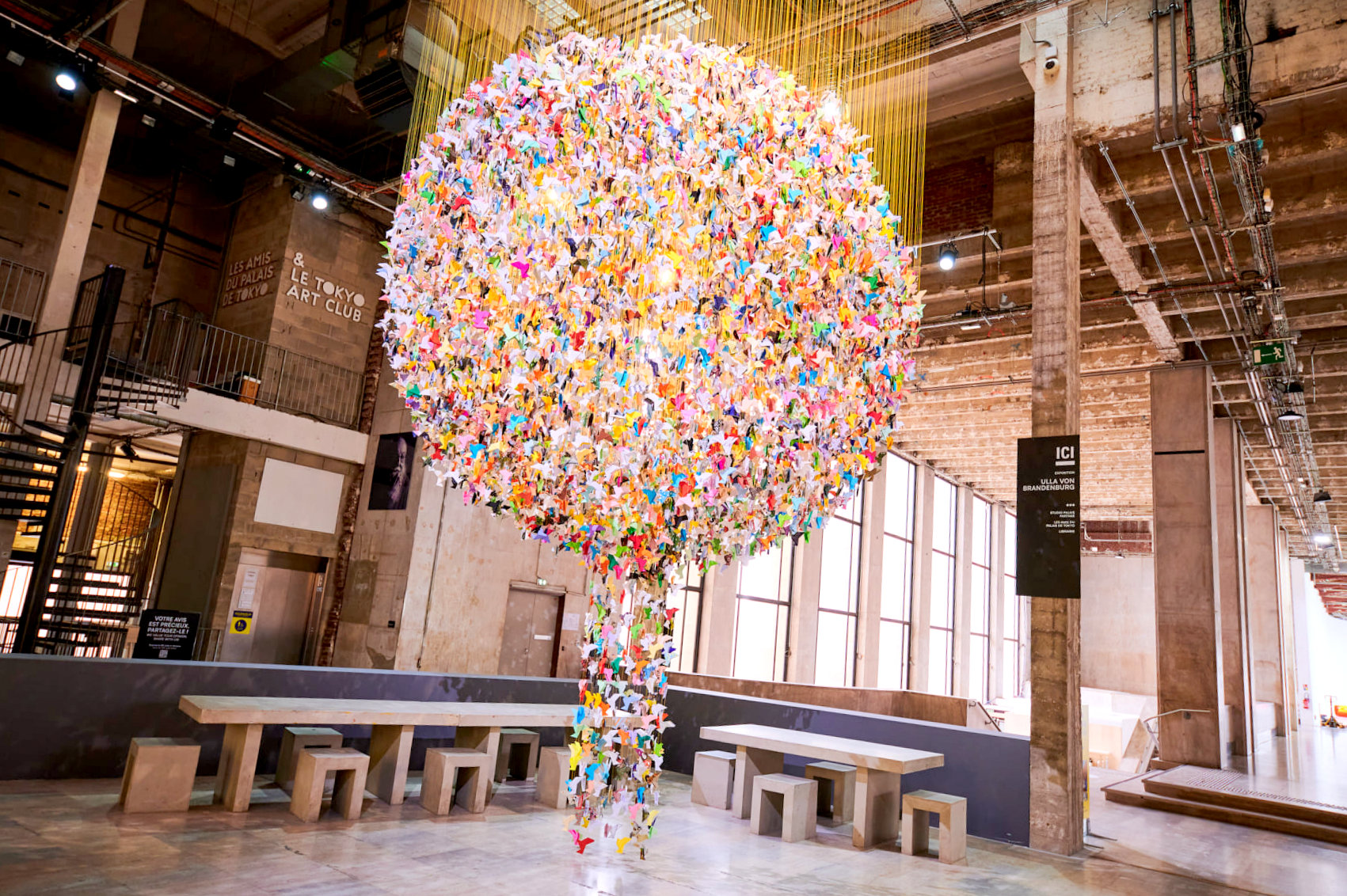
'Origami For Life' (2021) by Belgian designer Charles Kaisin

Since its inception, the school has organised charity fundraisers and humanitarian activities throughout its academic years which include the collect of clothing as well as school supplies and equipment for African schools; the Opération Pièces jaunes to finance the hospitalisation of children; Purina contests for the acquisition of guide dogs for the visually-impaired or its Christmas market. Every year since 2009, sister Monique, a representative from a children's charity in Cotonou, Republic of Benin visits the school, and pupils donate the proceeds of their Lent charity activities. In 2021, the Saint-Joseph and Saint-Michel students joined the 'Origami For Life' by the Engie foundation creating origamis later assembled by Belgian designer Charles Kaisin (1972) to create eight trees exhibited at the KANAL - Centre Pompidou in Brussels and at the Palais de Tokyo in Paris which raised 75,000 euros for the SAMU Social of Paris, a municipal humanitarian emergency service in France and worldwide whose purpose is to provide medical care and ambulatory nursing to homeless people and people in social distress.

=== Sports ===
The school is granted access to Solesmes' swimming pools, the Marie Amélie Le Fur Sports Hall and the Édouard Delberghe building's indoor courts and martial arts room, where they practice circus disciplines.

== See also ==
- Communes of the Nord department.
