= Helena Langhorne Powell =

English historian and educationalist

Helena Langhorne Powell (1862–1942) was an English historian and educationalist. She was Headmistress of Leeds Girls' High School, Principal of Cambridge Training College and Principal of St Mary's Training College, Lancaster Gate.

== Life ==
Helena Langhorne Powell was born on 15 September 1862. She was educated at Clapham High School and Newnham College, Cambridge, where she gained a first-class mark in History in 1884. She was Assistant Mistress at Oxford High School from 1885 to 1892, and Headmistress of Leeds High School from 1892 to 1903. She was Principal of Cambridge Training College from 1903 to 1908, and Principal of St Mary's Training College from 1908 to 1926. She died on 4 June 1942.

== Works ==
- Religious teaching in schools. A paper, 1905
- Women as Teachers of Religion, 1908
- (ed.) The Bede Histories
- History of the people of England; the Tudors and Stuarts, 1929
