= Piet de Jong (artist) =

Anglo-Dutch artist (1887–1967)

Piet Christiaan Leonardus de Jong (8 August 1887 – 20 April 1967) was an artist who worked on the illustration and reconstruction of archaeological sites in the Mediterranean, including Mycenae, Knossos, Eutresis, Gordion, and the Athenian Agora.

== Life and career ==
Piet Christiaan Leonardus de Jong was born in Leeds, England on 8 August 1887. His father, Jacques Leonardus de Jong, was a Dutch immigrant, and his mother, Rosa Teale de Jong, a Yorkshire native. Piet had two siblings: an older half-sister, Gwendolyn (b. 1880), and a younger brother, Arton Carl (b. 1893). For his education, he first attended the Leeds Modern School. Piet later attended the Leeds Institute of Science, Art, and Literature, where he studied architecture. After completing his studies, de Jong won several architectural prizes, including two from the West Yorkshire Society of Architects (prize in 1908, silver medal 1909). In 1912, Piet de Jong received the Soane Medallion which included a travel award of £50 from the Royal Institute of British Architects. With this prize money, he was able to travel to Italy in 1912 to study Classical architecture. In 1913, he returned to London as a member of the Leeds architectural firm Schofield and Berry. Also in 1913, de Jong designed his first and only building in England: the First Church of Christ Scientist, Leeds. In 1914, World War I broke out, and in 1916 he joined the army as a lance-corporal in the Army Cyclist Corps. Although the precise details of his participation in World War I are unknown, he most likely served as part of the East Riding Yeomanry.

Piet de Jong first travelled to Greece in 1919 as part of the post-war reconstruction programme for eastern Macedonia. At this time he first met the excavator of Mycenae, Alan Wace. In 1920, de Jong began work as an architect and archaeological illustrator for the Mycenae excavations. He worked on the Mycenae excavations until 1923, during which time he produced the famous reconstruction of Grave Circle A, Mycenae.

From the 1920s to the 1950s, de Jong applied his skills as architect and artist to the illustration, recording, and reconstruction of some of the most famous excavations in Mediterranean archaeology. In 1921, he worked for the excavations at Halae, under Hetty Goldman. Also in 1921, on 14 February, Piet de Jong married his wife Effie. At the time of her marriage, Effie was living in Athens and working as an English teacher. She accompanied Piet de Jong on many of his archaeological projects. His work at Mycenae earned him a positive reputation and in 1922, he was hired by Sir Arthur Evans to work on the recording and reconstruction of the palace at Knossos on Crete. In the role of excavation architect, de Jong succeeded Theodore Fyfe (architect at Knossos from 1900-1904) and Christian C.T. Doll, expanding considerably on their earlier reconstruction interventions. Unlike Fyfe and Doll, de Jong was the first Knossos architect who lived in Greece year round.

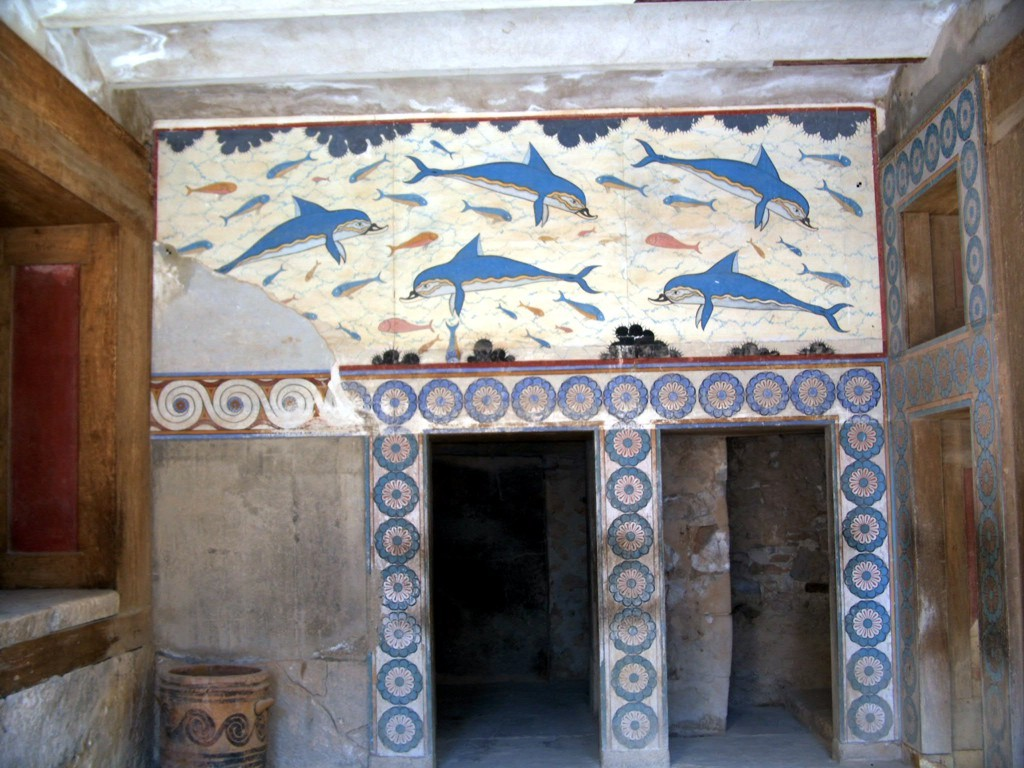
Piet de Jong's reconstruction of the dolphin fresco, Knossos

In 1923, de Jong was the first person appointed as the official architect for the British School at Athens. Many of the publications of archaeological finds produced by the British School during this period include plans, plates, and drawings by de Jong. From 1923 to 1926, de Jong worked at Sparta, and in 1924 at Eutresis. During the 1920s, he also worked at Zygouries, excavated by Carl Blegen, and at Corinth, under both Bert Hodge Hill and Leslie Shear.

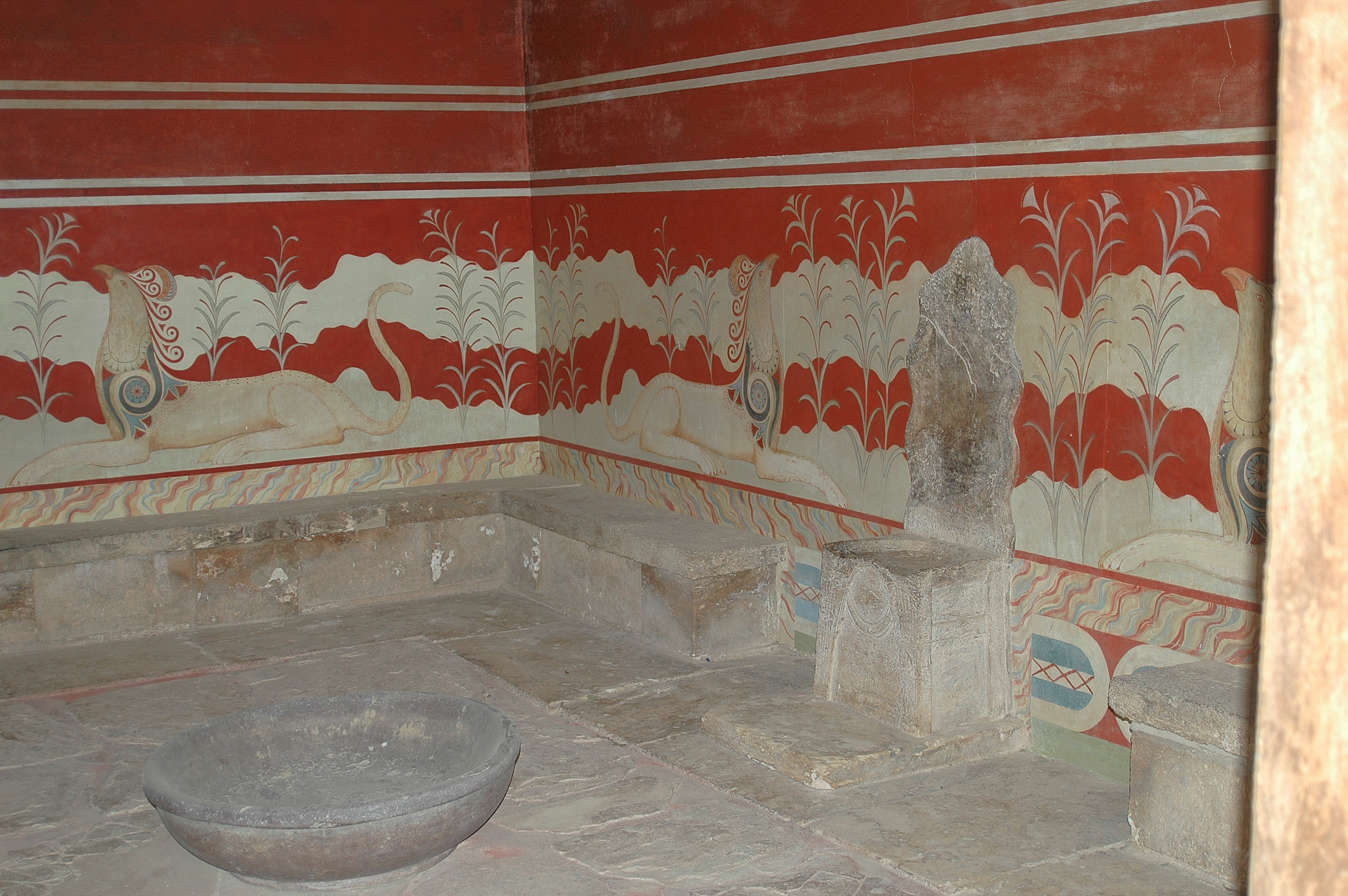
His reconstruction of the Throne Room, Knossos

Piet de Jong returned to Crete every year from 1922 to 1930. During this time, he designed and directed much of the reconstruction work at Knossos. This work included both architectural reconstruction (especially the Queen's Megaron and Throne Room), and frescos (the dolphin fresco). In the 1930s, de Jong produced drawings for the archaeological excavations at Perachora and Prosymna, and in 1932 began work as illustrator for the excavations at the Athenian Agora. The events of World War II forced de Jong to return to Leeds from 1939 to 1947.

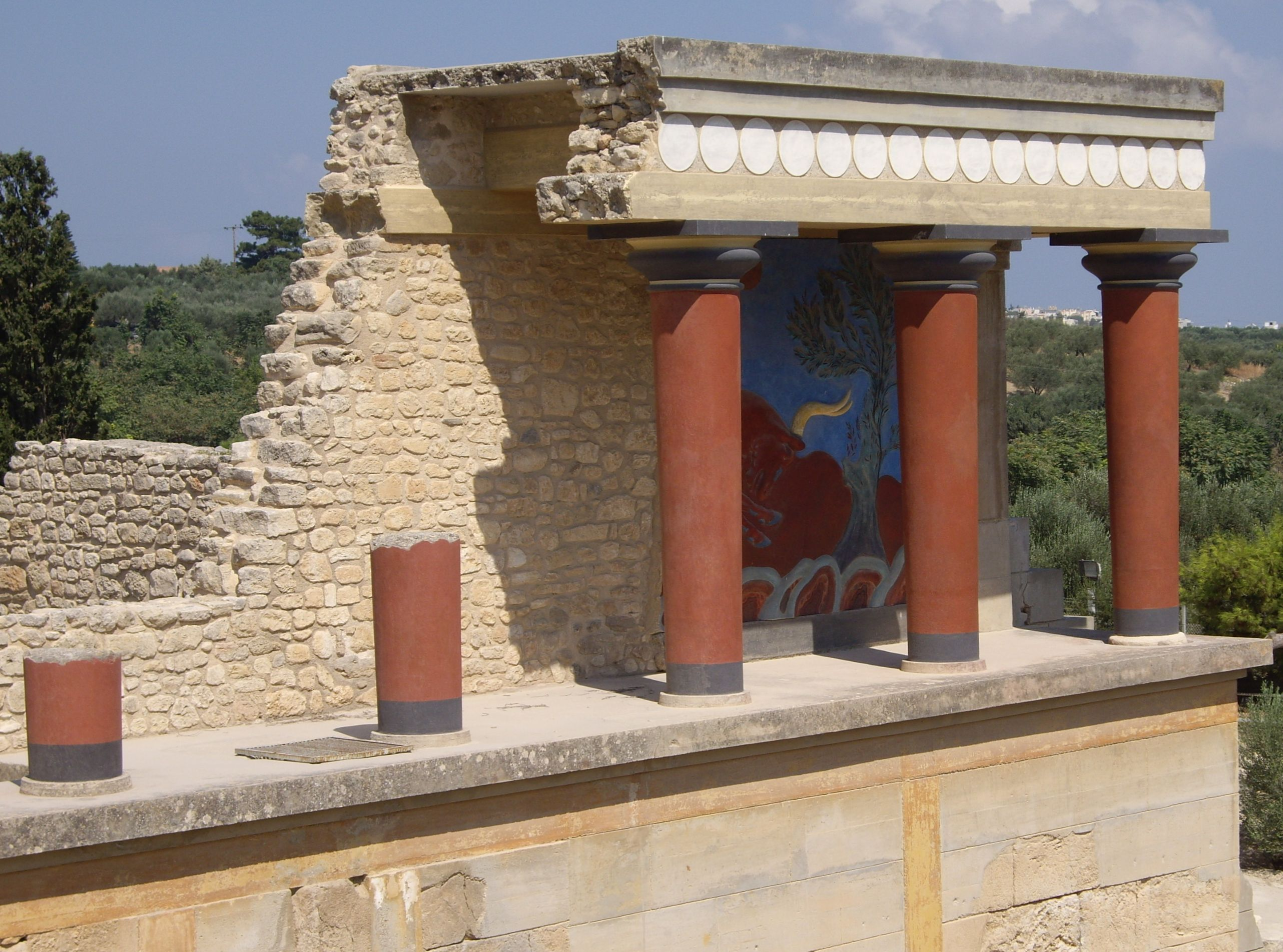
Piet de Jong's reconstruction of the palace at Knossos

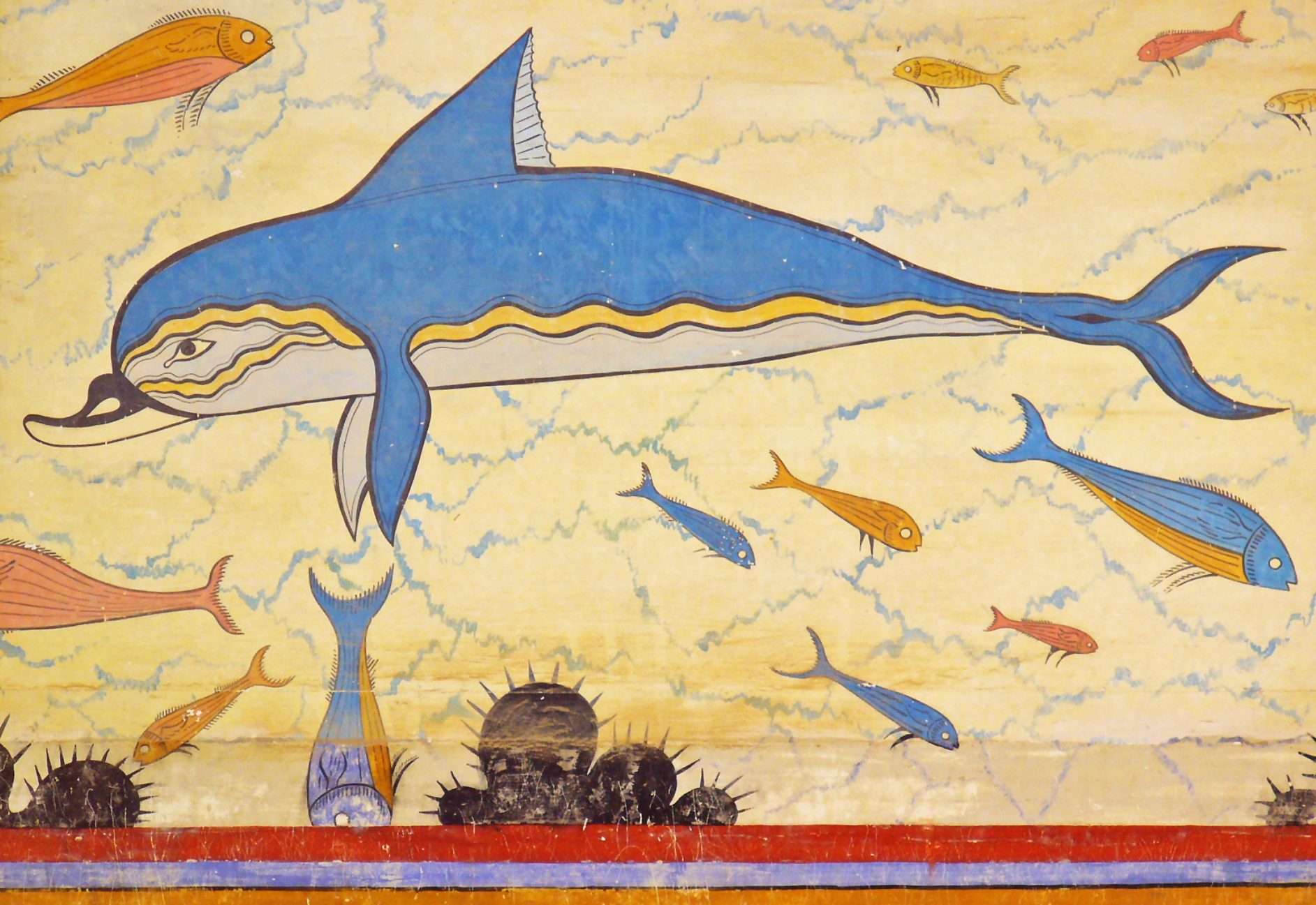
Delphinus delphis 02

In 1947, de Jong returned to Crete as the curator of Knossos. The Knossos excavations were now directed by Sinclair Hood, who continued to employ de Jong in the recording and reconstruction of the Knossos material. In 1952, de Jong relinquished his post as Knossos caretaker, but continued to produce watercolours and reconstructions both at Knossos (1957–61), and for a number of other archaeological projects. In 1957, he produced watercolour reconstructions of the fresco paintings from the so-called 'Painted House' at Gordion. Around the same time, de Jong also produced the plates for the material excavated by John Caskey at Kea. Until 1965, de Jong worked again for Carl Blegen at Pylos, where he produced his famous reconstructions of both the Palace of Nestor and its ornate floor. His final archaeological assignment, the watercolour reproduction of several Minoan frescos, began on Crete in 1966. While still in Crete and at work on these frescos, Piet de Jong died on 20 April 1967 at the age of 79. A bequest left by de Jong to the British School at Athens made possible the extension of the Stratigraphic Museum at Knossos.

=== Archaeological illustration and reconstruction ===
As an archaeological illustrator and architect, de Jong was responsible for both the accurate recording and the reconstruction of a wide variety of archaeological materials including: pottery, frescos, figurines or other small objects, and architecture. Watercolours, both translucent and opaque (gouache), on paper, were de Jong's preferred medium for the execution of archaeological illustrations. De Jong also produced many pencil and ink drawings.

Piet de Jong was a talented artist. However, he was not trained as an archaeologist. Many of his reconstructions take extreme artistic licence in the interpretation of the archaeological remains. For example, his reconstruction of the dolphin fresco at Knossos, is formulated around a very small number of fresco fragments.

In addition, de Jong did not produce a style of documentation which would be considered sufficient for modern, quantitative, standards of archaeological recording. Another group of examples is de Jong's illustration of ceramic finds. Modern drawings of archaeological ceramics tend to include both a 'section', or profile drawing, of the vessel and an 'elevation', a depiction of its outside face. In contrast, de Jong's illustrations do not include a section and elevation, but rather tend to depict the entire outside profile of the vessel, often from a distorted perspective, to make as many of the object's defining attributes visible to the viewer as possible.

=== Caricatures ===
Piet de Jong was also a talented caricaturist. Forty-four de Jong caricatures, also in watercolour, have been published. The majority of the subjects for these paintings were archaeologists from the excavations for which de Jong worked as architect. Some of the more famous of his scholarly subjects include Sir Arthur Evans, excavator of Knossos, and Alan Wace, excavator of Mycenae. Other caricatures feature students and other 'hellenophiles' living in Athens, associated with either the American School of Classical Studies at Athens or the British School at Athens. In his will, de Jong bequeathed his personal caricatures and other watercolours to Minoan archaeologist Sinclair Hood; these artworks have been held in archives of the Ashmolean Museum since 2003.
