= Institution Saint-Michel =

Institution Saint-Michel, Solesmes
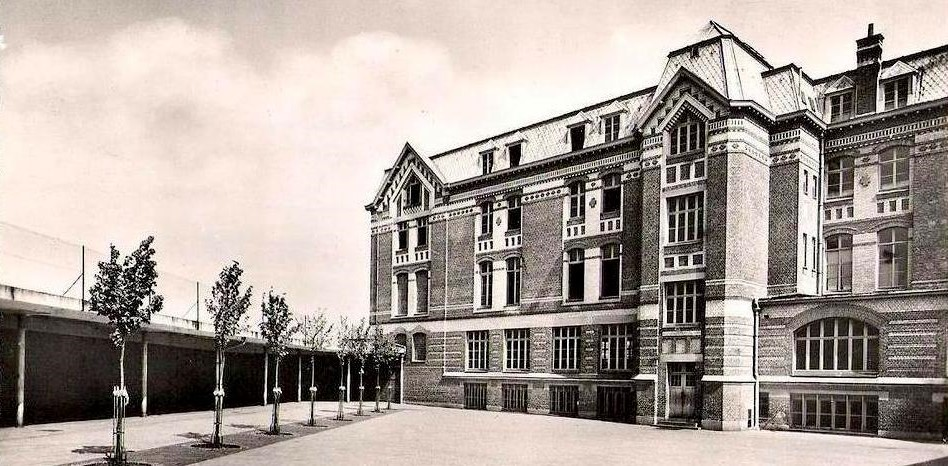
- Inner Façade (2nd Courtyard; 1950s).
- Former names: Little Religious Seminary Saint-Michel (Petit Séminaire)
- Established: 13 May 1924 by the Roman Catholic Archdiocese of Cambrai constituted in 580
- Parent institution: Academy of Lille
- Religious affiliation: Catholic
- Academic affiliations: Zone B
- Officer in charge: Christophe Lobry.
- Academic staff: Faculty: (±) 110 including administratives
- Students: (±) 1000
- Location: 13 Rue Emile Zola, Solesmes, Nord, Hauts-de-France, 59730, France; 50.184°N 3.5039°E
- Language: French; German; English; Spanish; Latin; Sign language.
- Colours: Green & Turquoise .
- Website: St-michel-solesmes.com.

Institution Saint Michel: Collège and Lycée (French pronunciation: [ɛ̃stitysjɔ̃ sɛ̃ miʃɛl]) is a Catholic secondary school with boarding facilities located in Solesmes (Picard: Solinmes), France. Founded in 1924 by the Roman Catholic Archdiocese of Cambrai constituted in 580, it is now also contractually regulated by the Academy of Lille, a ramification of the French Ministry of National Education, Higher Education and Research. As of 2018, it welcomes within centuries-old châteauesque edifices around a thousand students from nearly a hundred municipalities within a radius extending twenty kilometers.

== History ==
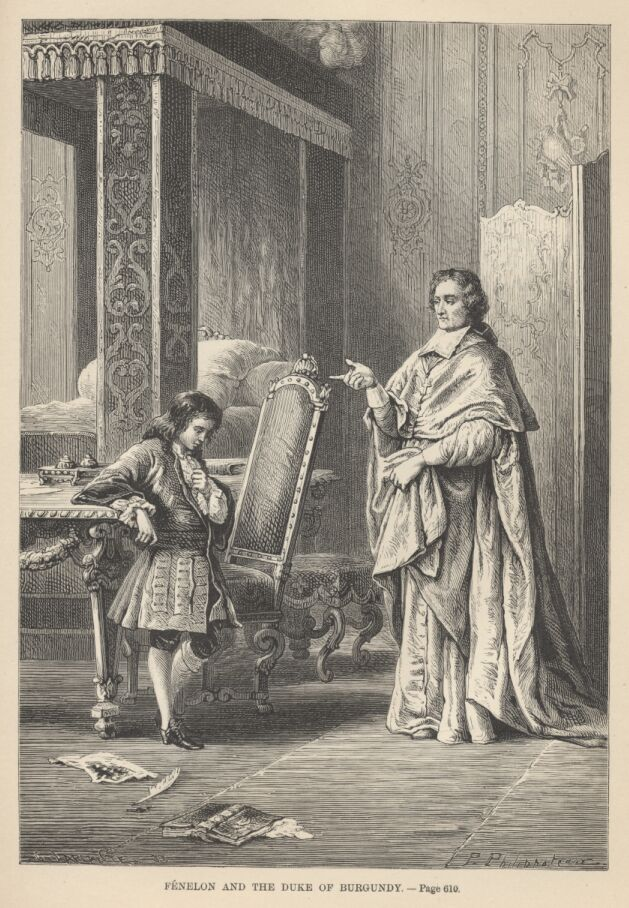
François de la Mothe-Fénelon (6 August 1651 – 7 January 1715) and the Duke of Burgundy

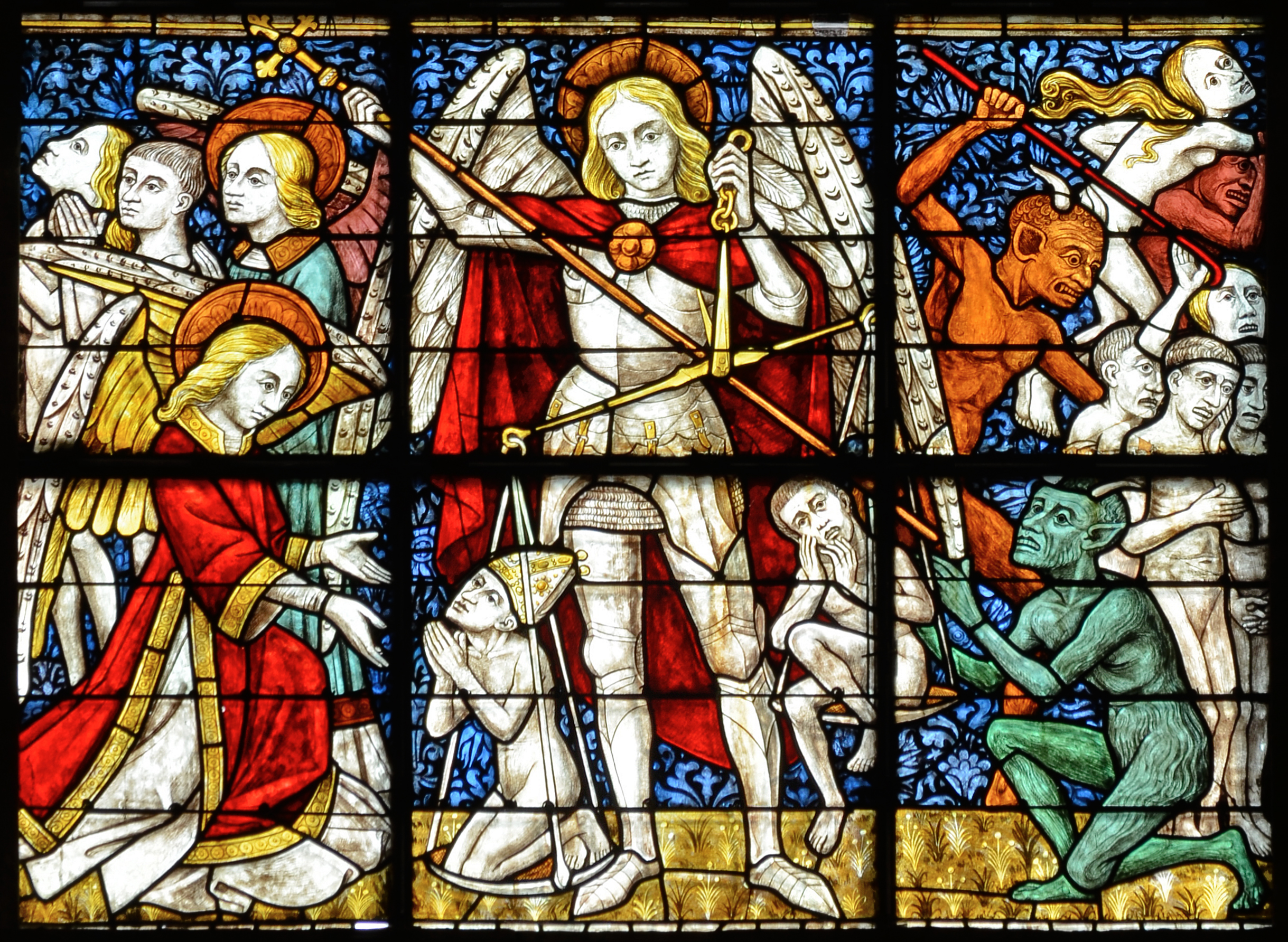
Archangel Michael weighing souls, stained glass (1876/1916) Coutances Cathedral, France

The Institution was first established on 13 May 1924 by Archbishop Jean-Arthur Chollet (21 November 1913 – 2 December 1952) as a ramification of the Roman Catholic Archdiocese of Cambrai itself erected in the late 6th century (Latin: Archdiocesis Cameracensis; French: Archidiocèse de Cambrai) and placed under its aegis. It was formerly known as the Little Religious Seminary (French: Petit Séminaire Saint-Michel de Solesmes). In the early Middle Ages, the Diocese of Cambrai (Lotharingia) was first ruled by West Frankish sovereign Charles the Bald in accordance with the implementation of the Treaty of Meerssen (870). Throughout History, it has been governed and regimented by such figures as the German king Henry the Fowler (925) or the Duke Gilbert of Lorraine (939). All immunities that had so far been granted to the Bishops of Cambrai were ratified by King Otto the Great (23 November 912 – 7 May 973). In the early 1000s, this Bishopric was elevated to Imperial State by Emperor Henry II, to protectorate by Maximilian I of Habsburg in the late 15th century, was united to the Lower Rhenish–Westphalian Circle in 1512 and integrated into the See of Mechelen in 1559 by Philip II of Spain. It was finally declared French under the Roi Soleil under the Treaty of Nijmegen (1678) following the Siege of Cambrai the preceding year. It was affiliated to the Nord through the Napoleonic Concordat of 1801. Among, the plethora of Diocese of Cambrai' most conspicuous individuals are found Charles the Good (1084–1127); poet and author François de la Mothe-Fénelon (1651–1715); French Academy philosopher Gratry (1805–1872) and composer Guillaume Dufay (1397–1474). The Institution remained called the Little Religious Seminary up until 1965 when the boarding school opened its doors to external boys and subsequently to girls in 1968. The institution's eponymous Patron is Saint Michael known in the Old Testament as chief opponent of Satan and commander of the Army of God who is alone mentioned in the Litany of the Saints which omitted Saint Gabriel and Saint Raphael.

=== Celebrations ===
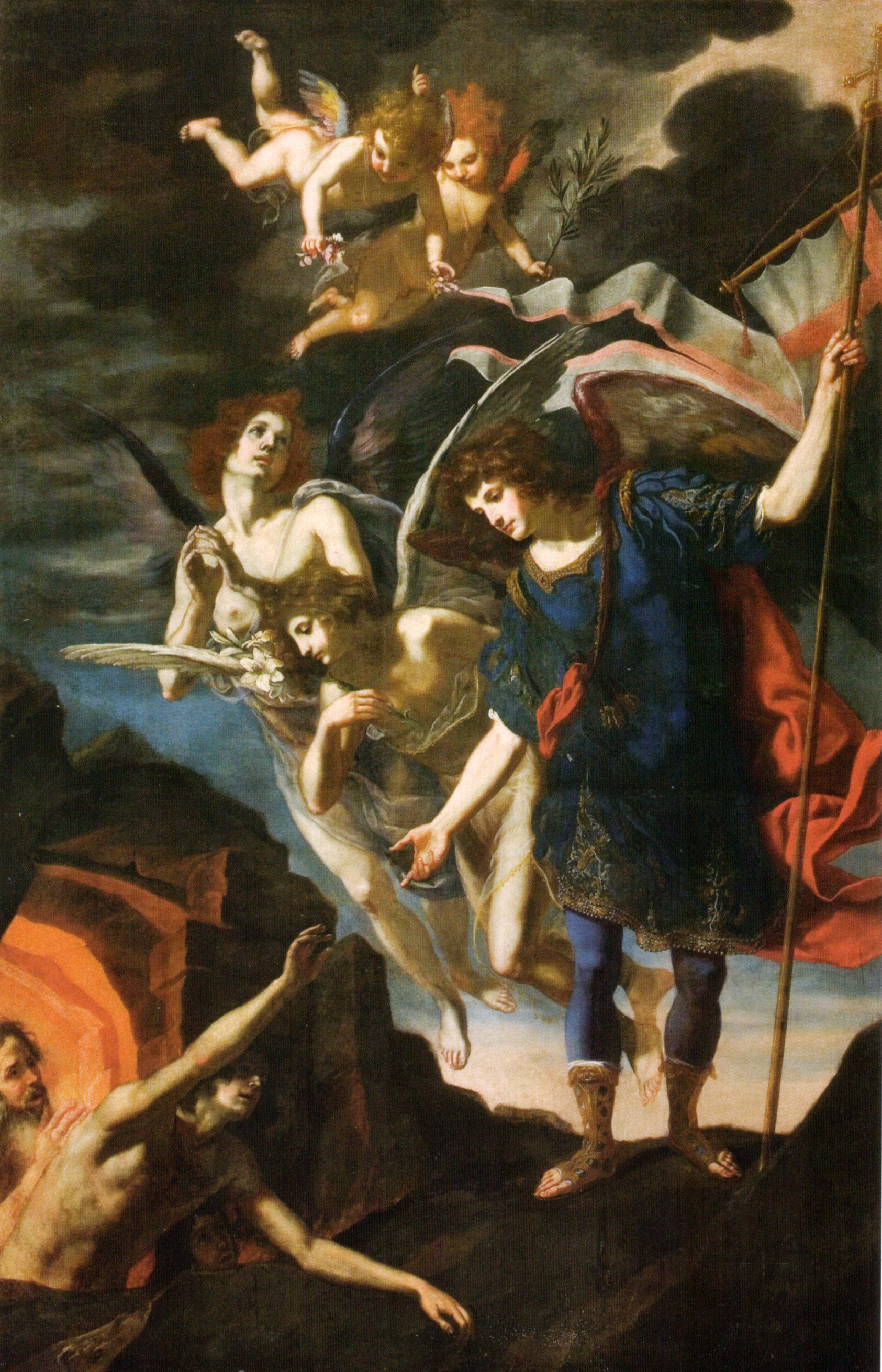
Archangel Michael reaching to save souls in purgatory, by Jacopo Vignali, 17th century

- The Russian Orthodox community established in Le Cateau-Cambresis was yearly invited to celebrate a mass of Byzantine Rite which differed with the Roman Rite in that they were two-hour-long services with songs in Russian without organ accompaniment, the consuming oscillating censers were held at the end of imposing chains and communion was under both species, bread and wine.
- From the 1940s to the 1960s, on 24 December, students would be waking up to canticles and hymns through loud-speakers and would be treated to an ameliorated breakfast with brioche and hot chocolate.
- Carols such as Stille Nacht, Heilige Nacht! or classics from German musicologist Michael Praetorius' (1571–1621) Syntagma Musicum (1614-1620) and Hymnodia Sionia (1611; Advent: 5. Alvus tumescit virginis & Christmas: 26. A solis ortus cardine; 27. Summo Parenti gloria), would be sang during the Midnight Mass. The Christmas Day was really a holiday. After the Low Mass and the Solemn Mass, students were gifted an improved meal with baptized wine.

=== Declamations ===
From the 1940s to the 1970s, students were alternately required to chant or read aloud from the official academic corpora unanimously agreed upon by the institution's on-site officiating abbots and priests. They were standing in front of a lectern in the small refectory and the dining hall on which books were placed following liturgical traditions. Being designated cantor or precentor was also used as punishment for misbehaving pupils. Main works were:

- General Baron de Marbot's Memoirs (1891) by Jean-Baptiste Antoine Marcellin Marbot (18 August 1782 – 16 November 1854).

=== Bombing of May 1944 ===
Each year, Saint-Michel's students commemorate the Armistice of May 8, 1945 but also the bombing of Solesmes on May 9, 1944 which greatly impacted the institution. From February to June 1944, the Allies intensified their destructive efforts on roads and rails to isolate the Normandy landings and to dupe the Germans into believing that this landing would take place in the nearer Pas-de-Calais. General Eisenhower encapsulated those successful bombings "as the greatest contribution to the success of Overlord" (June 6, 44). On May 9, 1944; the 416th Bomb Group successfully destroyed the Aarschot railway station between Brussels and Antwerp with several Douglas Boston III Havocs each carrying four 250-kg bombs and the 409th Bomb Group caused death and destruction in Solesmes with the same equipment. On May 9, at around 8:15 am, the air alert loud sirens prompted all children who went to school to go back home and around 10:15, two explosions were heard as four bombs were accidentally detached from the freight deck of an aircraft and landed on the Chemin de Vertigneulof the Institution Saint-Michel causing the first victims. A fifth bomb will not explode and will be destroyed a few days later by the Germans, near Chant des Oiseaux. Seventy bombs exploded in the city-center killing fifty-eight people including twenty-two children and the destruction of ninety-seven buildings while the wounded were transferred to the hospital of Le Cateau. The town of Solesmes received the Croix de Guerre 1939–1945 (France). Historians revealed that it was the train station that was targeted with its ramifications to the sugar refinery and the electro-tubes. The American airmen had orders; when they were not carrying out their mission; to drop their bombs on secondary targets. Moreover, at 3500 m altitude the accuracy of a shot was 1 km but there was barely 500 meters between the station and the city-center.

== International ==
=== Twinning Arrangements ===
The Institution Saint-Michel has long established exchange partnerships with education centers from across the Western world including with the:

- United States: Patrick Henry High School in San Diego, California.
- United States: Hampshire Regional High School in Westhampton, Massachusetts.
- United Kingdom: Grammar School at Leeds (GSAL) in Leeds.
- Germany: Goethe-Gymnasium in Düsseldorf.
- Poland: 2nd High School of Mikołaj Kopernik in Cieszyn (Poland).

=== Arts and Culture ===
- In their first years, Saint-Michel students go on 'Green Classes' which are educational retreats where students alternate classes and outdoor activities (horseback ri, ding, hiking, climbing, caving, canoeing, boating or fishing) for a period of few weeks.
- Saint-Michel regularly hosts Canadian, American, Japanese and South-Korean young people as foreign language tutors in residence.
- Many excursions are organized for exchange partner students such as to the Louvre and Library of the National Assembly in Paris, the Lace Museum in Caudry, the Commonwealth site of Le Quesnoy, Le Touquet-Paris-Plage, the Matisse Museum in Le Cateau-Cambrésis or the Museum of Fine Arts of Valenciennes. With regards to language and cultural field trips, Saint-Michel students usually go to Leeds, Rome, Amsterdam, Edinburgh, London, Berlin and Florence.
- Historical fieldtrips and educational getaways include the Mémorial de Caen war memorial in Normandy, the Douaumont Ossuary; the city of Verdun and its trenches; the Lewarde mining center; Juno, Omaha & Utah Beaches Museums; the Pegasus Bridge; the D-Day museum among many others.
- For those undertaking the 'Theatre Studies Pathway', Pr. Frédéric Valet organizes myriad excursions to plays including at the Théâtre de Cambrai, the Théâtre du Marais or the Opéra Bastille while devising and putting productions on in Chti or Picard with students.
- In June 2018, Saint-Michel's students were awarded for their participation in the National Contest for the Defense and Illustration of the French language organized by the members association of the Order of Academic Palms (French: Ordre des Palmes académiques).
- During the summer holidays, the Saint-Michel infrastructures host the children summer camps convened by the Communauté de communes du Pays Solesmois and it has also hosted the École Saint-Joseph (Solesmes)'s end-of-the-year show for over twenty-five years as of 2018.

== See also ==
- Communes of the Nord department.
