= The Golden Beam =

Former church and school building in West Yorkshire, England

Coordinates: 53°49′01″N 01°34′16″W

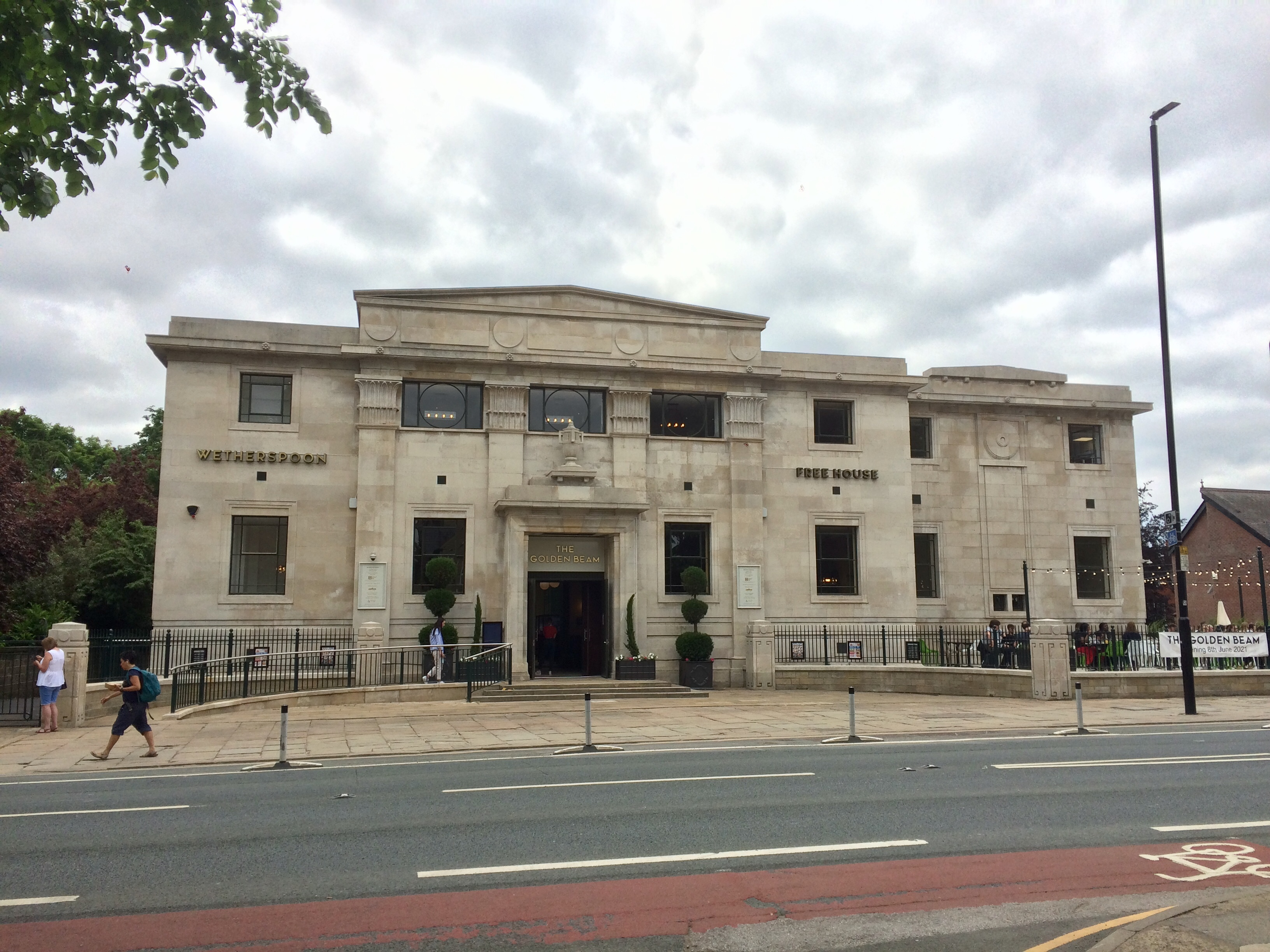
- Former names: Church of Christ, Scientist; Elinor Lupton Centre

General information
- Type: Church (1912–1986); School arts centre (1986–2010); Pub (2021–)
- Architectural style: Egyptian Revival with Art Deco influences
- Location: Headingley, Leeds, England
- Named for: Elinor Lupton (as school building); Painting by Atkinson Grimshaw (as pub)
- Opened: 1912, extended 1934
- Owner: JD Wetherspoon

Technical details
- Material: Portland stone

Design and construction
- Architects: Piet de Jong; William Peel Schofield
- Designations

Listed Building – Grade II
- Designated: 5 August 1976
- Reference no.: 1255938

The Golden Beam is a pub and Grade II listed building located in the Headingley area of Leeds, West Yorkshire, England. It was built in c. 1912 for the Church of Christ, Scientist, and was known as the Elinor Lupton Centre from 1986 to 2010 when it was a school arts centre. It was designed by Piet de Jong and William Peel Schofield from the architectural firm Schofield and Berry. Constructed in white Portland stone in a mixed style of Egyptian Revival and Art Deco, it was originally built as a Sunday school in c. 1912–1914, extended in the 1930s with a church building and then used by the Leeds Girls' High School as a theatre and music centre from 1986 until 2010. The structure has architectural significance in the locality due to its distinct style and use of materials; many original features and fittings survive, including the entrance foyer, two staircases and a glazed lantern in the auditorium roof.

The building was unoccupied between 2010 and 2021, with windows and doors boarded up and elevations disfigured by graffiti. The building was included in the 2018 Heritage at Risk Register by Leeds Civic Trust, where it was given 'vulnerable' status. The current owner, JD Wetherspoon, put forward proposals for conversion into a pub and hotel which were locally controversial, with the project facing a planning enquiry and licensing difficulties. Planning permission and an alcohol licence were granted by the City Council in 2020, and the building was converted into a large pub, named The Golden Beam after a painting by Atkinson Grimshaw, which opened June 2021.

== Architecture and design ==
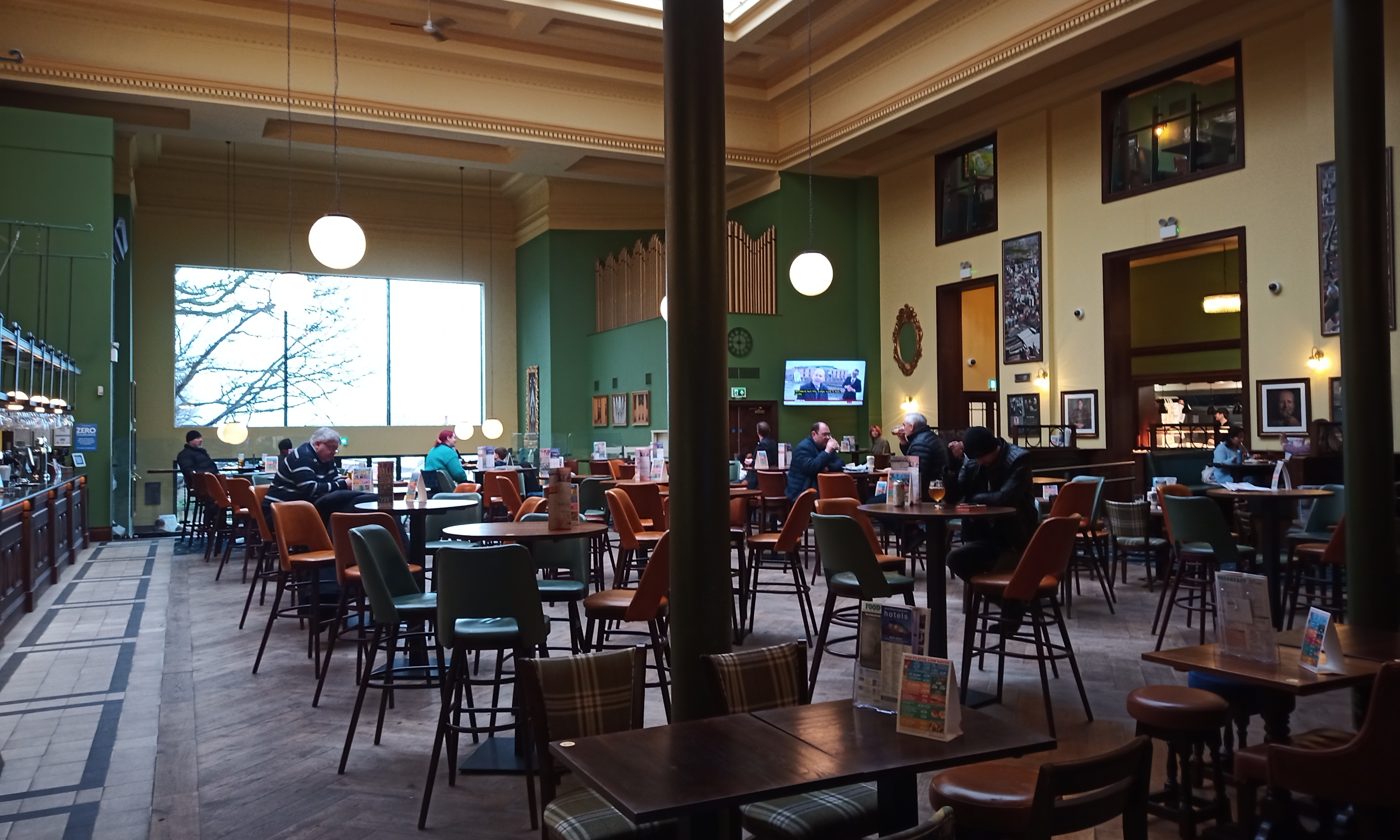
Interior

The distinction and significance of the building, first designed as a church, is derived from its mixed architectural style, which has elements drawn from all three of the Egyptian Revival, classical Greek and Art Deco genres. The Egyptian influences – a style found nowhere else in Leeds other than Temple Works (1836) in Holbeck – include the papyrus-based capitals topping its pilasters, and the three entrances with moulded stone architraves with amphorae above. Several pediments comprise the most classical part of the design; a Greek key pattern adorns the decorative gate piers – Portland stone by dressed gritstone walls, while a disc motif is prominent on each of the main elevations. Art Deco characteristics are found mostly internally, particularly the foyer and auditorium. The paving to the front creates a wide plaza effect, complemented by the setting back of the property from the main road; opening up the property in an area which is characteristically narrow. Many original features and fittings survive, including the entrance foyer, two staircases and a glazed lantern in the auditorium roof. The hall — the former church space — had raked seating for 650 people, with a stage and the remains of an organ at one end.

The building consists of two storeys, plus a basement, all faced in Portland stone. Headingley, a village turned affluent suburb after the Industrial Revolution, predominantly used the local Millstone Grit (see Geology of Yorkshire) for its Victorian villas, and red brick for terraced workers' housing, as its architectural materials. Therefore, the Portland stone exterior from 1912 was unprecedented not only in Headingley, but also in Leeds city centre, aside from the contemporary Pearl Chambers on The Headrow (1911). By the time of the building's 1930s extension, the material had come into fashion for important buildings in the city, for example the Civic Hall (1933) and Queens Hotel (1937).

== History ==
The site, located on the corner of Headingley Lane and Richmond Road, was originally part of the grounds of the neighbouring Buckingham House, containing some small outbuildings. The Church of Christ, Scientist, a movement founded in 1879 in Boston, Massachusetts, began the process of opening its first Leeds site around 1912 by setting a competition for the design of a church and Sunday school. It was won by the Leeds firm of architects Schofield and Berry. William Peel Schofield was a local architect who qualified in 1906, having attended the Leeds School of Art and been an assistant at two Leeds architects' practices. The church was the only building in England designed by the firm's employee Piet de Jong, later internationally known as an archaeological artist.

During 1912–1914, the intended Sunday school was constructed, the smaller western part of the current building, but the construction of the main church was delayed by World War I and consequent labour shortages. Church services were temporarily held in the 250-seat assembly room of the new Sunday school during the delay; the actual Sunday school used classrooms on the first floor. (Note: The Historic England listing description incorrectly records that the main church was built first and that the western part was a later extension; the opposite is the case.)

In 1923 construction resumed, and in October 1934 the church was completed in the same style as the 1912 building; it was consecrated on 12 May 1935. The extension is assumed to be by William Peel Schofield, the same architect who oversaw the first part, although presumably to designs made before his death in 1926. The total cost was over £38,000.

In 1976, the building was given a Grade II listing by Historic England as a building of special architectural or historic interest. By 1986, after fifty years in full use as a church, the First Church of Christ, Scientist experienced decreasing congregation numbers and sold the building for £230,000 to Leeds Girls' High School, whose main site was very close by in Headingley. The school and church shared the building until 1992 when the First Church of Christ, Scientist moved to a smaller property on Otley Road, Headingley. LGHS used the building until 2010 as a theatre and music centre, and named it after Elinor Lupton (1886–1979), former Lady Mayoress of Leeds and member of the wealthy land-owning Lupton family of Newton Park Estate who had achieved prominence in the 17th century as woollen cloth merchants. Elinor Lupton was a school governor for 54 years and is credited by The Grammar School at Leeds (LGHS's successor) with funding the purchase of the centre, through a legacy as she had died seven years previously.

The site was closed by LGHS in 2010 as it had merged with Leeds Grammar School to form the Grammar School at Leeds and was moving all students to a new purpose-built campus at Alwoodley.

=== Recent history ===
The building was unoccupied from 2010 to 2020 and was boarded up and heavily graffitied. The Elinor Lupton Centre was marketed for sale in 2011, but with the unusual layout of the building and high cost of refurbishment, this was not successful despite several years on the open market. Various interested parties considered the site for uses including apartments, a wedding venue, gym, place of worship, art gallery, live venue and community centre. Conditional offers were received by CITU (a developer) for a multi-purpose leisure venue, aql for a data centre, and David Lynn intending to lease to The Gym Group, but these ultimately all fell through. Community organisations such as Headingley Development Trust and Leeds Music Hub also entered discussions without making a formal offer.

An approach and purchase was made in 2014 by JD Wetherspoon, a British pub company with a reputation for converting problem buildings into pub/restaurant facilities. While planning permission was obtained for change of use of the property into a public house at appeal in 2016, the company's attempts at securing a premises licence for the site were unsuccessful; in 2017, a judge at Leeds Magistrates' Court upheld Leeds City Council's decision to refuse an alcohol licence, citing "fundamental contradictions" at the heart of the company's application, such as the suggestion that the establishment would concentrate on serving food while simultaneously stating that it would offer "three for £5" deals on shots. Wetherspoon subsequently decided to apply to operate the building as a 52-bedroom hotel instead, but with extensions to allow more rooms for purposes of viability, especially as the Elinor Lupton Centre requires significant refurbishment and restoration. It stated that "We would hope that an investment of approximately £5m–£6m in Leeds should be welcomed as it will generate 100 new jobs and provide first class hotel facilities for this part of the City, close to the famous Headingley cricket and rugby ground."

Each proposed pub and hotel scheme has found vocal opposition during the planning process from residents and local groups, generally on the grounds of creating noise and disturbance, overprovision of pubs in Headingley (many part of the Otley Run), and parking congestion. The hotel application was withdrawn by Wetherspoon in October 2019, while the permission for public house use from 2016 was renewed in November 2019 by Leeds City Council. An alcohol licence was granted in February 2020, with a condition the pub does not permit entry to people it has reason to believe are participants in the Otley Run, removing the only barrier on refurbishment work commencing.

Conversion into a pub was completed in June 2021, with the new pub named The Golden Beam after the painting A Golden Beam by the artist John Atkinson Grimshaw – who lived nearby on Cliff Road near Woodhouse Ridge – which sold at Christie's for £223,750 in 2001. It has retained the original auditorium as its main ground-floor bar area. Two floors of eating and drinking areas of around 8,000 square feet (740 m^{2}) were created as well as large outside terraces, and 75 associated jobs. The existing church organ façade was repurposed as a feature fireplace.

== Gallery ==
Exterior

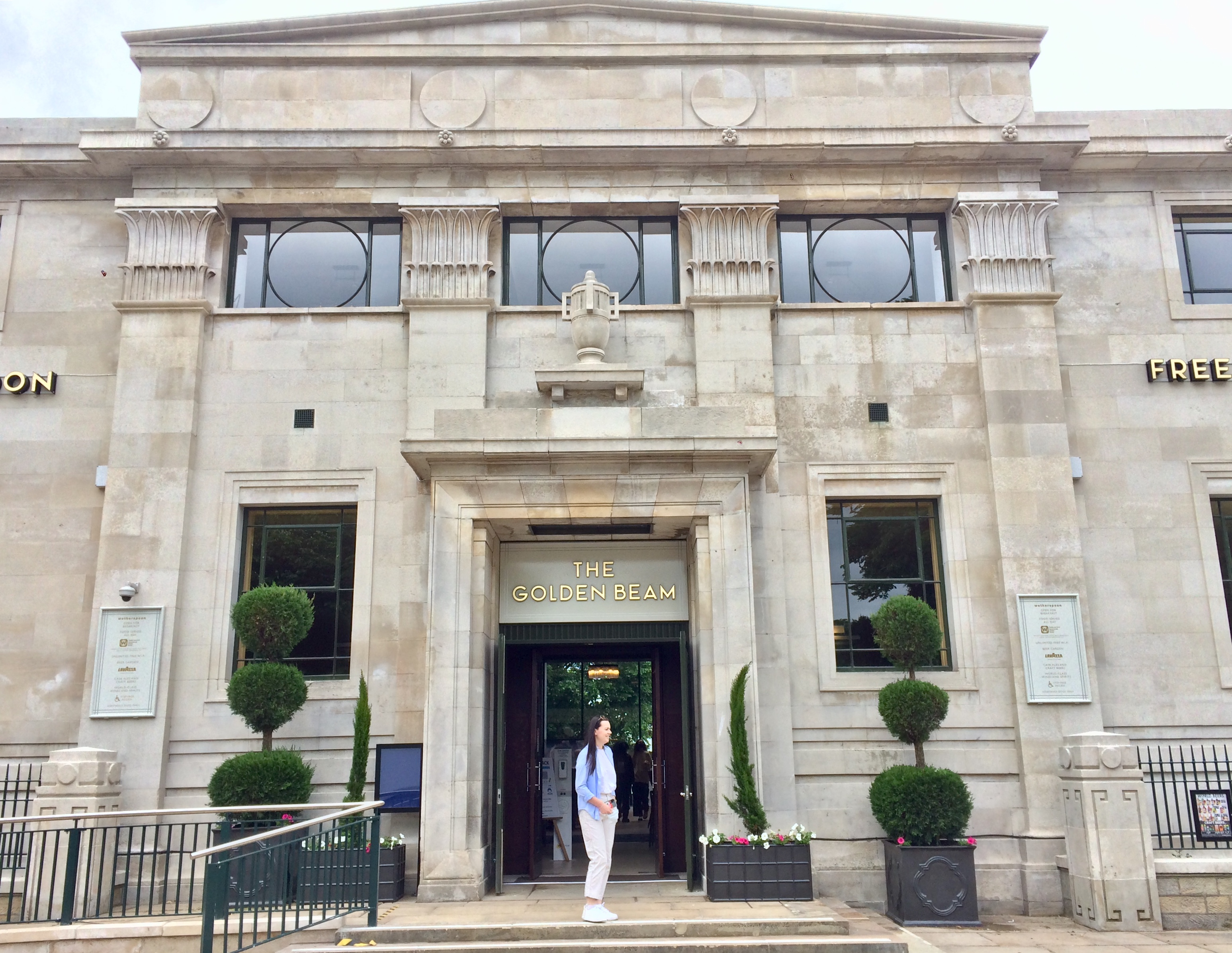
Front elevation, including pilasters and main entrance with architrave

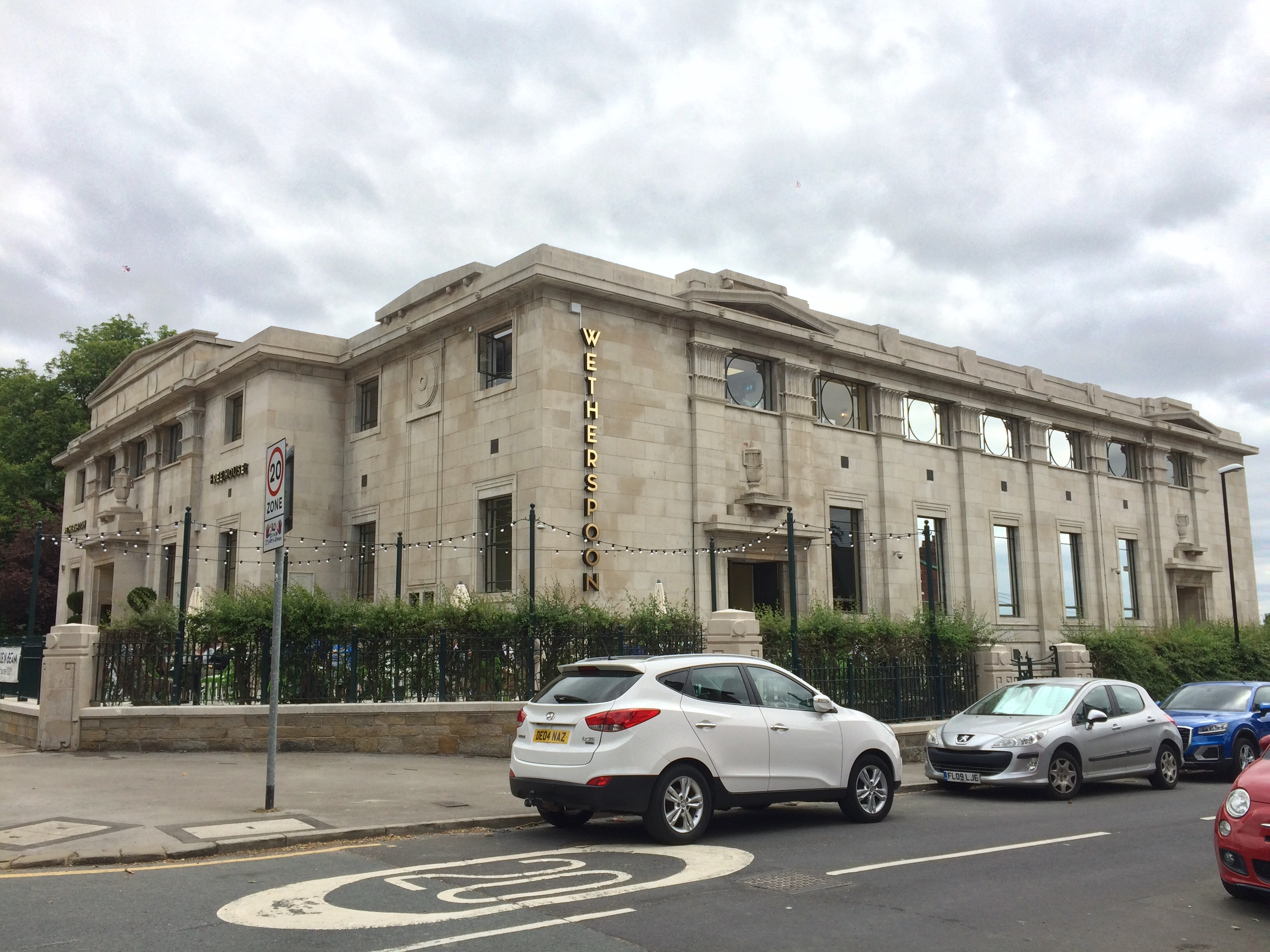
The 1912 section of the building, fronting Richmond Road

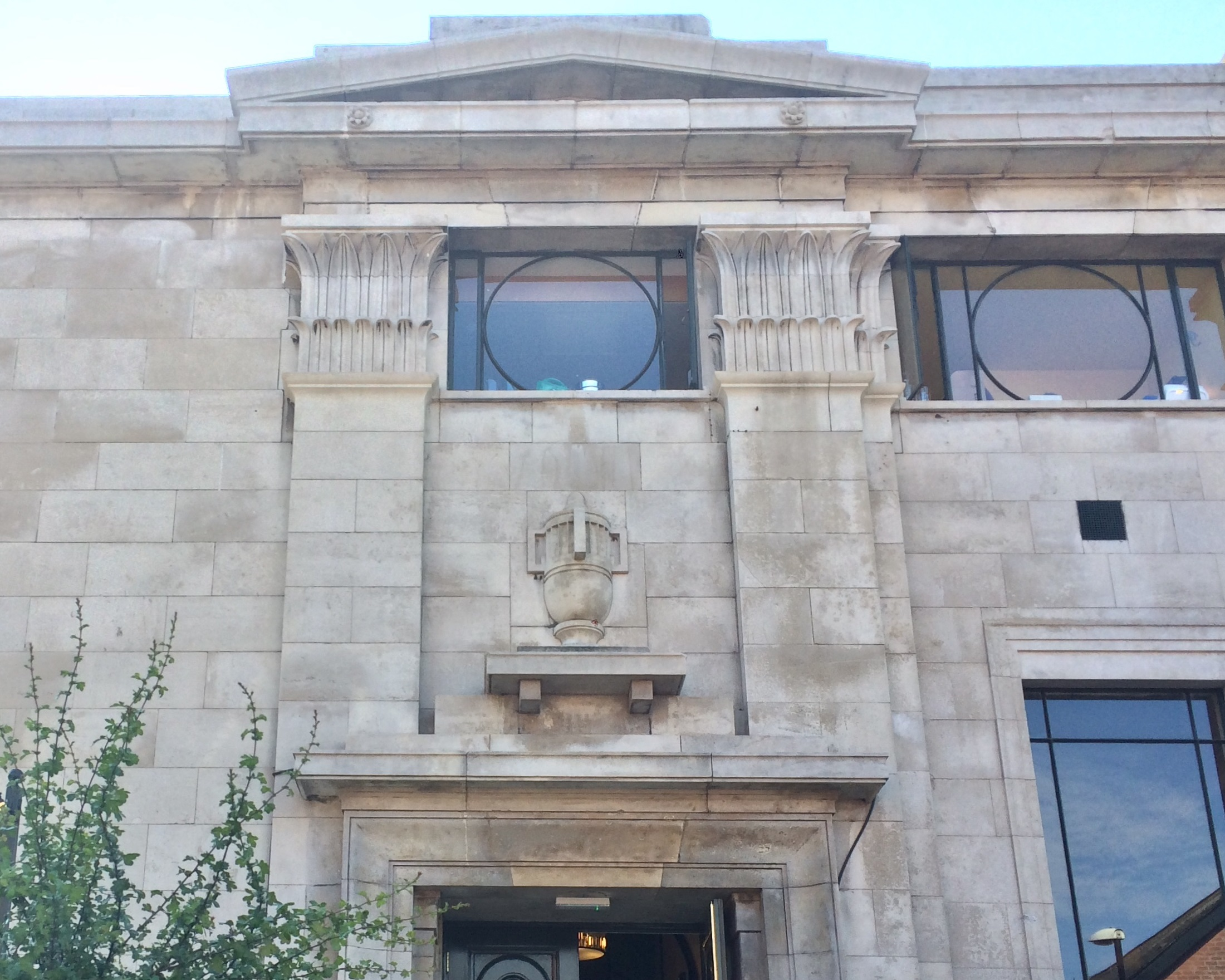
Architectural detail above side entrance, including carved capitals and amphora

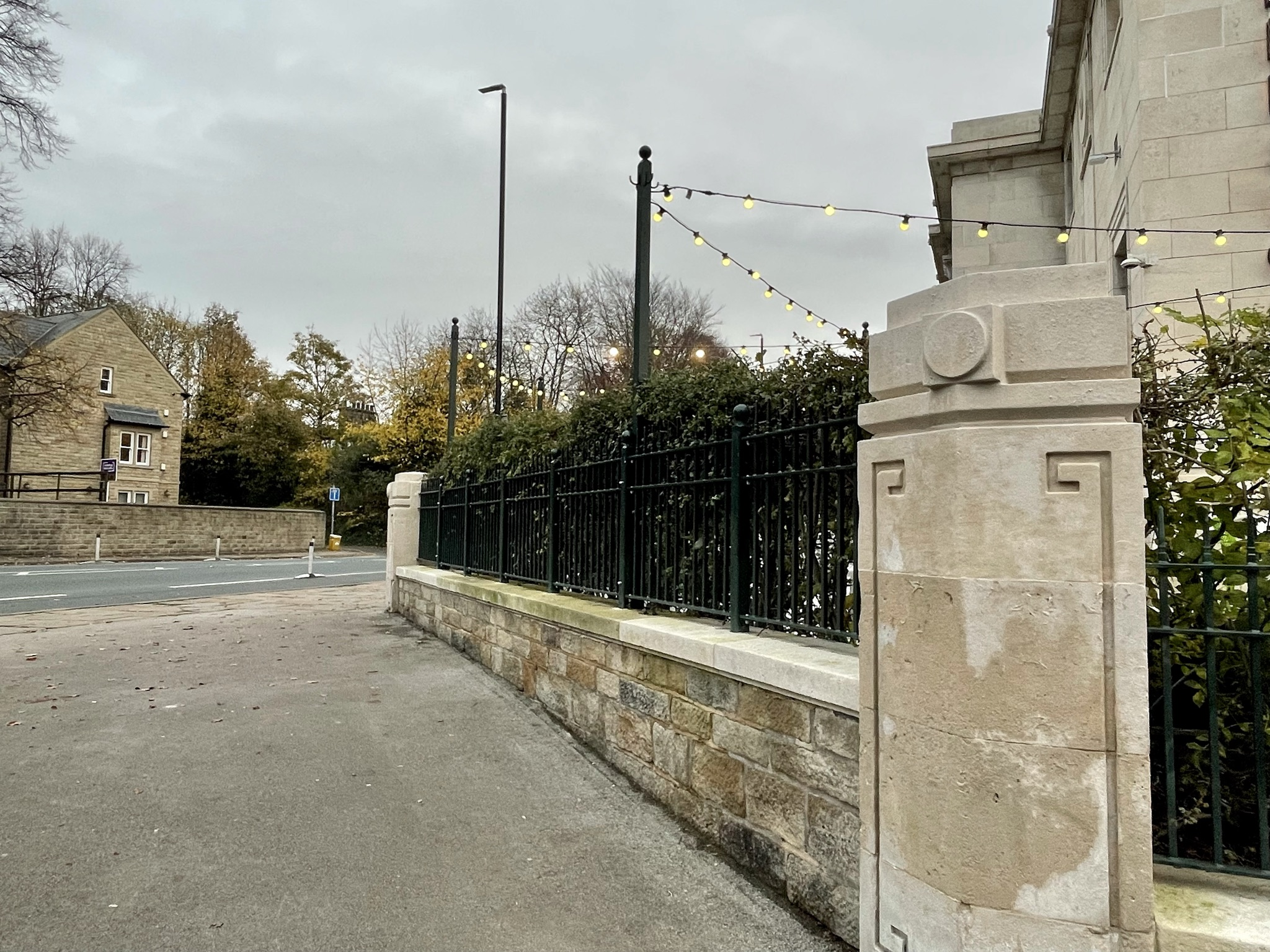
Boundary wall and gate pier with Greek patterns

== See also ==
- Egyptian Revival architecture in the British Isles
- Listed buildings in Leeds (Headingley Ward)
