= Leeds Girls' High School =

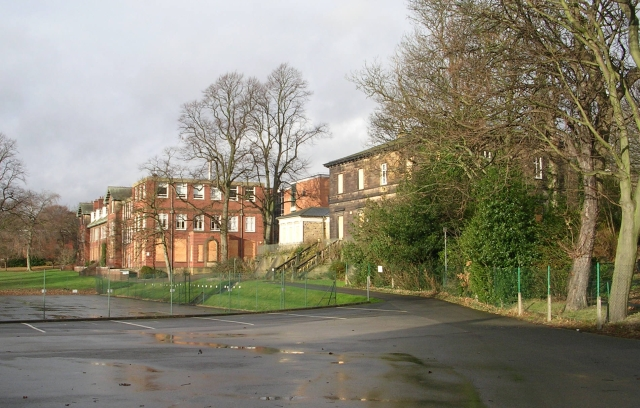
- School premises from Victoria Road (after closure)

Location
- Leeds, West Yorkshire; England
- Coordinates: 53.815825°N 1.566126°W

Information
- Type: Private
- Motto: Age Quod Agis "Do what you do"
- Established: 1876
- Closed: 2005 (merged to form the Grammar School at Leeds)
- Gender: Girls
- Age: 3 to 18

Leeds Girls' High School (LGHS) was an independent, selective, fee-paying school for girls aged 3–18 founded in 1876 in Headingley, Leeds, West Yorkshire, England. It merged with Leeds Grammar School in 2008 to form The Grammar School at Leeds.

== History ==
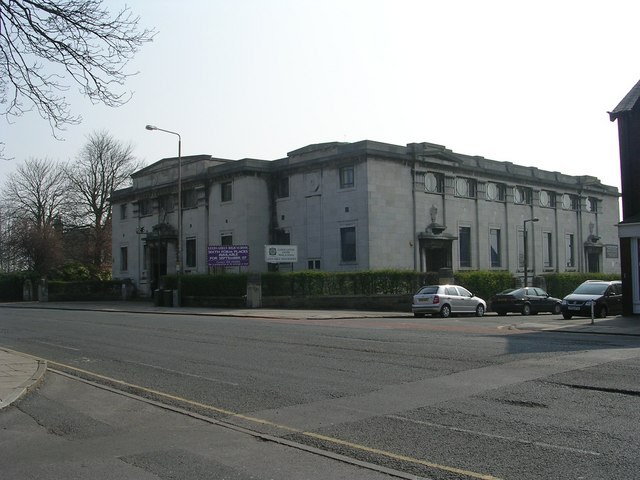
Elinor Lupton Centre

LGHS was founded in 1876, at a time when female education was limited but expanding. Frances Lupton and other members of the Ladies’ Honorary Council of the Yorkshire Board of Education decided that campaigning for access to the universities was of little use without better all-round education for girls, equivalent to what boys received at a traditional academic grammar school. Established interests prevented the use of existing charitable funds, so Lupton and her colleagues created a new way forward: a joint stock company.

The school motto was Age Quod Agis, which means "do what you do". While seemingly tautological at first glance, it is in fact a corruption of the Biblical exhortation, "whatsoever thy turn thy hand to, do it with all thy might". The pupils were divided into four houses, named after the four patron saints of the United Kingdom: Andrew, David, George and Patrick. Girls were placed into the houses that their families had been in before them. There were various house competitions throughout the year, mainly sports and arts orientated, the main one being the house music competition during the spring term.

From its earliest years, the school catered for female boarders.

Although initially only operating as a high school for girls age over 13, in time, the school would have three sections situated in the western suburbs of Headingley:

- Infant School (Rose Court): 3- to 7-year-olds
- Junior School (Ford House): 7- to 11-year-olds
- Senior School: 11- to 18-year-olds

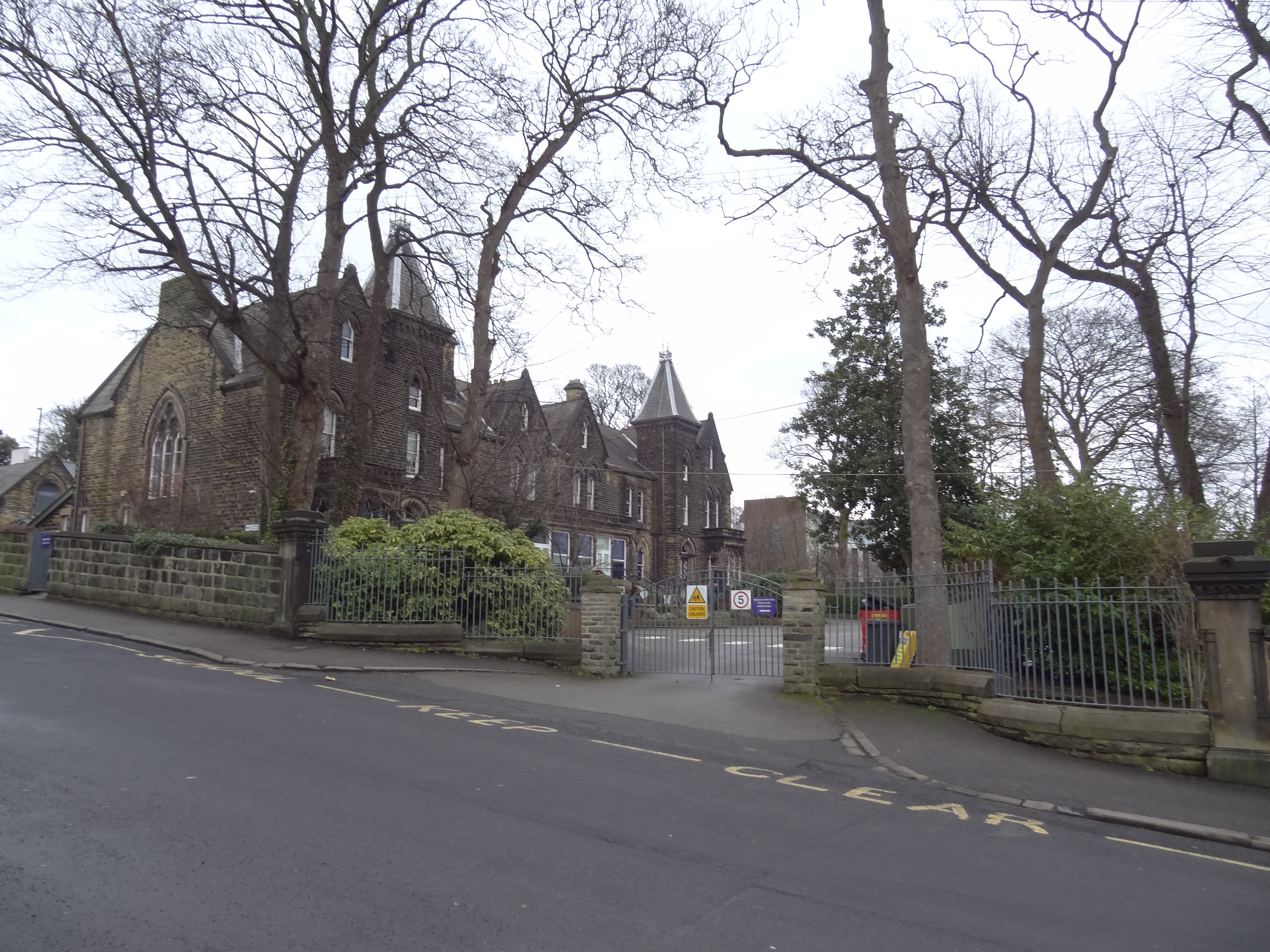
Ford House (Junior School)

=== Rose Court, the school's nursery ===
The Infant School (Rose Court) was situated on the large Senior School site on Headingley Lane. In 1899, "Rose Court" was owned by Miss Hannah Lambert (1830-1911) who was the inspiring genius of the Society for Care and Protection of Friendless Girls, the Leeds branch of which had been co-founded by LGHS's co-founder Frances Lupton in 1885. Lambert's home occasionally accommodated the school's nursery and was purchased in 1912 by the school after her death in 1911 when it formally became LGHS's Infant School.

=== Junior School ===
The Junior School (Ford House) operated 1 mile (1.6 km) down the road in Buckingham Road. Ford House was a pair of semi-detached houses with terrace steps built in the late 19th century.

=== Senior School ===
The Senior School building was built in the early 1900s, and efforts are currently being made to have the building listed. The fine oak wood panelling in the Assembly Hall detailed where Old Girls went to university on completion of their education at LGHS. The furniture within the Senior School Library was designed by Robert Thompson (The Mouseman), but was sold when the school moved to Alwoodley Gates (the Leeds Grammar School site).

In 2004 LGHS was the highest performing school within the Leeds LEA area, achieving top results at both GCSE and A Level.

== Merger with Leeds Grammar School ==
In 2005 LGHS merged with Leeds Grammar School to form the Grammar School at Leeds (GSAL). The merged school administration took over LGHS in August 2005, however the schools did not physically merge until September 2008. At that time the Junior School (ages 7–11) and Senior School (ages 11–18) moved to Alwoodley Gates. Classes for girls and boys between the ages of 11 and 16 remain segregated, but all extracurricular activities are mixed. The Infant School moved to the Ford House building next to a new nursery school, currently operating as GSAL'S Rose Court Nursery and Pre-Prep.

The school building was used as a filming location for the fictional St Matthews' Hospital in the new ITV medical drama Monroe, which was scheduled for broadcast in 2011.

== Headmistresses ==
- 1997–2007: Sue Fishburn
- 1977-1997: Philippa Randall
- 1970-1976: Audrey Jackson
- 1949-1970: Marilyn G. Sykes
- 1933–1949: Leslie P. Kirk
- 1905–1932: Lucy A. Lowe
- 1903-1905: E. T. Joseph
- 1892–1902: Helena Langhorne Powell
- 1876–1891: Catherine Lucy Kennedy

== Notable former pupils ==
- Laura Ashe – historian of medieval literature
- Judith Blake, Baroness Blake of Leeds – former Leader of Leeds City Council
- Lucy Frazer – UK government minister
- Catherine Hughes – former civil servant and Principal of Somerville College, Oxford
- Esther Killick – physiologist
- Mary Kitson Clark – archaeologist and independent scholar
- Sally Mackereth – architect
- Pauline Neville-Jones, Baroness Neville-Jones – former civil servant and UK government minister
- Valerie Pitts, Lady Solti – former BBC announcer and widow of musician Sir Georg Solti
- Marilyn Stowe – divorce lawyer and campaigner for family law reform

== See also ==
- Listed buildings in Leeds (Headingley Ward)
