= Stefania Bojda =

Polish artist and teacher

Stefania Bojda (born 1938, in Cieszyn) is a Polish artist and teacher.

She finished Liceum Pedagogiczne (pedagogical high school) in Cieszyn in 1965 and plastic arts at the University of Silesia in 1978. She worked as a teacher in Bielsko-Biała from 1965 to 1969 and later in Cieszyn.

She wrote and published, with her brother Józef Golec, Słownik biograficzny ziemi cieszyńskiej (vol. 1, 1993; vol. 2, 1995; vol. 3, 1998).
