= Lamargelle =

- Commune
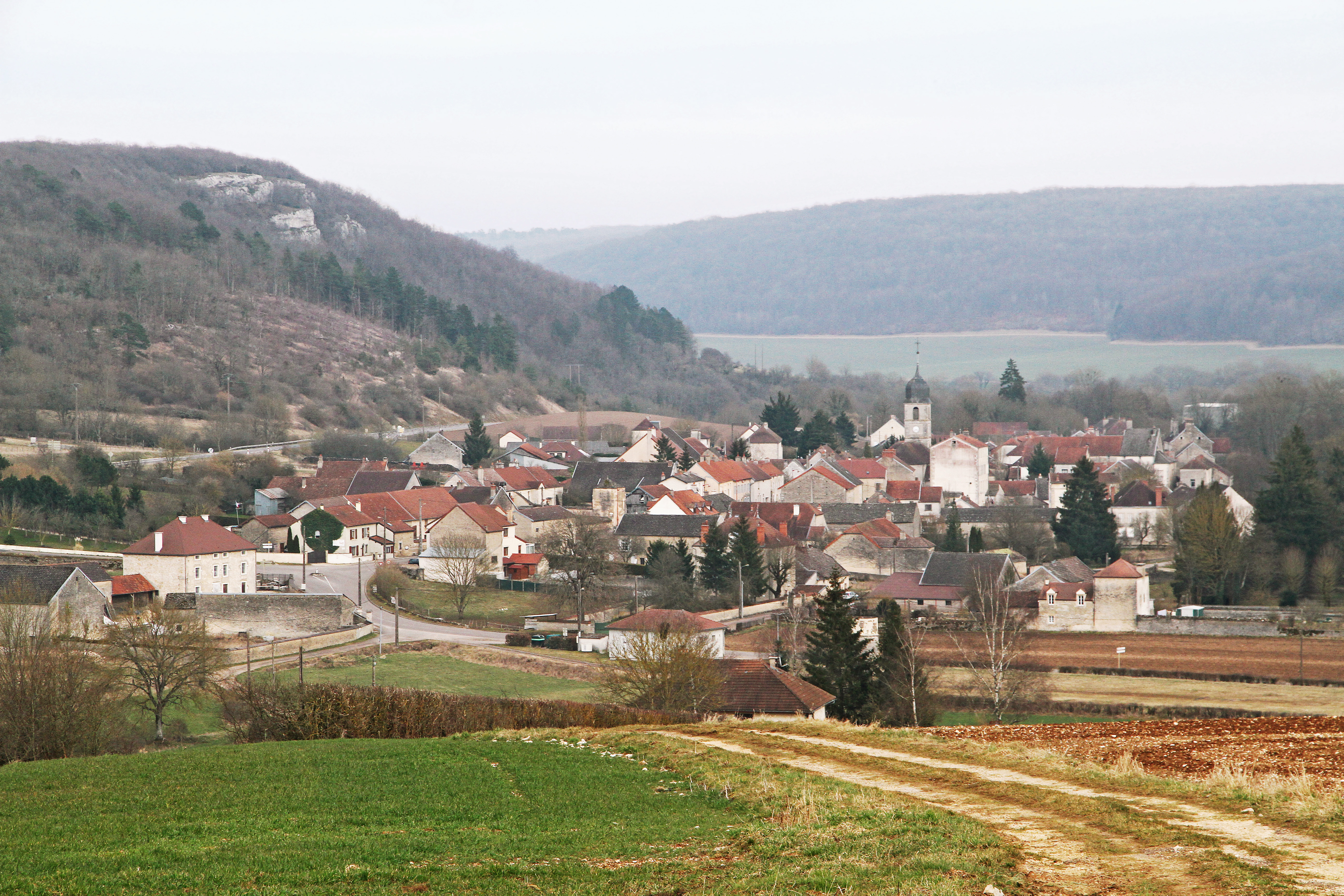
- A general view of Lamargelle
- Location of Lamargelle
- Location within France Location within Bourgogne-Franche-Comté
- Coordinates: 47°32′04″N 4°50′30″E
- Country: France
- Region: Bourgogne-Franche-Comté
- Department: Côte-d'Or
- Arrondissement: Dijon
- Canton: Is-sur-Tille

Government
  - Mayor (2021–2026): Gilles Saulgeot
- Area^{1}: 25.75 km^{2} (9.94 sq mi)
- Elevation: 350 m (1,150 ft)
- Highest elevation: 527 m (1,729 ft)
- Lowest elevation: 337 m (1,106 ft)
- Population (2023): 142
  - Density: 5.51/km^{2} (14.3/sq mi)
- Time zone: UTC+01:00 (CET)
  - Summer (DST): UTC+02:00 (CEST)
- INSEE/Postal code: 21338 /21440
- ^{1} French Land Register data, which excludes lakes, ponds, glaciers > 1 km^{2} (0.386 sq mi or 247 acres) and river estuaries.

Lamargelle (French pronunciation: [lamaʁʒɛl]) is a commune in the Côte-d'Or department in eastern France.

== Population ==
Historical population
| Year | Pop. | ±% p.a. |
|---|---|---|
| 1968 | 271 | — |
| 1975 | 215 | −3.25% |
| 1982 | 175 | −2.90% |
| 1990 | 161 | −1.04% |
| 1999 | 145 | −1.16% |
| 2007 | 167 | +1.78% |
| 2012 | 152 | −1.86% |
| 2017 | 158 | +0.78% |
| 2023 | 142 | −1.76% |
Source: INSEE

== See also ==
- Communes of the Côte-d'Or department
