= Charles Kaisin =

Belgian designer (born 1972)

- Born: 5 December 1972 (age 53)
- Occupation: Designer
- Website: charleskaisin.com

Charles Kaisin is a Belgian designer, architect and scenographer born on December 5, 1972. He designs objects, spaces and fashion shows, as well as Surrealist Dinners and Origami Installations. His projects include the Paris offices of the Louvre Abu Dhabi, Swatch, the Grand-Hornu site and Delvaux leather goods.

== Biography ==
Charles Kaisin was born on December 5, 1972, and grew up in the village of Devant-les-Bois in the Walloon region of Belgium.

In 1997, he interned in the studios of architect Jean Nouvel in Paris and sculptor Tony Cragg in Germany. These experiences led him to develop a style that blends technical innovation with creative daring.

After studying architecture at the Institut Supérieur d'Architecture Saint-Luc in Brussels, Charles Kaisin took part in an exchange program at Kyoto University of the Arts in 2000, where he discovered origami, an ancestral Japanese practice that combines precision, dexterity and the exploration of space. In 2001, he graduated from Ron Arad's class at the Royal College of Art in London, where he honed his skills in experimental design

Since 2005, he has been Professor of Design at the Faculty of Architecture, Architectural Engineering and Urban Planning (LOCI)

== Surrealist Dinner ==
Since 2012, Charles Kaisin has been organizing Surrealist Dinners, immersive events combining haute gastronomy, extravagant scenography and themes inspired by surrealism. Guests are invited to atypical venues: a subway train, a church or the Monte-Carlo casino. These locations serve as the backdrop for precise stagings in which every detail counts, right down to the dress of the waiters.

The idea for these surreal dinners came from personal experience. During his internship at Jean Nouvel's studio, Charles Kaisin stayed longer than expected with the Guerrand-Hermès family. To thank them, he organized a surreal dinner party. A soprano from the Opéra Royal de La Monnaie sang in a room featuring a tree surrounded by free-ranging birds, and each guest was served by a dedicated waiter. This unexpected setting became his signature. Since then, the concept has been constantly expanding. The themes and locations are kept secret until the day of the Dinner, and they change with each edition.

Several brands call on Charles Kaisin to organize Surrealist Dinners such as Rolls Royce (October 2016), Louis Roederer (241st Anniversary: October 2017), Casino de Monte-Carlo (L'Art du Jeu, le Jeu de l'Art avril : 2027, The game of love and chance : December 2017), Kanal - Centre Pompidou de Paris (Le songe en noir et blanc : 2018), Cartier (Les galaxies de Cartier: 2019 and 2022), Piaget (Piaget Golden Oasis: 2019), Hermès (Let's Play: November 2018, 2022), Veuve Cliquot (250th Anniversary: February 2022), Proximus (Proud to be Belgian: December 2022), Meurice (Metamorphosis: March 2023), Benetti (150th Anniversary: June 2023), Brafa (January 2024),...

== Origami installations ==
It was during his studies in Kyoto that Charles Kaisin developed his fascination for folding. The practice of origami plays a central role in his work.

His installations are composed of thousands of origami pieces assembled with artisanal precision to form complex 3D structures. The folds come to life as sculptural elements, such as animals like doves, and can be seen as aerial suspensions, geometric walls or immersive backdrops.

In 2020, during the COVID-19 pandemic, he launched the participatory Origami for Life project, inviting the public to make origami. Each bird made by the public gave rise to a donation of 5 euros to the Erasme Foundation in Brussels to support medical research. More than 20,000 folds were collected, forming an installation 5m high and 16m long exhibited at the Kanal-Centre Pompidou in Brussels.

== Work ==
In his work on recycling, Kaisin transforms an empty bottle in a glass, he diverts the porthole of a washing machine in a bowl, designs furniture with newspaper material, creates clothes and bags from plastic shopping bags, so many topics to bring a different perspective on life and death of objects.

Kaisin found the inspiration for his K-bench in his Japanese experience. The honeycomb structure of this extensible bench revolutionizes many misconceptions in design but also in the use of materials. The K-bench can take many forms and be placed both inside and outside. Charles also made a newspaper version of the K-Bench.

For Royal Boch, Kaisin creates reversible trays and plates, where the movement is bound to the function to initiate another way to share the art of the table.

He also designed the inside wing of MACs (Museum of Contemporary Art in Grand-Hornu, Belgium), chocolates for Pierre Marcolini and created a bag for Delvaux.

== Architecture ==
Charles Kaisin is known for a variety of creative projects, including interior design projects, installations and product design but also architecture in general.

The "Almaha Marrakech Riad" is located in the oldest district of Marrakech, the Kasbash, where the royal stables were once located. This new Riad, with 12 individually styled rooms, was designed by Kaisin.

In 2015, he also designed the interior of Kilikio Paris, a Mediterranean boutique where Greek influences come to life through a pixel wall installation depicting a Greek landscape.

== Exhibition ==
- Grand Palais (Paris) : exhibition of hairy chair
- Mudam (Museum for Modern Art, Luxembourg): K-Bench
- Carrousel du Louvre (Paris) : Newspaper Bench
- Kyoto Art Center : recycled paper chair
- Internationales Design Zentrum Berlin : Retrospective
- Museum for Contemporary Arts, Grand-Hornu, Belgium : Retrospective
