= Antoni Osuchowski =

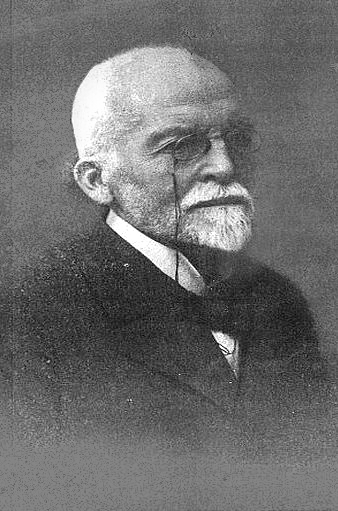
- Antoni Osuchowski
- Born: 13 June 1849; Paris, France
- Died: 9 January 1928 (aged 78); Warsaw, Poland
- Resting place: Powązki Cemetery
- Occupations: Lawyer, philanthropist, national activist

Antoni Osuchowski (13 June 1849 in Paris – 9 January 1928 in Warsaw) was a Polish lawyer, publicist, philanthropist and national activist in Silesia, Warmia and Mazury.

His father Hieronim emigrated to France after the November Uprising. Antoni Osuchowski graduated from elementary school in Paris, and from high school (gymnasium) in Warsaw. After graduation, he studied law and administration at the university in Warsaw in 1866–1870. In 1876 Osuchowski became advocate in a district court in Warsaw.

In 1914 he abandoned his job and focused on collecting funds for educational and cultural purposes for Poles living abroad. In 1921 he founded the Adam Mickiewicz Society for Protection of the Cultural Interests of Poles Resident Abroad together with Antoni Ponikowski and Wojciech Trąmpczyński. When World War I broke out he founded Central Polish Relief Committee with Henryk Sienkiewicz and Ignacy Paderewski, in Switzerland. Its purpose was financial aid to the Polish population. In November 1918 from his initiative the Warszawski Komitet Obrony Lwowa (Warsaw Committee for Lwów Defense) was created. Its purpose was financial aid, it also advocated the military relief of the city. Osuchowski organized material help for Polish education and press in Cieszyn Silesia, Warmia and Mazury, and in 1920 for Polish plebiscite workers.

He died in Warsaw and is buried at Powązki Cemetery.
