= Solesmes, Nord =

Solesmes
- Commune
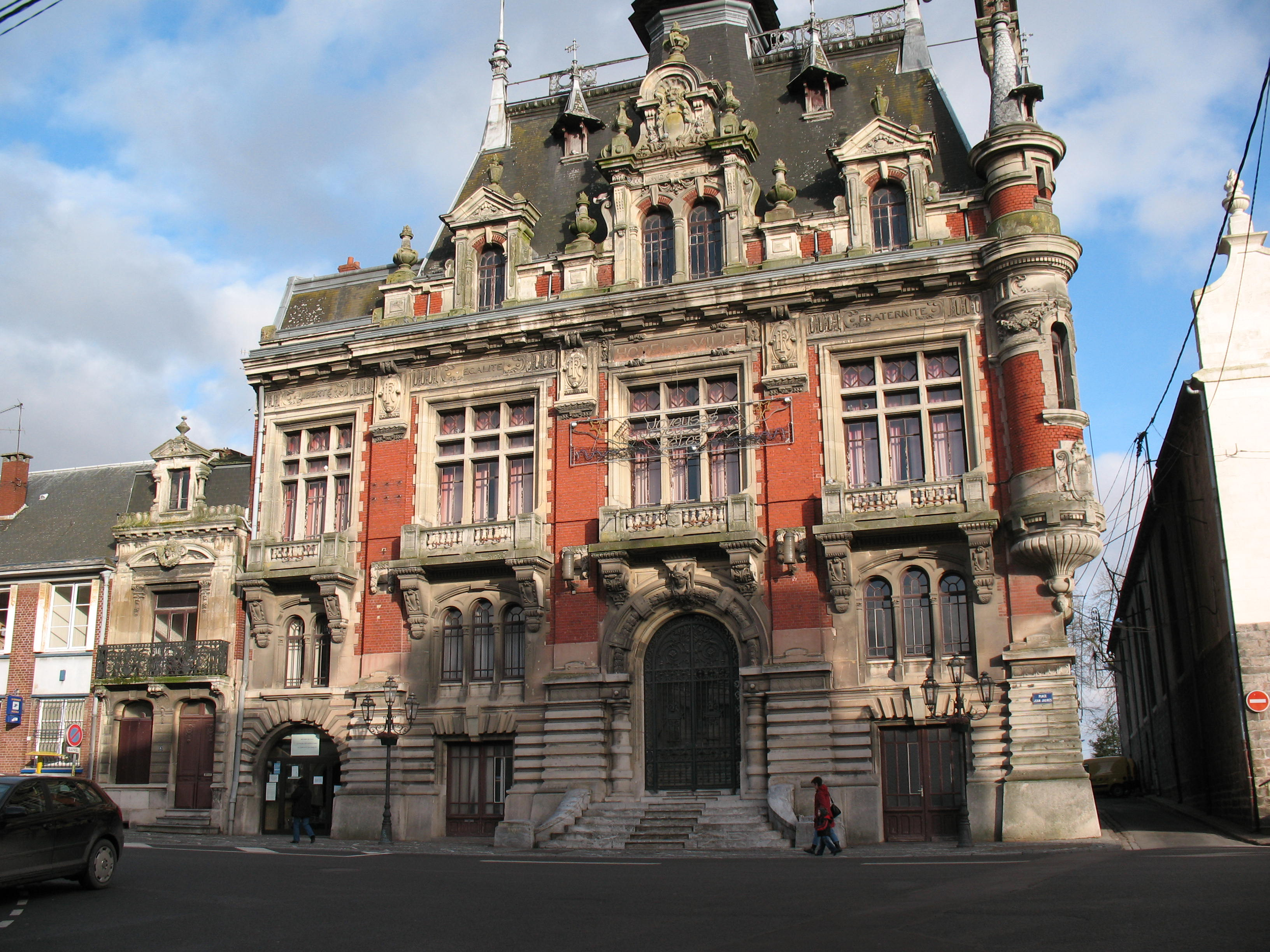
- The town hall in Solesmes

- Coat of arms
- Location of Solesmes
- Location within France Location within Hauts-de-France
- Coordinates: 50°11′10″N 3°29′57″E
- Country: France
- Region: Hauts-de-France
- Department: Nord
- Arrondissement: Cambrai
- Canton: Caudry
- Intercommunality: CC Pays Solesmois

Government
  - Mayor (2020–2026): Paul Sagniez
- Area^{1}: 23.25 km^{2} (8.98 sq mi)
- Elevation: 70 m (230 ft)
- Highest elevation: 139 m (456 ft)
- Lowest elevation: 62 m (203 ft)
- Population (2023): 4,142
  - Density: 178.2/km^{2} (461.4/sq mi)
- Time zone: UTC+01:00 (CET)
  - Summer (DST): UTC+02:00 (CEST)
- INSEE/Postal code: 59571 /59730
- ^{1} French Land Register data, which excludes lakes, ponds, glaciers > 1 km^{2} (0.386 sq mi or 247 acres) and river estuaries.

Solesmes (French pronunciation: [sɔlɛm]; Picard: Solinmes) is a commune in the Nord department in northern France.

== Population ==
Historical population
Year	Pop.	±% p.a.
1968	6,042	—
1975	5,740	−0.73%
1982	5,328	−1.06%
1990	4,892	−1.06%
1999	4,767	−0.29%
2007	4,604	−0.43%
2012	4,505	−0.43%
2017	4,338	−0.75%
2023	4,142	−0.77%
Source: INSEE

== Heraldry ==
Arms of Solesmes	The arms of Solesmes are blazoned : Sable, 3 crescents argent.

== Education ==
The city is home to:

- the École Saint-Joseph.
- the 'Institution Saint Michel: Collège and Lycée', a Catholic Secondary School with boarding facilities.
- the Collège Saint Exupéry.

== Notable person ==
- The mathematician Gustave Choquet (1915–2006) was born in Solesmes

== See also ==
- Communes of the Nord department
