= Neurosciences Institute (disambiguation) =

The Neurosciences Institute is a former American nonprofit scientific research organization.

Neurosciences Institute or Neuroscience Institute may also refer to:

- Helen Wills Neuroscience Institute at the University of California, Berkeley, U.S.
- Luria Neuroscience Institute in New York City, U.S.
- National Neuroscience Institute, Singapore
- Bangur Institute of Neurosciences, Bhawanipur, Kolkata, West Bengal, India
- Princeton Neuroscience Institute, at Princeton University, New Jersey, U.S.
- Netherlands Institute for Neuroscience
- Texas Neurosciences Institute, U.S.
- Mischer Neuroscience Institute, Texas, U.S.
- International Institute for Neuroscience of Natal
- National Institute of Neuroscience, Dhaka, Bangladesh
- Hoag Neurosciences Institute, Orange County, California, U.S.
