= Biederstaedt Grocery =

- U.S. National Register of Historic Places
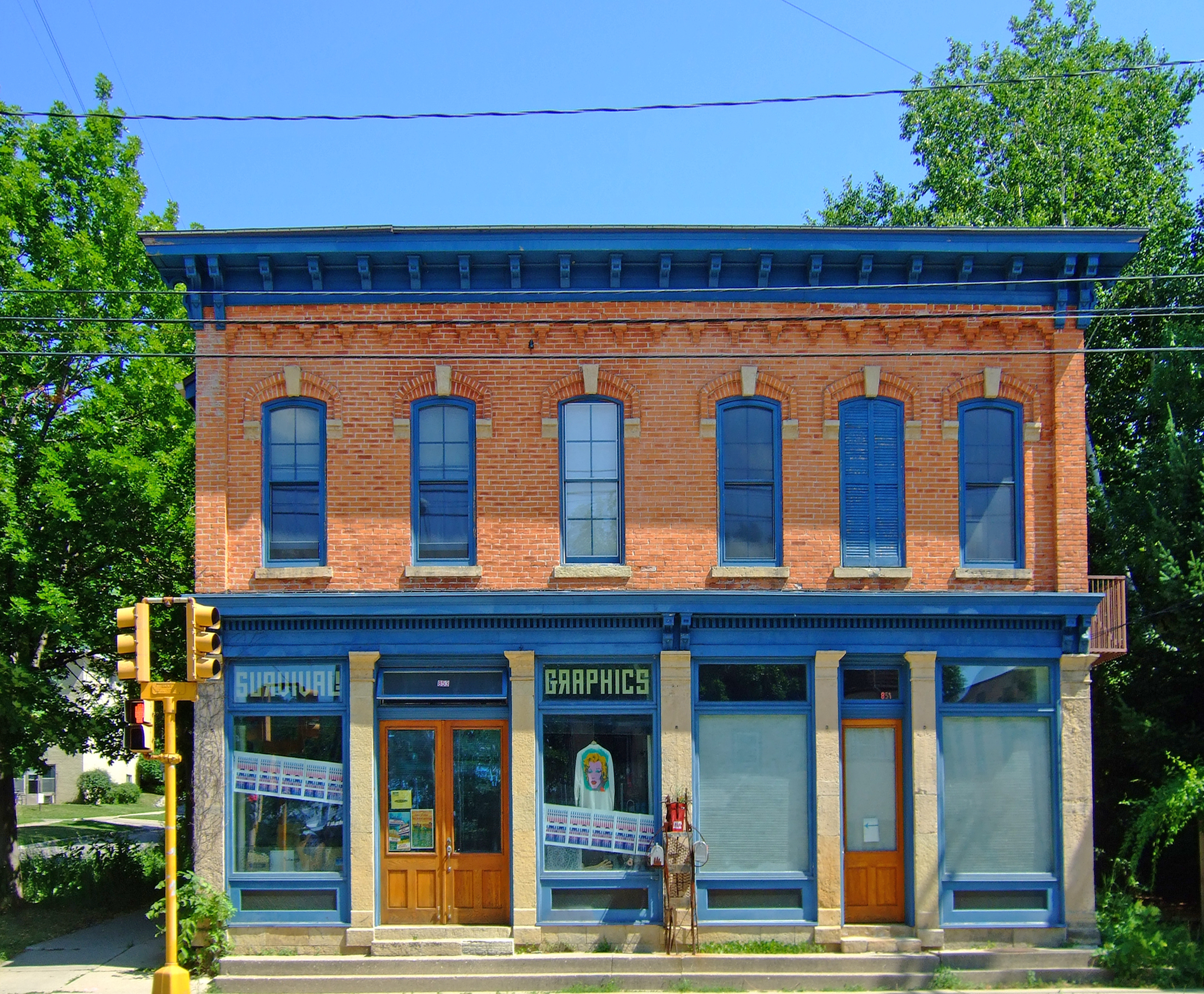
- Biederstaedt Grocery
- Location: 851-853 Williamson St. Madison, Wisconsin
- Coordinates: 43.07925°N 89.36968°W
- Built: 1874
- Architectural style: Italianate
- NRHP reference No.: 82000647
- Added to NRHP: March 25, 1982

The Biederstatedt Grocery, later Breitenbach Grocery, was built in 1874 in Madison, Wisconsin as a corner grocery store. It is the best-preserved survivor of the corner groceries that once dotted Madison. In 1982 it was added to the National Register of Historic Places.

== History ==
In the late 1850s, Otto Hinrichs built a small wooden store on this site at the corner of Williamson and Patterson streets, nine blocks east of the capitol. Hinrichs sold dry goods and groceries from the store until 1866, when he sold the store to Charles F. Biederstaedt. Biederstaedt continued the business until 1874 when he leased the building to Martin Joachim, but then the building was destroyed by a fire that broke out in Hyer's Hotel next door.

After the fire, Biederstaedt built a bigger store on the same corner, two stories in hard-to-burn brick with sandstone trim, with the exterior very much as it stands today. At street-level, stone pilasters separate the shop windows, and support a bracketed cornice. Above that the walls are brick, with hood moulds with keystones over the six windows. Above them a line of decorative brick corbelling leads to a brick parapet which hides a shallow gable roof behind. The parapet is topped with a bracketed wood cornice. The overall style is Italianate, which was popular in the 1870s. Biederstaedt ran a grocery store out of the 853 side of the building and a saloon in the 851 side, and his family lived upstairs.

George C. Breitenbach immigrated from Bavaria to the U.S. in 1846, moving with his family to Madison in 1850. When he was seven they settled on Williamson Street near the store. He worked as a wagonmaker and plowmaker, but when Charles Biederstaedt died in 1890, Breitenbach leased the store from the Biederstaedt family, and bought it in 1898 or 1899. The Biederstaedts moved to a house nearby and the Breitenbachs moved in above the store and saloon. The family lived there and ran the grocery store for over sixty years, until 1951.

In 1949 an old-timer recalled the Breitenbach years:

Williamson Street in the old days was a very important thoroughfare. It is yet for that matter. But I can well remember the time when it was by far the best (and under certain weather conditions, the only) street that tapped the rich farming country to the east and even the northeast of Madison. And Breitenbach's corner, as it came to be called, was the busiest spot on the street. The hitching posts and curb rings always tethered a full quota of farm wagons or bob sleds. In the winter the street was a heaven for us neighboring kids who spent our Saturdays "hitching bobs." ... The candy counter in the store was a popular place, too, for us youngsters. George Breitenbach was very fond of children and he had a free and open handed disposition. He always gave us double value for our nickels and pennies and as often as not refused to take our money. I am afraid we often took advantage of his generosity.

The building now serves as a specialty store, with a ghost sign for King Midas Flour still on the side. Along with the NRHP listing, the building was designated a landmark by the Madison Landmarks Commission in 1977.

In the late 1800s, small neighborhood grocery stores were scattered all around Madison. Along with bars and other local stores, they served as informal community centers where neighbors met. As people got cars and access to larger stores, the corner stores dwindled. A 1977 survey found only nine corner grocery stores from the 1800s left in Madison, and of them Biederstaedt-Breitenbach was the most intact, and the best surviving example.
