= Lviv in Polish =

Guidebook

House Names and Other Inscriptions
- Author: Kseniya Borodin, Ivanna Honak
- Language: Ukrainian, Polish
- Series: Lviv in Polish
- Genre: Guidebook
- Publication date: 2012
- Publication place: Ukraine
- Media type: Print (paperback)
- Pages: 98 pp

Everyday Urban Life
- Author: Kseniya Borodin, Ivanna Honak
- Language: Ukrainian, Polish
- Series: Lviv in Polish
- Genre: Guidebook
- Publication date: 2013
- Publication place: Ukraine
- Media type: Print (paperback)
- Pages: 128 pp

Lviv in Polish (Polish: Lwów po polsku, Ukrainian: Львів по-польськи) is a series of guidebooks by Kseniya Borodin and Ivanna Honak, devoted to Polish ghost signs in the city of Lviv, Ukraine. It explores the history of the city through a variety of different types of publicly accessible signs and inscriptions, illustrated with over 300 original photographs. The series was originally written in Ukrainian and has been translated into Polish.

Lviv (Polish: Lwów) was part of Polish territory until 1946, when it was ceded to Ukrainian SSR of the Soviet Union in the aftermath of the Second World War. The vast majority of its Polish population was expelled from the city in post-war population transfers.

There are six books in the series, including:

- House Names and Other Inscriptions analyses over two hundred domestic inscriptions, including the names of houses and villas, signatures of architects and sculptors, pre-Soviet house numbers and plaques (ISBN 978-617-642-058-3).
- Everyday Urban Life depicts ghost signs surviving on former schools, banks, factories, shops, hotels and other institutions (ISBN 978-617-642-113-9).
- Seals of Quality covers manufacturer's marks from producers of tiles, marble, stained glass windows, cast iron fences and manhole covers (ISBN 978-617-642-214-3).
