= LNF (disambiguation) =

LNF may refer to:

- LNF, a vehicle engine model
- Laboratori Nazionali di Frascati, a nuclear physics research institute in Frascati, Italy
- Lassen National Forest, a United States national forest
- Leon's, the TSX code LNF
- Liga Nacional de Futsal, the premier futsal league in Brazil
- Liga Nacional de Fútbol de Puerto Rico, the first division association football league of Puerto Rico
- Luria Scientific Foundation, an organization focused on cognitive neuroscience and neuropsychology
- Liga Nacional de Fútbol de Cuba, first division of association football of Cuba

== See also ==
- LAF (disambiguation)
