= LAF =

LAF may refer to:

- "L.A.F" (song)
- Laf (crater), on Mars
- Lafayette, Indiana (Amtrak station), United States; Amtrak station code LAF
- Lafayette College, a liberal arts college located in Easton, Pennsylvania
- Lance Armstrong Foundation
- Lean air-fuel
- Lebanese Air Force
- Lebanese Armed Forces
- Leeds Art Fund
- Lithuanian Activist Front
- Liquidity adjustment facility
- Purdue University Airport, Indiana, United States, by IATA airport code
- Latvian Air Force, by ICAO code
- Luftseilbahn Adliswil-Felsenegg, a cable car in Adliswil, Switzerland
- Look and feel, a computer related term
- League of American Football in Russia

== See also ==
- LNF (disambiguation)
