= Frank Harris Fulford =

Frank Harris Fulford was an entrepreneur, art collector and businessman. Born in Canada in 1868, Fulford was educated in Leipzig then he returned to Brockville, a city in Eastern Ontario, where he worked as a dealer in music. He married sometime before 1902 and had three children. An older brother to Charles Edward Fulford, he moved to Leeds, in England, during 1902 to manage the British division of Charles's manufacturing business, C. E. Fulford Limited. The company produced patent medicines, manufacturing products including Bile Beans and Zam-Buk ointment, and was first established in the UK in 1899 after achieving success in Australia. The company undertook an unsuccessful court action, and a later appeal, against an Edinburgh pharmacist in 1905 but it continued to trade and prosper despite the judge opining that the business was "founded on, and conducted by fraud". A year later after the sudden death of his wealthy brother, Charles, Fulford took up the reins of the family business. (Note: Charles Fulford died in 1906, aged 36 years, leaving an estate valued at £1.3 million, around £176,623,322 today.) He purchased Headingley Castle, Leeds, in 1909 and it became the family's main residence.

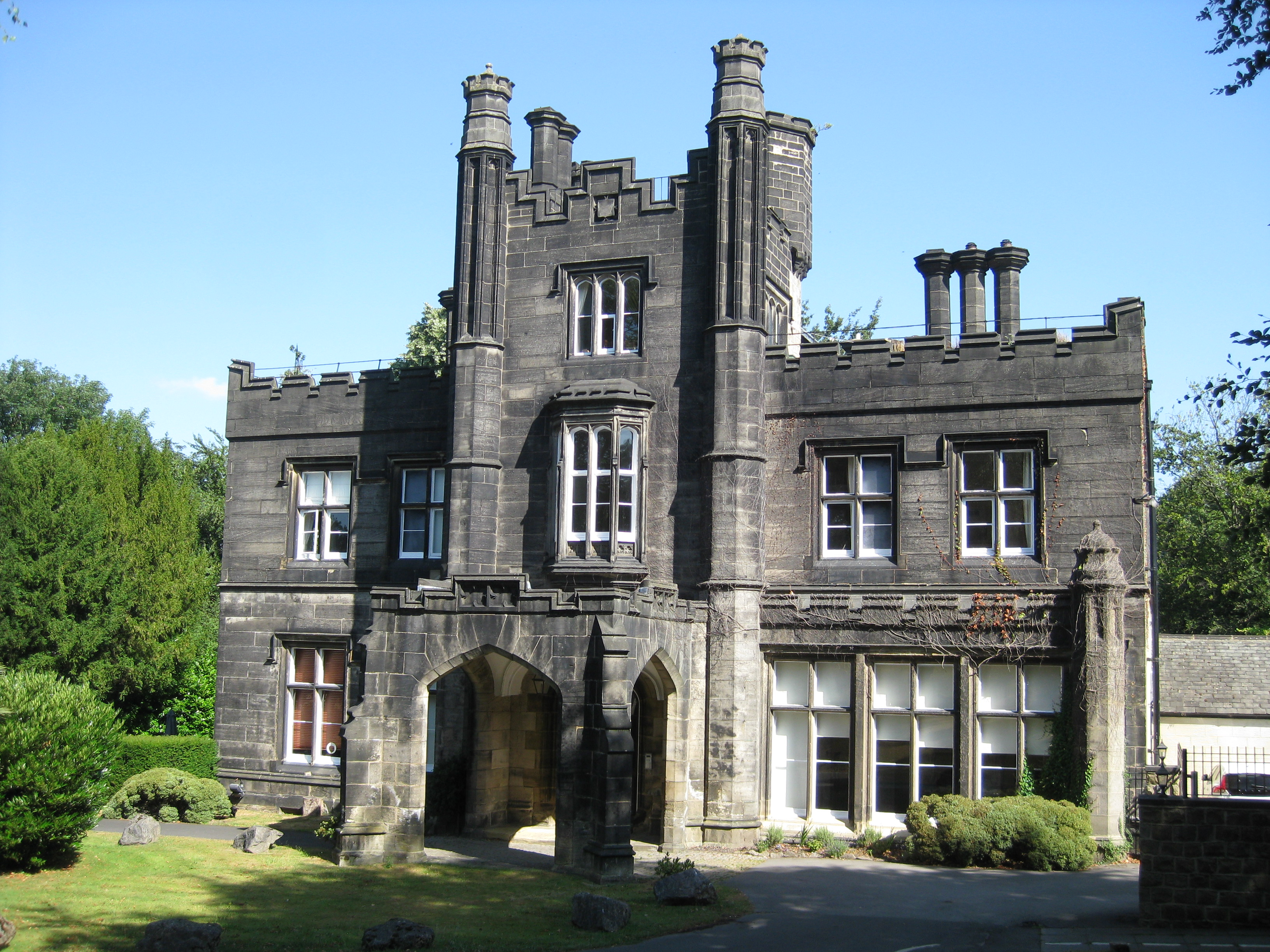
Headingley Castle - his home and place of death

A love of music remained a constant factor in Fulford's life; he had been a skilled viola player from a young age and he composed the music for the Bile Bean March, part of the marketing campaign of the company, in 1898. While studying in Leipzig he began collecting modern and classical chamber music from all over the world; the collection was donated to the library at Leeds University in 1936 after ill health meant he was unable to play instruments.

A founder member of Leeds Art Collections Fund, Fulford was also a collector of Chinese jade and other objet d'art. He donated several items to be displayed in the Blue Drawing Room at the Temple Newsam museum in 1939.

Fulford died at Headingley Castle, Leeds, in August 1943. His wife, Lily, and a daughter, Frances, survived him; his estate amounted to more than £198,000. (Note: £11,015,493 today.) A son, Jack, predeceased him in 1940.
