= Elkhonon Goldberg =

American neuropsychologist

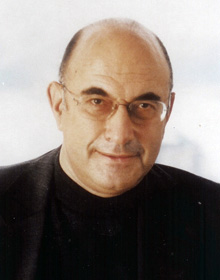
- Elkhonon Goldberg, Neuropsychologist and Cognitive Neuroscientist.
- Born: 1946 (age 79–80); Riga
- Education: Moscow State University
- Scientific career
- Fields: Neuropsychology

Elkhonon Goldberg (born 1946) is a neuropsychologist and cognitive neuroscientist known for his work in hemispheric specialization and the "novelty-routinization" theory.

== Biography ==
Goldberg studied at Moscow State University with neuropsychologist Alexander Luria, who is often credited as a father of modern neuropsychology, and moved to the United States in 1974. He is currently a Clinical Professor of Neurology at New York University School of Medicine, Diplomate of The American Board of Professional Psychology in Clinical Neuropsychology, and Co-Founder and Chief Scientific Advisor of SharpBrains, an online brain fitness center. He offers post-doctoral training in Neuropsychology at Fielding Graduate University. Elkhonon Goldberg is the Founding Director of Luria Neuroscience Institute (LNI), an organization founded with the purpose of advancing research and disseminating knowledge about the brain and the mind. He describes himself as an atheist "with agnostic tendencies".

== Scientific work ==
At Moscow State University, Goldberg studied psychology and mathematics and was among the early proponents of the discipline known today as computational neuroscience. In the United States Goldberg's work has been more clinical in nature. His research has focused on the function of the frontal lobes, hemispheric specialization, memory, cognitive aging, and general theory of functional cortical organization.

Among the early critics of the fashionable notion of neocortical modularity, he introduced the notion of "cognitive gradient" to capture the distributed and emergent properties of functional cortical organization.

Goldberg's work on frontal lobe functions includes the discovery of the "reticulo-frontal disconnection" syndrome, functional lateralization and gender differences in the prefrontal cortex. His work on memory includes the description of relatively pure retrograde amnesia without anterograde amnesia, which in turn has led to the elucidation of the role of brain stem arousal mechanisms in memory.

Goldberg's more recent scientific interests focused on cross-cultural neuroscience and neurobiologically inspired AI.

In clinical practice, Goldberg was among the early proponents of "cognitive fitness," purporting to harness the effects of lifelong neuroplasticity to delay and even reverse the effects of cognitive aging. First introduced by Michael Merzenich, the concept has gained the support of a number of leading neuroscientists. Nonetheless, it remains controversial and further research is required to validate it.

Goldberg is an author of a number of scientific journal articles and book chapters, as well as several books: Contemporary Neuropsychology and the Legacy of Luria; The Executive Brain: Frontal Lobes and the Civilized Mind; The Wisdom Paradox: How Your Mind Can Grow Stronger As Your Brain Grows Older; The New Executive Brain: Frontal Lobes in a Complex World; Creativity: The Human Brain in the Age of Innovation; and Executive Functions in Health and Disease.

=== Novelty-routinization theory ===
His work on hemispheric specialization culminated in the "novelty-routinization" theory positing that (for the predominantly right-handed population) the two cerebral hemispheres are differentially involved in processing novel, unknown information (the right hemisphere) and processing in terms of stable pattern-recognition devices for known situations of mental routine (the left hemisphere). As for left-handers and ambidextrals, Goldberg indicates that the two hemispheres are less differentiated in function and structure. For these individuals there may be instances in which the left hemisphere takes the role of novelty processing and the right the routine processing.

Specifically, the right hemisphere favors the "heteromodal association cortex" while the left favors the "modality-specific association cortex", and both are engaged in complex information processing. The latter deals solely with processing information arriving from individual sensory systems, such as visual, auditory, and sensory ones. This kind of cortex, favoring more local connections between adjacent cortical regions, "dismantles the world around us to separate representations. ... think of an object in a three-dimensional space projected onto the x, y, z coordinates...". On the other hand, the heteromodal association cortex, favoring distant inter-cortical connections, integrates information arriving from sensory channels, or puts "the synthetic picture of the multimedia world around us back together." Goldberg likens these differences in connectivity thus: the left hemisphere is like a fleet of taxicabs that traverses short town-like distances while the right is like a fleet of airplanes that traverses large continental distances.

The novelty-routinization theory incorporates the more traditional distinction between verbal and nonverbal functions as a special case, but is more dynamic in nature, allows for evolutionary continuities, and provides a neurodevelopmental framework.

== Books ==
- Elkhonon Goldberg. Contemporary Neuropsychology and the Legacy of Luria, Hillsdale, NJ: Lawrence Erlbaum, 1990. ISBN 978-0-8058-0334-1
- Elkhonon Goldberg. The Executive Brain: Frontal Lobes and the Civilized Mind, NY: Oxford University Press, 2001; paperback 2002. ISBN 978-0-19-515630-0
- Elkhonon Goldberg. The Wisdom Paradox: How Your Mind Can Grow Stronger As Your Brain Grows Older, NY: Penguin, 2005; paperback 2006. UK edition: Free Press, Simon & Schuster, 2005. ISBN 1-59240-187-2
- Elkhonon Goldberg. The New Executive Brain: Frontal Lobes in a Complex World, NY: Oxford University Press, 2009. ISBN 978-0-19-532940-7
- Elkhonon Goldberg. Executive Functions in Health and Disease, Academic Press; 1 edition; July 12, 2017. ISBN 978-0128036761
- Elkhonon Goldberg. Creativity: The Human Brain in the Age of Innovation, NY: Oxford University Press, 2018. ISBN 978-0-19-046649-7

== See also ==
- Brain fitness
- Alexander Luria
