= Leeds Art Fund =

The Leeds Art Fund (LAF), formerly the Leeds Art Collections Fund (LACF) is one of Britain's oldest supporting art gallery "friends" organisations. It was founded in Leeds on 11 November 1912 by Frank Rutter, who was the newly appointed curator of Leeds Art Gallery (then Leeds City Art Gallery) at the time, with the support of the Vice-Chancellor of the University of Leeds, Michael Sadler. The LACF was established to encourage the visual arts in Leeds and, most importantly, to provide a source of funding that was independent of the municipality for the purchase of contemporary and historic works of art and design for the people of Leeds. Other founding members and sponsors included Sydney Kitson (1871–1937), a well-known local architect and collector, and Frank Harris Fulford, director of the family firm C. E. Fulford Limited, which manufactured Bile Beans.

Today, most of the LAF's work is channelled through the Leeds City Art Galleries. Through subscriptions and fund-raising events the LAF has helped to enrich the visual life of Leeds by making purchases of art works for display in Leeds at the Leeds City Art Gallery, Temple Newsam House and Lotherton Hall. The LAF has, since its inception, purchased art works, often buying art works outright as part of the LAF collection, but also by supporting the purchase of art works through a contribution to the full purchase price. The LACF has also been the recipient of many generous bequests and donations of art works over the years. The art works belonging to the LAF are too numerous to mention in full, but include works by Henry Moore, Barbara Hepworth, Walter Sickert, Pierre Auguste Renoir, Patrick Heron, Alexander Calder, Francis Bacon, Andy Warhol, Stanley Spencer, Terry Frost and Thomas Hearne.

The LAF has also contributed towards the acquisition of many artworks on display in Leeds Museums and Galleries, including by such well-known names as Thomas Chippendale, J. M. W. Turner, John Sell Cotman, John Atkinson Grimshaw, Stass Paraskos, Paula Rego, Bridget Riley, Grayson Perry and Auguste Rodin.

The LAF has also supported various educational and publishing activities associated with the visual arts in Leeds, and continues to do so, not only at the Leeds City Art Galleries, but other visual art centres in Leeds, including the University of Leeds Art Gallery and East Street Arts (Vitrine project).

The LAF is an independent registered charity (Registered Charity Number 529300), but it maintains close links with Leeds City Council, and with other organisations with an interest in the artistic life of Leeds, including the University of Leeds, East Street Arts, the Leeds Philosophical and Literary Society and local businesses.

== Office holders ==
Since its foundation the Fund has had an almost unbroken series of certain Office Holders.

=== Patroness ===
- The Princess Royal, Countess of Harewood: 1949–1960

=== President ===
- Edward Wood, later 1st Earl of Halifax: 1912–1959
- The Princess Royal, Countess of Harewood: 1960–1965
- Charles Wood, 2nd Earl of Halifax: 1965–1980
- Miles Fitzalan-Howard, 17th Duke of Norfolk: 1980–1986
- Lord Martin Fitzalan-Howard: 1986–1996
- Peter Wood, 3rd Earl of Halifax: 1996–present

=== Hon. Secretary ===
- Frank Rutter: 1912–1917
- Solomon Kaines-Smith: 1924–1927
- Frank Lambert: 1927–1931
- John Rothenstien: 1932–1934
- Philip Hendy: 1934–1945
- Ernest Musgrave: 1946–1957
- Robert Rowe: 1958–1983
- Christopher Gilbert: 1984–1994
- Evelyn Silber: 1995–2001
- Nick Winterbotham: 2001–2004
- John Roles: 2004–

=== Hon. Treasurer ===
- A.J. Sanders: 1912–1922
- H.M. Hepworth: 1922–1942
- E.M. Arnold: 1944–1954
- Martin Arnold: 1955–1992
- J.S. Fox: 1992–1997
- Liam O'Connor: 1997–2000
- James Beer: 2000–2001
- Carole Fletcher: 2001–2010
- Tony Mills: 2010–2015
- Anne Braithwaite: 2015–

=== Chair ===
- Michael Sadler: 1912–1924
- James Baillie: 1924–unknown (died 1940)
- -
- George Black: 1969–1986
- Tony Brown: 1986–1997
- J.S. Fox: 1997–2003
- Benedict Read: 2003–2012
- James Lomax: 2012–2015
- Mark Westgarth: 2015–
