= Headingley Castle =

Former house in Leeds, England

Coordinates: 53°49′11″N 1°34′24″W

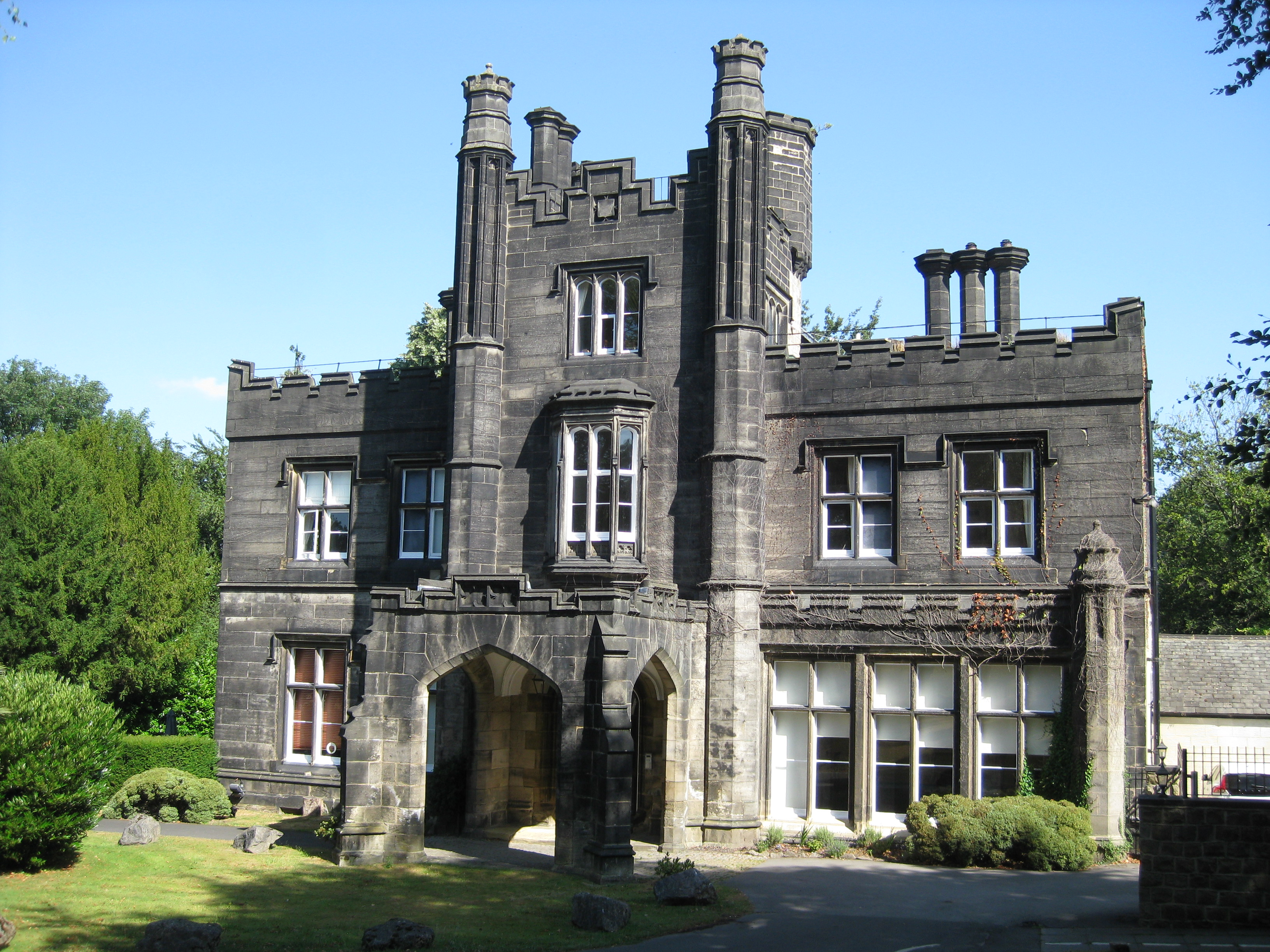
Front view

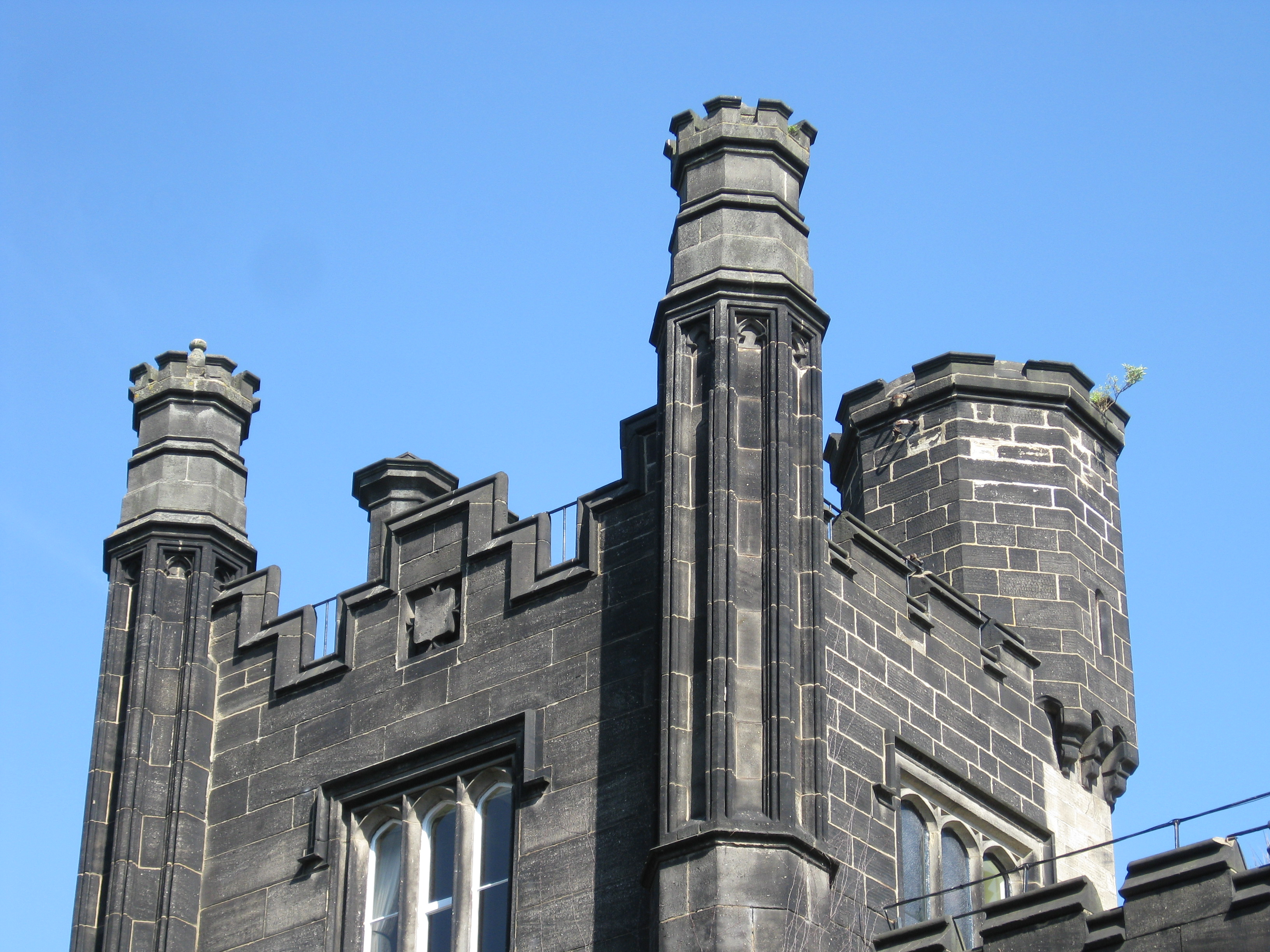
Details of turrets and battlements

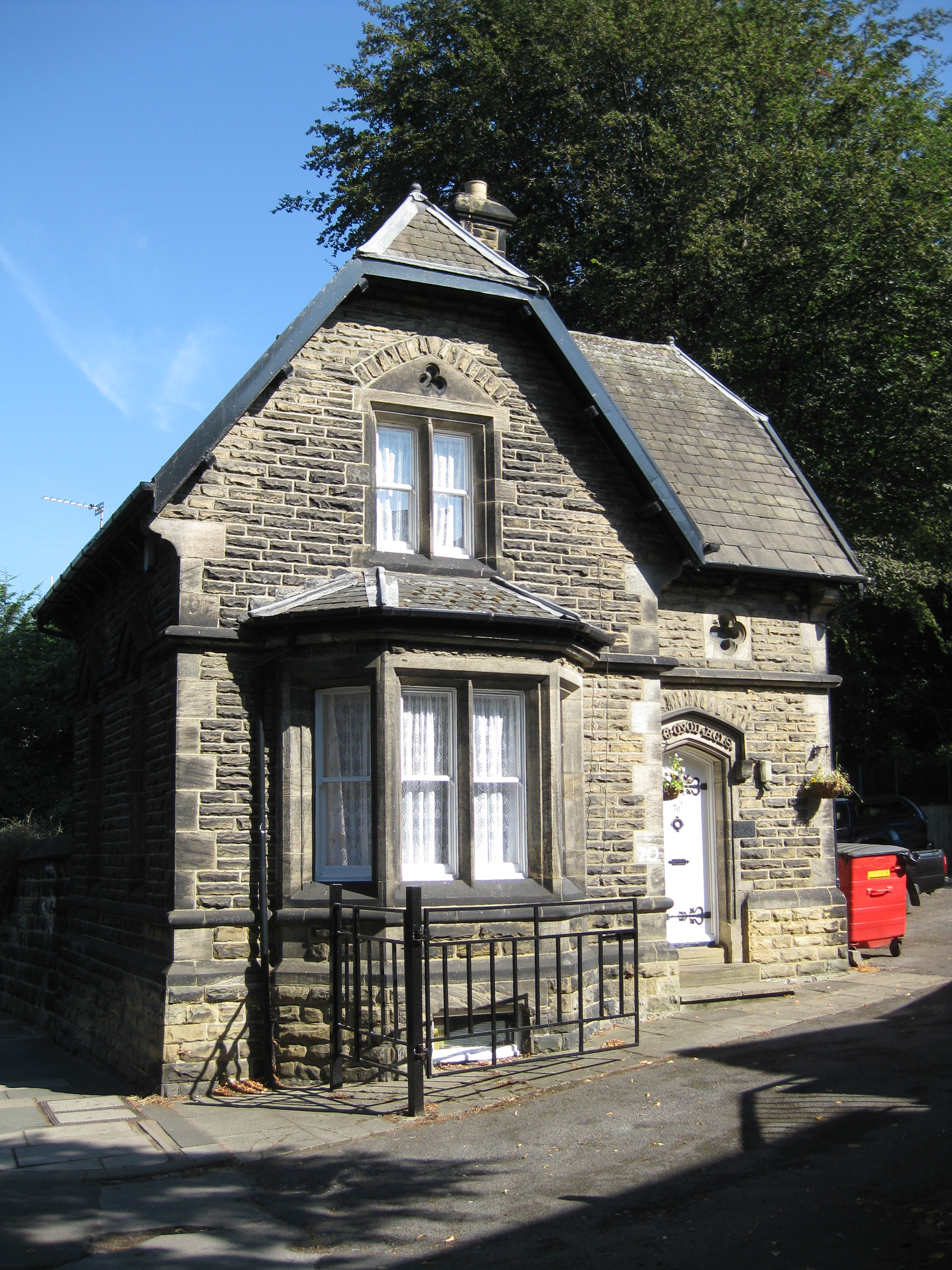
The Lodge

Headingley Castle is a large house and Grade II listed building off Headingley Lane, Headingley, Leeds, now converted into flats.

== History ==
The house was built between 1843 and 1846 by the local architect John Child for the corn merchant Thomas England. The estate was originally 22 acres. The construction of a Methodist college (now Hinsley Hall) meant that the original access road and lodge were cut off, and a new lodge was constructed on Headingley Lane in 1866. The same year, ownership passed to cloth merchant Arthur Lupton (1809–1889) of the Lupton family. From 1909 to 1943 it was the home of entrepreneur and art collector Frank Harris Fulford. The house was converted into a school for the blind in the 1960s, which closed by 1993. It was used as offices by Leeds City Council who put it on sale in 2000, and it was converted into flats.

== Architecture ==
Headingley Castle is the largest of several Tudor Gothic houses designed by John Child, with an exterior of ashlar and a slate roof. Child employed modern building techniques and materials inside including cast iron in its construction with the emphasis on making it fireproof. It features a central three-storey tower and has battlements. The entry porch has a Tudor arch, with an oriel window above, and leads to an octagonal entrance hall. Octagonal buttresses become octagonal turrets at the top, and there is a larger octagonal turret at the rear.

The lodge is of gritstone with a slate roof. Above the door is the motto 'ACE QUOD ACIS' (do what you do -i.e. well).

== See also ==
- Listed buildings in Leeds (Headingley Ward)
