= Zam-Buk =

Patent medicine

Advertisements for Zam-Buk
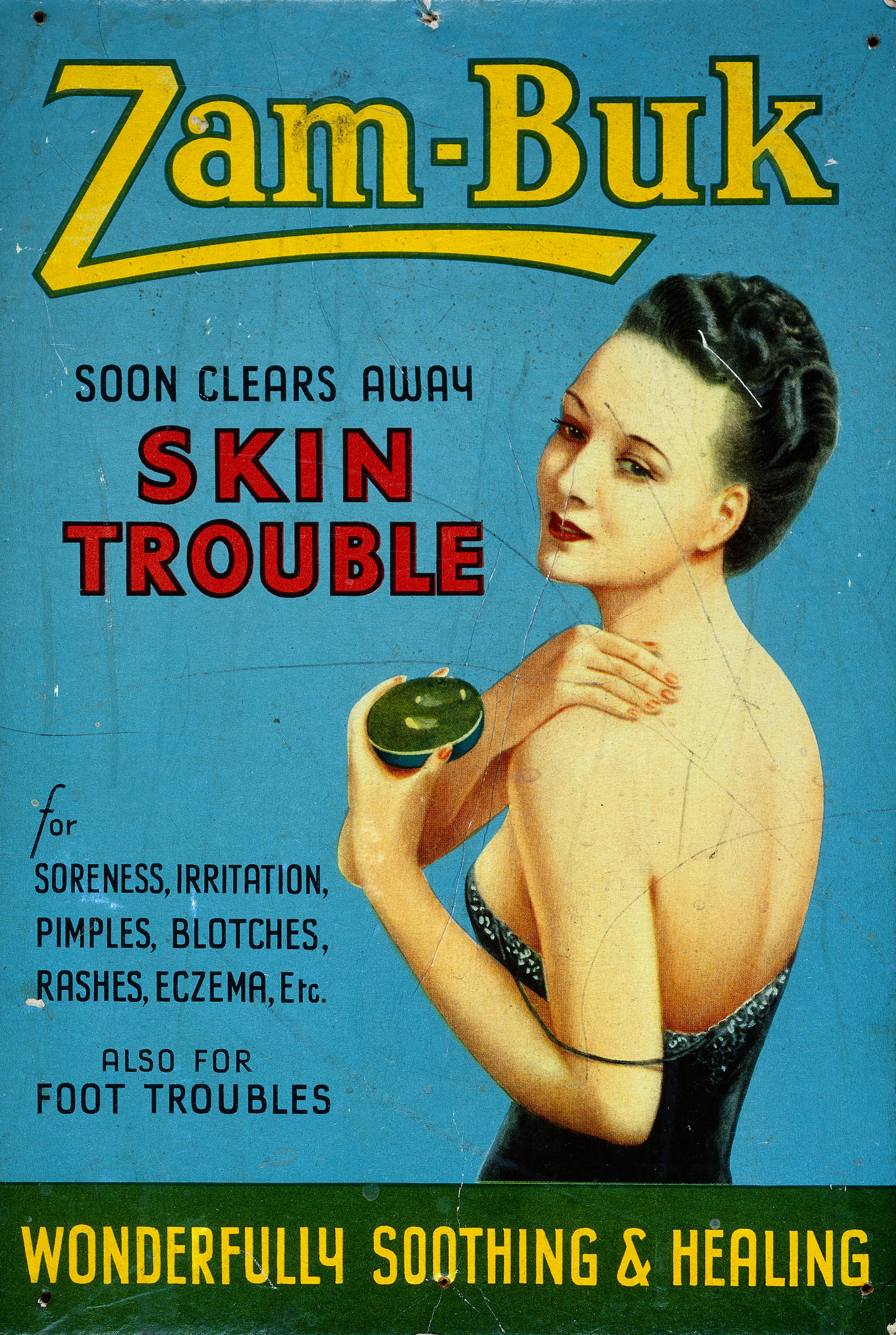
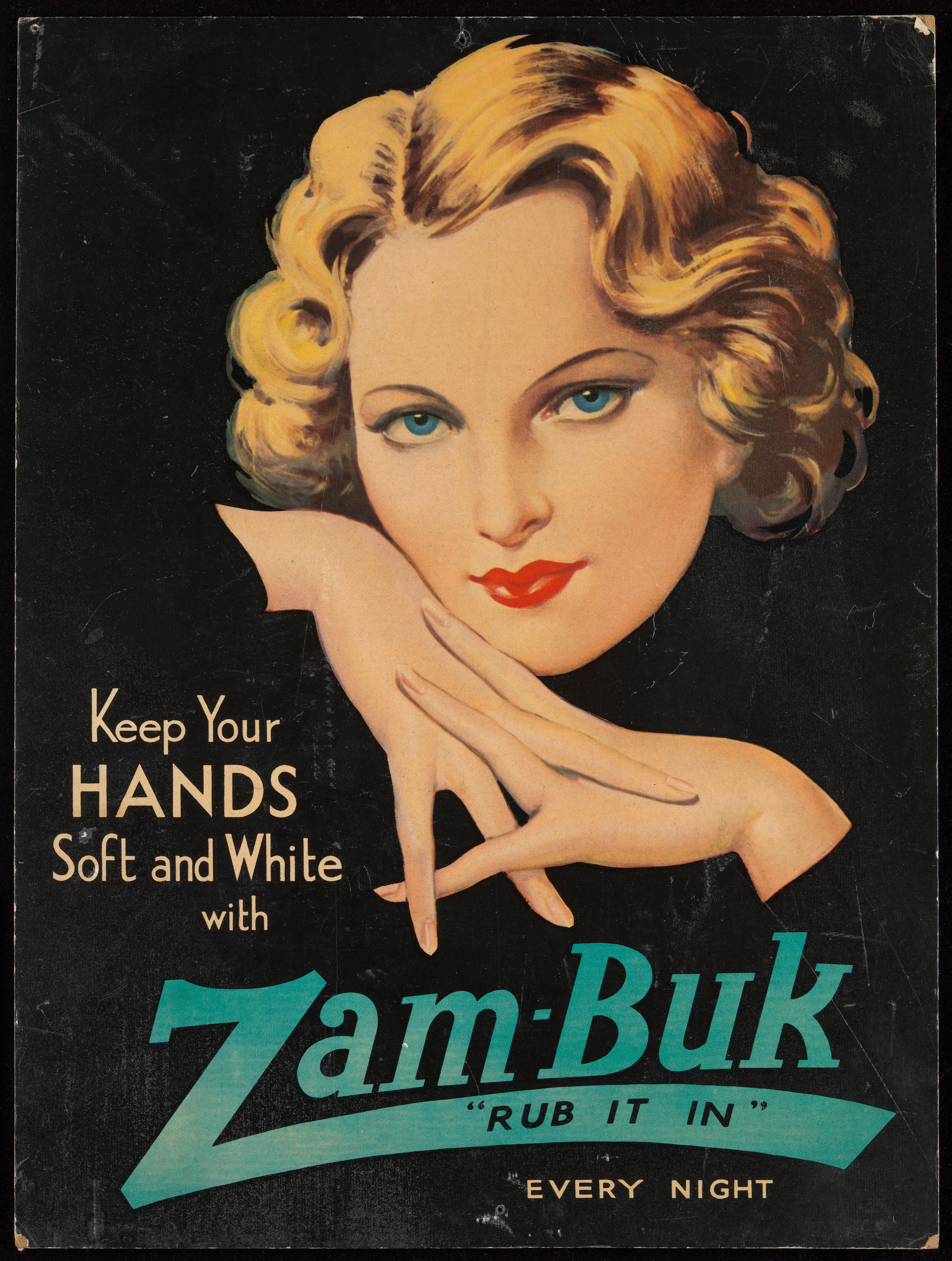

Zam-Buk is a patent medicine which was produced by the Zam-Buk Company of Leeds, England, founded by Charles Edward Fulford. It was first sold by his Bile Beans company in 1902, as a herbal balm and antiseptic ointment; the use of a complementary Zam-Buk soap was recommended to augment the treatment. The ointment was advertised as being effective against a wide range of conditions, including cuts, bruises, sprains, ulcers, bleeding piles and even colds and toothache. It could also be used as an embrocation by rubbing it into the muscles of the back, legs or feet.

The source of the name is uncertain, but a link to South Africa has been suggested. It remains very widely popular in South Africa. The brand name was at one time used to refer to ambulance-men and first aiders at rugby league matches in Australia and New Zealand.

The product is still manufactured today, often by Bayer, who now owns the trade mark in some, but not all, countries. It is available in Southern Africa, Malaysia, Indonesia, Singapore and Thailand.

== Formulation ==
In the early 20th century, it was reported that the formulation comprised 66% paraffin wax, 20% pale resin (colophony), and 14% eucalyptus oil, with small amounts of other ingredients. More recently, the composition was given as 5% eucalyptus oil, 1.8% camphor, 0.5% thyme oil, and 0.65% sassafras oil. The South African, English and Thai varieties do not contain sassafras. A 1908 report published in The British Medical Journal estimated that the cost of ingredients for a standard 0.6-ounce (17 g) box was one farthing, yet the retail price of was 1s 1½ d.

== Sports use ==
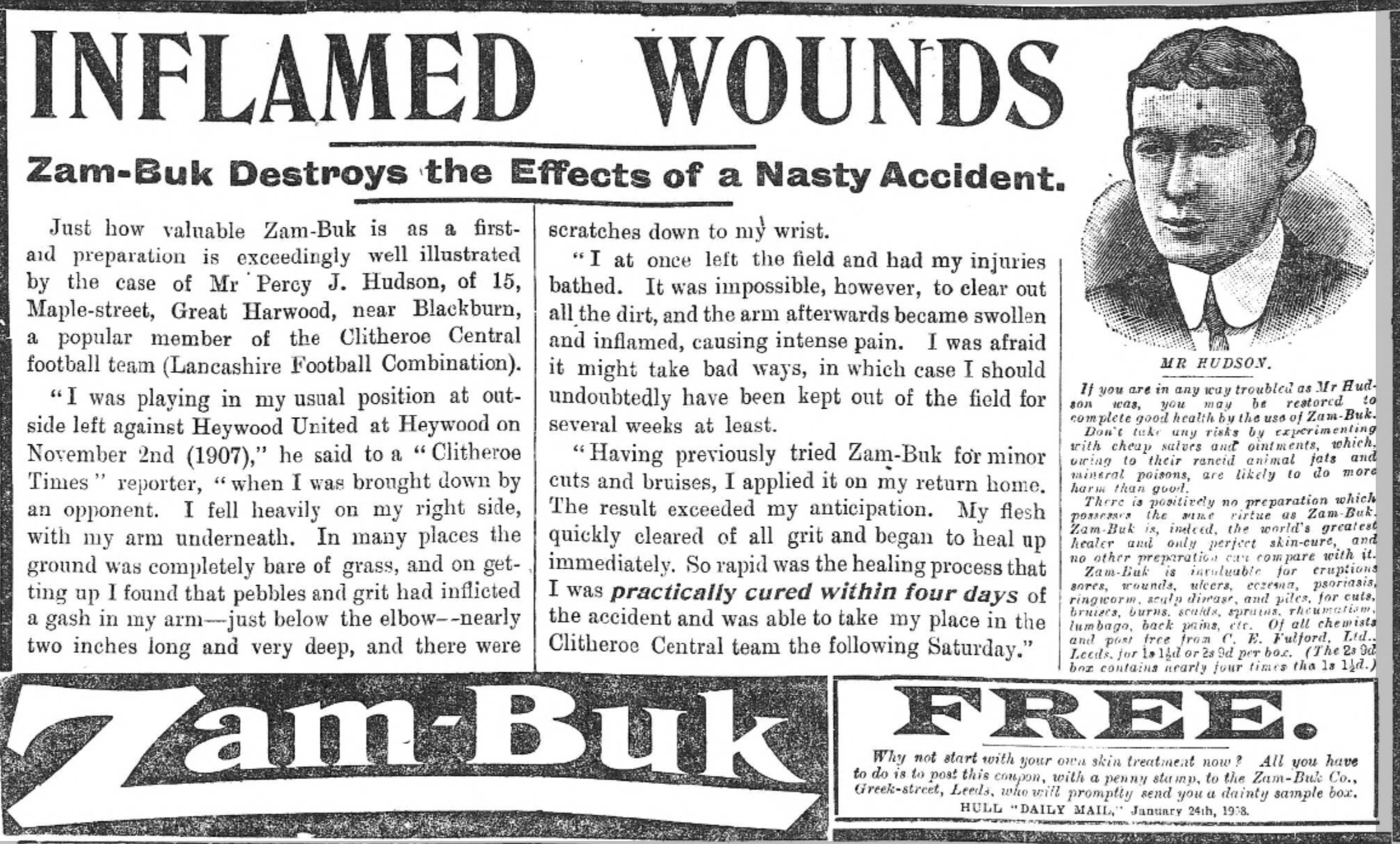
A nationwide advert with endorsement from Clitheroe Central F.C.'s Percy Hudson, Hull Daily Mail, 24 January 1908

Widely used in earlier times as an all-round antiseptic and healing ointment, particularly with rugby players worldwide.

== Branding and production ==
When Radio Luxembourg started longwave commercial radio broadcasts in English in 1933, its first advertisers were Fulford's Zam-Buk and Bile Beans.

The Zam-Buk brand and trademark were eventually acquired by Fisons, but production ceased in 1994 after the business was sold to Rhone-Poulenc; the product was revived in the United Kingdom by Rose & Co. in 1996. After the original trademarks expired, Rose & Co successfully resisted a new application by a third party to register Zam-Buk as a trademark in 2008. As of 2015, the trademark for Zam-Buk is registered to Bayer Consumer Care AG in Australia, Canada and the United States.. Zam Buk is manufactured for Bayer in Thailand by Interthai Pharmaceutical Manufacturing and is distributed in Malaysia, Thailand, Singapore, Indonesia and South Africa.

In Leeds, the tin boxes used for Zam-buk were printed in Hunslet by Charles Lightowler, at their Hunslet Printing Sheds on Jack Lane. They also printed the Peps and Bile Beans tins, which were delivered by horse and cart to the Fulford's factory on Carlton Hill, off Woodhouse Lane.
