= Ghost sign =

Old painted advertisement on a building

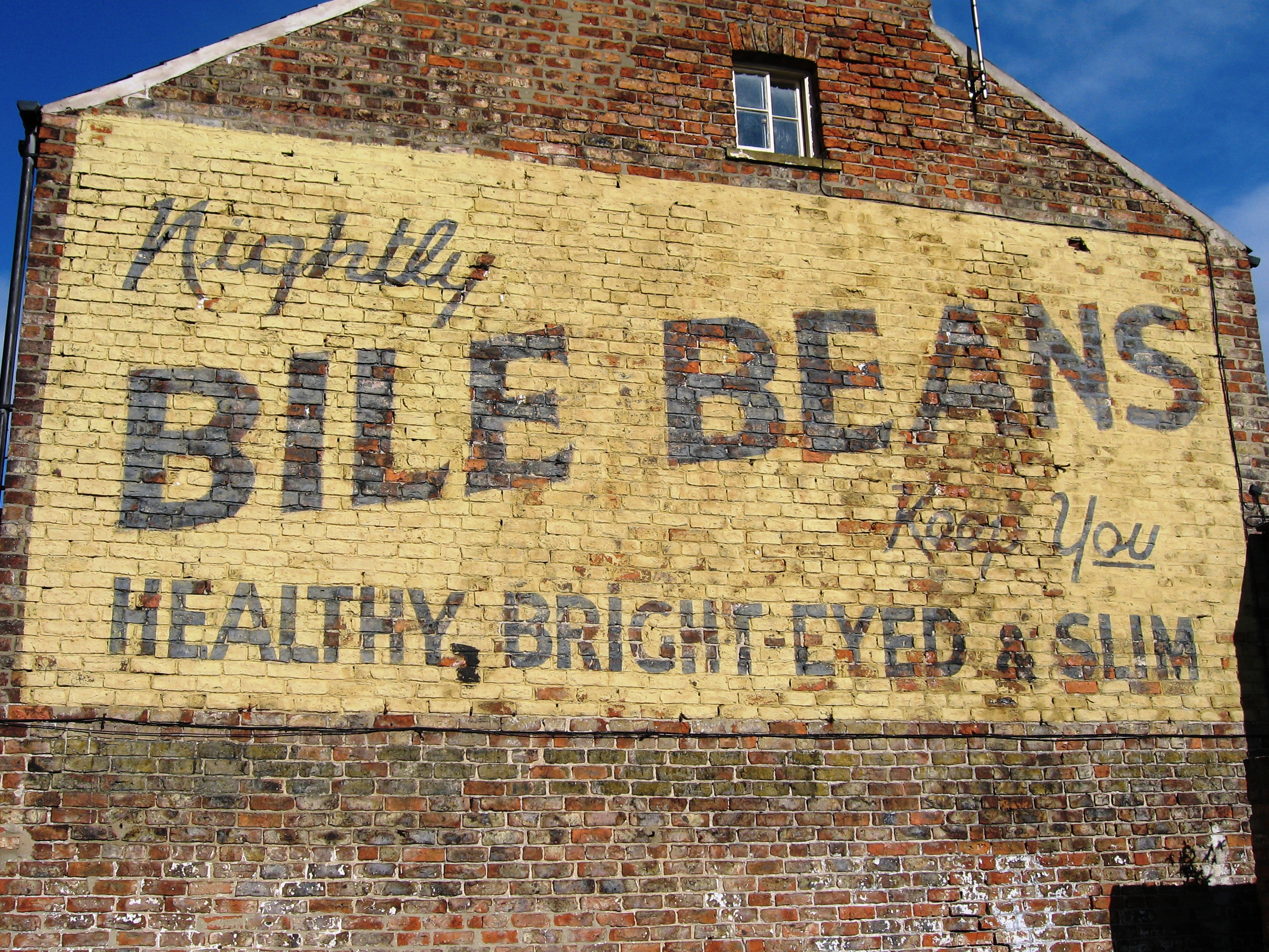
Ghost sign advertising Bile Beans in York, England

A ghost sign is an old hand-painted advertising sign that has been preserved on a building for an extended period of time. The sign may be kept for its nostalgic appeal, or simply indifference by the owner.

== History and preservation ==
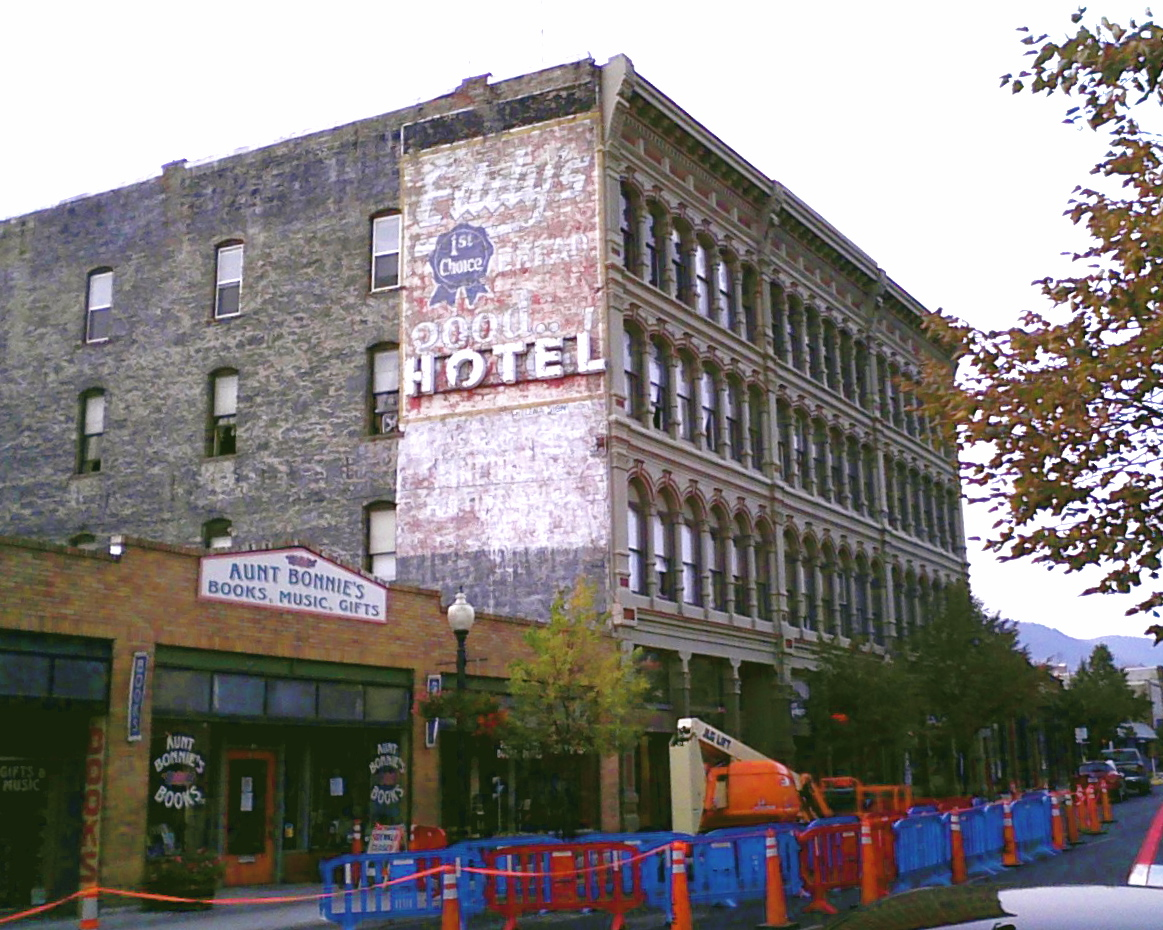
Ghost sign for Eddy's Bread in Helena, Montana, before 2012 restoration

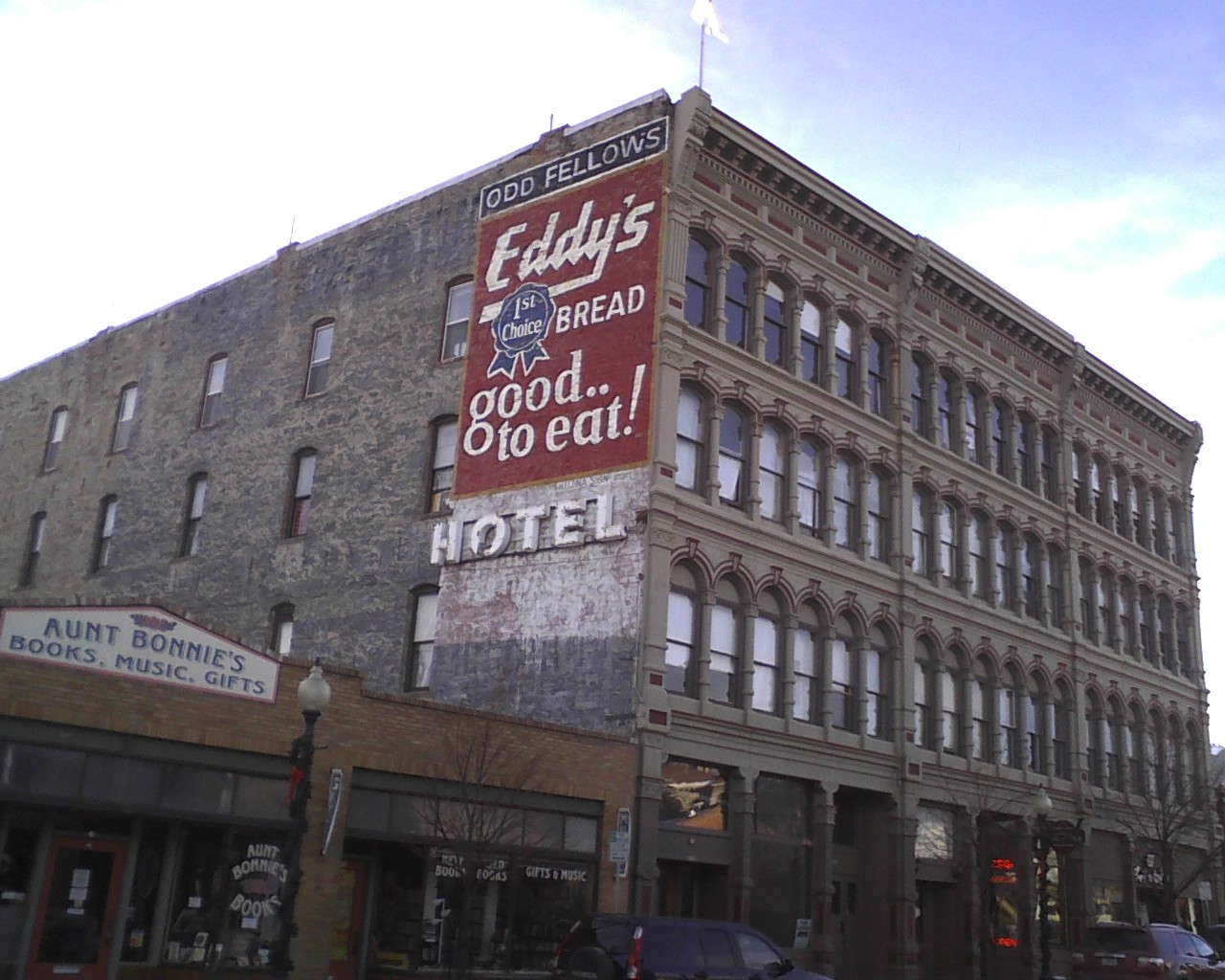
Ghost sign for Eddy's Bread, after restoration

Ghost signs are found around the world with the United States, the United Kingdom, France and Canada having many surviving examples. Ghost signs are also called fading ads or brickads. In many cases these are advertisements painted on brick that remained over time. Old painted advertisements are occasionally discovered upon demolition of later-built adjoining structures. Throughout rural areas, old barn advertisements continue to promote defunct brands and quaint roadside attractions.

Many ghost signs from the 1890s to the 1960s are still visible. Such signs were most commonly used in the decades before the Great Depression.

The painters of the signs were called "wall dogs". As signage advertising formats changed, less durable signs appeared in the later 20th century, and ghost signs from that era are less common.

Ghost signs were originally painted with oil-based house paints. The paint that has survived the test of time most likely contains lead, which keeps it strongly adhered to the masonry surface. Ghost signs were often preserved through repainting the entire sign since the colors often fade over time. When ownership changed, a new sign would be painted over the old one.

In 2013, conservators undertook an effort to preserve ghost signs in Philadelphia.

In Detroit, well-preserved ghost signs have been uncovered when an adjoining building is demolished as part of the city's blight-fighting efforts.

[The signs] evoke the exuberant period of American capitalism. Consumer cultures were really getting going and there weren't many rules yet, no landmarks preservation commission or organized community saying: "Isn't this awful? There's a picture of a man chewing tobacco on the corner of my street."

— Kathleen Hulser, New York Historical Society.

== Gallery ==
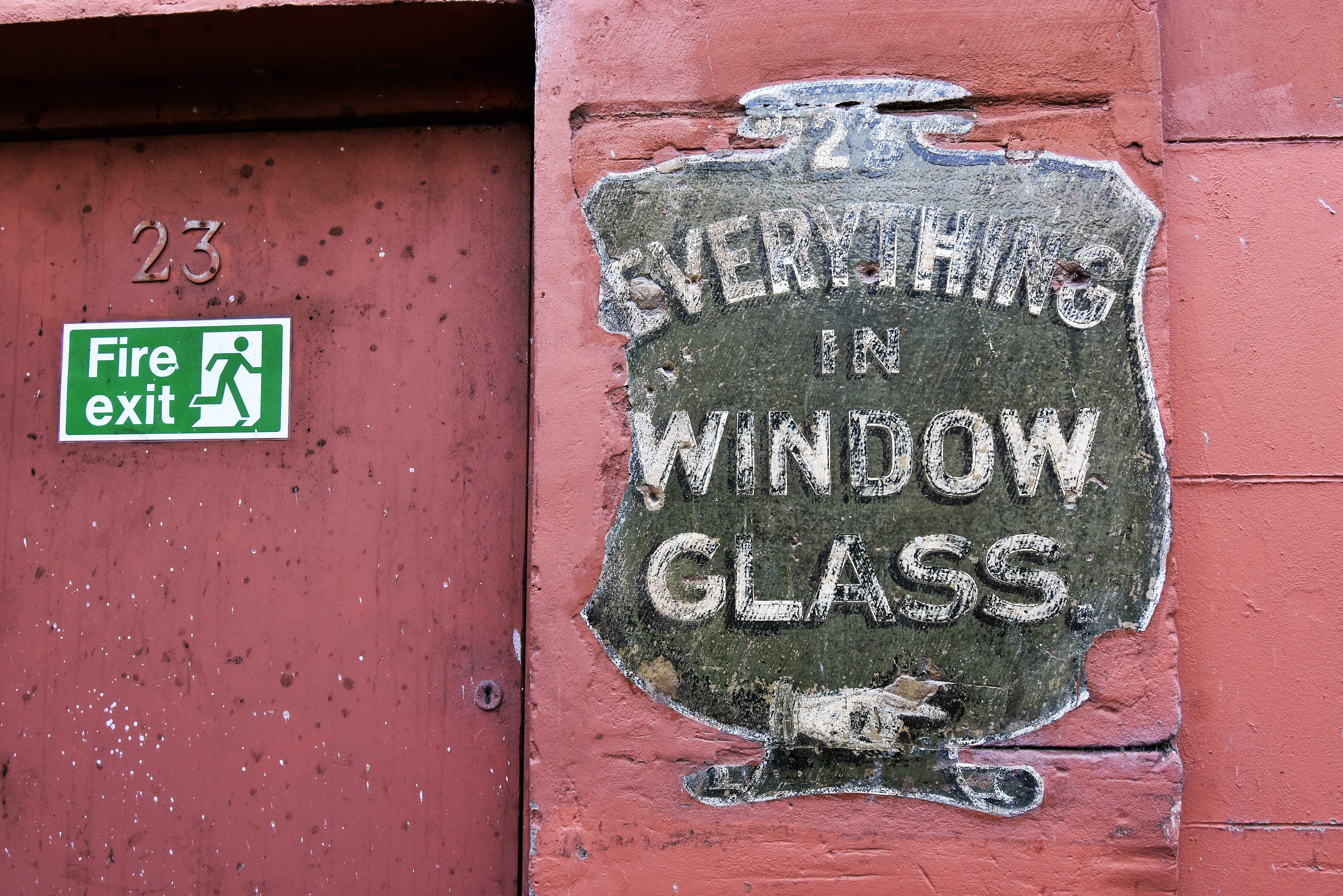
Sign in Renfrew Street, Glasgow (Scotland)

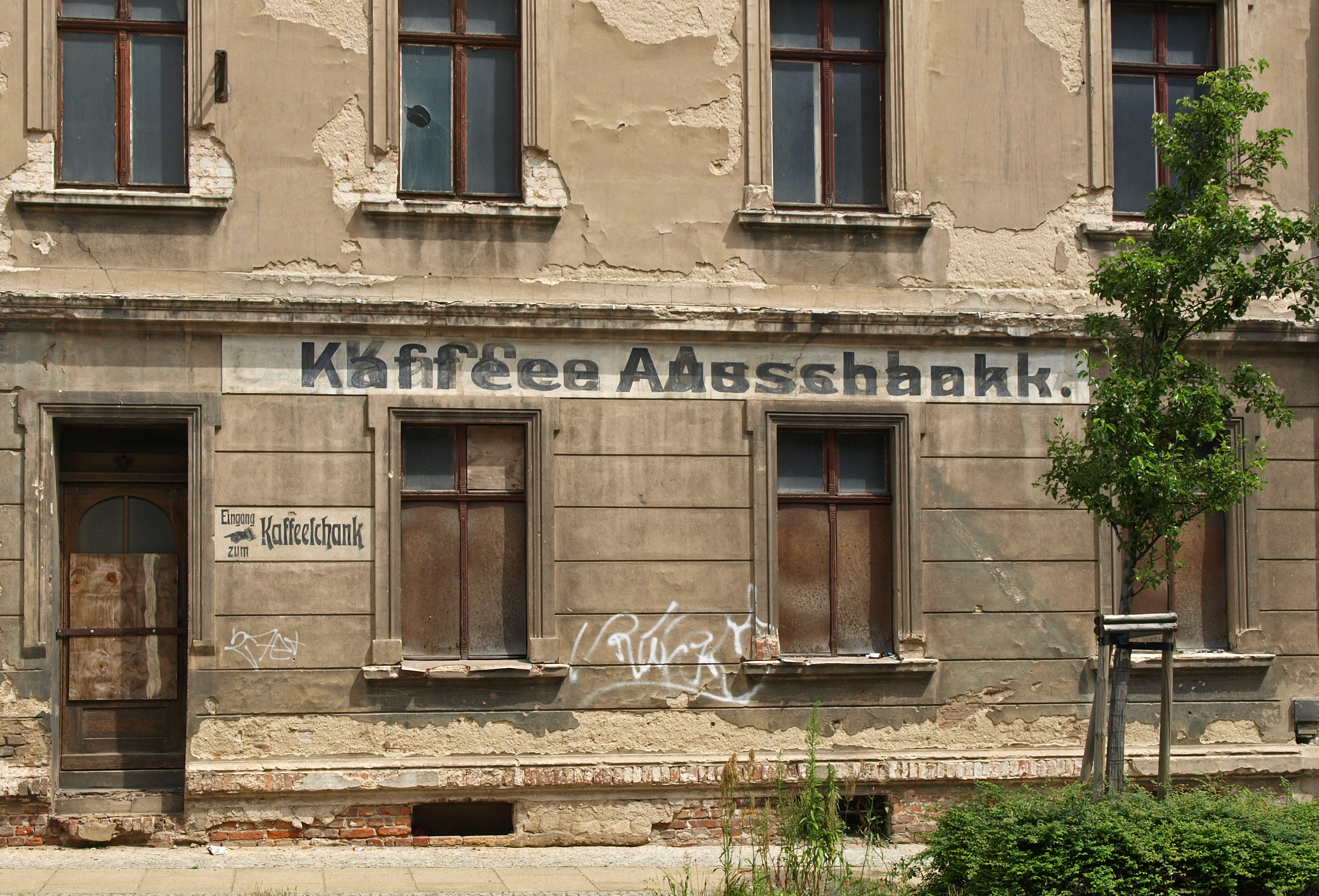
Former Kaffee-Ausschank, Görlitz (Germany)

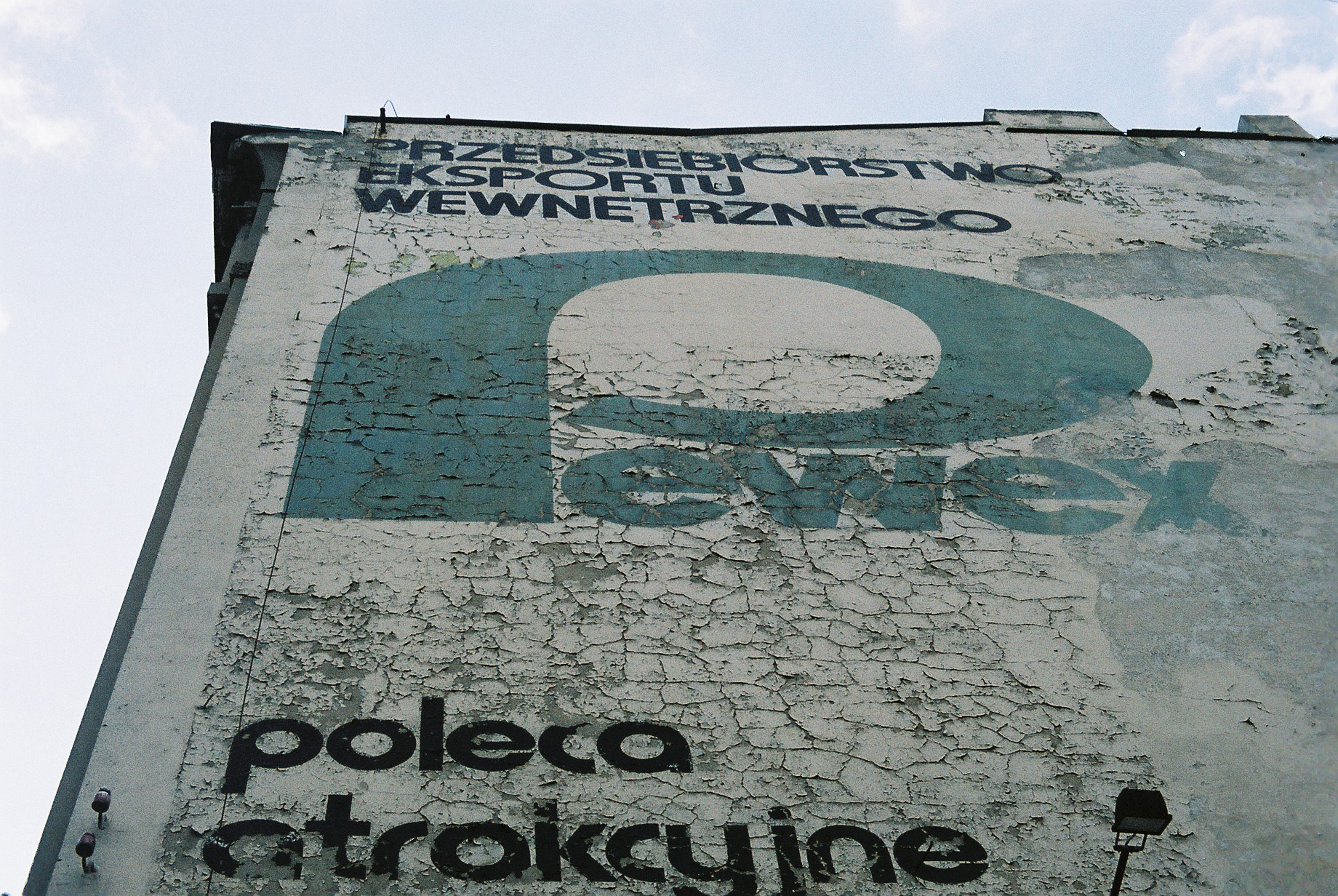
Pewex advertisement, Łódź (Poland)

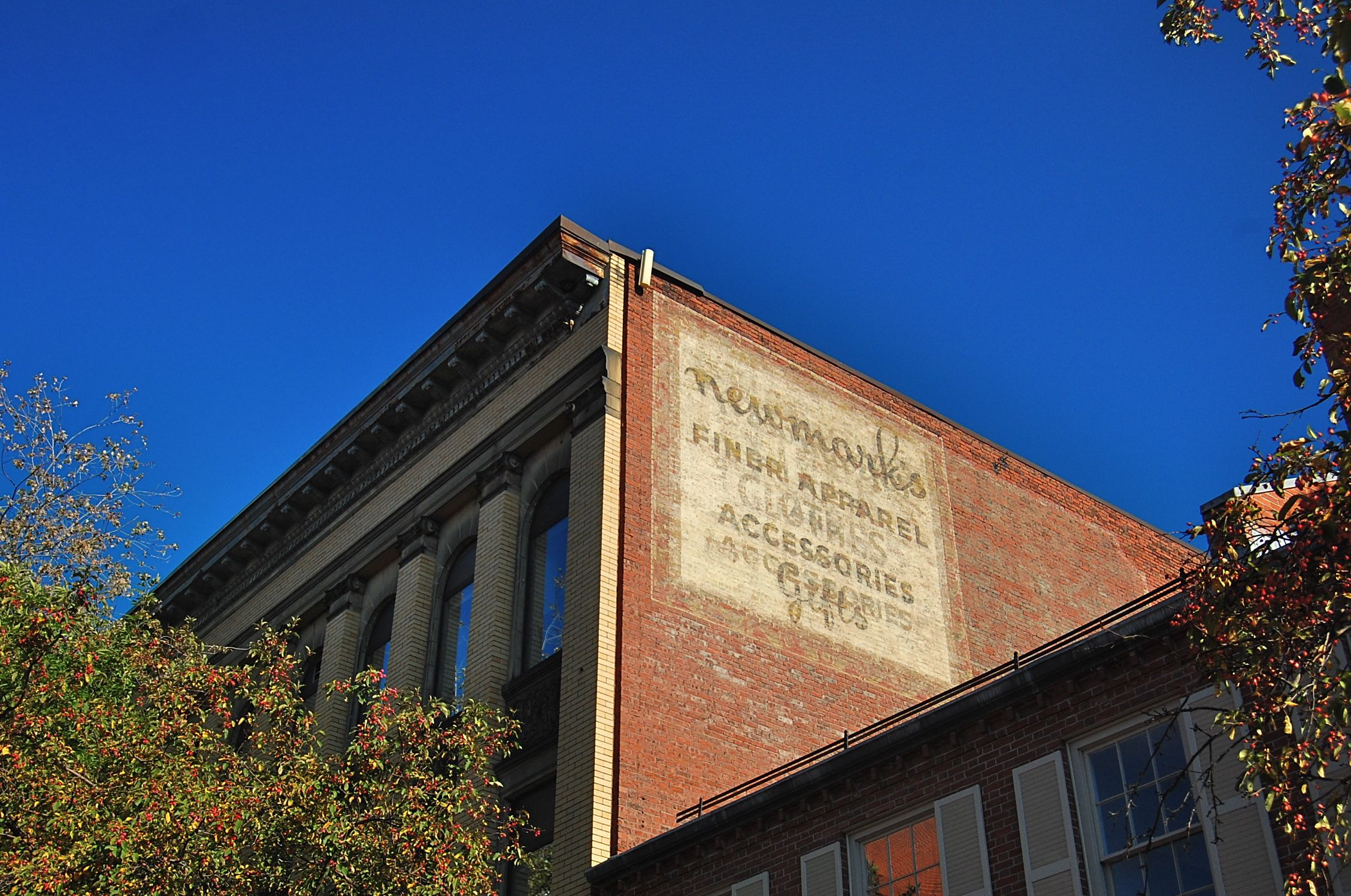
Sign for a defunct clothing store in Salem, Massachusetts (USA)

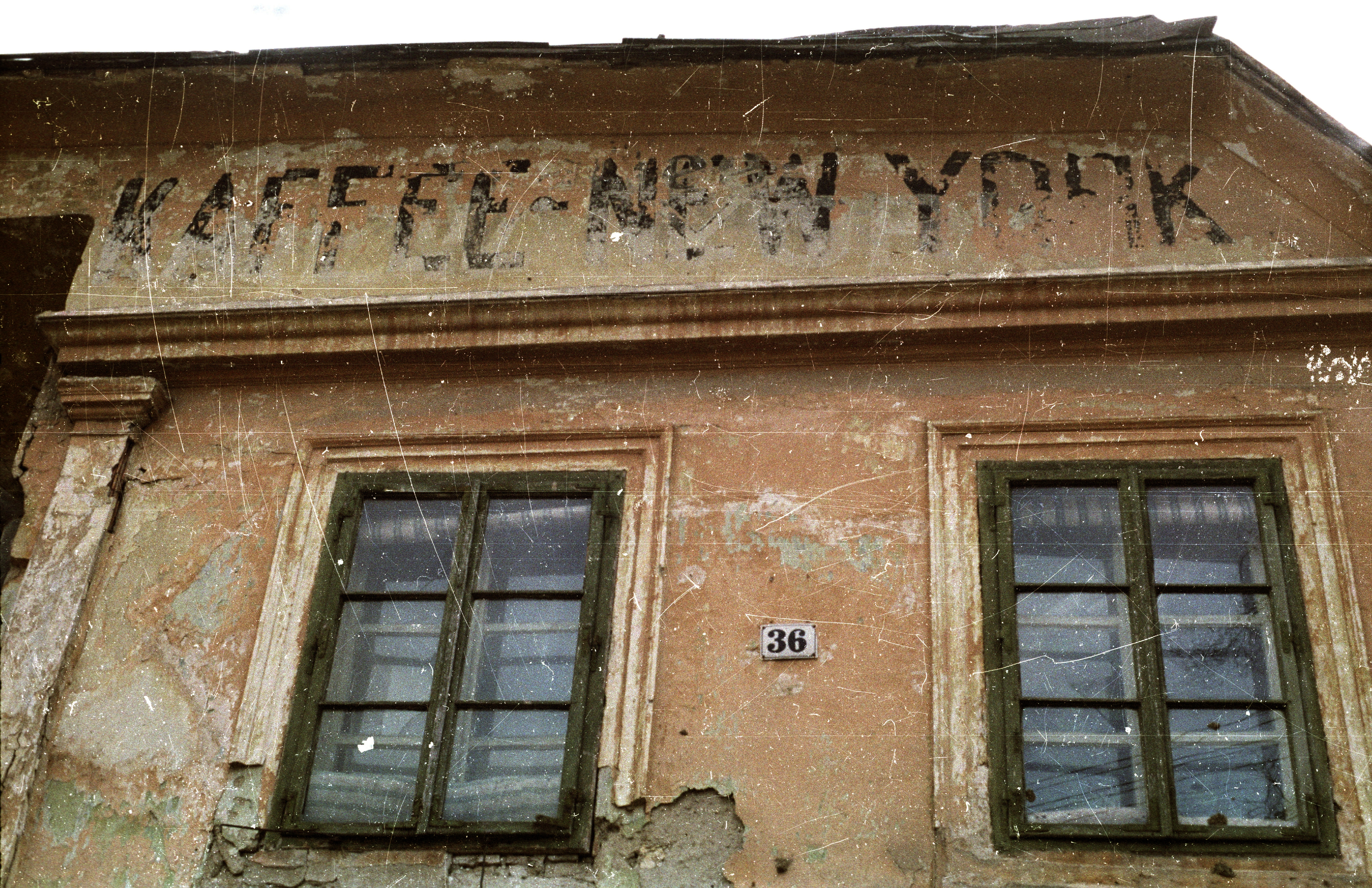
Former Kaffee-New York, Transylvania (Romania)

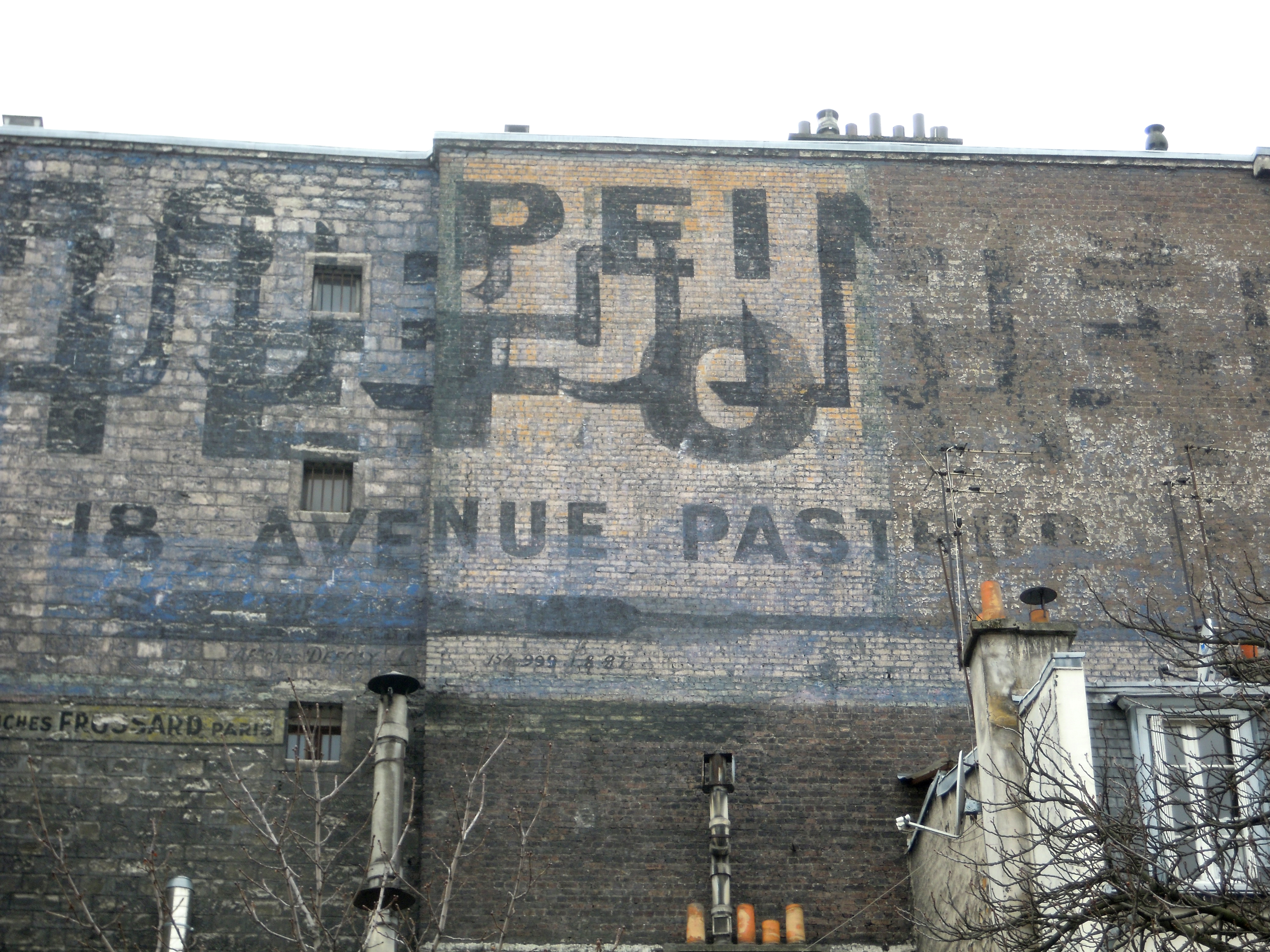
Old advertisements forming a "palimpsest", Paris (France)

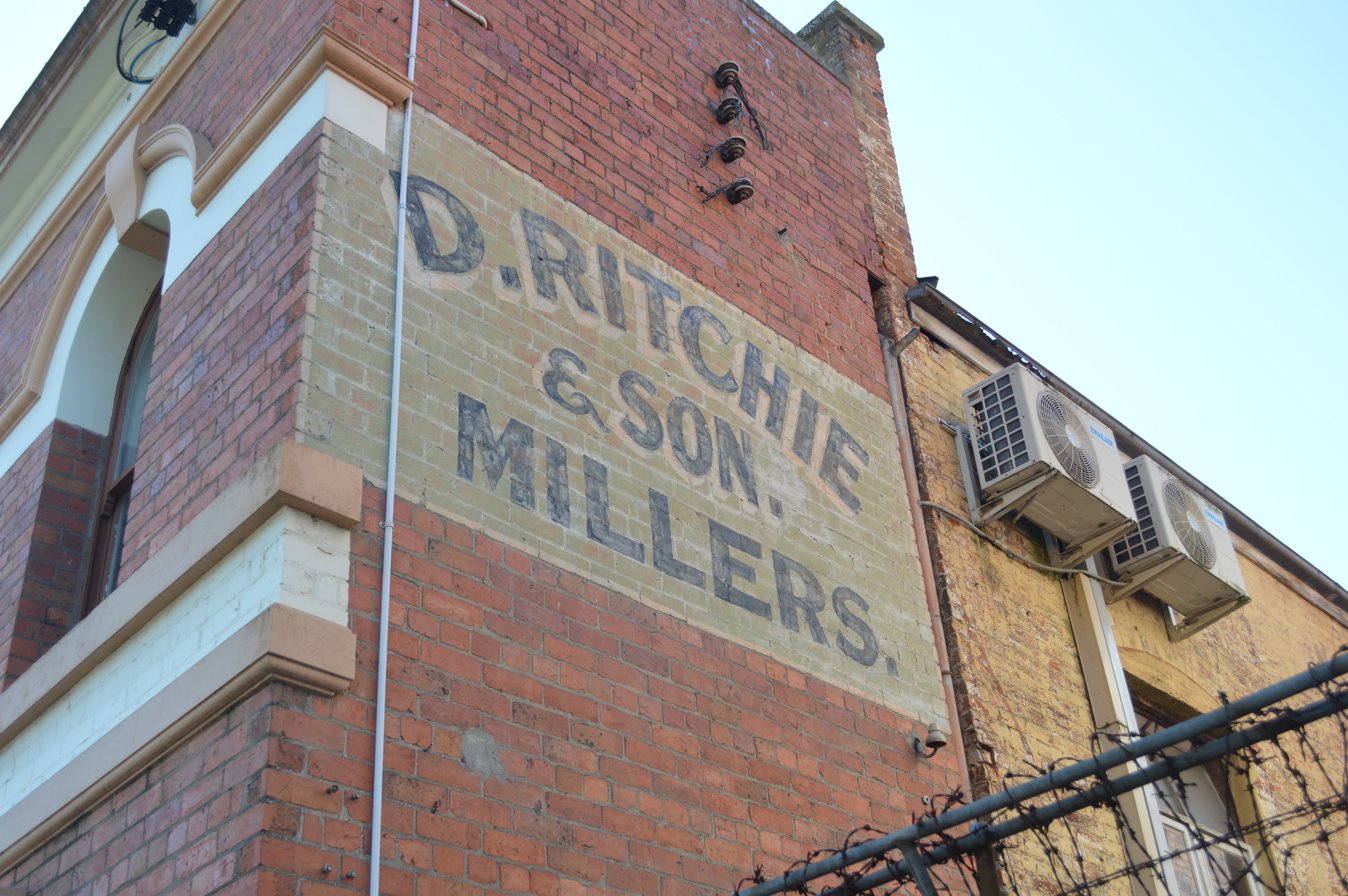
Sign for "David Ritchie & Son. Millers", Launceston, Tasmania (Australia)

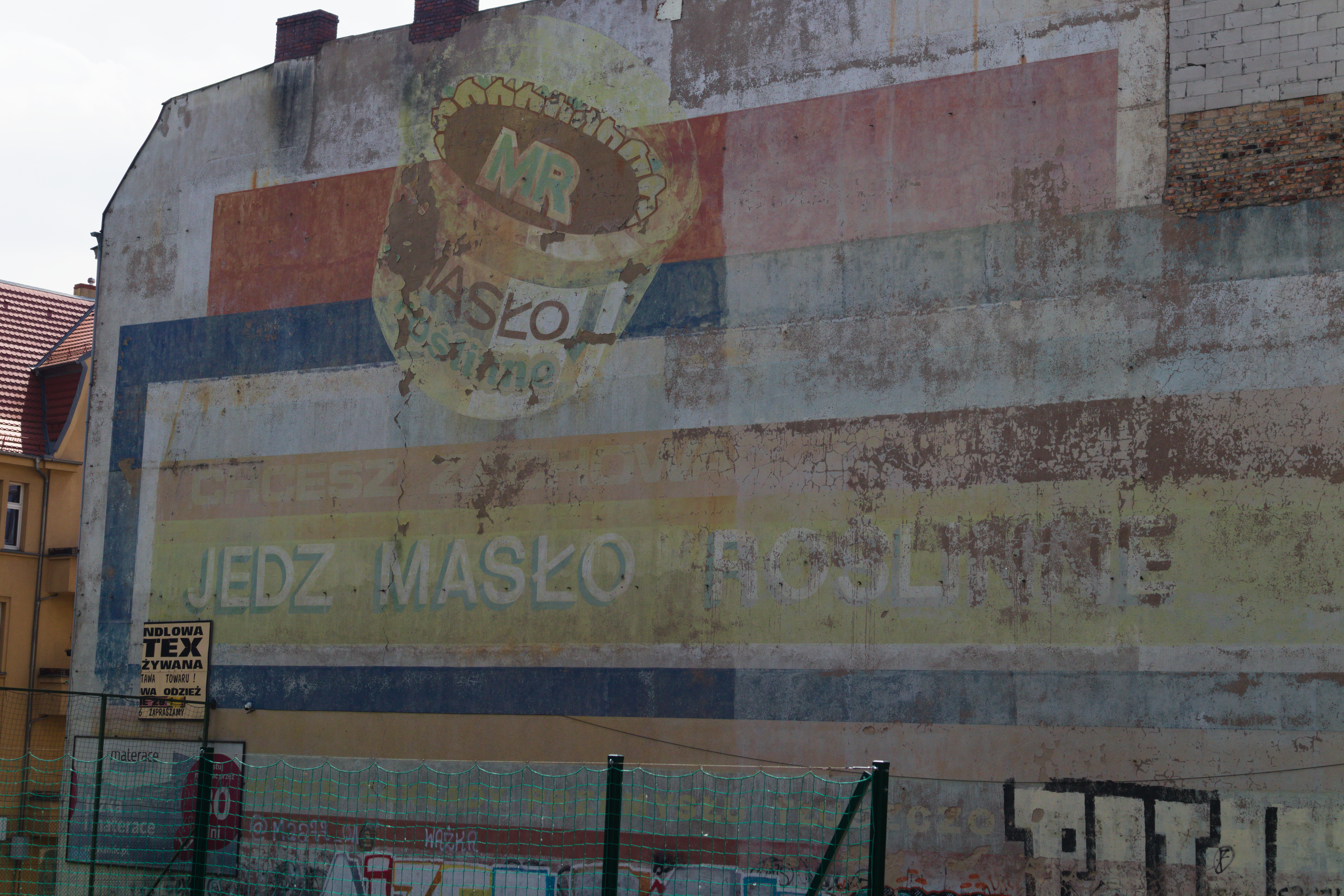
Ghost sign for MR Masło, a butter brand, in Poznań, Poland. The caption reads "Eat plant butter"

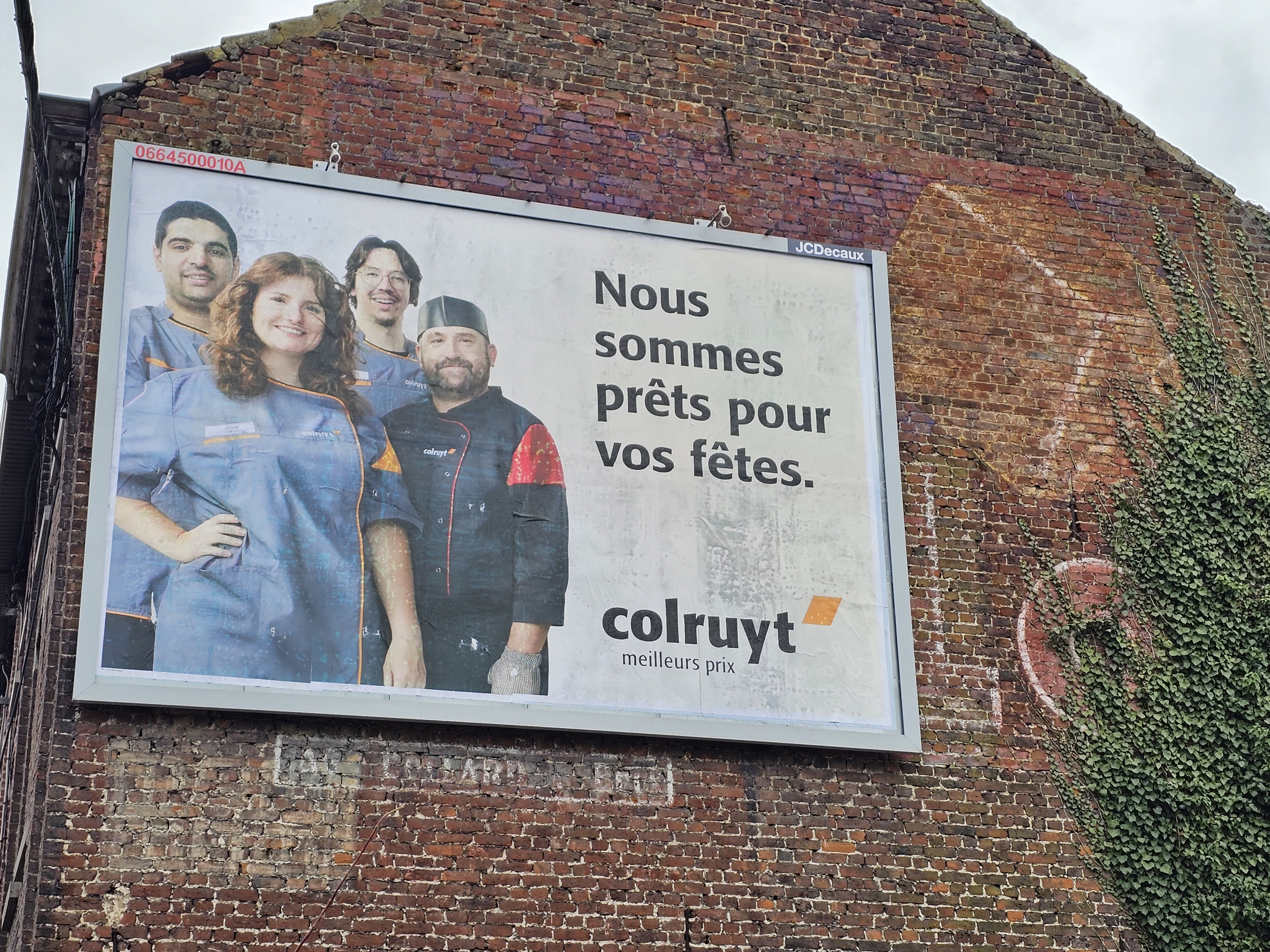
Ghost sign for Solo-branded margarine covered by a modern billboard, in Binche, Belgium.

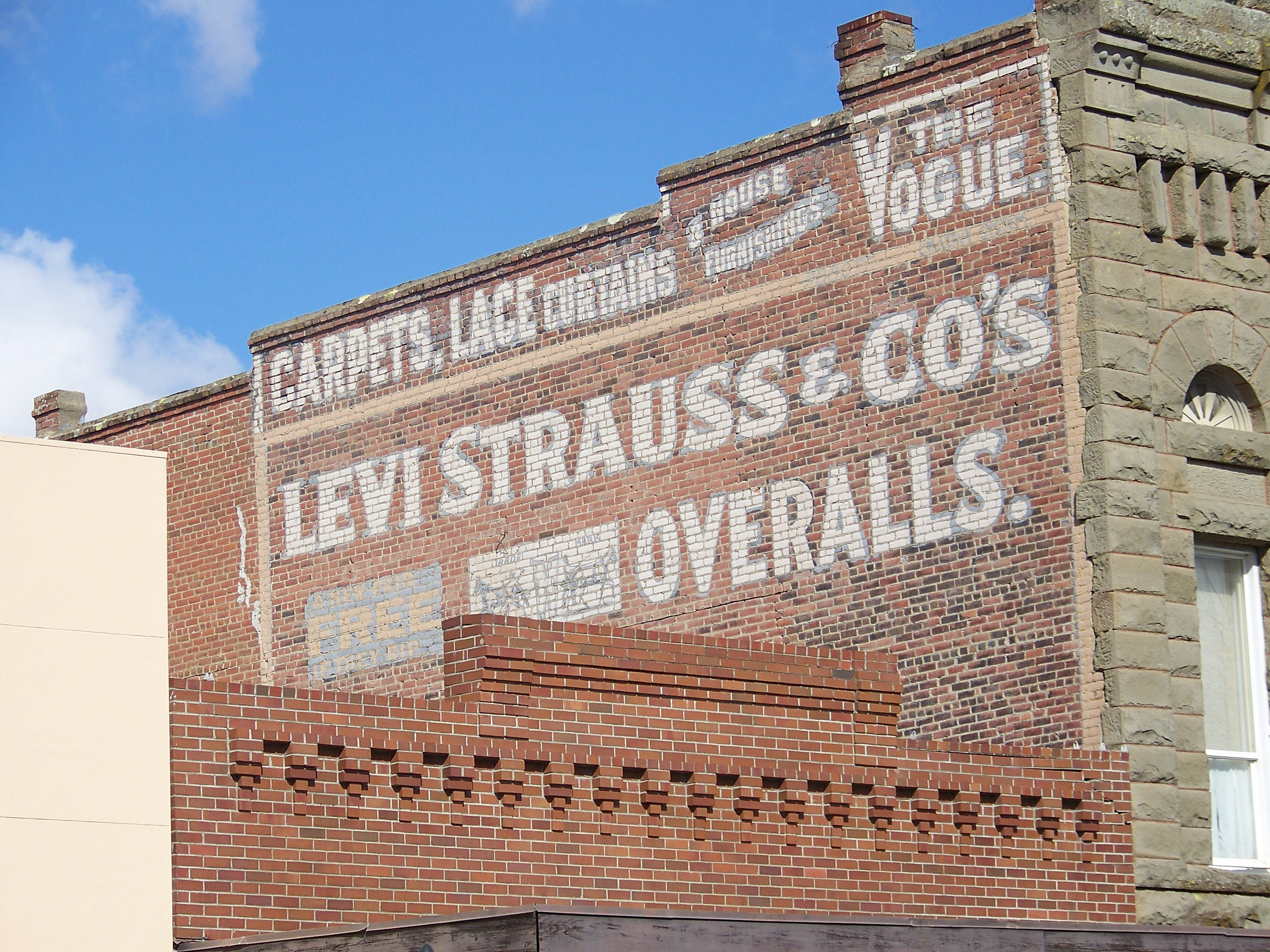
Levi Strauss & Co. sign in Woodland, California

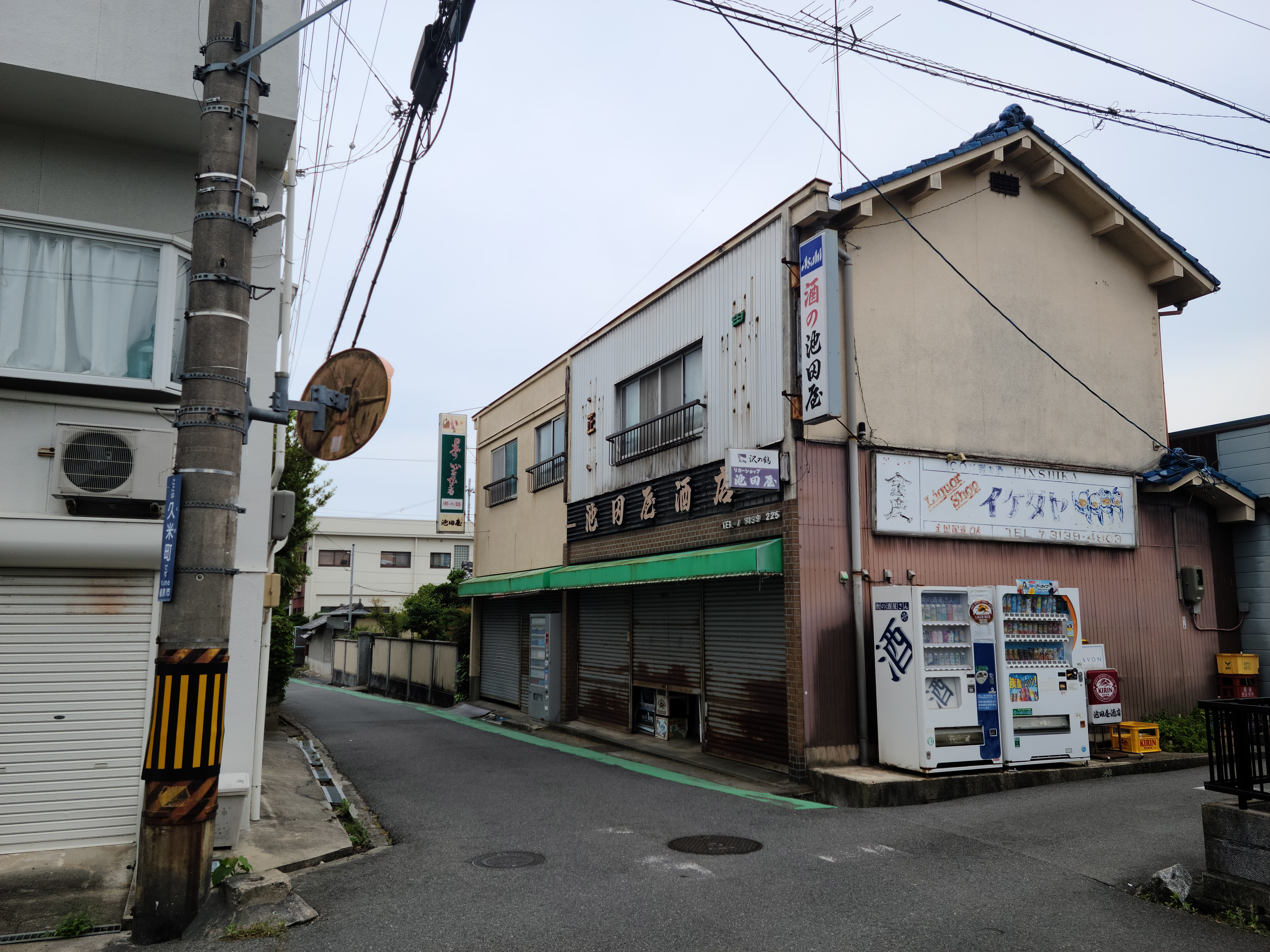
Old sign for a liquor shop in Kashihara, Japan (right)

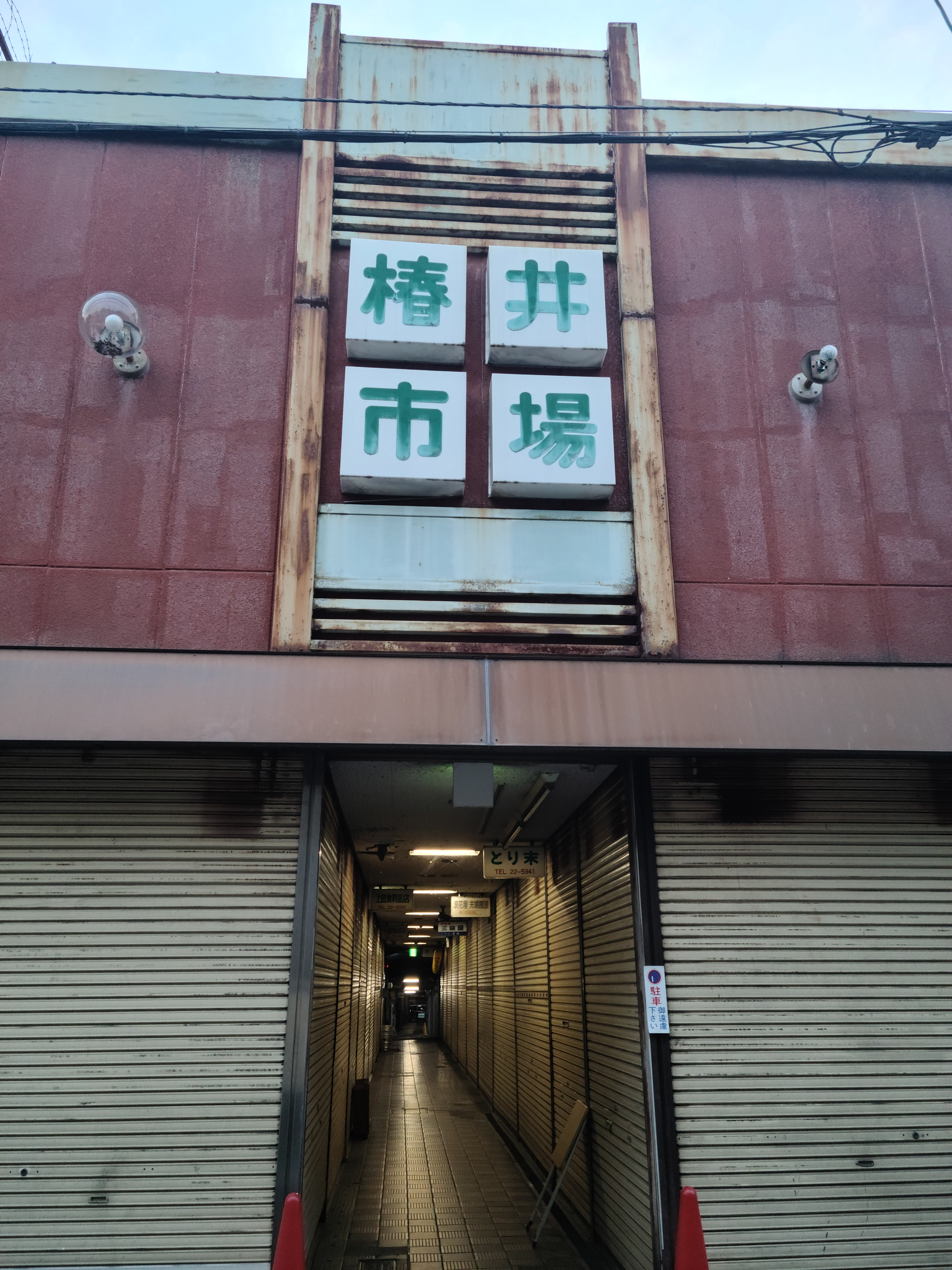
Old sign for Tsubai Market, Nara, Japan

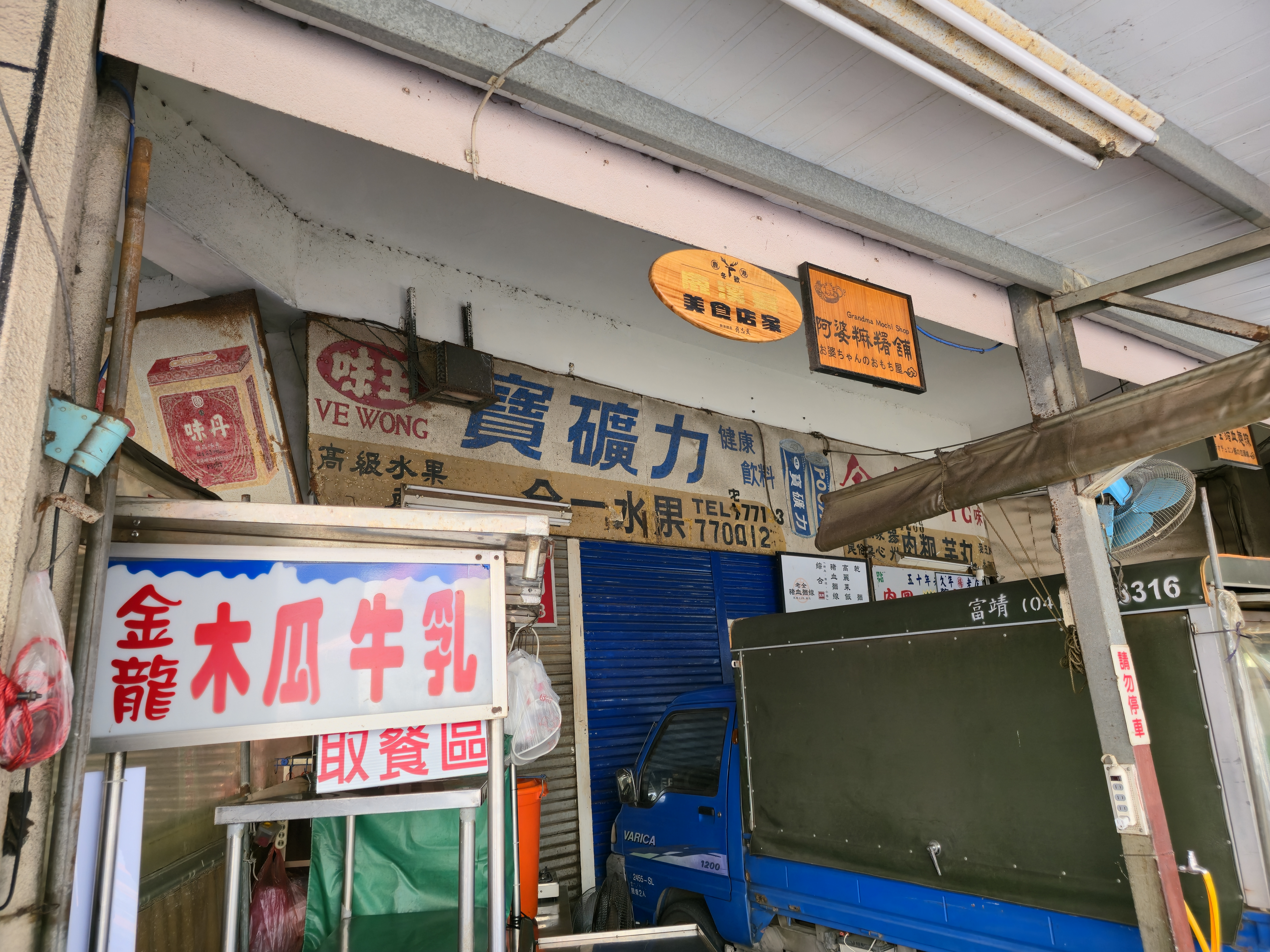
Old advertisement for a pocari drink and a fruit shop in Lukang, Taiwan

== See also ==
- Palimpsest
- Privilege sign
- Signwriter
