= Luria Neuroscience Institute =

US research institute

- Formation: 2011
- Type: Research Institute
- Location: New York City, NY
- Director: Elkhonon Goldberg
- Website: http://lninstitute.org

Luria Neuroscience Institute (LNI) and its not-for-profit arm Luria Scientific Foundation (LNF) were founded in 2011 with the broad purpose of advancing research in cognitive neuroscience and neuropsychology, and disseminating knowledge in these areas. Fostering international scientific and educational collaborations is among LNI's priorities. The Institute has been named in honor of Alexander Luria, one of the founding fathers of modern neuropsychology as a scientific discipline. LNI is based in New York City and is directed by Elkhonon Goldberg, a student and close associate of Alexander Luria.

== Research activities ==
LNI has supported and continues to support a number of research collaborations in the areas of cognitive and clinical neurosciences. These include the function and dysfunction of the frontal lobes, cognitive impairment in Parkinson's disease, shared genetic/epigenetic causation of psychiatric disorders and dementias, and others. In keeping with the LNI's priorities, these collaborations involve scientists both in leading North American and European universities.

== Educational activities ==
Luria Neuroscience Institute is offering several neuropsychology courses about the brain and brain disorders of potential interest both to the mental health professionals and the general educated public. The programs are offered in New York City.
