= Nigel Strutt =

British businessman (1916–2004)

Sir Nigel Edward Strutt DL TD (18 January 1916 – 28 January 2004) was the chairman of the Strutt & Parker (Farms) Ltd firm of agricultural property consultants, land agents and farm managers. He farmed 22,500 acres (91 km^{2}) in Essex and Suffolk. He was a Deputy Lieutenant for Essex from 1954, and High Sheriff of Essex in 1966. He was offered of a peerage but declined it, as had his great-great-grandfather, Joseph Holden Strutt.

== Early life ==
Strutt was the youngest son of Captain Edward Jolliffe Strutt and his wife Amelie (née Devas). His grandfather, Hon. Edward Gerald Strutt, was the fifth son of John James Strutt, 2nd Baron Rayleigh, and younger brother of Nobel Prize-winning physicist, John Strutt, 3rd Baron Rayleigh. His great-uncle was a founder member of the Order of Merit; his grandfather was an early Companion of Honour.

The Strutts can trace their ancestry to a miller from Essex who died in 1694. They became stalwart members of the shire gentry, and several members of the family sat in Parliament from the 18th century. Nigel's great-great-grandfather, Joseph Strutt, was an MP for 40 years and colonel of several regiments of Essex militia. He was offered a peerage, but suggested that the title be conferred on his wife instead, so Lady Charlotte Strutt became Baroness Rayleigh.

Strutt was educated at Winchester College, following in the footsteps of his father and grandfather. He showed interest in farming, and attended Wye College in Kent.

== Career ==
Strutt joined the Essex Yeomanry in 1937, and moved to Africa to become an honorary aide-de-camp to the governor of Northern Rhodesia. He joined the Essex Yeomanry Royal Horse Artillery on the outbreak of the Second World War. He served as a forward observation officer in North Africa and was severely wounded in 1941 near Bardia, in Libya, losing his right eye. After recovering from his injuries, he was offered a staff position as an ADC in Palestine, but asked to be returned to his regiment instead. However, before he could rejoin his comrades, he was captured by a German patrol and sent to a prisoner-of-war camp in northern Italy. In Camp 41, near Parma, he shared a room with Edward Tomkins and Pat Gibson, all three becoming firm friends. He was best man at Tomkins's wedding in 1955.

Strutt was repatriated in 1943 on medical grounds and in exchange for a German prisoner. He kept his parole, rejoining the Essex Yeomanry after the war and was later awarded the Territorial Decoration.

After the war, Strutt became a farmer, living for the remainder of his life in a farmhouse in Terling. He farmed 22,500 acres (91 km^{2}) in Essex and Suffolk, through two family firms, Lord Rayleigh's Farms and Strutt & Parker Farms. The farms produced wheat, oats, barley, potatoes, peas and sugar beet, with herds of Friesian cattle at Terling and Lavenham producing two million gallons of milk per annum.

== Later life ==
Strutt was a member of the National Economic Development Council for Agriculture, and chairman of the Advisory Council for Agriculture and Horticulture from 1973-80. He was president of the Country Landowners' Association from 1967-9, president of the British Friesian Cattle Society in 1974-5, and president of the Royal Agricultural Society of England in 1982-3. He became a fellow at Wye College in 1970, and was Master of the Worshipful Company of Farmers in 1976-7. He received the Massey Ferguson Award in 1976, and received honorary degrees from Cranfield University and Essex University.

Strutt became a Deputy Lieutenant for Essex in 1954 and in 1966 he was High Sheriff of Essex. He was knighted in 1972. Like his ancestor, Joseph Strutt, he was offered a peerage, but declined.

Strutt had an apartment in The Albany, and was a member of Brooks's. He enjoyed outdoor activities, such as walking, game shooting, and skiing. He never married.
