= Edward Gerald Strutt =

Edward Gerald Strutt CH (10 April 1854 in Witham, Essex – 8 March 1930 in Hatfield Peverel, Essex) was a British agriculturist who played an important role in British food and agricultural planning during World War I, for which he was appointed to the Order of the Companions of Honour in 1917. Other than this, he ran much of his family's estates, served on government committees and he co-founded the surveyors and land agents Strutt & Parker.

== Family and early life ==
Fifth son of John James Strutt, second Baron Rayleigh, he was born at the family estate, Terling Place, in Terling, Essex in 1854. He was educated at Winchester College then Trinity College, Cambridge.

He married Maria Louisa Tufnell (1854–10 May 1938) on 29 October 1878. They had six children:

- Emily Norah Strutt (10 September 1879 – 13 October 1966)
- Captain Gerald Murray Strutt (9 October 1880 – 16 November 1955) who married Rhoda Hope on 14 July 1910. They had three children:
  - Pamela Strutt (29 November 1911) who married Richard Gatty on 17 October 1935. They had four children.
  - Major James Hedley Strutt (20 April 1913 – 25 July 1965)
  - Ursula Joyce Strutt (17 April 1917 – 31 January 2007) who married Major James Harden on 27 July 1948. They had three children.
- John James Strutt (26 October 1881 – 12 November 1968) who married Hon. Agnes Dewar on 24 February 1914. They had two children:
  - Edward Alexander Strutt (29 November 1914 – 21 October 1991) who married Janet Phillips-Higgins on 22 April 1975.
  - Joan Eleanor Strutt (13 October 1916 – 31 May 2006)
- Evelyn Mary Strutt (6 February 1883 – 10 December 1965) who married Major Claude Tritton on 17 July 1906. They had two sons.
- Captain Edward Jolliffe Strutt (4 January 1884 – 24 May 1964) who married Amelie Devas on 7 November 1912. They had:
  - Lt.-Col. Mark Frederick Strutt (24 September 1913 – 16 June 1982)
  - Sir Nigel Strutt (18 January 1916 – 28 January 2004)
  - Gillian Leonora Strutt (11 June 1918)
- Clara Helena Strutt (25 March 1888 – 1972)

His eldest brother was physicist John Strutt, 3rd Baron Rayleigh who co-discovered argon and discovered Rayleigh scattering. He was uncle of physicist Robert Strutt, 4th Baron Rayleigh.

== Career ==
After finishing his studies at Cambridge in 1874, Strutt apprenticed for a firm of "land agents", Rawlence and Squarey of Salisbury, equally a leading firm of Estate Agents.

Two years later, at the age of 22, he began the management of the family's estates in Essex, but initially most of the land was let out, requiring little work. However, from 1878 upon bad harvests and a price drop in wheat, he took more direct control, switching to a system of arable and dairy farming. His improvements to the latter included the growing of lucerne (alfalfa) and other grasses as feed, increased hygiene measures, and testing for tuberculin to remove sickly cattle.

In 1884 he secured the agency for the country properties of Guy's Hospital. It had considerable properties in Essex and elsewhere besides the farms – for these Edward Strutt was responsible. He felt the need for a partner in such land agency so early in 1884 contacted friend and neighbour Charles Parker. On 21 December 1885 a deed of partnership was drawn up between the two and Strutt & Parker was created.

He founded Lord Rayleigh's Dairies Limited to process and sell milk of the managed farms to the London milk market in 1900. This was later sold in 1929 to the Express Dairy Co. Ltd

During World War I, he was involved in food and agricultural policy, serving as a member of Lord Milner's food production committee. Submarine warfare severely reduced food imports, meaning it was essential to maximise Britain's own food production. He helped frame the Corn Production Act 1917 which encouraged ploughing up pasture and replacing with crops. He served on many government committees: on post-war agriculture policy, the Royal Commission on Oxford and Cambridge universities (1920–22) and that on tariffs (import and export taxes) (1923). He served as an honorary advisor to the Board of Agriculture, and was an alderman of Essex County Council.

He pioneered or revitalised sugar-beet production in Britain.

In 1912, he became president of the Surveyors' Institution (later the RICS).

== Death ==
He died 8 March 1930 in Hatfield Peverel of a heart complaint. His assets were resworn for probate, slightly upwardly, at £181,831.9 (equivalent to about £10,300,000 in 2025). Those, undisposed, of his widow, resident at Cadogan Gardens, were less than £3,910 (equivalent to about £230,000 in 2025).

== Honours ==
He was made a Member of the Order of the Companions of Honour in 1917 for his wartime service.
