= John Archer-Houblon =

British Member of Parliament

Member of Parliament for Essex
- In office 1810–1820 Serving with Eliab Harvey, Charles Western
- Preceded by: John Bullock; Eliab Harvey
- Succeeded by: Sir Eliab Harvey; Charles Western

Personal details
- Born: John Houblon; 1 December 1773
- Died: 31 May 1831 (aged 57)
- Relations: Thomas Archer Houblon (grandson); Jacob Houblon (grandfather)
- Children: 13
- Parent(s): Jacob Houblon; Susannah Archer
- Education: Felsted School; Charterhouse School
- Alma mater: Emmanuel College, Cambridge

John Archer-Houblon (1 December 1773 – 31 May 1831) of Welford Park and Hallingbury Place was a British Member of Parliament.

== Early life ==
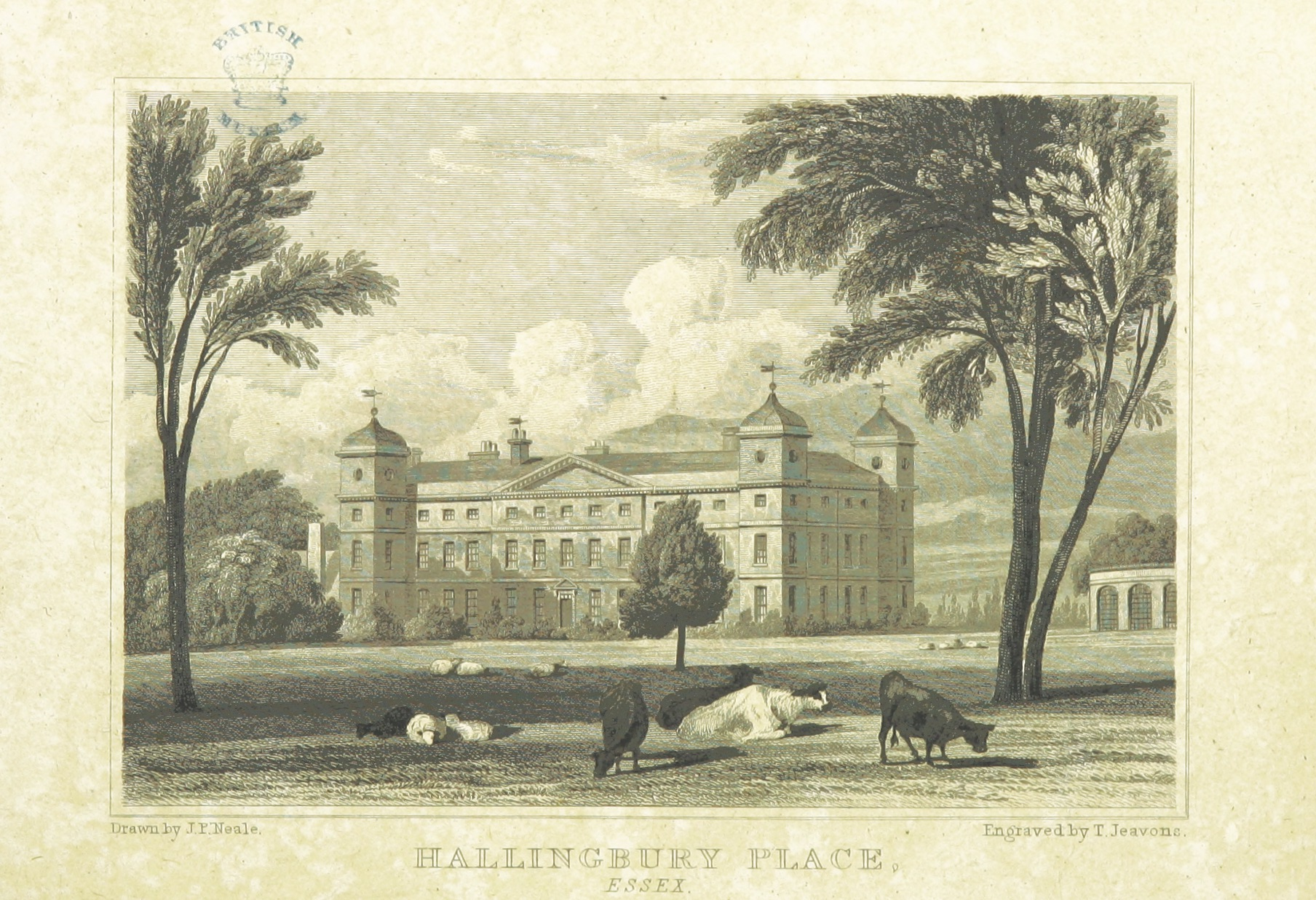
Hallingbury Place, 1818

Houblon was the eldest son of merchant Jacob Houblon and his wife Susannah Archer of Hallingbury Place in Great Hallingbury. His younger sisters were Maria Houblon (wife of Rev. Ambrose Alexander Cotton) and Letitia Houblon (wife of Frederic Louis von Feilitzsch).

His maternal grandparents were John Archer (son of William Archer, MP for Berkshire) and Lady Mary Fitzwilliam (a daughter of John Fitzwilliam, 2nd Earl Fitzwilliam, and sister to Lady Anne Fitzwilliam, the second wife of Francis Godolphin, 2nd Baron Godolphin, and William Fitzwilliam, 3rd Earl Fitzwilliam).

His paternal grandfather was Jacob Houblon, MP, and grandson of Sir John Hynde Cotton, 3rd Baronet, MP and Treasurer of the Chamber.

He was educated at Felsted School, Charterhouse School from 1784 to 1791, and Emmanuel College, Cambridge in 1791.

== Career ==
He succeeded his maternal grandfather in 1800, inheriting Welford Park, Berkshire and took the additional name of Archer by Royal Licence in 1801.

He was appointed High Sheriff of Essex, serving from 1801 to 1802 and elected a Member of Parliament for Essex in 1810, sitting until 1820.

== Personal life ==
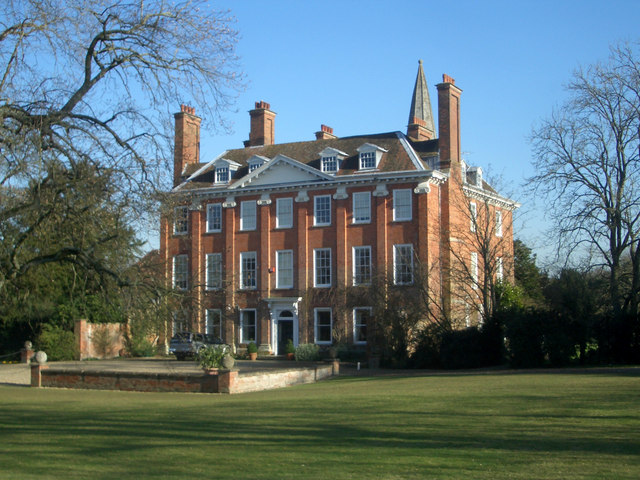
Welford Park

He married Mary Ann Bramston, the daughter of Thomas Berney Bramston of Skreens and sister of Thomas Gardiner Bramston, both MPs for Essex. Together, Mary Ann and John were the parents of ten sons and three daughters, including:

- John Archer-Houblon (1803–1891), who married Anne Whitley Deans Dundas, eldest daughter of Adm. Sir James Whitley Deans Dundas and Janet Dundas (only daughter and heir of Lord Amesbury), in 1829. After her death in 1847, he married Georgina Anne Oswald, a daughter of Gen. Sir John Oswald.
- Jacob William Houblon (1805–1819), who died young.
- Charles Archer-Houblon Eyre (1806–1886), who married Mary Anne Popham, a daughter of Gen. Leyborne Popham of Littlecote House, in 1835. After her death in 1855, he married Louisa Charlotte Randolph, a daughter of the Rev. Thomas Randolph, Rector of Much Hadham in 1858.
- Thomas Archer-Houblon (1808–1874), Rector of Catmore and Peasemore who married Eleanor Deedes, daughter of the Rev. John Deeds, Rector of Willingdale, in 1839.
- Susanna Laetitia Archer-Houblon (1810–1846)
- Mary Anne Archer-Houblon (1811–1896), who married William Forbes, eldest son of the Hon. John Hay Forbes, Lord Medwyn, in 1842.
- Harriet Archer-Houblon (1812–1896), who died unmarried.
- Richard Archer-Houblon (1814–1894), who married his cousin, Anne Maria Cotton, youngest daughter of the Rev. Alexander A. Cotton, Rector of Girton Co., in 1853.
- Frederick Archer-Houblon (1816–1891)

Archer-Houblon died on 31 May 1831.

=== Descendants ===
Through his son Thomas, he was a grandfather of the Rev. Thomas Archer Houblon, Archdeacon of Oxford.

Parliament of the United Kingdom
Preceded by John Bullock; Eliab Harvey	Member of Parliament for Essex; 1810–1820; With: Eliab Harvey, Charles Western	Succeeded by Sir Eliab Harvey; Charles Western
