= Baron Rayleigh =

Barony in the Peerage of the United Kingdom

Barony of Rayleigh
- Creation date: 1821
- First holder: Lady Charlotte Strutt
- Present holder: John Gerald Strutt, 6th Baron Rayleigh
- Heir apparent: The Hon. John Frederick Strutt
- Seat: Terling Place
- Motto: Tenax propositi (Latin for 'Tenacious of purpose')

Baron Rayleigh, of Terling Place in the County of Essex, is a title in the Peerage of the United Kingdom. It was created on 18 July 1821 for Lady Charlotte Strutt, wife of Colonel Joseph Strutt, Member of Parliament for Maldon.

Joseph Strutt had earlier declined the offer of a peerage, 'under a cloak of false humility', and instead proposed that the honour be given to his wife. She was the daughter of James FitzGerald, 1st Duke of Leinster, and his wife Lady Emily Lennox, the second of the famous Lennox sisters. Her elder brother was Charles FitzGerald, 1st Baron Lecale, and her younger brother was Lord Edward FitzGerald.

The third Baron Rayleigh, John William Strutt (1842–1919) was an eminent scientist who held the Cavendish Chair of Physics at the University of Cambridge, served as President of the Royal Society of London, and received the Nobel Prize in Physics for 1904 "for his investigations of the densities of the most important gases and for his discovery of argon in connection with these studies". The fourth Baron Rayleigh, Robert John Strutt (1875–1947) was also a distinguished scientist and a professor of physics at Imperial College London.

The title is currently held by the fourth Baron's grandson, the sixth Baron, who succeeded his uncle in 1988. The family seat is Terling Place in Essex.

== Barons Rayleigh (1821) ==
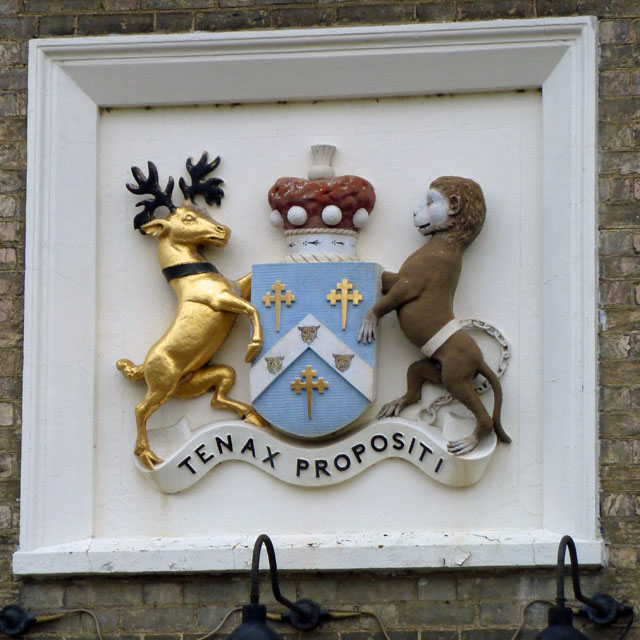
Arms of the Barons Rayleigh

- Charlotte Mary Gertrude Strutt, 1st Baroness Rayleigh (1758–1836)
- John James Strutt, 2nd Baron Rayleigh (1796–1873)
- John William Strutt, 3rd Baron Rayleigh (1842–1919)
- Robert John Strutt, 4th Baron Rayleigh (1875–1947)
- John Arthur Strutt, 5th Baron Rayleigh (1908–1988)
- John Gerald Strutt, 6th Baron Rayleigh (b. 1960)

The heir apparent is the present holder's son, the Hon. John Frederick Strutt (b. 1993).

== Extended family ==
Notable members of the Strutt family include:

- John Strutt, MP for Maldon from 1774 to 1790
- Charles Hedley Strutt, MP for Maldon and chairman of the Anglo-Dutch Plantations of Java
- Edward Gerald Strutt, son of the second Baron and founder of Strutt & Parker
- Sir Nigel Strutt, former chairman of the Strutt & Parker (Farms) Ltd
- The Hon. Hedley Vicars Strutt, former chairman of Anglo-Indonesian Plantations Ltd between 1964 and 1972

FitzGerald family tree: Earls of Kildare, Dukes of Leinster and Schomberg, Marquesses of Kildare and Barons Rayleigh

Gerald de Windsor	Nest ferch Rhys
Maurice FitzGerald c. 1105–1176; Lord of Lanstephan
Baron Offaly, 1175
Gerald FitzMaurice c. 1150–1204; 1st Lord of Offaly	Thomas FitzMaurice c. 1175–1213; Lord of O'Connelloe
Maurice FitzGerald; 1194–1257; 2nd Lord of Offaly	Earl of Desmond
Maurice FitzGerald; 3rd Lord of Offaly; 1238–c. 1286	Thomas FitzGerald d. 1271
Earl of Kildare, 1316
John FitzGerald; 1250–1316; 1st Earl of Kildare, 4th Lord of Offaly
Thomas FitzGerald d. 1328; 2nd Earl of Kildare
Richard FitzGerald; 1317–1329; 3rd Earl of Kildare	Maurice FitzGerald; 1318–1390; 4th Earl of Kildare
Gerald FitzGerald d. 1432; 5th Earl of Kildare	John FitzGerald d. 1434; 6th Earl of Kildare
Thomas FitzGerald c. 1421–1478; 7th Earl of Kildare
Gerald FitzGerald c. 1456–1513; 8th Earl of Kildare
Gerald FitzGerald; 1487–1534; 9th Earl of Kildare
Earl of Kildare (2nd creation), 1554; Ancient earldom restored, 1569
Thomas FitzGerald; 1513–1537; 10th Earl of Kildare	Gerald FitzGerald; 1525–1585; 1st & 11th Earl of Kildare	Edward FitzGerald; 1528–1590
Kildare earldom (1st creation) forfeit, 1537
King James VI & I 1566–1625	Henry FitzGerald; 1562–1597; 2nd & 12th Earl of Kildare	William FitzGerald c. 1563–1599; 3rd & 13th Earl of Kildare	Gerald FitzGerald d. 1612; 14th Earl of Kildare	Thomas FitzGerald c. 1560–1619
Elizabeth Stuart; 1596–1662	King Charles I 1600–1649	Gerald FitzGerald; 1611–1620; 15th Earl of Kildare	George FitzGerald; 1612–1660; 16th Earl of Kildare
Duke of Schomberg, Marquess of Harwich, Earl of Brentford and Baron Teyes, 1689
Charles Louis; 1617–1680; Elector Palatine	Frederick Schomberg; 1615–1690; 1st Duke of Schomberg, etc., Count of Mértola (Portugal)	King Charles II; 1630–1685	Wentworth FitzGerald; 1634–1664; 17th Earl of Kildare	Robert FitzGerald; 1638–1698
Duke of Leinster (1st creation), Earl of Bangor, Baron Tara, of Bellinter in the County of Meath, 1691
Raugravine Caroline Elisabeth; 1659–1696	Meinhardt Schomberg; 1641–1719; 3rd Duke of Schomberg, etc., Duke of Leinster, etc., Count of Mértola (Portugal)	Charles Schomberg; 1645–1693; 2nd Duke of Schomberg, etc., Count of Mértola (Portugal)	Charles Lennox; 1672–1723; Duke of Richmond	John FitzGerald; 1661–1707; 18th Earl of Kildare	Robert FitzGerald; 1675–1744; 19th Earl of Kildare
Dukedom of Leinster (1st creation) and Dukedom of Schomberg extinct, 1719
Charles Lennox; 1701–1750; Duke of Richmond
Viscount Leinster, of Taplow in the County of Buckingham, 1747; Marquess of Kildare and Earl of Offaly, 1761; Duke of Leinster (2nd creation), 1766
Emily Lennox; 1731–1814	James FitzGerald; 1722–1773; 1st Duke of Leinster, etc., 20th Earl of Kildare
Baron Lecale	Baron Rayleigh
George FitzGerald; 1748–1765 styled Earl of Offaly	William Robert FitzGerald; 1749–1804; 2nd Duke of Leinster, etc., 21st Earl of Kildare	Charles James FitzGerald; 1756–1810; Baron Lecale	Charlotte Strutt; 1758–1836; 1st Baroness Rayleigh
Lecale barony extinct, 1810
George FitzGerald; 1783–1784 styled Marquess of Kildare	Augustus Frederick FitzGerald; 1791–1874; 3rd Duke of Leinster, etc., 22nd Earl of Kildare	John James Strutt; 1796–1873; 2nd Baron Rayleigh
Baron Kildare, 1870
Charles William FitzGerald; 1819–1887; 4th Duke of Leinster, etc., 23rd Earl of Kildare, 1st Baron Kildare
Gerald FitzGerald; 1851–1893; 5th Duke of Leinster, etc., 24th Earl of Kildare, 2nd Baron Kildare	John William Strutt; 1842–1919; 3rd Baron Rayleigh
Maurice FitzGerald; 1887–1922; 6th Duke of Leinster, etc., 25th Earl of Kildare, 3rd Baron Kildare	Desmond FitzGerald; 1888–1916	Edward FitzGerald; 1892–1976; 7th Duke of Leinster, etc., 26th Earl of Kildare, 4th Baron Kildare	Robert John Strutt; 1875–1947; 4th Baron Rayleigh
Gerald FitzGerald; 1914–2004; 8th Duke of Leinster, etc., 27th Earl of Kildare, 5th Baron Kildare	John Arthur Strutt; 1908–1988; 5th Baron Rayleigh
Maurice FitzGerald b. 1948; 9th Duke of Leinster, etc., 28th Earl of Kildare, 6th Baron Kildare	John FitzGerald; 1952–2015	John Gerald Strutt b. 1960; 6th Baron Rayleigh
Thomas FitzGerald; 1974–1997 styled Earl of Offaly	Edward FitzGerald b. 1988	John Frederick Strutt b. 1993
Heir presumptive to the Leinster dukedom	Heir apparent to the Barony Rayleigh

== See also ==
- Duke of Leinster
- Strutt baronets
