= Robert Strutt, 4th Baron Rayleigh =

British physicist (1875–1947)

The Right Honourable The Lord Rayleigh FRS
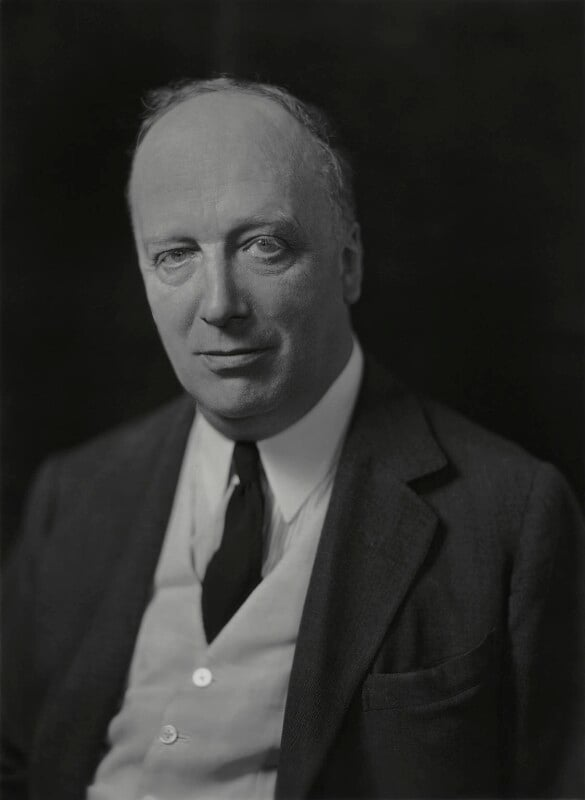
- Rayleigh in 1934
- Born: 28 August 1875; Essex, England
- Died: 13 December 1947 (aged 72)
- Education: Trinity College, Cambridge
- Known for: Rayleigh; Rayleigh scattering
- Spouses: Lady Mary Hilda Clements (m. 1905; died 1919) Kathleen Alice Coppin-Straker (m. 1920)
- Children: 6
- Awards: Bakerian Medal (1911, 1919); FRS (1905)
- Scientific career
- Fields: Experimental physics Chemical physics
- Workplaces: Imperial College London

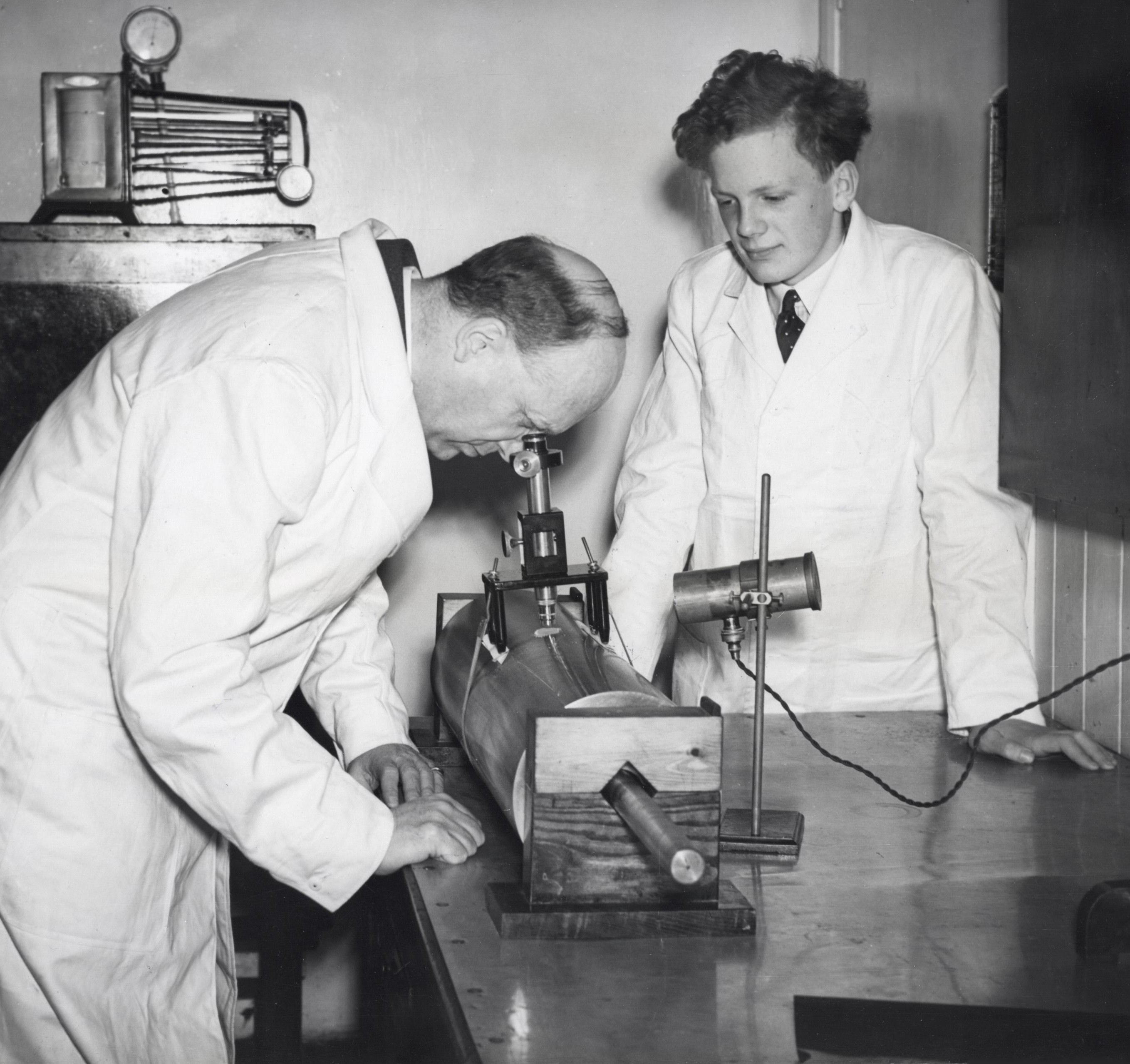
Strutt with his son Guy in 1938

Robert John Strutt, 4th Baron Rayleigh FRS (28 August 1875 – 13 December 1947) was a British peer and physicist. He discovered "active nitrogen" and was the first to distinguish the glow of the night sky.

== Early life and education ==
Strutt was born at Terling Place, the family home near Witham, Essex, the eldest son of John William Strutt, 3rd Baron Rayleigh and his wife Evelyn Georgiana Mary (née Balfour). He was thus a nephew of Arthur Balfour and of Eleanor Mildred Sidgwick. He was educated at Eton College and Trinity College, Cambridge, where he initially read mathematics, but changed after two terms to Natural Sciences. He became a research student in physics at the Cavendish Laboratory under J. J. Thomson, whose biography he subsequently wrote. His work at this time was on discharge of electricity through gases, including early work on x-rays and electrons. He wrote one of the first books on radioactivity, The Becquerel rays and the properties of radium (E. Arnold, 1904). He was awarded the Coutts Trotter studentship in 1898 and was a Fellow of Trinity College 1900–1906. He received his M.A. in 1901.

== Career ==
Strutt was elected a Fellow of the Royal Society in May 1905 when his candidature citation read:

Fellow of Trinity College, Cambridge. As one who has made discoveries in Physics and as the author of the following papers: – 'On the Least Potential Difference required to Produce Discharge through Various Gases' (Phil Trans, vol cxciii, 1893); 'The Dispersion of the Cathode Rays by Magnetic Gases' (Phil Mag,, Nov 1899); 'The Discharge of Electricity through Argon and helium' (ibid, March 1900); 'The Behaviour of Becquerel and Rontgen Rays in a Magnetic Field' (Proc Roy Soc, vol lxvi); 'The Conductivity of Gases under Becquerel Rays' (Phil Trans, vol cxcvi, 1901); 'The Tendency of the Atomic Weights to Approximate to Whole Numbers' (Phil Mag,, March 1901); 'The Discharge of Positive Electrification by Hot Metals' (ibid, July 1902); 'Electrical Conductivity of Metals and their Vapours' (ibid, Nov 1902); 'Some Recent Investigations on Electrical Conduction' (Proc Roy Inst, April 1903); 'Preparation and Properties of an Intensely Radio-active Gas from Metallic Mercury' (Phil Mag, July 1903); 'Radio-activity of Ordinary Materials' (ibid, June 1903); 'Absorption of Light by Mercury and its Vapour' (ibid, July 1903); 'The Intensely Penetrating Rays of radium' (Proc Roy Soc, lxxii); 'Fluorescence of Crystals under Rontgen Rays' (Phil Mag, Aug 1903); 'An Experiment to Exhibit the Loss of Negative Electricity by Radium' (ibid, Nov 1903).

He delivered their Bakerian Lecture in 1911 and 1919. He was president of the British Association for the year 1937–1938.

Strutt's best known work in the period 1904–1910 was the estimation of the age of minerals and rocks by measurement of their radium and helium content. In 1908 he was appointed Professor of Physics at Imperial College, London where he followed up his father's work on light scattering, which is now known as Rayleigh scattering, resulting in some papers published in the Proceedings of the Royal Society. He published a biography of his father, the third Baron Rayleigh, with the title of "Life of John William Strutt, third Baron Rayleigh". Photographs of Robert John Strutt when he was young can be found in this book. Both the father and son's work on light scattering was discussed by Young in 1982. A sketch of Robert John Strutt when he was old can also be found in Young (1982). (Please see reference.)

In 1910, Strutt discovered that an electrical discharge in nitrogen gas produced "active nitrogen", an allotrope considered to be monatomic. The "whirling cloud of brilliant yellow light" produced by his apparatus reacted with quicksilver to produce explosive mercury nitride.

In 1916, working with his colleague Alfred Fowler, Strutt was the first to prove the existence of ozone in the atmosphere by examining the ultra-violet spectrum of the setting sun. Strutt proved that the ozone was mainly located in the upper atmosphere, in what is now called the ozone layer.

Following the death of his father in 1919, Strutt resigned his chair at Imperial College but continued to experiment at home in the private laboratory that his father had established in an old stable block. His earlier work on gaseous discharge and fluorescence, led to further work on the luminosity of the night sky. He was the first to differentiate between two types of light from the night sky, the aurora or "northern lights", and the airglow that prevents the sky ever being completely dark anywhere on earth. In 1929 he was the first to measure the intensity of the light from the night sky. This work led to his posthumous nickname "the Airglow Rayleigh". The importance of his unpublished data was such that the US Airforce Cambridge Research Laboratories acquired it in 1963, almost by accident, at the same time of many of his father's experimental notebooks. They are now housed in the McDermott Library of the US Air Force Academy, Colorado Springs, Colorado.

The rayleigh, a unit of photon flux used to measure airglow, is named after him. A special issue of Applied Optics published in 1964 is devoted to the 3rd and 4th Barons Rayleigh.

== Personal life ==
Strutt inherited his title on the death of his father in 1919, becoming the 4th Baron Rayleigh. He had married twice: firstly on 5 July 1905 Lady Mary Hilda Clements, daughter of Robert Clements, 4th Earl of Leitrim (she died 1919), and secondly, in 1920, Kathleen Alice, daughter of John Coppin-Straker of Northumberland. He had five children (including one who died in childhood) by his first wife, including his heir John Arthur Strutt, 5th Baron Rayleigh and the Hon. Charles Strutt; he had a sixth child by his second wife.

- Violet Blanche Strutt (1906–1910)
- John Arthur Strutt, 5th Baron Rayleigh (1908–1988); married Ursula Brocklebank, no issue
- Hon. Charles Richard Strutt (1910–1981); married Hon. Jean Elizabeth Davidson (daughter of J. C. C. Davidson, 1st Viscount Davidson and Frances Davidson, Viscountess Davidson, herself the daughter of Willoughby Dickinson, 1st Baron Dickinson). Their only son John Gerald Strutt is the 6th Baron (current holder).
- Hon. Daphne Strutt (1911–2003); notably converted to Roman Catholicism after marrying John Lyon-Dalberg-Acton, 3rd Baron Acton, 11 children including the 4th Baron Acton
- Hon. Hedley Vicars Strutt (1915–2012); served in World War II with the Scots Guards
- Hon. Guy Robert Strutt (1921–2007)

He died in Terling, Essex.

== See also ==
- Labradorite

Peerage of the United Kingdom
Preceded by John Strutt	Baron Rayleigh; 1919–1947	Succeeded by John Strutt
