= Listed buildings in Terling =

Civil Parish in Essex, England

Terling is a village and civil parish in the Braintree District of Essex, England. It contains 75 listed buildings that are recorded in the National Heritage List for England. Of these one is grade I, nine are grade II* and 65 are grade II.

This list is based on the information retrieved online from Historic England.

== Key ==
Grade	Criteria
I	Buildings that are of exceptional interest
II*	Particularly important buildings of more than special interest
II	Buildings that are of special interest

== Listing ==
Name	Grade	Location	Type	Completed (Note: The date given is the date used by Historic England as significant for the initial building or that of an important part in the structure's description.)	Date designated	Grid ref. (Note: The grid reference is based on the British national grid reference system, sometimes known as OSGB36, used by the Ordnance Survey.) Geo-coordinates	Notes	Entry number (Note: The "List Entry Number" is a unique number assigned to each listed building and scheduled monument by Historic England.)	Image	Wikidata
Norrells Cottages	II	1 and 2			13 March 1986	TL7665814364; 51°48′00″N 0°33′38″E		1337835	Upload Photo	Q26622203
Barn Approximately 5 Metres South-east of Ringers Farmhouse	II				13 March 1986	TL7619413338; 51°47′27″N 0°33′12″E		1337836	Upload Photo	Q26622204
Barn of Noake's Farm	II				18 March 1985	TL7450213979; 51°47′50″N 0°31′45″E		1123405	Upload Photo	Q26416507
Ringers Farmhouse	I				2 May 1953	TL7617113334; 51°47′27″N 0°33′11″E		1123406	Upload Photo	Q17535902
Barn Approximately 15 Metres North-north-east of Wasses Farmhouse	II	Braintree Road			21 October 1982	TL7609315714; 51°48′44″N 0°33′11″E		1123409	Upload Photo	Q26416509
Byre Approximately 25 Metres East of Wasses Farmhouse	II	Braintree Road			21 October 1982	TL7612115681; 51°48′43″N 0°33′13″E		1147294	Upload Photo	Q26440353
Oak Lodge	II	Braintree Road			13 March 1986	TL7612015720; 51°48′45″N 0°33′13″E		1147277	Upload Photo	Q26440337
Ridley Hall	II	Braintree Road			13 March 1986	TL7559815362; 51°48′34″N 0°32′45″E		1337837	Upload Photo	Q26622205
Three Ashes Farmhouse	II	Braintree Road			13 March 1986	TL7577816007; 51°48′54″N 0°32′55″E		1123408	Upload Photo	Q26416508
Wasses Farmhouse	II	Braintree Road			21 October 1982	TL7608815689; 51°48′44″N 0°33′11″E		1147288	Upload Photo	Q26440348
Terling Place	II*	Chelmsford, CM3 2PJ	house		2 May 1953	TL7736714625; 51°48′08″N 0°34′16″E		1123407	Terling Place More images	Q16248343
Bromwell Leaze	II	Church Green			13 March 1986	TL7721414835; 51°48′15″N 0°34′08″E		1337838	Upload Photo	Q26622206
Granary Approximately 5 Metres West of Tudor House	II	Church Green			13 March 1986	TL7730314875; 51°48′16″N 0°34′13″E		1308558	Upload Photo	Q26595146
Parish Church of All Saints	II*	Church Green	church building		13 March 1986	TL7731614817; 51°48′14″N 0°34′13″E		1123411	Parish Church of All Saints More images	Q17557323
Rose Cottage	II	Church Green			13 March 1986	TL7724314850; 51°48′15″N 0°34′10″E		1147297	Upload Photo	Q26440355
Tudor House	II*	Church Green	house		13 March 1986	TL7732514872; 51°48′16″N 0°34′14″E		1147379	Tudor House More images	Q17557488
United Reformed Church	II*	Church Green	church building		13 March 1986	TL7724914867; 51°48′16″N 0°34′10″E		1123410	United Reformed Church More images	Q17557319
Vine Cottage and Church View	II*	Church Green			13 March 1986	TL7727314878; 51°48′16″N 0°34′11″E		1308572	Upload Photo	Q17557765
Wall Approximately 8 Metres South-west and 5 Metres South-east of the Tudor House	II	Church Green			13 March 1986	TL7732014860; 51°48′15″N 0°34′14″E		1123414	Upload Photo	Q26416512
Wall Extending Approximately 65 Metres South-west from the West Corner of All Saints Churchyard	II	Church Green			13 March 1986	TL7726614797; 51°48′13″N 0°34′11″E		1123412	Upload Photo	Q26416510
Wall Forming South-west and South-east Boundary of All Saints Churchyard	II	Church Green			13 March 1986	TL7732114780; 51°48′13″N 0°34′14″E		1123413	Upload Photo	Q26416511
Wood Monument Approximatley 30 Metres North-east of All Saints Church	II	Church Green			13 March 1986	TL7734414844; 51°48′15″N 0°34′15″E		1147373	Upload Photo	Q26440419
Mill Dam Forming Road Bridge Over River Ter and Associated Wheel Chamber and Water Pump to the South	II	Church Road			13 March 1986	TL7711114699; 51°48′10″N 0°34′02″E		1123415	Upload Photo	Q26416513
Terling War Memorial	II	Church Road, Chelmsford, CM3 2PQ	war memorial		28 January 2019	TL7727014851; 51°48′15″N 0°34′11″E		1460050	Terling War Memorial More images	Q66479955
Braybrook	II	Crow Pond Road			13 March 1986	TL7733414972; 51°48′19″N 0°34′15″E		1123416	Upload Photo	Q26416514
Terling Stores and Post Office	II*	Crow Pond Road	post office		13 March 1986	TL7732714960; 51°48′19″N 0°34′14″E		1147405	Terling Stores and Post Office More images	Q17557495
Dancing Dicks Farmhouse	II	Dancing Dicks Lane			13 March 1986	TL7940013924; 51°47′43″N 0°36′00″E		1308692	Upload Photo	Q26595267
Barn 70 Metres South of Great Loyes Farmhouse	II	Fairstead Road			13 March 1986	TL7741415808; 51°48′46″N 0°34′20″E		1337839	Upload Photo	Q26622207
Great Loyes Farmhouse	II	Fairstead Road			13 March 1986	TL7741815894; 51°48′49″N 0°34′21″E		1147418	Upload Photo	Q26440453
New House	II	Flack's Green			13 March 1986	TL7654514706; 51°48′11″N 0°33′33″E		1337800	Upload Photo	Q26622177
The Coffee House	II	Flack's Green			9 May 1979	TL7640614641; 51°48′09″N 0°33′26″E		1147423	Upload Photo	Q26440457
The Maltings	II	Flack's Green			13 March 1986	TL7641814598; 51°48′08″N 0°33′26″E		1123417	Upload Photo	Q26416515
Marchants	II	Gambles Green			13 March 1986	TL7626814783; 51°48′14″N 0°33′19″E		1123418	Upload Photo	Q26416516
The White House	II	Gambles Green			13 March 1986	TL7629214785; 51°48′14″N 0°33′20″E		1147439	Upload Photo	Q26440472
Unnamed Pair of Cottages at West Corner of Green	II	Gambles Green			13 March 1986	TL7623614734; 51°48′12″N 0°33′17″E		1308538	Upload Photo	Q26595130
The Windmill	II	Mill Lane	windmill		13 March 1986	TL7643115010; 51°48′21″N 0°33′28″E		1123419	The Windmill More images	Q7702530
Terling Church of England (aided) Primary School and Adjacent House to East	II	New Road			13 March 1986	TL7717315104; 51°48′23″N 0°34′06″E		1308511	Upload Photo	Q26595107
Kendalls	II*	Norman Hill			13 March 1986	TL7664014915; 51°48′18″N 0°33′38″E		1337801	Upload Photo	Q17557841
The Old Rectory	II	Norman Hill			13 March 1986	TL7662414873; 51°48′17″N 0°33′37″E		1308514	Upload Photo	Q26595110
Unnamed Cottage Opposite Bramley Cottages 60 Metres East of Kendalls	II	Norman Hill			13 March 1986	TL7671114907; 51°48′18″N 0°33′42″E		1123420	Upload Photo	Q26416518
River Hill Cottages	II	1, Owls Hill			13 March 1986	TL7686515138; 51°48′25″N 0°33′50″E		1123384	Upload Photo	Q26416488
River Hill Cottage	II	2, Owls Hill			13 March 1986	TL7685915142; 51°48′25″N 0°33′50″E		1147486	Upload Photo	Q26440509
River Hill Cottages	II	3, Owls Hill			13 March 1986	TL7685715149; 51°48′25″N 0°33′50″E		1337823	Upload Photo	Q26685054
Leylands Farmhouse	II	Owls Hill			13 March 1986	TL7509414872; 51°48′18″N 0°32′18″E		1337825	Upload Photo	Q26622195
Owls Hall	II	Owls Hill			13 March 1986	TL7706715045; 51°48′22″N 0°34′01″E		1123385	Upload Photo	Q26416489
Owls Hill Cottage	II	Owls Hill			13 March 1986	TL7696415104; 51°48′24″N 0°33′56″E		1337802	Upload Photo	Q26622178
Owls Hill House	II*	Owls Hill			13 March 1986	TL7697315077; 51°48′23″N 0°33′56″E		1337824	Upload Photo	Q17557856
Raisings House	II	Owls Hill			13 March 1986	TL7696315085; 51°48′23″N 0°33′55″E		1308525	Upload Photo	Q26595120
Rose Cottage	II	Owls Hill			13 March 1986	TL7694615088; 51°48′23″N 0°33′55″E		1147489	Upload Photo	Q26440511
The Old Vicarage	II*	Owls Hill	clergy house		13 March 1986	TL7702315050; 51°48′22″N 0°33′59″E		1308470	The Old Vicarage More images	Q17557762
Unnamed Cottage 35 Metres North of Raising House	II	Owls Hill			13 March 1986	TL7696715123; 51°48′24″N 0°33′56″E		1147476	Upload Photo	Q26440501
Complete Complex of Farm Buildings East of Sparrow's Farmhouse Excluding the Barn, Listed Separately As Item 5/152	II	Listed Separately As Item 5/152, Sparrows Farm Road			13 March 1986	TL7544414529; 51°48′07″N 0°32′35″E		1123387	Upload Photo	Q26416491
Barn Approximately 30 Metres East of Sparrows Farmhouse	II	Sparrows Farm Road			13 March 1986	TL7545114506; 51°48′06″N 0°32′36″E		1308478	Upload Photo	Q26595077
Barn Approximately 30 Metres North West of Rolls Farmhouse	II	Sparrows Farm Road			13 March 1986	TL7589514094; 51°47′52″N 0°32′58″E		1123388	Upload Photo	Q26416492
Barn and Stable Range Approximatley 15 Metres North of Leylands Farmhouse	II	Sparrows Farm Road			13 March 1986	TL7509714925; 51°48′20″N 0°32′18″E		1308474	Upload Photo	Q26595073
Little Russells	II	Sparrows Farm Road			13 March 1986	TL7535114503; 51°48′06″N 0°32′30″E		1337826	Upload Photo	Q26622196
Rolls Farmhouse	II	Sparrows Farm Road			13 March 1986	TL7589214064; 51°47′51″N 0°32′58″E		1147574	Upload Photo	Q26440591
Scarletts Farmhouse	II	Sparrows Farm Road			13 March 1986	TL7458914415; 51°48′04″N 0°31′50″E		1147570	Upload Photo	Q26440587
Sparrows Farmhouse	II	Sparrows Farm Road			13 March 1986	TL7539714521; 51°48′07″N 0°32′33″E		1123386	Upload Photo	Q26416490
Cartlodge Approximately 80 Metres West-south-west of Terling Hall	II	Terling Hall Road			15 July 1983	TL7708713418; 51°47′29″N 0°33′59″E		1147613	Upload Photo	Q26440627
Granary/cartlodge Approximatley 90 Metres West-north-west of Terling Hall Farmhouse	II	Terling Hall Road			15 July 1983	TL7708113477; 51°47′31″N 0°33′59″E		1123392	Upload Photo	Q26416496
Maddocks Hall	II	Terling Hall Road			13 March 1986	TL7767113553; 51°47′33″N 0°34′30″E		1147637	Upload Photo	Q26440648
25 and 27, the Street	II	25 and 27, The Street			13 March 1986	TL7729414955; 51°48′18″N 0°34′12″E		1123389	Upload Photo	Q26416493
Block of 3 Cottages 15 Metres South-east of Terling Stores and Post Office	II	The Street			13 March 1986	TL7734014937; 51°48′18″N 0°34′15″E		1337827	Upload Photo	Q26622197
Butlers Lodge	II	The Street			13 March 1986	TL7734714929; 51°48′18″N 0°34′15″E		1147587	Upload Photo	Q26440601
No 26 and Adjacent House to South-east Probably No 24	II	The Street			13 March 1986	TL7729814973; 51°48′19″N 0°34′13″E		1308447	Upload Photo	Q26595049
Pair of Cottages 20 Metres South of Terling Stores and Post Office	II	The Street			13 March 1986	TL7732714929; 51°48′18″N 0°34′14″E		1147595	Upload Photo	Q26440609
Terling Hall Farmhouse	II	The Street			2 May 1953	TL7718713432; 51°47′29″N 0°34′04″E		1123391	Upload Photo	Q26416495
The Manse	II	The Street			13 March 1986	TL7731114947; 51°48′18″N 0°34′13″E		1123390	Upload Photo	Q26416494
Wat Hobbs Farmhouse	II	Wat Hobbs Lane			13 March 1986	TL7595214912; 51°48′19″N 0°33′02″E		1123393	Upload Photo	Q26416497
Barn Approximately 15 Metres South South West of Farding's Farmhouse	II	Witham Road			13 March 1986	TL7853814692; 51°48′09″N 0°35′17″E		1248835	Upload Photo	Q26541023
Barn Approximately 15 Metres South-south-east of Farding's Farmhouse	II	Witham Road			13 March 1986	TL7855114693; 51°48′09″N 0°35′18″E		1123394	Upload Photo	Q26416498
Barn Approximately 40 Metres North of Taylors Farm Cottages	II	Witham Road			13 March 1986	TL7846714387; 51°47′59″N 0°35′13″E		1147654	Upload Photo	Q26440663
Fardings Farmhouse	II	Witham Road			13 March 1986	TL7853814722; 51°48′09″N 0°35′17″E		1147646	Upload Photo	Q26440657
Taylors Farm Cottages	II	Witham Road			13 March 1986	TL7846614347; 51°47′57″N 0°35′12″E		1123395	Upload Photo	Q26416499

== See also ==
- Grade I listed buildings in Essex
- Grade II* listed buildings in Essex

== Sources ==
- Bettley, James; Pevsner, Nikolaus (2007) [1954], Essex, The Buildings of England, New Haven and London: Yale University Press, ISBN 978-0-300-11614-4
