= John Strutt (1727–1816) =

British politician

John Strutt (/strʌt/; 1727 – 8 March 1816) was a British politician who sat in the House of Commons from 1774 to 1790.

Strutt was the only son of Joseph Strutt of Moulsham Mill House, Essex and his wife, Mary, daughter of Robert Young of Little Dunmow. He was baptised in November 1727 at Chelmsford. He was educated at Felsted School from 1740 to 1744. His father was a miller and he was apprenticed to another miller, John Strutt of Maldon (no known relation).

He married Anne Goodday, daughter of Rev. William Goodday, rector of Strelley, Nottinghamshire on 27 July 1756. In 1758, he inherited property at Terling on the death of an uncle. He purchased the manor of Terling from Sir Matthew Fetherstonhaugh and the adjacent estate in 1761 and built Terling Place from 1772.

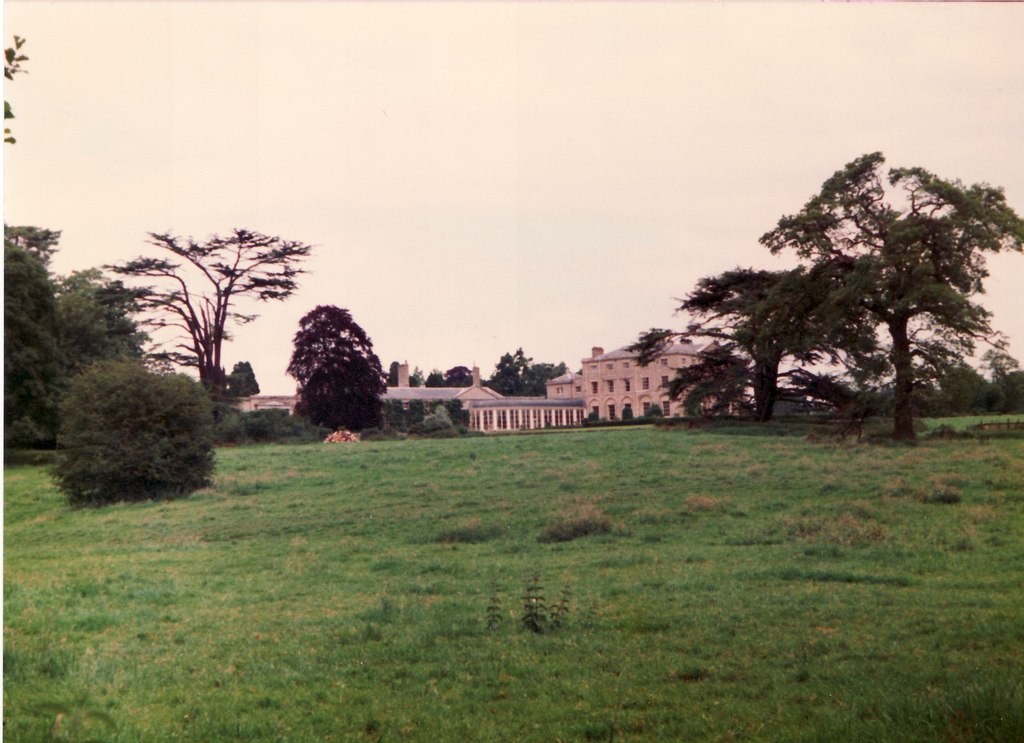
Terling Place

His sister, Elizabeth, married Foote Gower, of Chelmsford. He was elected a Fellow of his college in 1750.

== Death ==
Strutt died on 8 March 1816. He and his wife Anne were parents of three sons (including Joseph Holden Strutt and William Goodday Strutt) and a daughter.

== Political career ==
Strutt was for a long time averse to standing for Parliament though he had effective ascendancy over the Maldon constituency from the 1750s to 1807, which he used to elect his friends. He was returned as Member of Parliament for Maldon at the 1774 general election after a contest. He was returned again unopposed in 1780 and 1784. In 1790 he gave up his seat, which was subsequently contested by his son, Joseph Holden.

In the House Strutt was a convinced and steady Government supporter. He achieved prominence by being on 12 Feb. 1779 the only Member to vote against thanking Admiral Keppel for his services, ‘for which he was much reviled’.

=== Honours ===
On 30 Nov. Bamber Gascoyne wrote to him: "As soon as the election is over you will kiss the King’s hand. Sir John is the word and your patent will be made for baronetage at the general election." But there is no evidence of Strutt having wished for honours (that he was no snob is shown by his first, somewhat negative, reaction, in 1788, to his son's engagement to a daughter of the Duke of Leinster).

Parliament of the United Kingdom
Preceded by Colonel John Bullock; Charles Rainsford	Member of Parliament for Maldon; 1774–1790; With: Richard Savage Nassau 1774–1780; Eliab Harvey 1780–1784; Drigue Olmius, 2nd Baron Waltham 1784–1787; Sir Peter Parker, 1st Baronet 1787–1790	Succeeded by Joseph Holden Strutt; Charles Callis Western
