= Charles Western, 1st Baron Western =

British politician

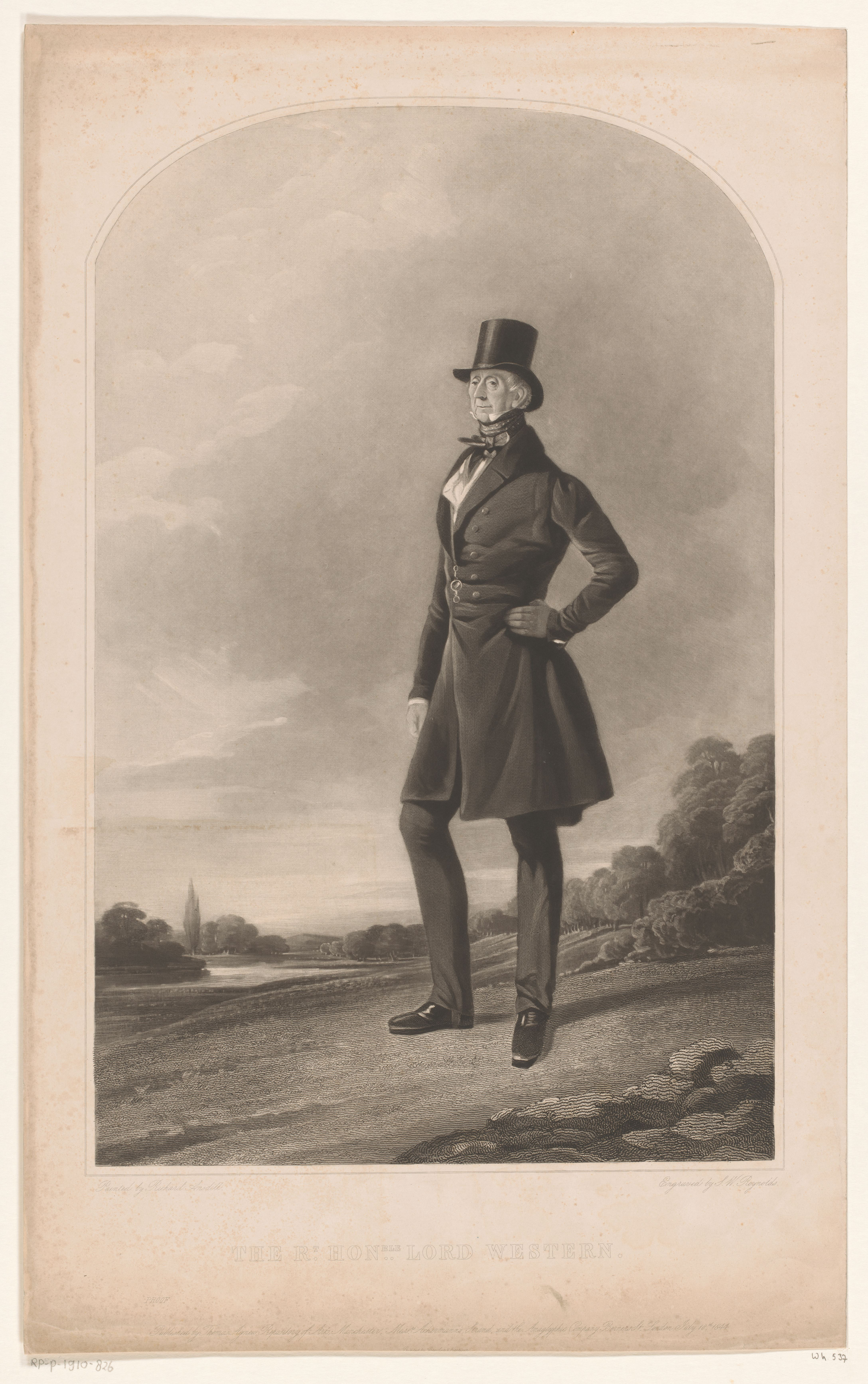
The Right Honorable Lord Western

Charles Callis Western, 1st Baron Western (9 August 1767 – 4 November 1844), was a British landowner and Whig politician. He sat in the House of Commons for over forty years before his elevation to the peerage in 1833.

== Background and education ==
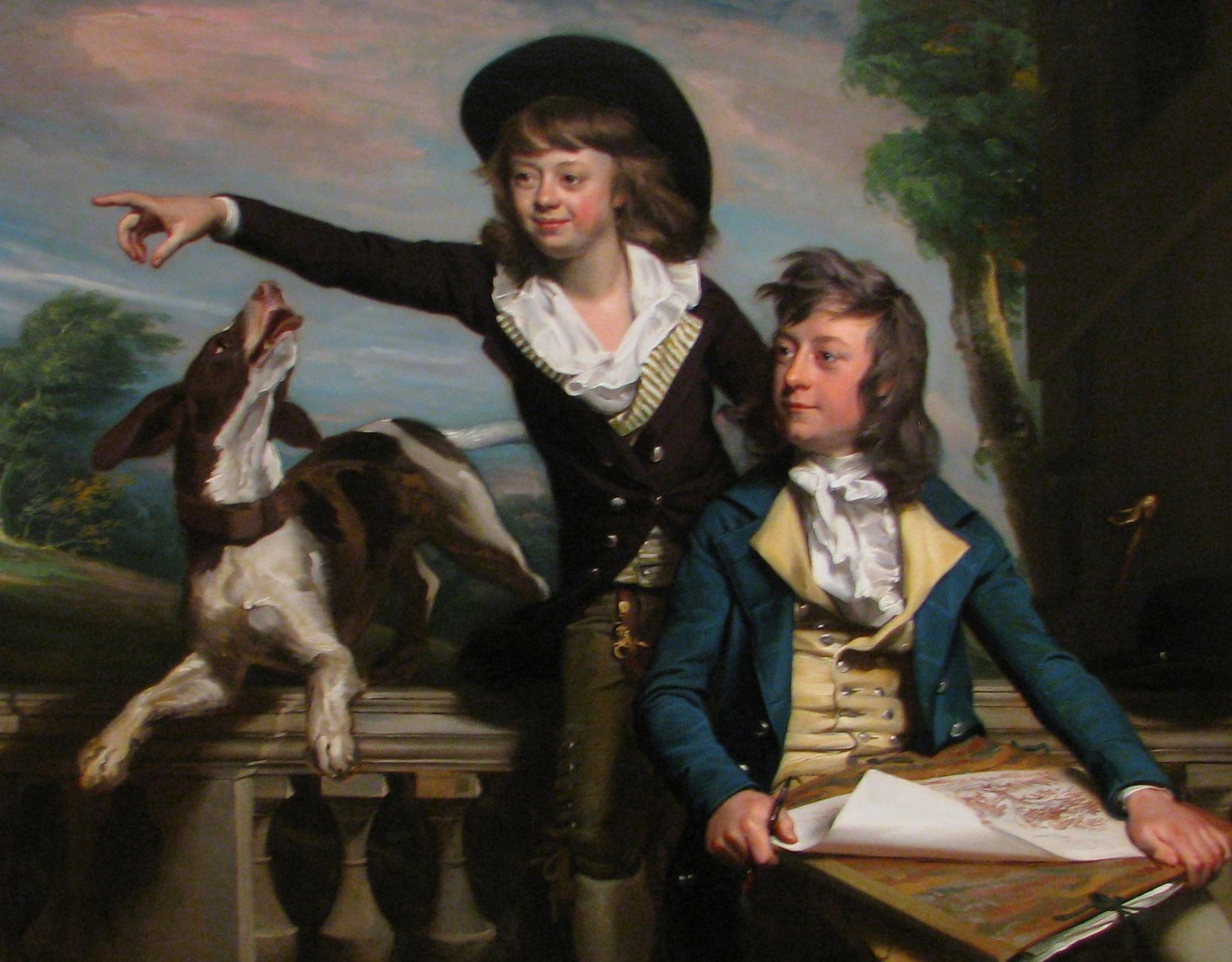
The Western Brothers by John Singleton Copley (1783) Charles (right) and his brother Shirley

Born at the family seat of Rivenhall Place in Essex, Western was the son of Charles Western and Frances Shirley, daughter and heiress of William Bolland. His father was killed in a chaise accident when Western was four-years-old, in which he was also present. He was educated at Newcombe's School in Hackney, Eton and Queens' College, Cambridge. When coming of age in 1788, he inherited Rivenhall Place, which had been in the Western family since the second half of the 17th century and commissioned Humphrey Repton to give the Tudor house a new facade. However, two years later he left Rivenhall to his uncle and purchased Felix Hall in Kelvedon.

== Political career ==
Western was returned to parliament as one of two representatives for Maldon in 1790, a seat he held until 1806, when he was defeated by Benjamin Gaskell. However, Gaskell was unseated on petition the following year and Western was elected in his place. He continued to represent the constituency until 1812. The latter year he was returned for Essex, a seat he held until the constituency was abolished in the Reform Act 1832. In Parliament he was a supporter of agricultural and electoral reform. He lost his seat at the 1832 general election but the following year he was elevated to the peerage as Baron Western, of Rivenhall in the County of Essex.

== Personal life ==
Lord Western never married and the title became extinct on his death at Felix Hall in November 1844, aged 77. He entailed his estates to his cousin Thomas Western, who was created a Baronet of Rivenhall in 1864.

Parliament of Great Britain
Preceded by John Strutt; Sir Peter Parker, Bt	Member of Parliament for Maldon; 1790–1801; With: Joseph Strutt	Succeeded by Parliament of the United Kingdom
Parliament of the United Kingdom
Preceded by Parliament of Great Britain	Member of Parliament for Maldon; 1801–1806; With: Joseph Strutt	Succeeded by Joseph Strutt; Benjamin Gaskell
Preceded by Joseph Strutt; Benjamin Gaskell	Member of Parliament for Maldon; 1807–1812; With: Joseph Strutt	Succeeded by Joseph Strutt; Benjamin Gaskell
Preceded by Sir Eliab Harvey; John Archer-Houblon	Member of Parliament for Essex; 1812–1832; With: John Archer-Houblon 1812–1820; Sir Eliab Harvey 1820–1830; Thomas Gardiner Bramston 1830; Sir John Tyrell, Bt 1830–1831; Hon. William Pole-Tylney-Long-Wellesley 1831–1832	Constituency abollisshed
Peerage of the United Kingdom
New creation	Baron Western; 1833–1844	Extinct
