= Principle of similitude =

The principle of similitude is a supplement to the scientific method advocated by John Strutt (Lord Rayleigh) (1842–1919) that requires that any suggested scientific law be examined for its relationship to similar laws.

The principle of similitude is very often used in scientific studies. For example, the study of blood flow known as hemodynamics. This study sometimes require the modeling of blood vessels in vitro. Here, the principle of similitude plays a huge role in ensuring the conditions of the model reproduces all aspects of behavior as the blood vessel in study.

Various techniques are implemented when applying the principle of similitude. A well known technique is dimensional analysis.
