= John Luther (MP) =

English politician

John Luther (c. 1739–1786) was an English politician.

== Life ==
The son of Richard Luther of Ongar, Essex, he was educated at Newcome's School in Hackney, and Trinity College, Cambridge, where he matriculated in 1756, graduating B.A. and M.A. in 1761. He had entered the Middle Temple to study law in 1755.

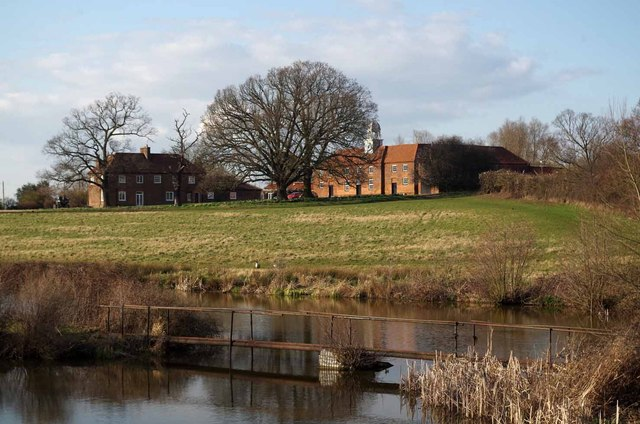
Great Myles today

He was elected a member of the Parliament of Great Britain for Essex from 13 December 1763 to 1784. A Whig, he left his wife in 1764 and went to Paris at the time when the government was pursuing John Wilkes. Richard Watson persuaded him to return and be reconciled with his wife and family.

The family lived at Great Myles house in Kelvedon Hatch, near Ongar, Essex.

== Family ==
On 20 January 1762 Luther had obtained a licence to marry Levina Alexander Bennet, daughter of Bennet Alexander Bennet (1702–1745) and his wife Mary Ash (born 1719), who married again in 1747 to Richard Bull. Levina's brother was Richard Henry Alexander Bennet.

His nephew Francis Fane of Spettisbury (1752–1813), was MP for Lyme Regis and Dorset and inherited Luther's Ongar estate.

Luther left an estate at Petworth, Sussex to Bishop Watson.

Parliament of Great Britain
Preceded by William Harvey; Sir William Maynard	Member of Parliament for Essex; 1763–1784; With: Sir William Maynard 1763–1772; John Conyers (1717–1775) 1772–1775; William Harvey 1775–1779; Thomas Berney Bramston 1779–1784	Succeeded by Colonel John Bullock; Thomas Berney Bramston
