= Eliab Harvey =

Royal Navy officer and politician (1758–1830)

Admiral Sir Eliab Harvey GCB
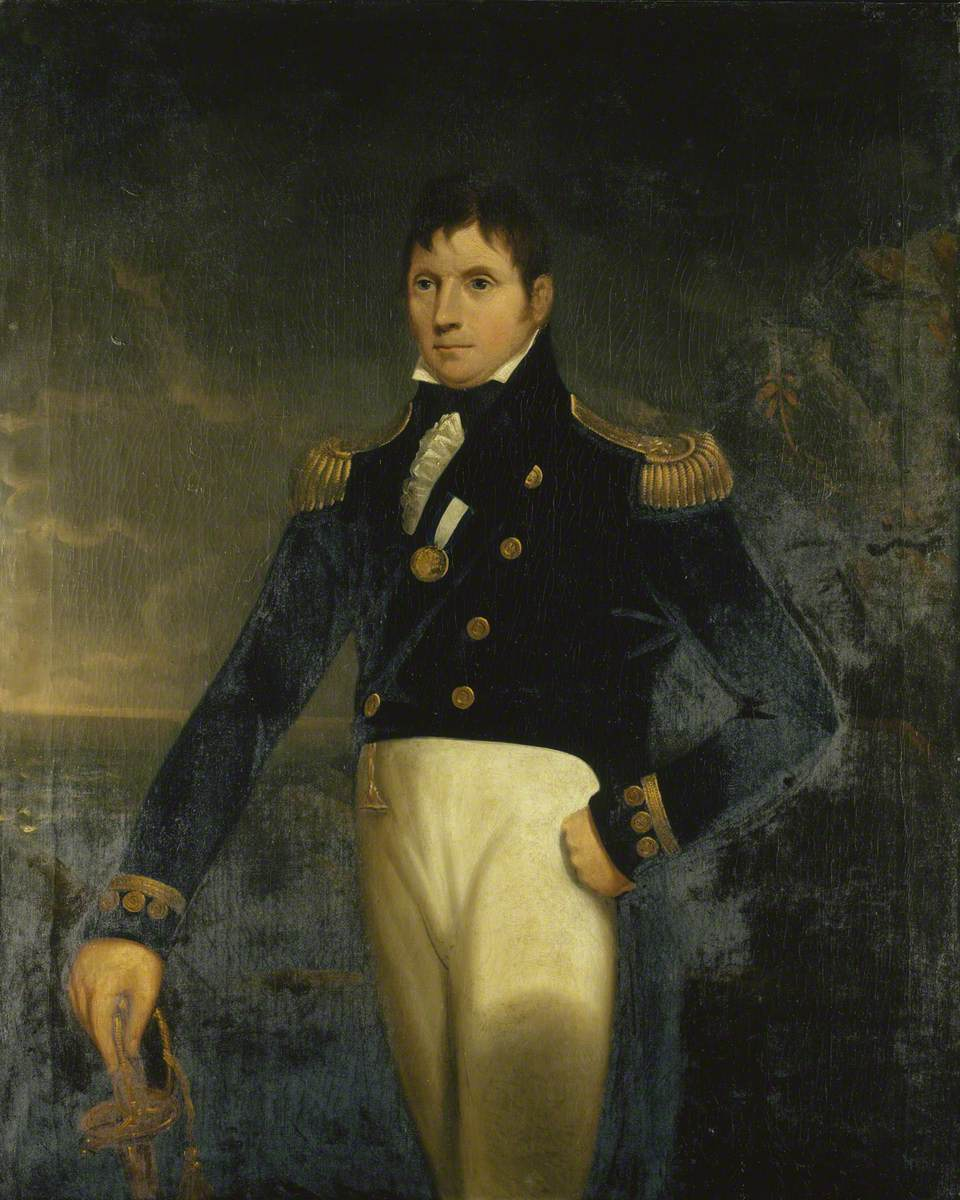
- Portrait by Lemuel Francis Abbott, c. 1806
- Born: 5 December 1758; Rolls Park, Chigwell
- Died: 20 February 1830 (aged 71); Rolls Park, Chigwell
- Military career
- Allegiance: Great Britain; United Kingdom
- Branch: Royal Navy
- Service years: 1771–1810
- Rank: Admiral
- Conflicts: American War of Independence; French Revolutionary Wars; Invasion of Guadeloupe (1794); Battle of Martinique (1794); Napoleonic Wars; Battle of Trafalgar
- Awards: Knight Grand Cross of the Order of the Bath; Naval Gold Medal
- Other work: Member of Parliament for Maldon (1780–1784) and Essex (1802–1812), (1820–1830)

Admiral Sir Eliab Harvey GCB (5 December 1758 – 20 February 1830) was a Royal Navy officer and politician who served in the French Revolutionary and Napoleonic Wars and was as distinguished for his gambling and dueling as for his military record. Although Harvey was a significant naval figure for over twenty years, his martial reputation was largely based on his experiences at the Battle of Trafalgar, when he took his ship HMS Temeraire into the thick of the action. Harvey used Temeraire to force the surrender of two French ships of the line and later created his family motto from the names of his opponents in the engagement; "Redoutable et Fougueux".

In his civilian life, Harvey pursued political interests and spent three spells as a Member of Parliament for Maldon and later Essex. During this period he was also knighted. However, Harvey was not a peaceable man and his life both in and out of the Navy was frequently punctuated by disputes with fellow officers and politicians. One such dispute, a consequence of the Battle of the Basque Roads, eventually cost Harvey his career; a bitter exchange with Lord Gambier forcing Harvey into early retirement in 1809. Although reinstated a year later, Harvey was never again employed in an official capacity and further promotions were only bestowed as a matter of seniority.

Harvey was also notable in his time for his extravagant lifestyle. The deaths of his father and elder brother while he was still a young man provided Harvey with a considerable fortune, much of which he squandered gambling in London. Harvey's exploits at the gaming tables became legendary, one story claiming that he once bet £100,000 on a single game of chance and lost, only to win most of it back on the following throw. Despite his dissolute lifestyle, Harvey was married and had numerous children; he was survived by six daughters and had three sons who predeceased him.

== Early life ==
Eliab Harvey was born in Chigwell, Essex to William and Emma Harvey. His father William Harvey (1714-1763) was a Member of Parliament for Essex, but died when Harvey was only five years old. Eliab was named after his great grandfather, Eliab Harvey, brother to the most famous William Harvey, who discovered the circulation of the blood.

Until 1768, Harvey was raised at the family estate of Rolls Park in Chigwell, which had passed to his elder brother William on the death of their father. Harvey then attended Westminster School for two years before moving to Harrow School in 1770. At the age of thirteen in 1771, Harvey was entered onto the books of the naval schooner HMS Mary, although he did not actually serve aboard the ship. Utilising a standard legal fiction of the time, Harvey's name was entered on the ship's books without his actual presence, a ruse that would provide him with sufficient seniority to gain rapid promotion when he did enter the navy. In his summer holidays from school, Harvey served at sea, joining HMS Orpheus in 1773.

Entering the Navy fully in May 1774, Harvey became a midshipman aboard the sloop HMS Lynx and spent the next two years in the West Indies. Briefly returning to Britain at the outbreak of the American War of Independence, Harvey returned to the eastern seaboard of North America late in 1776 aboard HMS Mermaid, before transferring to the flagship of the North America Station HMS Eagle. From there Harvey joined HMS Liverpool on temporary assignment, only to be wrecked on Long Island aboard the frigate in 1778. Harvey rejoined Eagle after the wreck and returned to Britain in her. He was promoted to lieutenant on 25 February 1779.

Following his promotion, Harvey took a leave of absence from the Navy which would last three years. He took over the parliamentary seat for Maldon in Essex in 1780 on the death of Richard Savage Nassau, and then won it again in the general election a few months later, holding the seat for the next four years. In 1781 Harvey briefly commanded HMS Dolphin, but took leave once again four months later. In 1782 Harvey again returned to the Navy just as peace was agreed and was promoted to commander on 21 March 1782, briefly taking over the sloop HMS Otter before rapidly making the jump to Post Captain less than a year later, on 20 January 1783.

== Civilian life ==
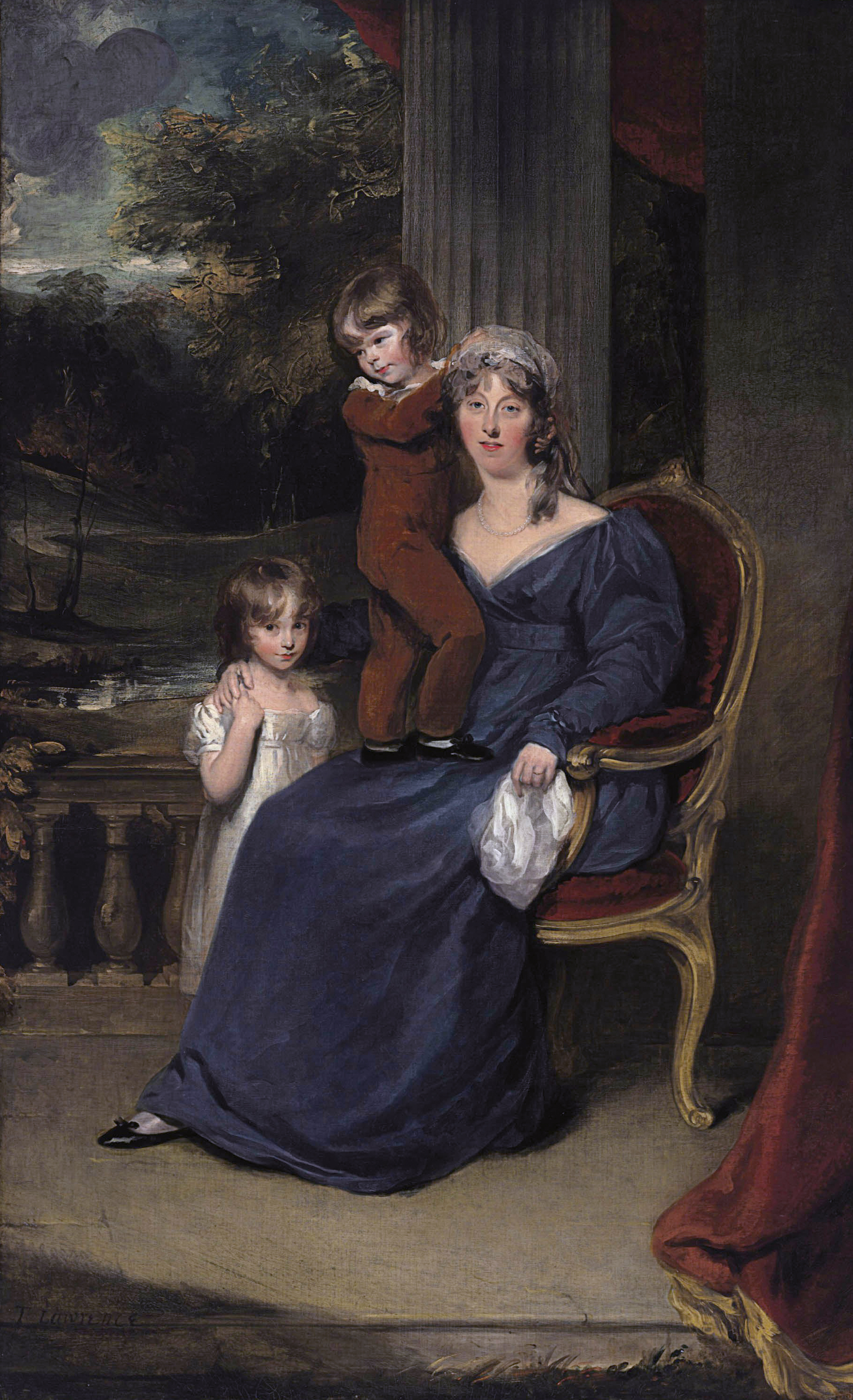
Lady Louisa Harvey with two of her children (Thomas Lawrence)

With the peace of 1783, Harvey again took leave from the navy, seeing out his parliamentary term and continuing his notorious lifestyle of gambling and debauchery. The young death of Harvey's elder brother William Harvey, MP in April 1779 had provided Harvey with a substantial fortune, which he immediately began squandering in epic nights at London's fashionable drinking and gambling establishments. Harvey gained a reputation among this crowd for playing exceptionally high stakes; one often repeated story concerns his loss, on his 21st birthday in 1779, of over £100,000 in a single game of hazard to a Mr O'Byrne. O'Byrne, recognising that such a sum would bankrupt his opponent, refused to take more than £10,000, insisting that they roll the dice again to determine the fate of the remaining £90,000. Harvey won and kept his fortune, but reportedly still failed to pay the £10,000.

Despite this riotous lifestyle, Harvey married Lady Louisa Nugent in 1784. Louisa was a daughter of Robert Nugent, 1st Earl Nugent and co-heir to his substantial wealth. The couple had nine children, eight of whom survived infancy and six of whom, all daughters, outlived their father. Harvey's eldest son was killed in action serving in the British Army under the Marquess of Wellington at the siege of Burgos in 1812. Harvey remained in semi-retirement until 1790, dividing his time between London and Rolls Park.

== Return to service ==
In 1790, Harvey was recalled up to the Navy during the Spanish armament and commanded the frigate HMS Hussar for six months, until the Navy returned to its peacetime complement. Three years later, Harvey was once again recalled to the Navy with the outbreak of the French Revolutionary Wars. Harvey would remain in service for the next 16 years, only briefly taking leave in 1802 during the Peace of Amiens. In 1793, Harvey became captain of the frigate HMS Santa Margarita in the West Indies. There he participated in the invasions of the French colonies of Guadeloupe and Martinique under Admiral John Jervis. In May 1794 Harvey returned to Britain and served in the squadron under Sir John Borlase Warren which raided the French coast with great success in 1794 and 1795.

In August 1795, Harvey took command of the ship of the line HMS Valiant, initially in the Channel Fleet and later in the West Indies under Sir Hyde Parker. In 1797 Harvey returned to Britain due to ill-health, and was given command of the Essex sea fencibles during the next year. In 1800 Harvey returned to sea in command of HMS Triumph, which he retained until the Peace of Amiens. During the peace he again dabbled in politics, becoming MP for Essex in 1802. Even after returning to the Navy in 1803 as captain of the second rate HMS Temeraire, Harvey remained in parliament, serving until 1812.

== Trafalgar ==
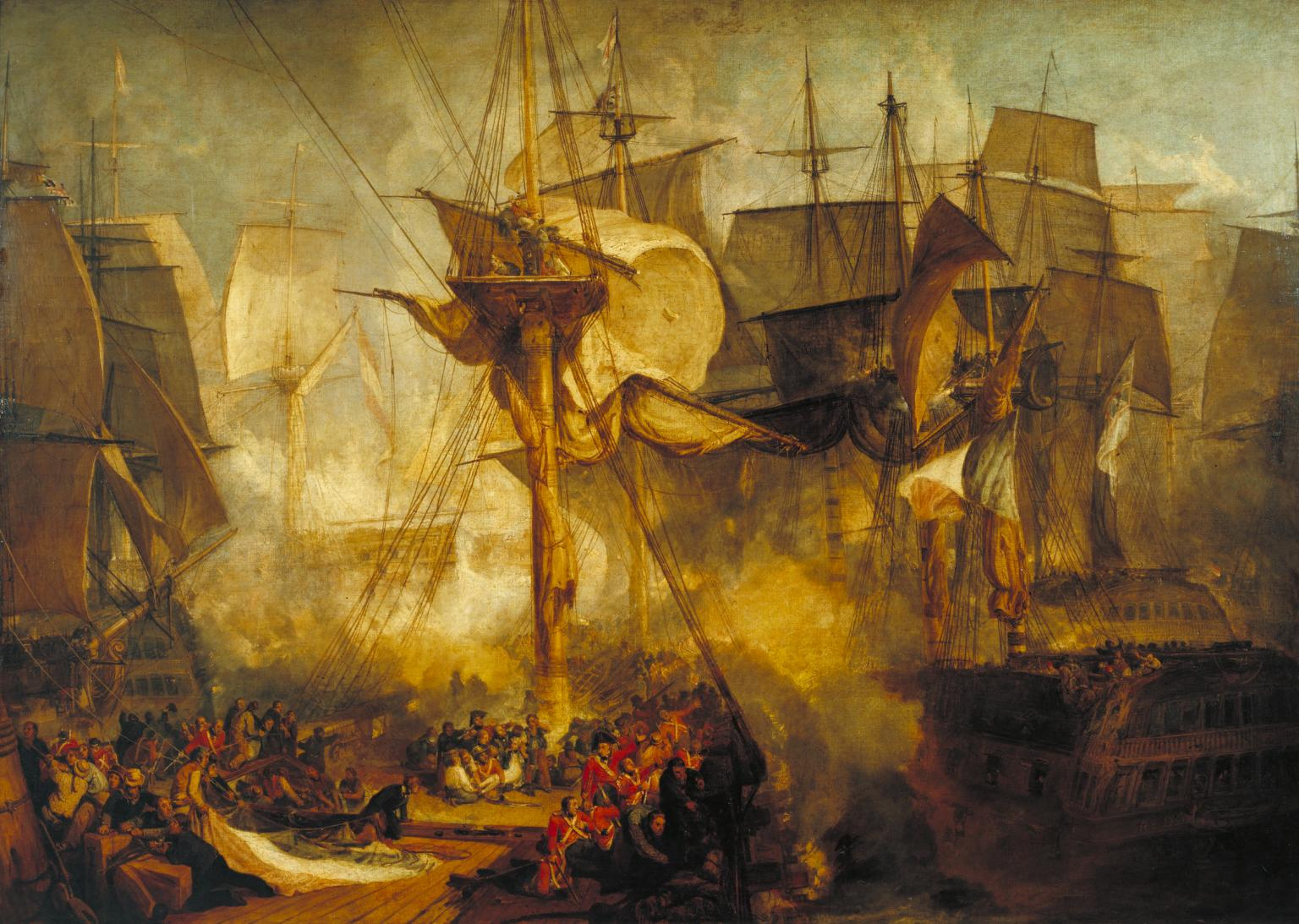
Temeraire at the Battle of Trafalgar from the painting The Battle of Trafalgar by J. M. W. Turner

With the resumption of the war against France, Temeraire was attached to the Channel Fleet and blockaded ports in eastern France until 1805, when Harvey was sent to join Horatio Nelson's blockade off Cádiz. When the Battle of Trafalgar was joined on 21 October, Harvey's Temeraire was the second ship in Nelson's division and was a faster and more agile ship than HMS Victory, Nelson's flagship. As a result, Temeraire began to pull ahead of Victory as the division closed on the Franco-Spanish fleet and Harvey was consequently reprimanded by Nelson, who hailed Temeraire: "I will thank you Captain Harvey, to keep your proper station which is astern of the Victory".

During the combat that followed, Harvey was heavily engaged with the Franco-Spanish fleet, passing behind Bucentaure and astern of Redoutable. The broadside fired into Redoutable reduced the French ship to a wreck and forced its surrender soon afterwards when it became tangled with Victory and Temeraire. The three ships then drifted into the following French Fougueux, British fire disabling her and giving cover to a boarding party led by Temeraire's first-lieutenant, Thomas Fortescue Kennedy, which forced the surrender of Fougueux's crew. In later years Harvey would use this incident for his personal motto "Redoutable et Fougueux".

Once the fleet had returned to port, controversy erupted concerning Harvey's role in the battle. Although his bravery and skill were not questioned, his prominence in the dispatch sent home by Cuthbert Collingwood was. In the dispatch, Harvey was singled out over the other captains for his bravery, Collingwood writing: "I have not words in which I can sufficiently express my admiration of it". As a result of this special mention, Harvey was promoted to rear-admiral on 9 November 1805, and given the honour of being one of Nelson's pallbearers at the admiral's funeral despite their short acquaintance. Harvey's new motto and his penchant for "bragging" further alienated him from his fellow officers.

== Retirement ==
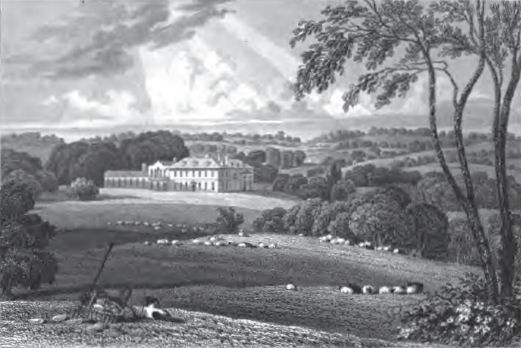
Rolls Park, the Harvey family home, from Views of the seats of noblemen and gentlemen in England, Wales, Scotland and Ireland, Second Series, Volume III, by John Preston Neale, 1826.

Returning to naval service some months after the action, Harvey was given the 80-gun HMS Tonnant as his first flagship, in which he remained until 1809. Serving under Lord Gambier in the Channel Fleet, Harvey was outraged not to be given command of the British ships in action at the Battle of the Basque Roads. Harvey expressed his disgust that command had been given to the more junior Lord Cochrane in no uncertain terms to Gambier, and was dismissed from the admiral's council as a result. When the operation was initially successful, Gambier refused to support Cochrane and as a result an opportunity to annihilate the French Atlantic Fleet was lost. The ensuing dispute lasted years and involved a court martial that eventually acquitted Gambier, and only ended with Cochrane's dismissal from the service five years later.

Harvey was not embroiled in the political arguments surrounding the action as he had resigned his commission on 23 May 1809, a month after the attack went ahead, in protest at Cochrane's preferment. Returning to the Navy a year later on 21 March 1810, Harvey was never again called to active service, Gambier blocking his efforts to obtain gainful employment. Despite his failure to return to the sea, Harvey's seniority brought more promotions; he made vice-admiral in 1810 and finally became a full admiral in 1819. He was also made a Knight Commander of the Order of the Bath in 1815 when the order was reformed, becoming a Knight Grand Cross in 1825. Harvey's retirement included a further period in politics, returning to his seat as MP for Essex between 1820 and 1830.

Harvey died in 1830 at his family estate of Rolls Park and was buried in the Harvey family crypt at St Andrew's Church at Hempstead, Essex, near Saffron Walden, which contains the remains of over 50 family members, including his ancestor's brother, Dr. William Harvey. His coffin is still in the crypt, and can be viewed on request. On the wall of church is a hatchment in his honour originally placed shortly after his death and restored in 1958 after it was destroyed in the partial collapse of the church in 1884. A large wall memorial to him is also visible in the church, which also commemorates his youngest son William, who died in 1823 aged 22.

The crest of the Harvey Grammar School of Folkestone bears Harvey's motto as well as his ship's name 'Temeraire'. The crest was designed by Eliab Harvey.

== Arms ==
The funeral hatchment of Admiral Sir Eliab Harvey (1758–1830), bearing on one side his arms on a black ground, combined with those of his wife Louisa (nee Nugent), daughter of Robert Nugent, 1st Earl Nugent, on white, 1830.

Coat of arms of Eliab Harvey
Crest A dexter hand couped at the wrist and erect ppr. over it a crescent reversed argent, motto over, "Temeraire" Escutcheon Or, on a chief indented sable three crescents argent Supporters Dexter, a Triton, holding over the dexter shoulder a trident, laurel entwining it, all ppr.; sinister, a horse argent gorged with a naval crown or, on the rim the word "Trafalgar" sable hanging to it by a white ribbon with two blue stripes the Trafalgar medal or. Motto Redoubtable et fouguex

Coat of arms of Eliab Harvey

Motto
Temeraire

== Notes ==
Parliament of Great Britain
Preceded by John Strutt; Richard Savage Nassau	Member of Parliament for Maldon; 1780–1784; With: John Strutt	Succeeded by Lord Waltham; John Strutt
Parliament of the United Kingdom
Preceded by Thomas Berney Bramston; Colonel John Bullock	Member of Parliament for Essex; 1802–1812; With: Colonel John Bullock (1802–1809); John Archer-Houblon (1810–1812)	Succeeded by Charles Western; John Archer-Houblon
Preceded by Charles Western; John Archer-Houblon	Member of Parliament for Essex; 1820–1830; With: Charles Western	Succeeded by Charles Western; Thomas Gardiner Bramston
