= Thomas Berney Bramston =

British politician

Thomas Berney Bramston (1733–1813) was a British lawyer and politician who sat in the House of Commons from 1779 to 1802.

Bramston was the only son of Thomas Bramston of Skreens and his second wife Elizabeth Berney, daughter of Richard Berney, recorder of Norwich, Norfolk, and was born on 7 December 1733. He was educated at Felsted School and matriculated at New College, Oxford on 11 April 1751. In 1754, he was created MA. He was admitted at Middle Temple in 1752, and called to the bar in 1757. He married Mary Gardiner, daughter of Stephen Gardiner of Norwich on 10 January 1764. He succeeded his father in 1765.

Branston was active in support of the Tory interest in Essex, but declined repeated invitations to stand for Parliament because as a family man he could not afford the expense. Eventually he agreed to stand at a by-election on 11 May 1779, when he was returned unopposed as Member of Parliament for Essex. He was returned for Essex again unopposed in the 1780 general election. He became a Bencher of Middle Temple in 1783. In 1784 he was again returned for Essex. He was a member of the St. Alban's Tavern group which tried to bring Pitt and Fox together. He was returned for Essex again in 1790. In 1791 he became reader at Middle Temple and in 1795 treasurer of Middle Temple. At the 1796 general election he was returned for Essex again and he retired at the 1802 general election. He received the unanimous thanks of the county for his services.

In 1810 his son-in-law John Archer-Houblon became MP for Essex. Bramston died on 12 March 1813. He was succeeded by his son Thomas Gardiner Bramston who also became MP for Essex.

Parliament of Great Britain
Preceded by John Luther; William Harvey	Member of Parliament for Essex; 1779–1802; With: John Luther 1779–1784; Colonel John Bullock 1784–1802	Succeeded by Colonel John Bullock; Eliab Harvey
