= William Harvey (1754–1779) =

British politician

William Harvey (1754–1779) was a British politician who sat in the House of Commons from 1775 to 1779.

Harvey was the eldest son of William Harvey of Rolls Park, Essex, and his wife Emma Skynner, daughter of Stephen Skynner of Walthamstow, Essex, and was born on 10 September 1754. He was admitted at Trinity College, Cambridge on 3 November 1771.

Harvey was abroad when he was approved unanimously at a county meeting and was then returned unopposed as Member of Parliament for Essex at a by-election on 28 November 1775. In Parliament, he only voted once and is not known to have spoken.

Harvey died unmarried on 24 April 1779 and was buried at Hempstead, Essex. His estates passed to his brother Eliab Harvey.

Parliament of Great Britain
Preceded by John Luther; John Conyers	Member of Parliament for Essex; 1775–1779; With: John Luther	Succeeded by John Luther; Thomas Berney Bramston
