= John Conyers (Essex politician) =

English politician (1717–1775)

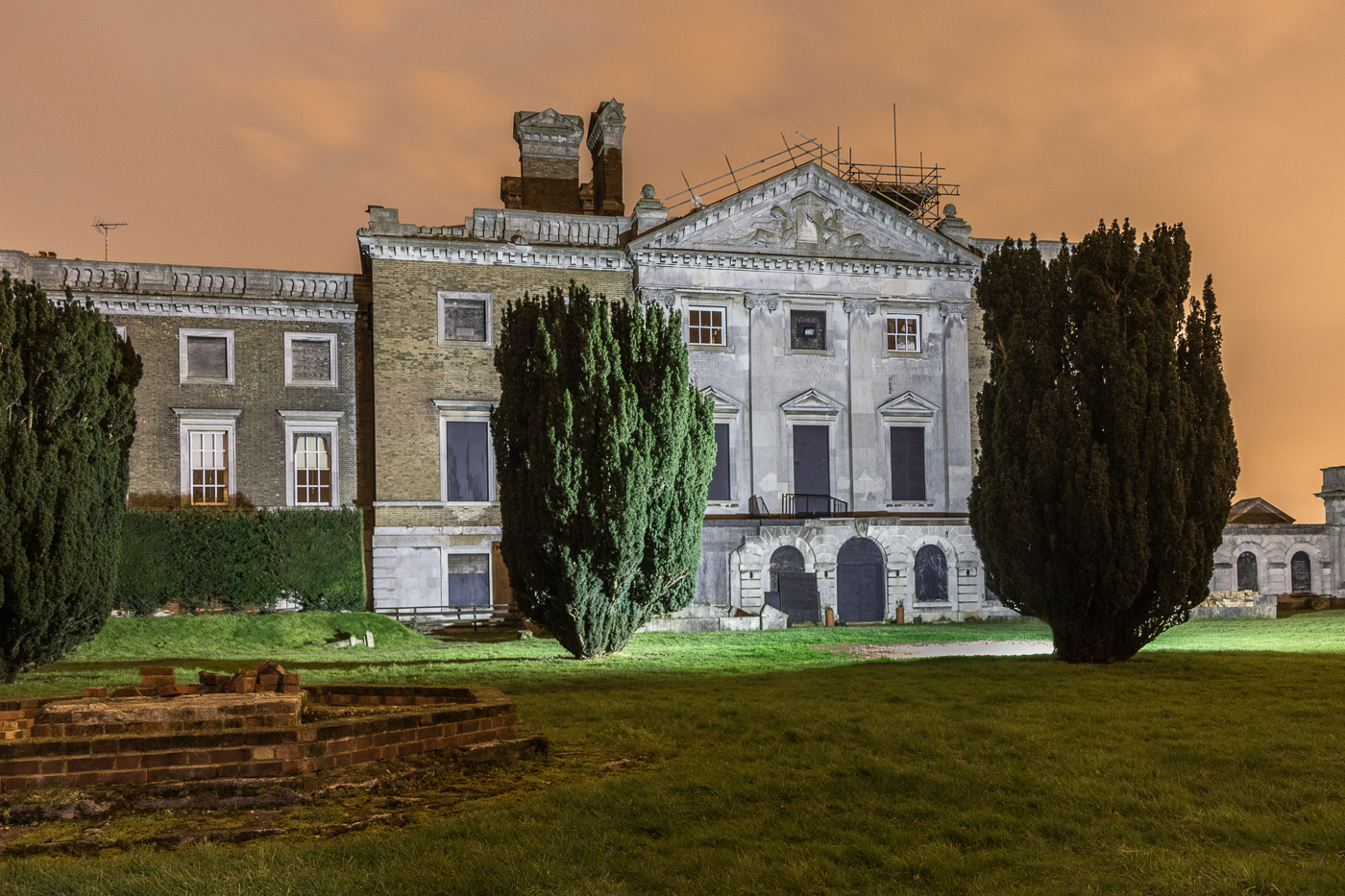
Copt Hall, Essex, as rebuilt by John Conyers 1751–1758

John Conyers (13 December 1717 – 8 September 1775) was a British Member of Parliament.

He was the eldest son of Edward Conyers, MP and was educated at University College, Oxford (1735). He succeeded his father in 1742, inheriting a somewhat dilapidated Copt Hall, near Epping, Essex, which he demolished and rebuilt.

He was a Tory member of the Parliament of Great Britain for Reading from 1747 to 1754 and for Essex from 25 February 1772 to 8 September 1775.

He married twice; firstly Hannah, the daughter of Richard Warner, of North Elmham, Norfolk and secondly his cousin, Lady Henrietta Frances, the daughter of Thomas Fermor, 1st Earl of Pomfret. They had 13 children, of whom 8 survived.

Parliament of Great Britain
Preceded by John Blagrave; William Strode	Member of Parliament for Reading; 1747–1754; With: Richard Neville Aldworth	Succeeded by William Strode; The Viscount Fane
Preceded by John Luther; Sir William Maynard	Member of Parliament for Essex; 1772–1775; With: John Luther	Succeeded by John Luther; William Harvey
