= List of fellows of the Royal Society elected in 1905 =

This is a list of fellows of the Royal Society elected in 1905.

== Fellows ==
- John George Adami (1862–1926)
- William Arthur Bone (1871–1938)
- John Edward Campbell (1862–1924)
- William Henry Dines (1855–1927)
- Sir Arthur Mostyn Field (1855–1950)
- Sir Martin Onslow Forster (1872–1945)
- Edwin Stephen Goodrich (1868–1946)
- Sir Frederick Gowland Hopkins (1861–1947)
- George William Lamplugh (1859–1926)
- Ernest William MacBride (1866–1940)
- Francis Wall Oliver (1864–1951)
- Sir David Prain (1857–1944)
- George Frederick Charles Searle (1864–1954)
- Robert John Strutt 4th Baron Rayleigh (1875–1947)
- Sir Edmund Taylor Whittaker (1873–1956)

== Foreign members ==
- Ludimar Hermann (1838–1914)
- Hendrik Antoon Lorentz (1853–1928)
- Henri Moissan (1852–1907)
- Hugo De Vries (1848–1935)
