= Strutt baronets =

Extinct baronetcy in the Baronetage of England

- Escutcheon of the Strutt baronets of Little Warley Hall
- Creation date: 1642
- Status: extinct
- Extinction date: 1661

The Strutt Baronetcy, of Little Warley Hall in the County of Essex, was a title in the Baronetage of England. It was created on 5 March 1642 for Denner Strutt. He left only daughters and the title became extinct on his death in 1661. The representation of the family devolved on his brother, Reverend Strutt, of Faulkbourne, Essex.

== Strutt baronets, of Little Warley Hall (1642) ==
- Sir Denner Strutt, 1st Baronet (died 1661)

== See also ==
- Baron Rayleigh
