= Thomas Gardiner Bramston =

English politician (1770–1831)

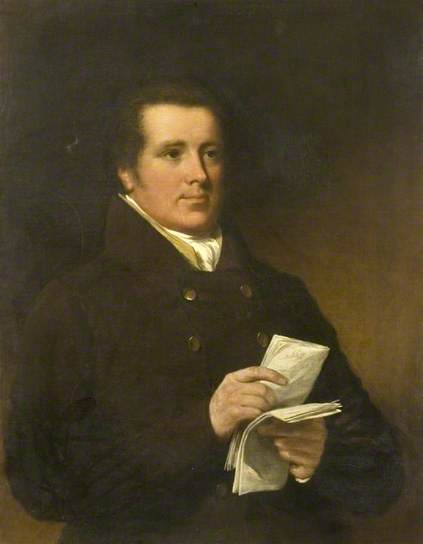
Thomas Gardiner Bramston

Thomas Gardiner Bramston (1770–1831) was an English politician.

== Life ==
He was the son of Thomas Berney Bramston, Member of Parliament for Essex, and his wife Mary Gardiner, educated at Felsted School and New College, Oxford. In 1813, he inherited the Skreens estate from his father.

For the 1820 general election, Bramston was nominated as candidate for Essex, though without his knowledge, by Henry Conyers and Francis Wollaston. He lost out to Eliab Harvey and Charles Callis Western, in the two-member constituency. During the 1826 general election he nominated George Allanson Winn for Maldon, but did not run himself. At this period he was concerned to defend the Corn Laws and oppose reform.

Harvey died in 1830. Bramston stood against Conyers for the vacant Essex seat, and was elected. The death of George IV then caused a general election of 1830, and Bramston was unwilling to stand again, having spent some four months in Parliament. He died of a burst blood vessel in 1831.

In 1796, Bramston married Maria Anne (died 1821), daughter of William Blaauw, of Queen Anne Street, Middlesex, of a Dutch family of Amsterdam burgomasters, and half-sister of the antiquarian William Henry Blaauw. They had two sons and six daughters. Bramston married secondly, in 1823, Charlotte, daughter of Sir Henry Hawley, 1st Baronet.
