= Terling Place =

18th century mansion in Terling, Essex, England

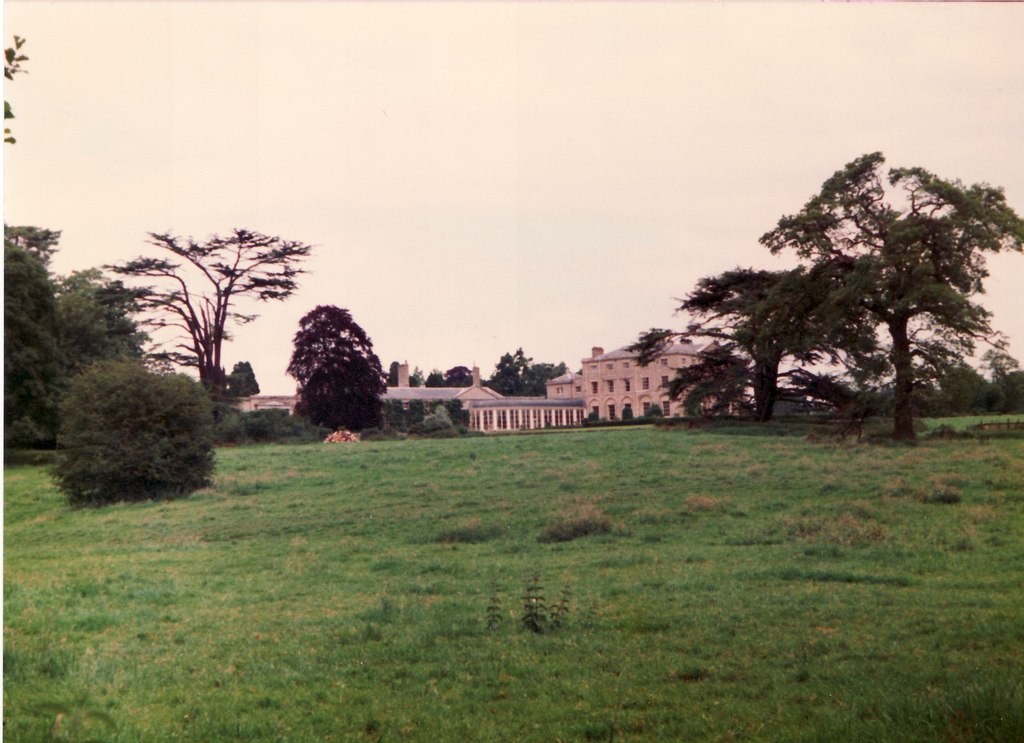

- Location within Essex

General information
- Architectural style: Georgian
- Location: Terling, Essex, England
- Coordinates: 51.8021°N 0.57097°E

Terling Place is a country house within the civil parish of Terling, Essex, England, located to the south of All Saints' Church, Terling. It is recorded in the National Heritage List for England as a Grade II listed building.

It was built for John Strutt, MP between 1772 and 1777 to the designs of John Johnson. The wings, a new porch, a two-storey saloon (with a gallery, and a frieze based on the Elgin Marbles) and a library were added between 1818 and 1824. The house was redecorated in 1850, when a conservatory was added. It is a Grade II* listed building.

From John Strutt the house passed to his eldest surviving son, Joseph, whose wife Lady Charlotte FitzGerald was created Baroness Rayleigh in 1821.

The 3rd Lord Rayleigh established a laboratory in the west wing, which remains to this day. Indeed, he used apparatus from this laboratory to isolate argon in the cellar of Terling Place in 1894, for which he was awarded the Nobel Prize in Physics in 1904.
