= Thomas Archer Houblon =

English Anglican priest (1849–1933)

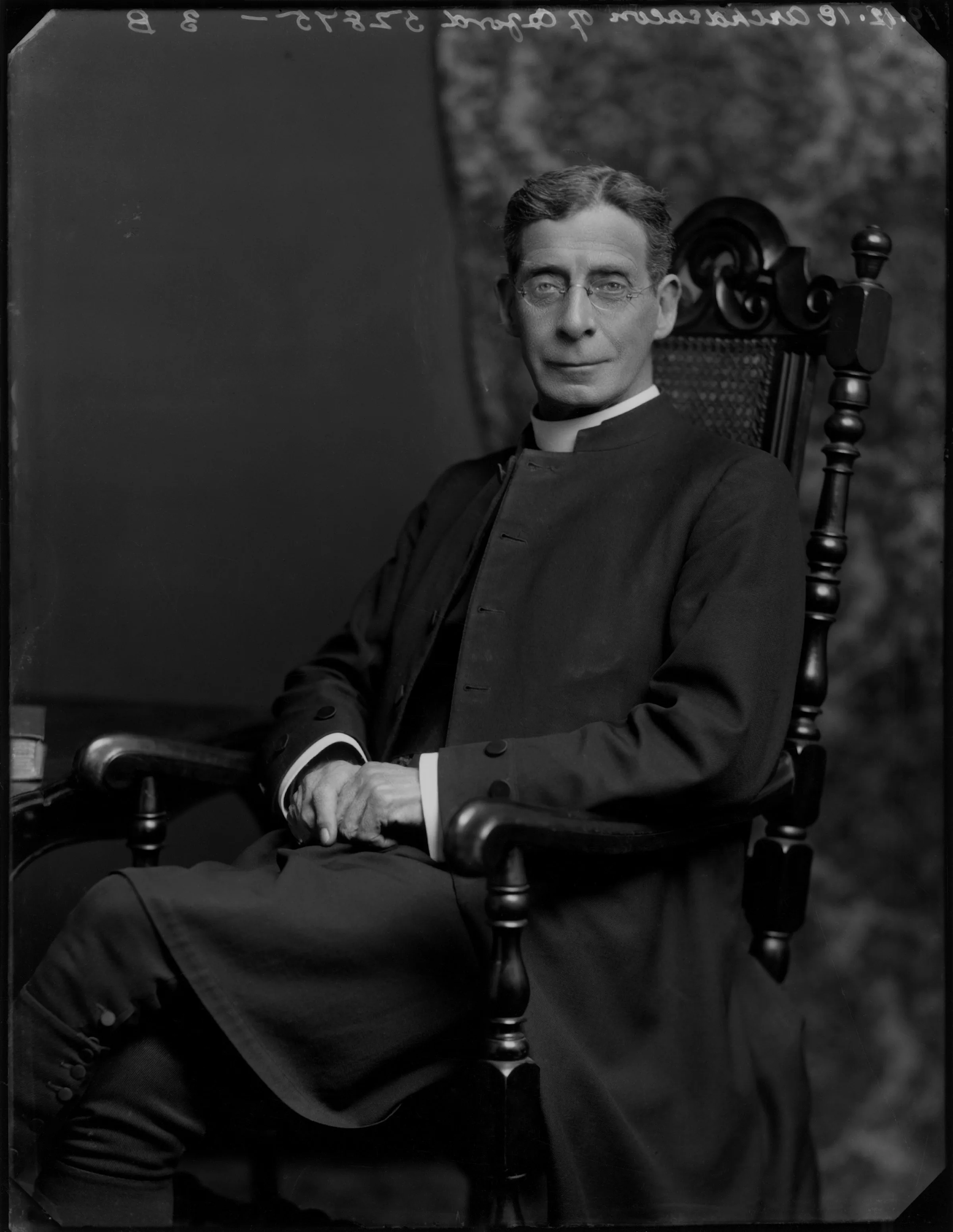
Houblon in 1918

Thomas Henry Archer Houblon was an Anglican priest in the early 20th century.

He was born into an ecclesiastical family on 9 October 1849 at Brighton in East Sussex. He was the son of Rev. Thomas Archer Houblon MA, sometime Rector of Peasemore and his wife, Eleanor Deedes; and grandson of John Archer Houblon of Welford Park in Berkshire and Hallingbury Place in Essex. John Houblon, the Governor of the Bank of England, was his ancestral uncle. He was educated at Radley and Christ Church. He was ordained in 1874 and was Curate of Wantage until his appointment to his father's old parish at Peasemore in 1876. He was Rector of Wantage from 1881 until 1903 and then Archdeacon of Oxford until his retirement in 1921. He died on 23 November 1933.
