= John William Strutt, 3rd Baron Rayleigh =

British physicist (1842–1919)

The Right Honourable The Lord Rayleigh OM PC FRS
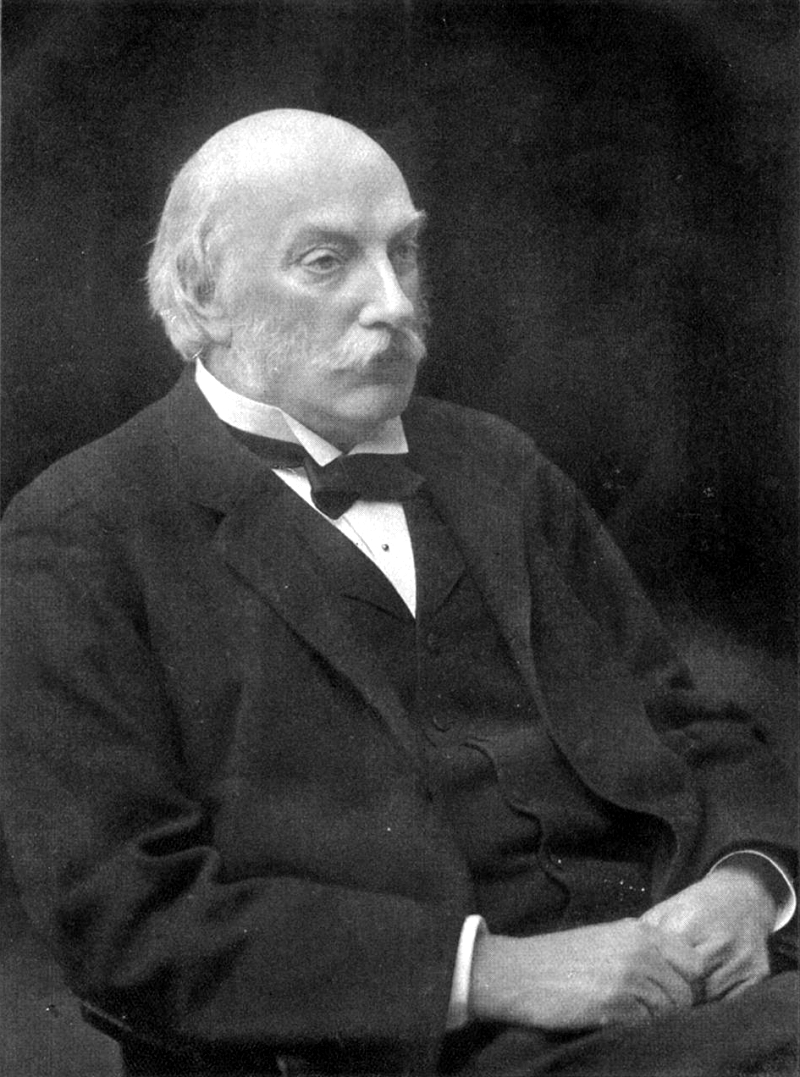
- Rayleigh in 1904

Chancellor of the University of Cambridge
- In office 1908–1919
- Preceded by: Spencer Cavendish, 8th Duke of Devonshire
- Succeeded by: Arthur Balfour, 1st Earl of Balfour

39th President of the Royal Society
- In office 1905–1908
- Preceded by: Sir William Huggins
- Succeeded by: Sir Archibald Geikie

Personal details
- Born: 12 November 1842 Maldon, England
- Died: 30 June 1919 (aged 76) Witham, England
- Spouse: Evelyn Balfour (m. 1871)
- Children: 3, including Robert
- Education: University of Cambridge (BA, MA)
- Known for: Discovery of argon; Rayleigh criterion; Rayleigh distribution; Rayleigh's energy theorem; Rayleigh's equation; Rayleigh flow; Rayleigh law; Rayleigh length; Rayleigh number; Rayleigh problem; Rayleigh scattering; Rayleigh waves; Rayleigh–Gans approximation; Rayleigh–Bénard convection; Rayleigh–Plesset equation; Rayleigh–Taylor instability; Rayleigh–Jeans law
- Awards: Royal Medal (1882); De Morgan Medal (1890); Matteucci Medal (1894); Faraday Lectureship Prize (1895); Copley Medal (1899); Nobel Prize in Physics (1904); Albert Medal (1905); Elliott Cresson Medal (1913); Rumford Medal (1914)
- Scientific career
- Fields: Physics
- Workplaces: University of Cambridge; Royal Institution
- Academic advisors: James Clerk Maxwell; Edward Routh; George Stokes
- Notable students: Jagadish Chandra Bose; J. J. Thomson

Signature
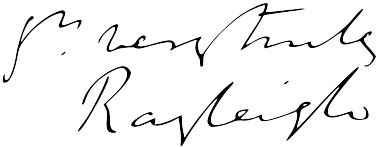

John William Strutt, 3rd Baron Rayleigh (/ˈreɪli/ RAY-lee; 12 November 1842 – 30 June 1919), was a British physicist and hereditary peer who received the Nobel Prize in Physics in 1904 for his discovery of argon.

In 1871, Rayleigh published the first theoretical treatment of the elastic scattering of light by particles much smaller than the light's wavelength, a phenomenon now known as Rayleigh scattering, which notably explains why the sky is blue. He studied and described transverse surface waves in solids, now known as Rayleigh waves. He contributed extensively to fluid dynamics, with concepts such as the Rayleigh number (a dimensionless number associated with natural convection), Rayleigh flow, the Rayleigh–Taylor instability, and Rayleigh's criterion for the stability of Taylor–Couette flow.

Rayleigh also formulated the circulation theory of aerodynamic lift. In optics, he proposed a well-known criterion for angular resolution. His derivation of the Rayleigh–Jeans law for classical black-body radiation later played an important role in the birth of quantum mechanics (see ultraviolet catastrophe). His textbook, The Theory of Sound (1877), is still used today by acousticians and engineers. He introduced the Rayleigh test for circular non-uniformity, which the Rayleigh plot visualises.

Rayleigh served as President of the Royal Society from 1905 to 1908, and as Chancellor of the University of Cambridge from 1908 until his death in 1919.

== Biography ==
John William Strutt was born on 12 November 1842 at Langford Grove, Maypole Road in Maldon, Essex, England, the son of Clara Elizabeth (née La Touche) and John James Strutt, 2nd Baron Rayleigh. In his early years, he suffered from frailty and poor health. Strutt attended Eton College and Harrow School (each for only a short period), before entering Trinity College, Cambridge, in 1861, where he studied mathematics. In 1865, he received a Bachelor of Arts (Senior Wrangler and Smith's Prizeman), and was elected a Fellow of Trinity College the following year. He obtained a Master of Arts in 1868.

In 1871, Strutt resigned from his fellowship to marry Evelyn Balfour, the daughter of James Maitland Balfour, with whom he had three sons. In 1873, on the death of his father, he inherited the Barony of Rayleigh.

Rayleigh died on 30 June 1919 in Witham at the age of 76, and was buried in the graveyard of All Saints' Church in Terling. His son Robert, a physicist, succeeded him as Baron Rayleigh.

== Career and research ==
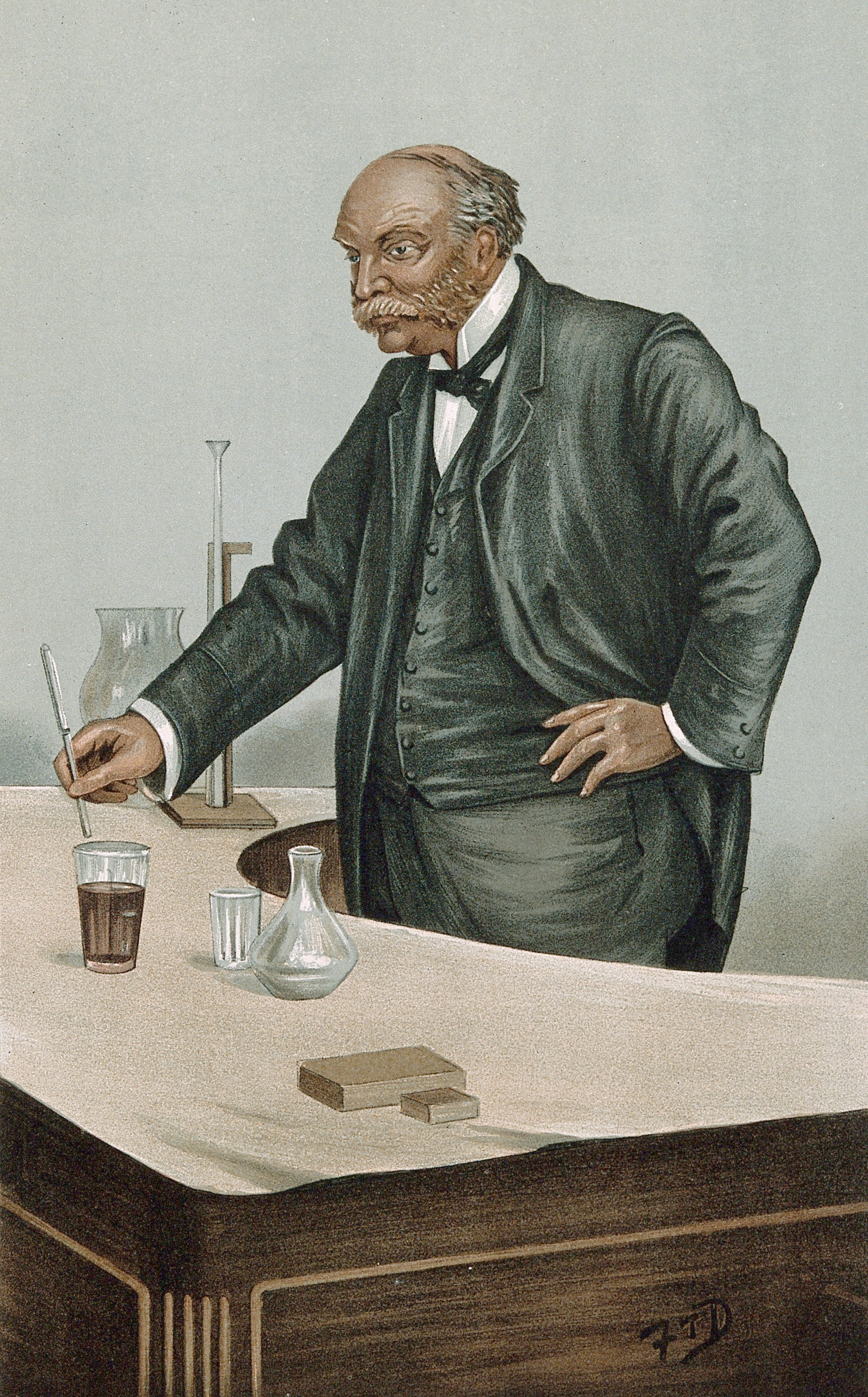
Caricature of Lord Rayleigh in the London magazine Vanity Fair, 1899.

In 1879, Rayleigh was appointed Cavendish Professor of Physics at the University of Cambridge. In 1883, Rayleigh first described dynamic soaring by seabirds in Nature. The following year, he resigned as Cavendish Professor to continue his experimental work at Terling Place. In 1887, he succeeded John Tyndall as Professor of Natural Philosophy at the Royal Institution.

Rayleigh carefully and precisely measured atomic mass of oxygen and hydrogen, and by 1892 he moved on to nitrogen. By isolating nitrogen in different ways he discovered a small but significant difference, which indicated a heavier inert gas present in the air besides nitrogen. William Ramsay joined this research topic, and in August 1894 they discovered argon. For research related to this discovery, Rayleigh and Ramsay were awarded the 1904 Nobel Prizes in Physics and Chemistry, respectively.

Around 1900, Rayleigh developed the duplex (combination of two) theory of human sound localisation using two binaural cues, interaural phase difference (IPD) and interaural level difference (ILD) (based on analysis of a spherical head with no external pinnae). The theory posits that we use two primary cues for sound lateralisation, using the difference in the phases of sinusoidal components of the sound and the difference in amplitude (level) between the two ears.

Rayleigh received the degree of Doctor mathematicae (honoris causa) from the Royal Frederick University on 6 September 1902, when they celebrated the centennial of the birth of mathematician Niels Abel.

From 1905 to 1908, Rayleigh served as President of the Royal Society. From time to time, he participated in the House of Lords; however, he spoke up only if politics attempted to become involved in science. During the First World War, he was President of the Advisory Committee for Aeronautics, which was located at the National Physical Laboratory and chaired by Richard Glazebrook. In 1919, Rayleigh served as President of the Society for Psychical Research. As an advocate that simplicity and theory be part of the scientific method, he argued for the principle of similitude.

== Religious views ==
Rayleigh was an Anglican. Though he did not write about the relationship between science and religion, he retained a personal interest in spiritual matters. When his scientific papers were to be published in a collection by the Cambridge University Press, Strutt wanted to include a quotation from the Bible, but he was discouraged from doing so, as he later reported:

When I was bringing out my Scientific Papers I proposed a motto from the Psalms, "The Works of the Lord are great, sought out of all them that have pleasure therein." The Secretary to the Press suggested with many apologies that the reader might suppose that I was the Lord.

Still, he had his wish and the quotation was printed in the five-volume collection of scientific papers. In a letter to a family member, he wrote about his rejection of materialism and spoke of Jesus Christ as a moral teacher:

I have never thought the materialist view possible, and I look to a power beyond what we see, and to a life in which we may at least hope to take part. What is more, I think that Christ and indeed other spiritually gifted men see further and truer than I do, and I wish to follow them as far as I can.

— Rayleigh (1910)

Rayleigh held an interest in parapsychology and was an early member of the Society for Psychical Research (SPR). He was not convinced of spiritualism but remained open to the possibility of supernatural phenomena. Rayleigh was the president of the SPR in 1919. He gave a presidential address in the year of his death but did not come to any definite conclusions.

== Recognition ==
=== Memberships ===
Year	Organisation	Type	Ref.
1873	Royal Society	Fellow	
1886	American Philosophical Society	International Member	

=== Awards ===
Year	Organisation	Award	Citation	Ref.
1882	Royal Society	Royal Medal	"For his various papers in mathematical and experimental physics."	
1890	London Mathematical Society	De Morgan Medal	—	
1894	Accademia dei XL	Matteucci Medal	—	
1895	Royal Society of Chemistry	Faraday Lectureship Prize	—	
1899	Royal Society	Copley Medal	"In recognition of his contributions to physical science."	
1904	Royal Swedish Academy of Sciences	Nobel Prize in Physics	"For his investigations of the densities of the most important gases and for his discovery of argon in connection with these studies."	
1905	Royal Society of Arts	Albert Medal	—	
1913	Franklin Institute	Elliott Cresson Medal	"For extended researches in physical science."	
1914	Royal Society	Rumford Medal	"On the ground[s] of his investigations in thermodynamics and on radiation."	

=== Honours ===
Year	Country	Honour	Ref.
1902	United Kingdom	Order of Merit	
1903	Germany	Pour le Mérite	

== Commemoration ==
A lunar crater, as well as a Martian crater, are named in his honour. The asteroid 22740 Rayleigh was named after him on 1 June 2007. The rayl, a unit of specific acoustic impedance, is also named for him.

Sir William Ramsay, his co-worker in the investigation to discover argon, described Rayleigh as "the greatest man alive" while speaking to Lady Ramsay during his last illness.

H. M. Hyndman said of Rayleigh that "no man ever showed less consciousness of great genius".

In honour of Lord Rayleigh, the Institute of Acoustics sponsors the Rayleigh Medal (established in 1970) and the Institute of Physics sponsors the John William Strutt, Lord Rayleigh Medal and Prize (established in 2008).

Many of the papers that he wrote on lubrication are now recognized as early classical contributions to the field of tribology. For these contributions, he was named as one of the 23 "Men of Tribology" by Duncan Dowson.

There is a memorial to him by Derwent Wood in St Andrew's Chapel at Westminster Abbey.

The National Physical Laboratory (NPL) bestows the Rayleigh Award annually to "the authors of the most outstanding NPL paper published in the previous calendar year."

== Publications ==
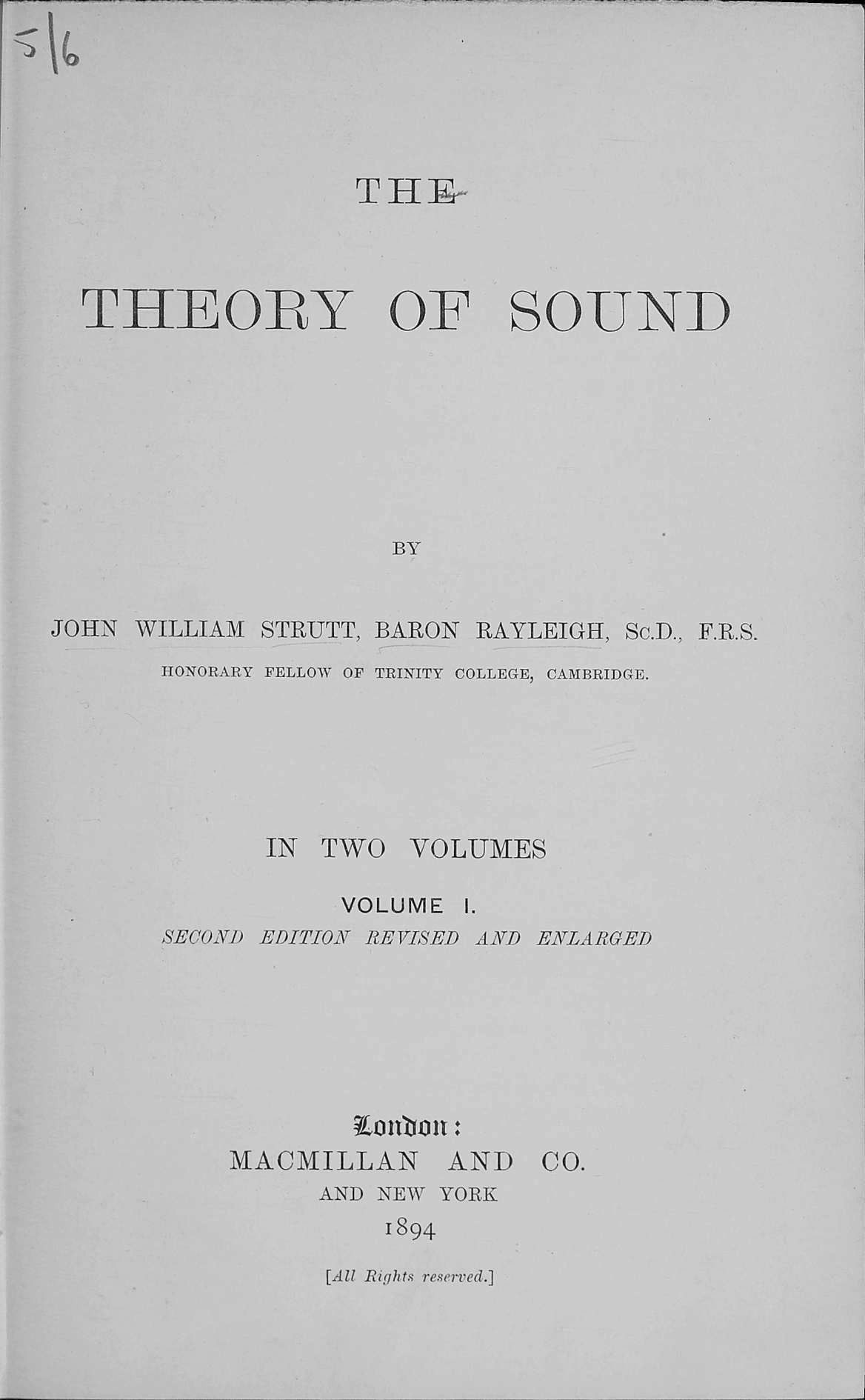
Theory of sound, 1894

- The Theory of Sound vol. I (London : Macmillan, 1877, 1894) (alternative link: Bibliothèque Nationale de France OR (Cambridge: University Press, reissued 2011, ISBN 978-1-108-03220-9)
- The Theory of Sound vol.II (London : Macmillan, 1878, 1896) (alternative link: Bibliothèque Nationale de France) OR (Cambridge: University Press, reissued 2011, ISBN 978-1-108-03221-6)
- Scientific papers (Vol. 1: 1869–1881) (Cambridge : University Press, 1899–1920, reissued by the publisher 2011, ISBN 978-0-511-70396-6)
- Scientific papers (Vol. 2: 1881–1887) (Cambridge : University Press, 1899–1920, reissued by the publisher 2011, ISBN 978-0-511-70397-3)
- Scientific papers (Vol. 3: 1887–1892) (Cambridge : University Press, 1899–1920, reissued by the publisher 2011, ISBN 978-0-511-70398-0)
- Scientific papers (Vol. 4: 1892–1901) (Cambridge : University Press, 1899–1920, reissued by the publisher 2011, ISBN 978-0-511-70399-7)
- Scientific papers (Vol. 5: 1902–1910) (Cambridge : University Press, 1899–1920, reissued by the publisher 2011, ISBN 978-0-511-70400-0)
- Scientific papers (Vol. 6: 1911–1919) (Cambridge : University Press, 1899–1920, reissued by the publisher 2011, ISBN 978-0-511-70401-7)

== See also ==
- Acoustic levitation
- Acoustic radiation pressure
- Aeolian harp
- Breath-figure self-assembly
- Calibrated airspeed
- Capillary breakup rheometry
- Clark cell
- Dawes' limit
- Extremal principles in non-equilibrium thermodynamics
- Eigenvalue perturbation
- Group velocity
- Hanle effect
- Helmholtz minimum dissipation theorem
- Laminar–turbulent transition
- Langmuir–Blodgett trough
- List of presidents of the Royal Society
- Machmeter
- Moffatt eddies
- Multiple scattering theory
- Parametric oscillator
- Rayleigh frequency
- Rayleigh–Sommerfeld diffraction theory
- Rayleigh mixture distribution
- Rayleigh bandwidth (signal processing)
- Rayleigh quotient iteration
- Rayleigh's quotient in vibrations analysis
- Rayleigh sky model
- Representative layer theory
- Talbot effect
- Thermoacoustics
- Thermoacoustic heat engine
- Virial theorem
- Waveguide (acoustics)
- Waveguide (radio frequency)
- WKB approximation

Honorary titles
Preceded by The Lord Carlingford	Lord Lieutenant of Essex; 1892–1901	Succeeded by The Earl of Warwick
Professional and academic associations
Preceded by William Huggins	39th President of the Royal Society; 1905–1908	Succeeded by Archibald Geikie
Academic offices
Preceded by The Duke of Devonshire	Chancellor of the University of Cambridge; 1908–1919	Succeeded by Arthur Balfour
Preceded by James Clerk Maxwell	Cavendish Professor of Experimental Physics, University of Cambridge; 1879–1884	Succeeded by J. J. Thomson
Peerage of the United Kingdom
Preceded by John Strutt	Baron Rayleigh; 1873–1919	Succeeded by Robert Strutt
