= Joseph Strutt (MP) =

British soldier and Member of Parliament

Joseph Holden Strutt (21 November 1758 – 11/18 February 1845), was a British soldier and long-standing Member of Parliament. He served in the Army and achieved the rank of colonel, and also sat as Member of Parliament for Maldon from 1790 to 1826 and for Okehampton from 1826 to 1830.

== Education ==
Felsted School; Winchester College 1768; Brasenose College, Oxford 1778.

== Family ==
Strutt was the 2nd son of John Strutt of Terling Place by Anne, daughter of Reverend William Goodday, rector of Strelley, Nottinghamshire. His elder brother John died in 1781.

He married Lady Charlotte FitzGerald, daughter of James FitzGerald, 1st Duke of Leinster, and Lady Emily Lennox, in Toulouse on 21/23 February 1789. With her he had one son and two daughters.

== Military career ==
Strutt was Lieutenant Colonel of the western battalion of the Essex militia from 1783 to 1796, Colonel of the South Essex militia in 1798, 1803-5 and 1809, and West Essex militia 1823–31;

When the supplementary militia was reduced, Strutt offered William Pitt the Younger, and subsequently Henry Addington, his services in raising a regiment: the advent of peace rendered his offer superfluous.

== Parliamentary career ==
Strutt returned from France to contest his father's seat in Maldon on the latter's retirement in 1790. A mostly silent but conscientious parliamentarian, Strutt made little mark in Parliament; but, he set great store by his and his father's services to government in Essex, where his father was ‘a constitutional pillar’ and where Strutt was active as a militia colonel. They were proudly insistent that Maldon was ‘a county, not a borough interest’ and, waiving pretensions to a county seat, resisted moves by government to influence Maldon elections.

Like his father, he generally supported government, describing himself as a Tory in 1816; but he regarded himself as particularly attached to Pitt in politics.

At the June 1826 general election Strutt was returned in absentia for Okehampton.

Aged 71, he left Parliament at the dissolution in July 1830.

== Peerage ==
According to The History of Parliament, Strutt, 'under a cloak of false humility' had vainly pestered successive Tory ministries for a British peerage for his wife, Charlotte, on the strength of his own and his father’s electoral and militia services in Essex. In a fragment of autobiography, intended as a lesson in filial obedience and civic duty for his troublesome son John James (1796-1873), he boasted that he had ‘obtained the approbation’ of Pitt, Dundas, Addington, Perceval, Lord Liverpool and George IV, among others; but in reality they considered him tiresome and importunate. His persistence was rewarded when his wife was offered the long sought after peerage in her own right as Baroness Rayleigh in the coronation creations of 1821. Strutt, returning thanks to Liverpool, described the honour as ‘requiting the long constitutional conduct in and out of Parliament of my ... father and of my humble constant exertions within the sphere of a country gentleman’. Lady Rayleigh died in 1836 and Strutt survived her by nine years, which gave his son precedence of rank over him.

== Death ==
In his declining years he was consoled and nursed by his unmarried daughter Emily Anne (1790-1865), for whose future comfort he bought in 1840 St. Catherine's Court, near Bath, where he mostly spent the last five years of his life.

Strutt died at Bath in February 1845 aged 86, four weeks after being forced by a fire in his bedroom to take to the street in his nightshirt.

== See also ==
- Baron Rayleigh

== Notes ==
Parliament of the United Kingdom
Preceded by John Strutt; Sir Peter Parker	Member of Parliament for Maldon; 1790–1826; With: Charles Callis Western 1790–1806; Benjamin Gaskell 1806–1807; Charles Callis Western 1807–1812; Benjamin Gaskell 1812–1826	Succeeded by George Mark Arthur Way Allanson-Winn; Thomas Barrett-Lennard
Preceded by Lord Glenorchy; William Henry Trant	Member of Parliament for Okehampton; 1826–1830; With: Sir Compton Domvile	Succeeded by Lord Seymour; George Agar-Ellis
