= Strutt & Parker =

UK property consultancy

Strutt & Parker is one of the largest property consultancies in the UK with a network of 60 offices, 10 in prime central London.

It was founded in 1885, by the partnership of two friends, Hon. Edward Gerald Strutt and Charles Alfred Parker.

In 2017 Strutt & Parker was acquired by BNP Paribas Real Estate, part of the BNP Paribas Group.
