= Charlotte Strutt, 1st Baroness Rayleigh =

British peeress (1758–1836)

The Right Honourable The Baroness Rayleigh

Baroness Rayleigh
- In office 18 July 1821 – 13 September 1836
- Preceded by: New creation
- Succeeded by: John Strutt

Personal details
- Born: Lady Charlotte Mary Gertrude FitzGerald; 29 May 1758
- Died: 13 September 1836 (aged 78) Bath, Somerset, England
- Spouse: Joseph Strutt (m. 1789)
- Children: 3
- Parents: James FitzGerald, 1st Duke of Leinster; Lady Emily Lennox
- Relatives: Charles Lennox, 2nd Duke of Richmond (maternal grandfather); Charles II of England (great-great-grandfather)
- Occupation: Peeress

Charlotte Mary Gertrude Strutt, 1st Baroness Rayleigh (29 May 1758 – 13 September 1836), known as Lady Charlotte FitzGerald from 1758 to 1789 and as Lady Charlotte Strutt from 1789 to 1821, was a British peeress.

== Early life ==
Charlotte was the daughter of James FitzGerald, 1st Duke of Leinster, and his wife, Lady Emily, daughter of Charles Lennox, 2nd Duke of Richmond, and the second of the famous Lennox sisters. Lord Edward FitzGerald and Charles FitzGerald, 1st Baron Lecale, were her brothers. Through her mother she was a descendant of King Charles II.

== Personal life ==
In Toulouse on 23 February 1789 Charlotte married Joseph Strutt, later Member of Parliament for Maldon and the member of an Essex family that had made their fortune from its milling business. The couple had three surviving children, a son, John (later the second Baron Rayleigh), and two daughters, including:

- Hon. Emily Anne Strutt (1790–1864), who died unmarried.
- John James Strutt, 2nd Baron Rayleigh (1796–1873), who married Clara Elizabeth La Touche Vicars, daughter of Capt. Richard Vicars, in 1842.
- Hon. Charlotte Olivia Strutt (c. 1798–1897), who married Rev. Robert Drummond, son of Adm. Sir Adam Drummond, 7th of Megginch and Lady Charlotte Murray (eldest daughter of the 4th Duke of Atholl), in 1841.
- William Henry Strutt (1800–1805), who died young.

Lady Rayleigh died in Bath in September 1836, aged 78, and was succeeded in the barony by her son, John. Joseph Strutt died in 1845.

=== Peerage ===
Her husband was offered a peerage for his services in the Army and Parliament but refused, and instead proposed that the honour be given to his wife. Hence, on 18 July 1821 Charlotte was raised to the peerage as Baroness Rayleigh, of Terling Place in the County of Essex.

== Notes ==
Peerage of the United Kingdom
| New creation | Baroness Rayleigh; 1821–1836 | Succeeded by John James Strutt |
