= Terling =

Village in Essex, England

Coordinates: 51.806°N 0.564°E

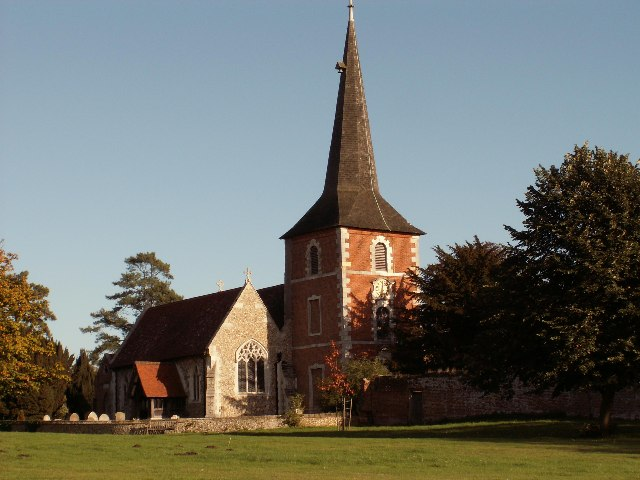
- All Saints' Church, Terling

- Location within Essex
- Population: 765 (Parish, 2021)
- OS grid reference: TL767150
- District: Braintree
- Shire county: Essex
- Region: East
- Country: England
- Sovereign state: United Kingdom
- Post town: Chelmsford
- Postcode district: CM3
- Police: Essex
- Fire: Essex
- Ambulance: East of England
- UK Parliament: Witham

Terling (pronounced Ter-ling) is a village and civil parish in the county of Essex, England, between Braintree to the north, Chelmsford to the south-west and Witham to the east. At the 2021 census the parish had a population of 765.

== History ==
A settlement at Terling dates back to Roman times. According to a Saxon document dated 627 AD, about seven hundred acres of land was occupied in the Terling and Fairstead area. In 886 Terling was part of the Witham Hundred and there are references to this in records of Terling and Fairstead until the nineteenth century.

Terling is named in the Domesday Book of 1086 as Tarlinga, giving the approximate population as one hundred and twenty five. Before the Norman Conquest the three manors of Terling were presented to the Abbot of Ely. During the thirteenth century successive Bishops of Norwich acquired land in the Parish, by 1238 known as Tarlinges, and the remains of the foundations of their palace exist to the west of All Saints’ Church. Henry VII later used the palace as a hunting lodge.

During the fourteenth century more people were encouraged to take up farming and names of the farmers who purchased holdings at this time are remembered to this day in place names such as Loyes, Scarletts and Porridge Pot.

Arable farming and sheep rearing were the basis of the village economy in the sixteenth century. Other local industries included tanning, weaving, malting and the milling of flour. Houses of the period were made of timber and clay and were thatched.

Although yet un-standardised, by 1718 the spelling Tarling(e) was most common . It is unclear when the present-day spelling Terling became pre-eminent in documents and maps, but the change came about over the course of the 18th century. For example, Robert Morden's 1722 map of Essex, and Emanuel Bowen's map of 1724 spell the name as Tarling, along with other placenames that are rendered in a phonetic spelling that accords with their pronunciation but, like Terling, is at variance with their modern spelling. Herman Moll's map of 1733 introduces another variant, spelling it Tarleing. A later 18th-century map of Essex located in the Moot Hall in Maldon hedges its bets naming the village as Tarling or Terling, but defers to the phonetic spelling in naming Tarling Hall. A map of the Chelmsford and Witham Hundreds, dedicated to Sir William Mildmay Bt (of the Mildmay Baronets) in 1768 names the village as Tarling.

John Strutt, the second Baron Rayleigh, built the village school, enlarged the church and, in 1868, after a terrible epidemic of typhoid fever, installed a village water supply system.

Since 2002 Terling has been the location of the Terling International Trifle Festival, held each year in September.

Terling was named as Essex Village of the Year in 2017.

== The village ==
The village is split into two halves by the river Ter. P H Reaney suggests that the name of the river is a back-formation, taking its name from the settlement, rather than the other way round . On the West side of the river there is a cricket pitch, tennis courts, swimming pool and playground. On the East side of the river is the village's single public house, the Rayleigh Arms (commonly known as the Monkey), as well as a tearoom, the village shop and post office, the Terling Primary School and the Anglican Church.

== Population ==
In 2021 the population was 765. The population had been 741 in 1991 and 764 in 2011.

== Notable buildings ==
The manor house, Terling Place, was built between 1772 and 1777.

The Terling windmill, latterly converted to residential use, was featured in the 1937 film Oh, Mr Porter!.

The Anglican church dedicated to All Saints is located on the village green. The body of the church is medieval, restored in the 19th century, while the brick-built tower dates from 1732.
