= Henri Reynders =

Belgian priest

Orders
- Ordination: 1928

Personal details
- Born: October 24, 1903
- Died: October 26, 1981 (aged 78)
- Education: Catholic University of Leuven

Henri Reynders (Dom Bruno) with some of the Jewish children he saved during World War II

Henri Reynders (Dom Bruno) (24 October 1903 – 26 October 1981) was a Belgian priest credited with saving 400 Jews during the Holocaust.

== Early life and study ==
Henri Reynders was the fifth of eight children of an upper-middle-class, deeply religious Catholic family. At the age of seventeen, having completed classical Greek and Latin studies at a Catholic school, he was accepted as a postulant at the Benedictine Mont-César Abbey (now known as Keizersberg Abbey) in Leuven, Belgium. After the successful completion of the noviciate in 1922, Henri Reynders was given the name of Dom Bruno.

The next three years were devoted to studying theology and philosophy at the Catholic University of Leuven and at Saint Anselm Athenaeum in Rome. Dom Bruno took the Benedictine vows in Rome in 1925, binding himself to a monastic life at Mont-César and obedience to its abbot. Mont-César was known as an "intellectual abbey" and Dom Bruno was allowed to complete his studies concentrating on the writings of Saint Irenaeus, a second-century Father of the Church. He was ordained a priest in 1928 in Leuven, and the University of Leuven awarded Dom Bruno a Doctorate in Theology three years later.

Asked to lecture on theological dogma to the Mont-César community, Dom Bruno proved to be a non-conformist teacher, much to the dismay of his more conservative abbot. Typically, during one of his lectures, he presented for consideration the views of Martin Luther. His lecturing duties were cut short, the maverick monk was given a new assignment: mentor of the young son of the Duc de Guise, a claimant to the throne of France, living in Belgium. In recalling this unhappy episode years later, Dom Bruno laughingly exclaimed, "Me, an anarchist, teaching a prince!" Eventually, Dom Bruno resumed teaching at his monastery and contributed articles to publications devoted to ancient and medieval theology.

With the abbot's approval, he travelled extensively within and outside Belgium, visiting Catholic institutions to lecture and exchange views. During a stay in Hitler's Germany lecturing Catholic youths, he first witnessed what he would later characterise as the "shocking, revolting and nauseating" injustice and brutality of Nazi anti-Semitism.

During his studies in Rome, Dom Bruno met and became an enthusiastic supporter of the controversial Dom Lambert Beauduin, founder and prior of the Benedictine Amay Priory (later transferred to Chevetogne), Belgium. Dom Lambert promoted the unification of all Christian churches as well as liturgical reforms, ideas that were later favoured in Vatican II but were not fully accepted by the Catholic Church at the time. Consequently, Dom Bruno was advised to discontinue contacts with Chevetogne.

== World War II ==
In the wake of the 1939 German invasion of Poland, which sparked World War II, Belgium mobilised and Dom Bruno was assigned to be the chaplain of the 41st Artillery Regiment. In May of the following year, German troops overran Belgium. In the course of the campaign, he sustained a leg injury and spent the next six months in prisoner-of-war camps at Wolfsburg and Doessel, Germany, where he continued to provide religious and moral support to fellow prisoners. Upon his release, Dom Bruno returned to Mont-César in German-occupied Belgium and resumed his teaching activities.

Compelled by his hostility toward the German occupation and Nazism, Dom Bruno made contact with elements of the Belgian Resistance and assisted in the escape of British pilots shot down over Belgian territory. In 1942, the Nazi authorities began rounding up Jews in Belgium for deportation to the death camps. On orders of his superior, Dom Bruno proceeded to the hamlet of Hodbomont to act as chaplain at a home for the blind. The priest soon became aware that the home was being used as a hiding place for a number of Jewish adults and children, brought there by a group of Christians opposed to the Nazi policies. The leader of the group was a prominent lawyer, Albert van den Berg, with whom Dom Bruno became a close collaborator. When it became unsafe to continue hiding Jews at this location, the home was closed and its occupants dispersed to other locations. Dom Bruno returned to Mont-César and dedicated himself exclusively to finding places of refuge for Jews.

In undertaking the dangerous mission of rescuing as many Jews as possible from deportation, Dom Bruno found support among fellow monks at Mont-César, higher-ups in the Belgian church hierarchy, and even several family members, including his young nephew Michel Reynders (who was later knighted in Belgium). He built an underground network by establishing contacts with a number of existing resistance groups and individuals similarly engaged in rescue work. Several of these individuals, including van den Berg, paid with their lives for these humanitarian activities. Dom Bruno's major effort was finding families and institutions willing to hide Jews, especially Jewish children, in spite of the obvious risks. In this, he was most successful by appealing to the prospects' Christian faith and values. Consequently, many of the cooperating institutions were Catholic boarding schools, usually operating within the walls of convents or monasteries. Dom Bruno would personally accompany "his children" to their new homes or move them to new locations to prevent suspicion among villagers.

He would frequently visit these children, providing a link with their parents, who were also hiding, when not deported, as was often the case. In addition to building and running his "underground railroad", Dom Bruno ensured that his charges were provided with false identification, including non-Jewish-sounding names and fake ration cards, as well as financial assistance to the rescuers. These logistical concerns could only be met with the willing but risky cooperation of numerous city officials, civil servants, and generous donors. The Gestapo got wind of Father Bruno's activities and raided Mont César Abbey in 1944. Fortunately, Dom Bruno was away at the time. Following the unsuccessful raid, the monk went into hiding, trading his habit for civilian garb and sporting a beret to hide his tonsure.

A fellow monk at the abbey provided him with several skilfully forged identification cards. Often using a bicycle and in spite of subsequent close calls, Dom Bruno continued his dangerous mission of mercy for the duration of the Nazi occupation.

== After World War II ==
Following the liberation of Belgium in September 1944, Dom Bruno assisted in reuniting the children with their parents or other members of their immediate family. Problems arose when representatives of the Jewish community opposed attempts by some Christians to adopt orphaned Jewish children, especially since many of these children requested baptism as a result of their Catholic experience. During the Nazi occupation, Dom Bruno opposed the active conversion of his charges, but afterwards took the position that each case should be evaluated individually, with the best interest of the child being the deciding factor.

As the war against Germany was still in progress, Dom Bruno rejoined the Belgian armed forces as a chaplain. At the war's end, he briefly returned to Mont-César, but was reassigned by his order to perform pastoral and educational work at other locations in Belgium, France and Rome. No longer burdened by his wartime self-imposed rescue mission, Dom Bruno resumed his studies of Saint Irenaeus' legacy and in 1954 published the definitive lexicon on the subject.

Attracted by the ecumenical spirit of Chevetogne Abbey, where, as a young priest, he had become a disciple of Dom Lambert Beauduin, Dom Bruno had, over the years, requested a release from the Mont-César community in order to join the monks at Chevetogne. That request had been repeatedly denied by his abbot. Finally, in 1968, his wish was granted. His final active assignment was as vicar in the town of Ottignies near Louvain, where he ministered to the aged, the sick, and the handicapped.

In 1964, the state of Israel proclaimed Dom Bruno Reynders one of the "Righteous Among the Nations", an honour bestowed on gentiles who risked their lives to help Jews during the Holocaust. He was invited to Jerusalem to witness the planting of a tree in his honour at Yad Vashem (Alley of the Righteous). Gradually worsening Parkinson's disease forced Dom Bruno to retire to a nursing home in 1975. Six years later, he sustained a severe bone fracture and did not survive surgery. He was buried at his beloved Abbey of Chevetogne.

Ten years after Father Bruno's death, a square in the city of Ottignies was named in his honour. A stele was erected which reads:

Father Bruno Reynders, Benedictine (1903-1981). Hero of the resistance. At the risk of his life saved some 400 Jews from Nazi barbarism

== Sources ==
- Resistance - Pere Bruno Reynders by Johannes Blum. A French monograph containing documents, notes, testimonials, and photographs. Published June 1993 by “ Les Carrefours de la Cité ”, 29b. Avenue Gen. Lartigue, 1200 Bruxelles, Belgique.
- The Path of the Righteous - Gentile Rescuers of Jews During the Holocaust by Mordecai Paldiel.
- The Righteous - The Unsung Heroes of the Holocaust by Sir Martin Gilbert.
- Faith under Fire: Stories of Hope and Courage from World War II by Steve Rabey
- Lexique comparé du texte grec et des versions latine, arménniene et syriac de l'Adversus heareses de Saint Irénée by Bruno Reynders
