= Keizersberg Abbey =

Benedictine monastery in Leuven, Belgium

Coordinates: 50.8885°N 4.6966°E

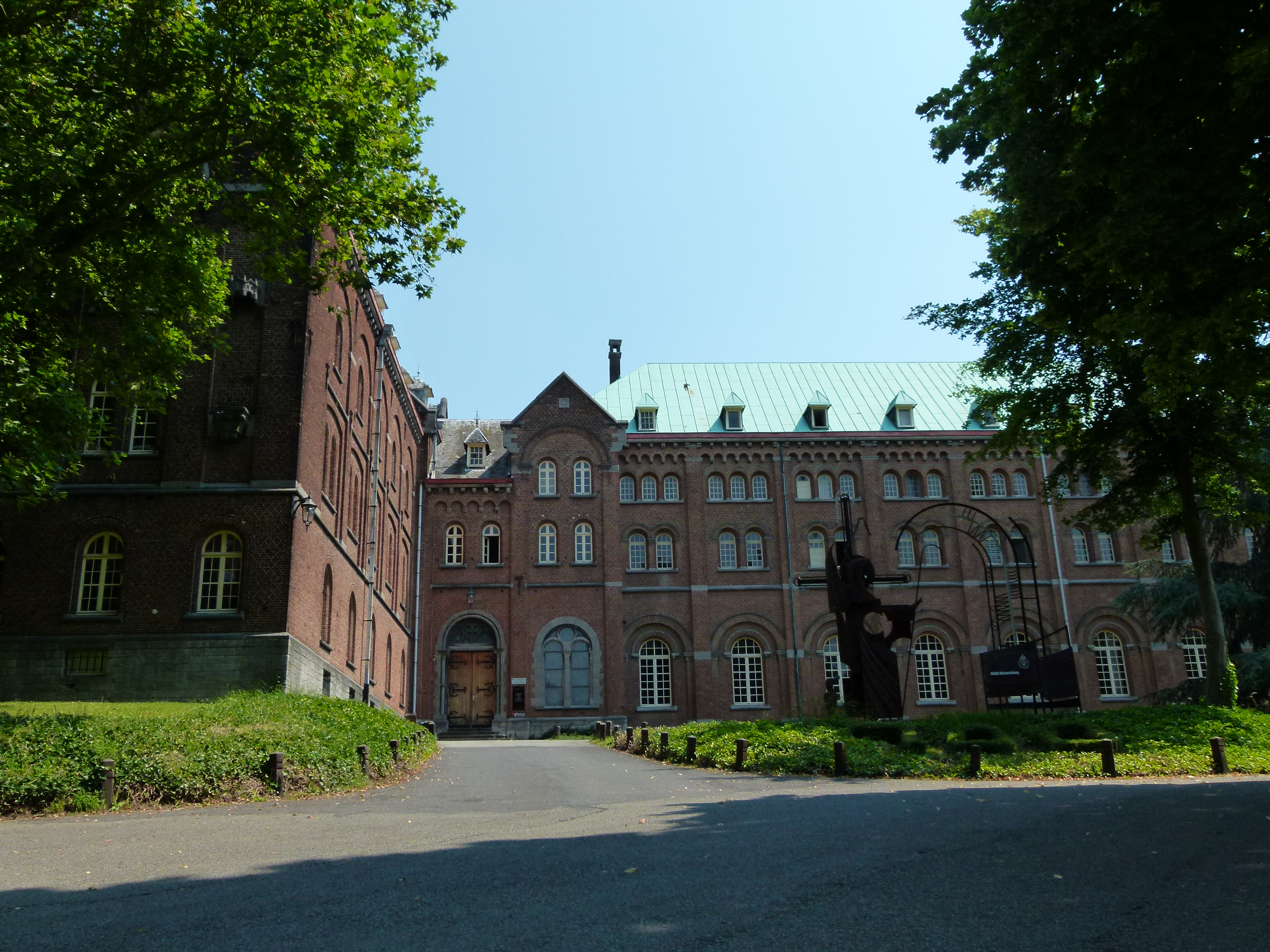
Front view of the abbey

Keizersberg Abbey, in Dutch the Abdij Keizersberg, is a former Benedictine monastery on the Keizersberg hill situated in the north of the Flemish town Leuven in Belgium.

== History ==
=== The site ===
The Keizersberg (the 'Emperor's mountain') is a hill situated close to the point where the Voer river flows into the Dijle river north of Leuven. Emperor Arnulf of Carinthia had a fortification built here following the 891 Battle of Leuven, in which East Francia defeated the Vikings.

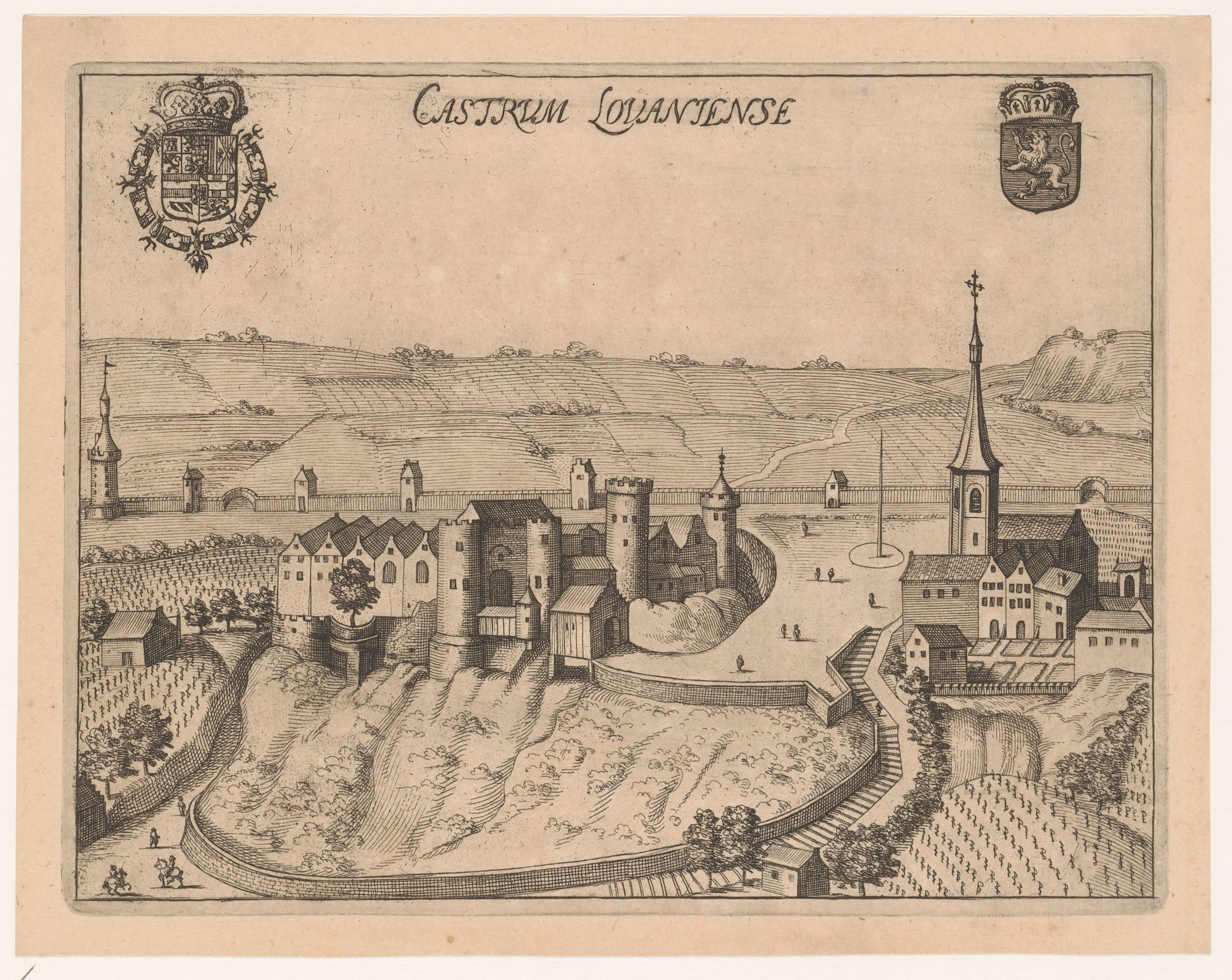
Keizersberg Castle and the commandery in 1659

When Leuven became the first capital of the Duchy of Brabant, the Duke of Brabant Henry I had in 1230 a castle built on the Keizersberg outside the city walls to demonstrate the dukes' power. In the early 16th century, when the later Emperor Charles V was still a child he regularly stayed at the castle on the Keizersberg with his sisters. The future Pope Adrian VI gave him instructions there. A small zoo was set up for the children, featuring at least a wild cow, a bear and two camels. While Charles did not regularly visit Leuven after being crowned as emperor, he provided the funds to renovate and embellish the castle. As a result, the site came to be known as the Castrum Caesaris – the emperor's castle. The castle, which had fallen into ruins, was demolished in 1782 by order of the Austrian Emperor Joseph II, the then ruler over the Austrian Netherlands.

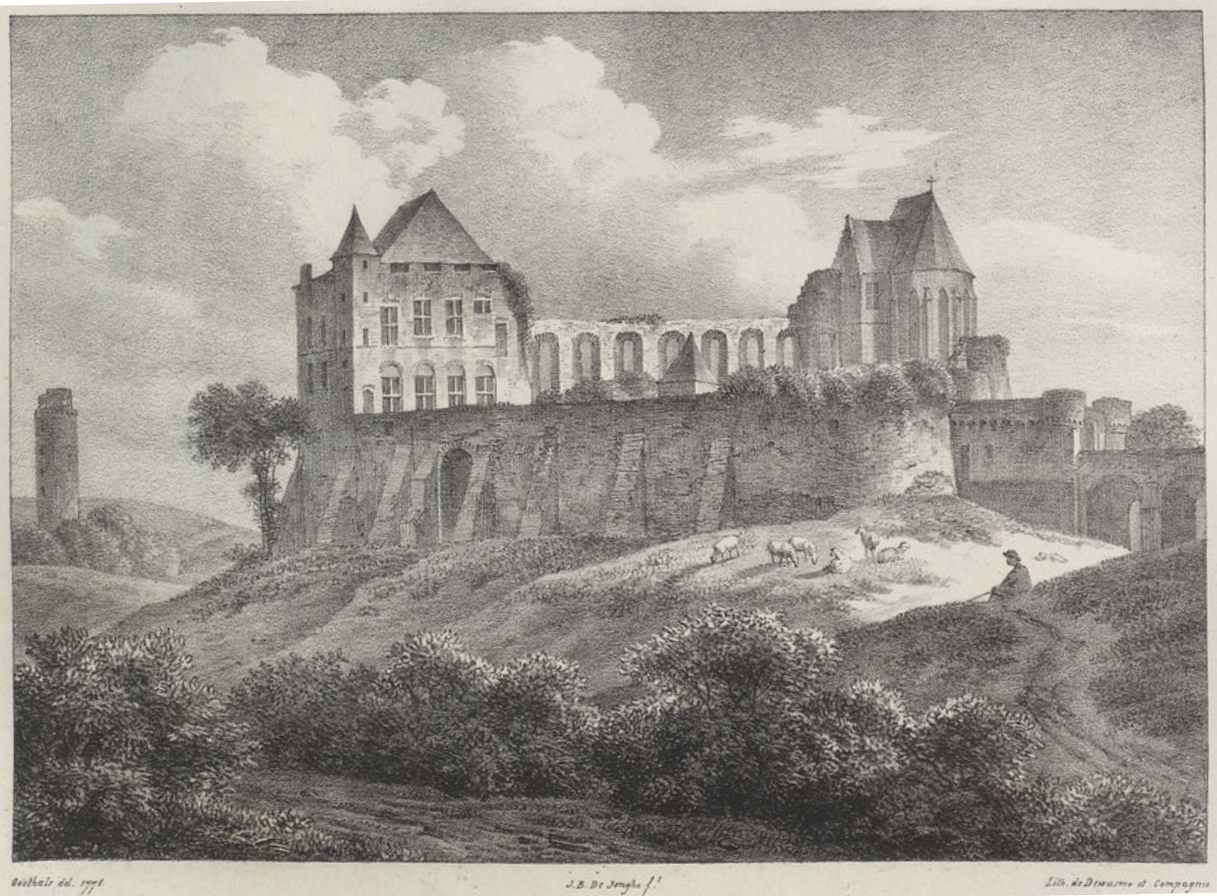
The Keizersberg in 1778

On the east side of the hill the Knights Templars had built a commandery and a chapel in 1187. Upon the Templars' dissolution in 1312 their buildings were taken over by the Knights Hospitallers. In 1626, they also left. The chapel which had been turned into a church remained in use until 1799, first by Irish Jesuits and later by Dominicans. In 1798 the French occupiers expropriated and sold the commandery and the church and larger buildings were demolished.

=== Beuron Congregation ===
A Benedictine house of studies was established in Leuven in 1888 by Dom Gerard van Caloen, rector of the abbey school of Maredsous Abbey, and land was acquired on the present site in the following year for the construction of a larger establishment, in which the remains of the old commandery were incorporated. The first major conventual block, the north wing, was completed in 1897. The abbey was formally founded on 13 April 1899 as part of the Beuron Congregation, under the first abbot, Dom Robertus de Kerchove. By 1899 fourteen monks had moved into the north wing of the new abbey, which was officially named Abbatia Reginae Coeli de Castro Lovaniensi.

Columba Marmion, was abbot of Maredsous and also appointed prior of the Keizersberg Abbey in 1906, which he remained until his death in 1923.

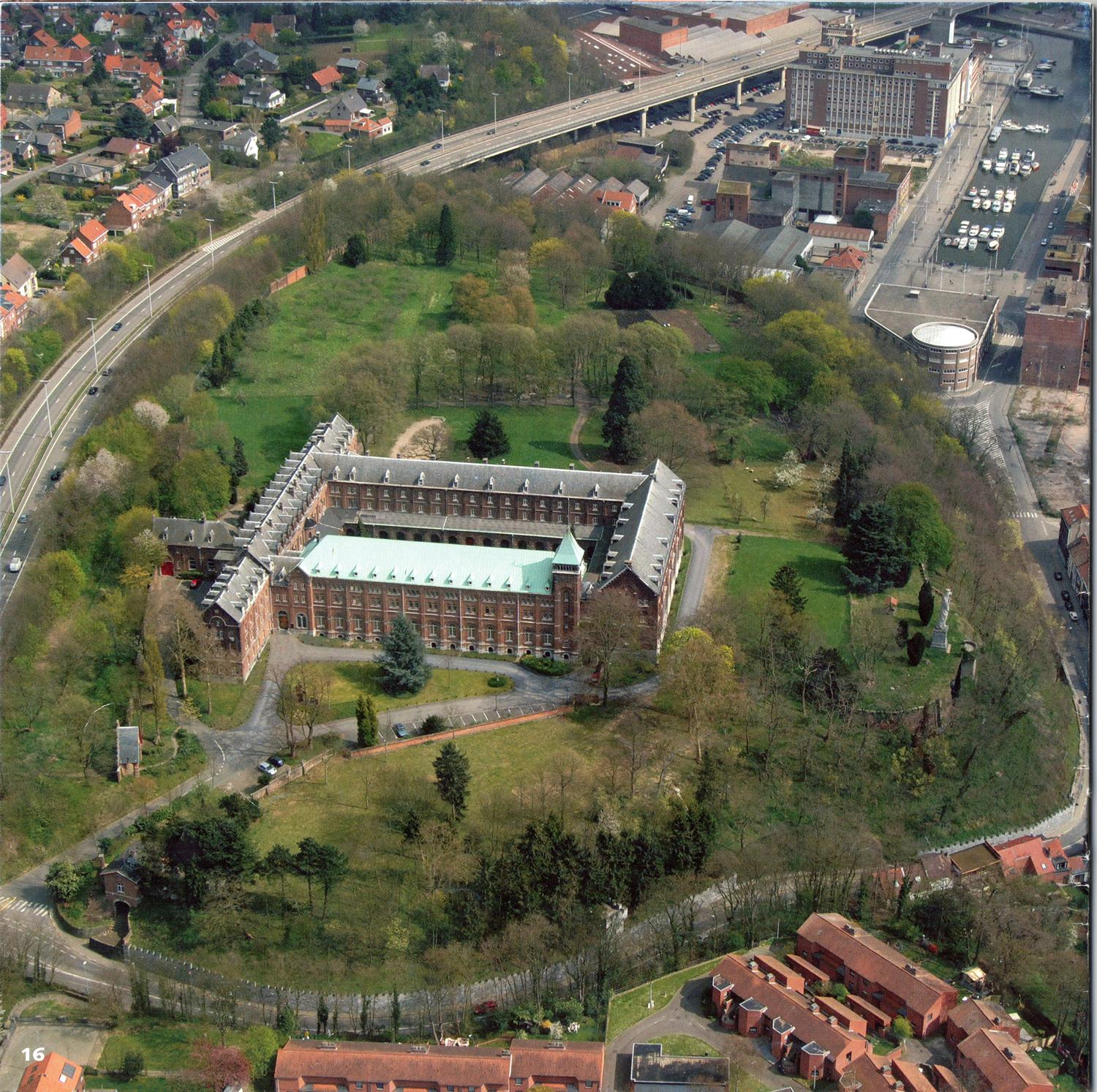
Bird's eye view of the Keizersberg Abbey in 2007

The Abbey was connected both with the Blessed Columba and with the reformer and ecumenist Dom Lambert Beauduin, who while a member of this community launched a liturgical movement in 1909 and began publishing the accompanying periodical Les Questions Liturgiques et Paroissiales the following year. Dom Lambert left Keizersberg Abbey in 1925 to become prior of Amay Priory, established from the Keizersberg Abbey. From there he later founded Chevetogne Abbey.

In 1914 the buildings were severely damaged by fire, and the monks took refuge in another Beuronese house, Maria Laach Abbey in the Rhineland, until after the end of the war.

=== Belgian Congregation ===
In 1921 the abbey moved from the Beuron Congregation to become part of the new Belgian Congregation of Our Lady (Belgische Congregatie van Onze-Lieve-Vrouw-Boodschap), under the presidency of Abbot Robertus. In 1929 publication began of the theological journal "Recherches de Théologie Ancienne et Médiévale".

Dom Bruno (Henri Reynders), famous for hiding many Jewish children from the Nazis during World War II, was a monk of Mont César from 1922 until 1968. A fellow monk at the abbey provided him with several skillfully forged identification cards.

The abbey again suffered damage in World War II with the bombing of the buildings during air raids on Leuven in 1944, which among other things destroyed the last remains of the older buildings from the time of the Hospitallers, and the monastery was temporarily uninhabitable.

By 1948 it was sufficiently restored to be able to set up a small community at Wavreumont in Stavelot, which was formally established as St. Remaclus' Priory on 21 June 1952.

=== Subiaco Congregation ===
In 1968 the Catholic University of Leuven became an institution using only Dutch as the language of instruction. Around this time it was decided that the abbey should become a Flemish institution and on 10 June 1968 the abbey was transferred to the Flemish Province of the Subiaco Congregation. The abbot and prior resigned in the same year, and a temporary administrator was appointed.

In 1969 part of the renovated abbey was converted for use as student accommodation, and is still used for that purpose. As the monastic community continued to dwindle, the abbey was leased to Labora, an organisation that is revitalising the site. Parts of the abbey are being systematically renovated for commercial use.

In 2020, a part of the Medieval wall collapsed.

== Abbots ==
- Robertus de Kerchove 1899-1928
- Bernard Capelle 1928-1952
- Rombout Van Doren 1952-1968

Filips De Cloedt (acting abbot-administrator) 1968-1970

- Ambroos Verheul 1970-1991

Livien Bauwens (acting prior-administrator) 1991-1993

- Kris Op de Beeck 1993-2017
- Dom Dirk Hanssens, prior-administrator after 2018
