= Rallis =

Greek and English noble family

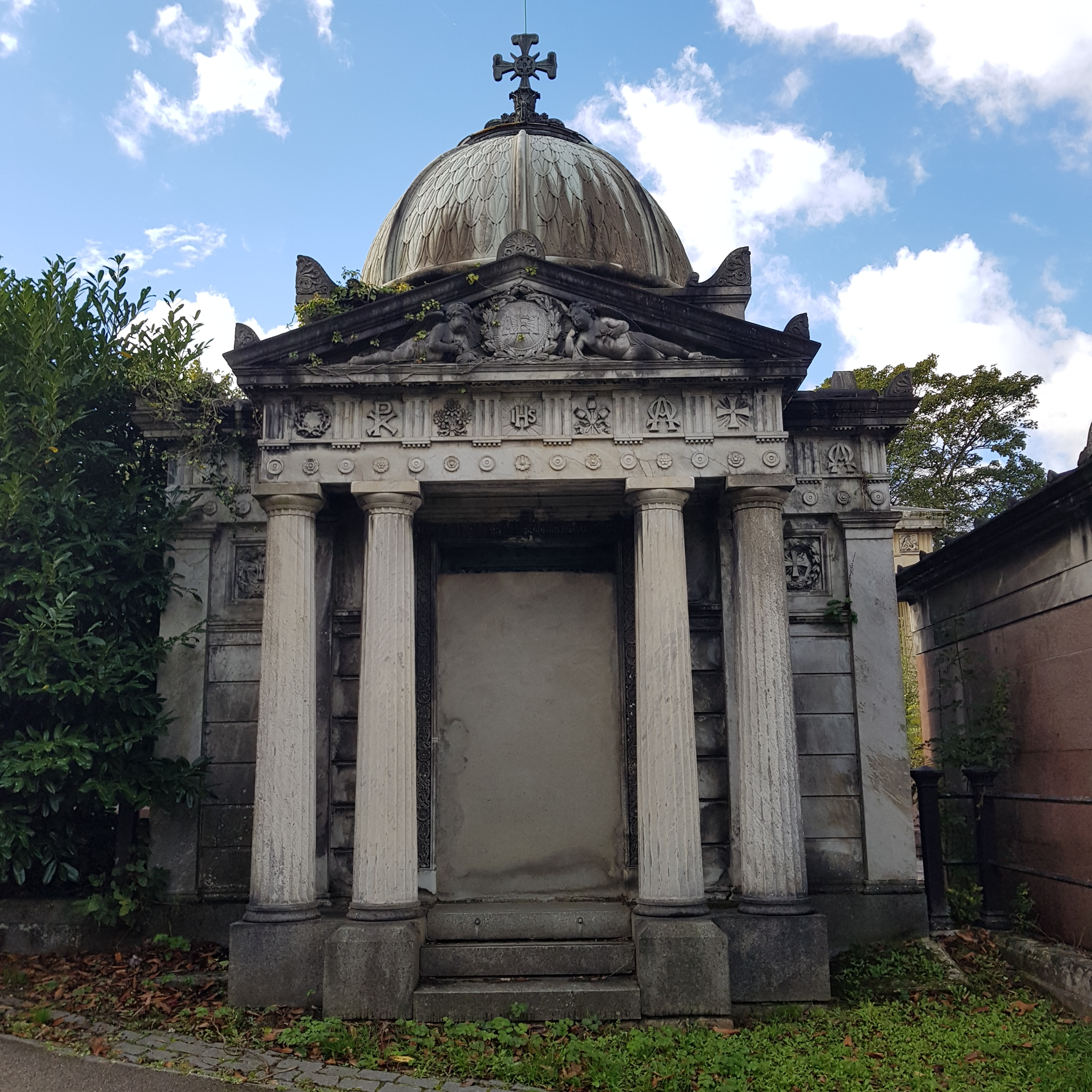
Rallis family mausoleum in West Norwood Cemetery, London

The Rallis family, also spelled Ralli, Ralles or Rallet in Romanian is the name of an old Greek Phanariote family, whose members played important political role in the history of modern Greece, Danubian Principalities and later in the United Kingdom. The Ralli nobles of Chios, living in Great Britain, gained the title of Baronet in 1912 and thus became the Ralli baronets. They claim descent from the Frankish-Byzantine noble Raoul/Ralles family.

== From the Athenian branch ==
- Dimitrios Rallis (1844–1921), Prime Minister of Greece 1897
- Georgios Rallis (1918–2006), Prime Minister of Greece 1980–1981
- Ioannis Rallis (1878–1946), Prime Minister of Greece 1943–1944

== From the Chios branch ==
- Ralli Brothers, expatriate Greek family and merchant business in Victorian-era England
- Pandeli Ralli (1845–1928), British Member of Parliament
- Ralli baronets, title in the Baronetage of the United Kingdom, created in 1912 for Lucas Ralli
- Théodore Ralli (1852–1909), Greek-French orientalist painter
- Loukas Ralli (c.1794–1879), Mayor of Piraeus 1855–1866
- Constantine Scaramanga-Ralli (1854–1934), author and British Member of Parliament

== Other people ==
- Aldo Ralli (1935–2016), Italian actor
- Dionysus Rallis, Metropolitan of Tarnovo and leader of the First Tarnovo Uprising
- Evangelos Rallis, Greek tennis player who competed at the 1896 Summer Olympics in Athens
- Giovanna Ralli (born 1935), Italian actress
- Sophia Ralli (born 1988), Greek alpine skier who competed at the 2010 Winter Olympics
- Stephen Rallis (1942–2012), American mathematician
- Zamfir Ralli-Arbore (1848–1933), Romanian political activist
- Nick Rallis (born 1993), American football coach

== See also ==
- Ralli (disambiguation)
- Rallis Kopsidis (1929–2010), Greek painter and writer
