= Raleigh (name) =

Origin
- Origin: Old English, Irish

Other names
- Related names: Rawle, Rawleigh, Riley, Rylee, Ryleigh

Raleigh is a gender-neutral, British-originated name meaning "deer's meadow". In 2021, it ranked as the 2242nd most popular given name for all genders. The surname Raleigh originates from the English county of Devon, and is now the 7067th most popular surname in the United States.

== Notable people with the given name "Raleigh" include ==
- Raleigh Aitchison (1887–1958), American baseball player
- Rawle Alkins (born 1997), American basketball player
- Raleigh DeGeer Amyx (1938–2019), American artifact collector
- Rawle Barrow (1934–2014), Trinidadian sailor
- Raleigh Black (1880–1963), Australian botanist
- Rawle Brancker (1937–2021), Barbadian cricketer
- Raleigh Brown (1921–2009), American politician
- Raleigh Chichester-Constable (1890–1963), English soldier
- Rawle Clarke (born 1952), Barbadian sprinter
- Raleigh E. Colston (1825–1896), French-American professor
- Rawle Cox (born 1960), American field hockey player
- Raleigh Croshaw (1584–1624), English merchant
- Rawle Douglin, Trinidadian priest
- Raleigh Drennon (1908–1965), American football player
- Raleigh W. Falbe (1890–1957), American politician and police officer
- Raleigh Gilbert (1936–1998), British commentator
- Raleigh Kirby Godsey (born 1936), American academic administrator
- Raleigh Grey (1860–1936), British colonist
- Rawle Marshall (born 1982), Guyanese-American basketball player
- Raleigh McKenzie (born 1963), American football player
- Raleigh Moncrief, American musician
- Raleigh Rhodes (1918–2007), American soldier
- Raleigh Roundtree (born 1965), American football player
- Raleigh Ashlin Skelton (1906–1970), English historian
- Raleigh Trevelyan (1923–2014), British author
- Rawleigh Warner Jr. (1921–2013), American business executive
- Raleigh Webb (born 1997), American football player
- Rawleigh Williams III (born 1996), American football player

== Notable people with the surname "Raleigh" include ==
- Andy Raleigh (born 1981), English rugby league footballer
- Ben Raleigh (1913–1997), American composer
- Cal Raleigh (born 1996), American baseball player
- Carew Raleigh (1550–1625), English naval commander
- Carew Raleigh (1605–1666), English politician
- Cecil Raleigh (1856–1914), English actor and playwright
- David Raleigh, American singer-songwriter
- Don Raleigh (1926–2012), Canadian ice hockey player
- Donald Raleigh (disambiguation), multiple people
- Elizabeth Raleigh (1565–1647), English courtier
- Gilbert Raleigh (1622–1675), English politician
- Gregory Raleigh (born 1961), American inventor
- Jack Raleigh (1890–??), Irish hurler
- John Raleigh (1887–1955), American baseball player
- Justin Raleigh, American make-up artist
- Katherine Raleigh (1852–1922), English classics scholar, suffragist and tax resister
- Kevin Raleigh (born 1952), American singer
- Thomas Raleigh (1850–1920), British lawyer
- Todd Raleigh (born 1969), American college baseball coach
- Saba Raleigh (1862–1923), English actress
- Sim Raleigh (1909–1934), English footballer
- Wally Raleigh (1895–1960), Australian rules footballer
- Walter Raleigh (disambiguation), multiple people

== See also ==
- Raleigh, North Carolina, a page for the capital of North Carolina
- Raleigh (disambiguation), a disambiguation page for "Raleigh"
