= Rally =

Rally or rallye may refer to:

== Gatherings ==
- Political demonstration, a political rally, a political demonstration of support or protest, march, or parade
- Pep rally, an event held at a North American school or college sporting event

== Sports ==
- Rallying, a category of motorsport
- Rally (tennis), a sequence of shots in tennis
- Rally obedience (also rally-O), a dog sport
- Rally scoring, a point scoring system common in racket and net sports
  - Rally point system, the system of scoring points in volleyball
- Rally Cycling, a UCI ProTeam professional road cycling squad

== Vehicles ==
- SOCATA Rallye, a French-built light aircraft
- Rotec Rally, an American ultralight aircraft
- Automobiles Rally, a defunct French sports cars manufacturer

== Other uses ==
- Rally Road Racers, a 2023 CG-animated film
- "Rally (How I Met Your Mother)", a 2014 episode of the TV series How I Met Your Mother
- Rally's, another brand of the American fast-food restaurant chain Checkers
- Windows Rally, a network simplification technology produced by Microsoft
- Rally Software, a web-based project management tool, owned by Broadcom Inc.
- Rally (stock market), a sudden, significant rise in the price of an individual security or in the market as a whole
- Rally (investment company), an alternative asset investment company which allows users to buy and sell equity shares in collectible assets
- Rally.org, a social online fundraising platform
- The Rally (New Caledonia), a conservative political party
- RALLY, a fourth-generation programming language created by Digital Equipment Corporation for the OpenVMS platform.
- Terminal lucidity, also known as the rally or rallying
- Rally, an in-game event in the Knockout Tour in Mario Kart World
- Rally (pinball company), a French pinball company

== See also ==
- Raleigh (disambiguation)
- Rayleigh (disambiguation)
