= Ralli =

Ralli may refer to:

== People ==
- Rallis or Ralli, a surname, including a list of people with the name
- Ralli Ben-Yehuda (born 1934), Israeli Olympic gymnast
- Théodore Ralli (1852-1909), Greek artist

== Other uses ==
- Ralli car, a type of horse-drawn cart
- Ralli Hall, a venue in Hove, England
- Ralli Museum (Caesarea), two art museums (Ralli 1 and Ralli 2) in Caesarea, Israel
- Ralli quilt, traditional quilts from Sindh, Pakistan and western India
- Ralli (suborder), a suborder of the bird order Gruiformes
- Spermophilus ralli, a squirrel of family Sciuridae

== See also ==
- Rally (disambiguation)
