= Raleigh (disambiguation) =

Raleigh is the capital city of the U.S. state of North Carolina, named after Sir Walter Raleigh.

Raleigh may also refer to:

== Places ==
=== Australia ===
- Raleigh, New South Wales, a town

=== Canada ===
- Raleigh, Newfoundland and Labrador, a town

=== United Kingdom ===
- Raleigh, Pilton, a historic manor in North Devon

=== United States ===
- Raleigh, Florida, a census-designated place
- Raleigh, Georgia, an unincorporated community
- Raleigh, Illinois, a village
- Raleigh, Indiana, an unincorporated community
- Raleigh, Iowa, an unincorporated community
- Raleigh, Mississippi, a town
- Raleigh, North Dakota, a census-designated place
- Raleigh, Memphis, a neighborhood of Memphis, Tennessee
- Raleigh County, West Virginia, a county
  - Raleigh, West Virginia, an unincorporated community within the county

== Organizations ==
- Raleigh Bicycle Company, a bicycle manufacturer
- Raleigh International, a UK-based educational development charity
- Roman Catholic Diocese of Raleigh, a Roman Catholic diocese that covers the eastern half of the U.S. state of North Carolina

== Ships ==
- CSS Raleigh (1861), a gunboat
- CSS Raleigh (1864), an ironclad ram
- HMS Raleigh (1806), an 18-gun Cruizer class brig-sloop
- HMS Raleigh (1845), a 50-gun fourth rate
- HMS Raleigh (1873), an iron screw frigate
- HMS Raleigh (1919), a Hawkins-class heavy cruiser
- HMS Raleigh (shore establishment), the basic training establishment of the Royal Navy, in Torpoint
- USS Raleigh (1776), a 32-gun sailing frigate
- USS Raleigh (C-8), a protected cruiser commissioned in 1894
- USS Raleigh (CL-7), a light cruiser commissioned in 1924
- USS Raleigh (LPD-1), an amphibious transport dock in service from 1962 to 1992

== People ==
- Raleigh (name), a page for people with the given and surname "Raleigh"

== Other uses ==
- Raleigh (band), a Canadian experimental indie-rock band from Calgary
- Raleigh (typeface)
- Raleigh Becket, protagonist of the film Pacific Rim

== See also ==
- Raleigh Court, Roanoke, Virginia, a neighborhood
- Raleigh Tavern a historic tavern related to the American Revolution in Colonial Williamsburg, Virginia
- Raleigh Township (disambiguation)
- Rally (disambiguation)
- Rayleigh (disambiguation)
- Sir Walter Raleigh (essay), by Henry David Thoreau
- Sir Walter Raleigh Hotel, a historic hotel in downtown Raleigh, North Carolina
