= Dick Moje =

American football player (1927–1989)

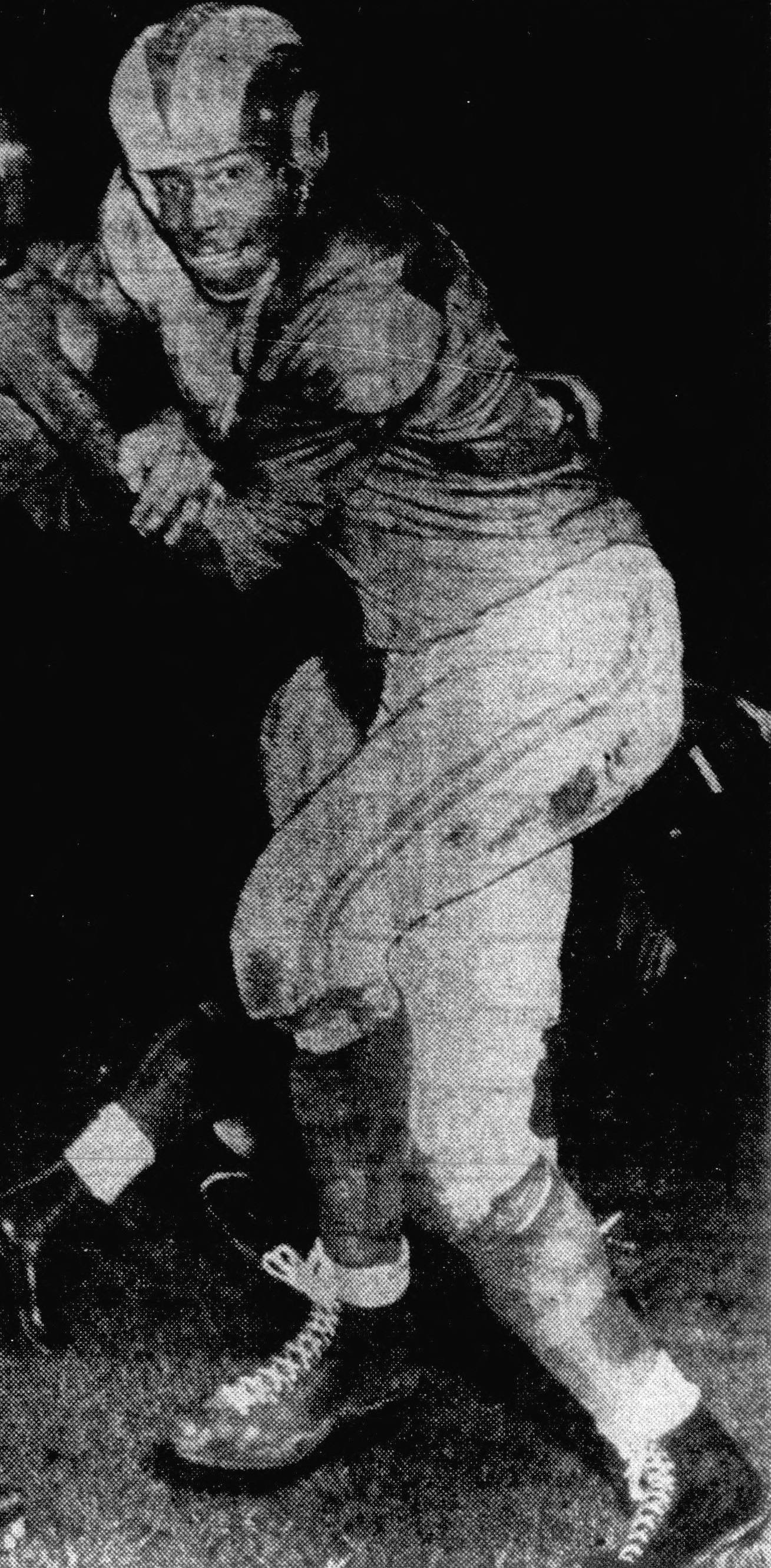
- Moje in 1950

Profile
- Position: End

Personal information
- Born: May 8, 1927; Los Angeles, California, U.S.
- Died: June 22, 1989 (aged 62); Los Angeles, California, U.S.
- Listed height: 6 ft 2 in (1.88 m)
- Listed weight: 210 lb (95 kg)

Career information
- High school: Franklin (Los Angeles, California)
- College: Glendale CC (1946); Loyola (1947–1948)

Career history
- Los Angeles Rams (1950)*; Richmond Rebels (1950); Green Bay Packers (1951)
- * Offseason or practice squad member only

Career statistics
- Receptions: 1
- Receiving yards: 11
- Stats at Pro Football Reference

Richard Louis Moje (May 8, 1927 – June 22, 1989) was an American professional football end. He played college football at Glendale Community College and for the Loyola Lions. After college, he was briefly a member of the Los Angeles Rams of the National Football League (NFL) before joining the Richmond Rebels of the American Football League (AFL). He then returned to the NFL and appeared in two games for the Green Bay Packers during the 1951 season.

== Early life ==
Moje was born on May 8, 1927, in Los Angeles, California. His father was Los Angeles's superintendent of water and power. He attended Franklin High School in Los Angeles where he competed in football and track and field. He was the football team's starting end and helped them go undefeated in 1943 and 1944, earning All-Northern League honors. In track, he competed as a long-distance runner and set the town record in the mile run with a time of 4 minutes, 40 seconds. In 1945, Moje served in the United States Navy. He was stationed at Naval Base San Diego and played for the 1945 San Diego Naval Training Station Bluejackets football team.

== College career ==
Moje enrolled at Glendale Community College in 1946 and played football, with the Pasadena Independent describing him as a "very fine wingman". Moje was named All-Western League for the 1946 season. He then enrolled at Loyola University of Los Angeles (now known as Loyola Marymount University) in 1947. He was a starter at right end for Loyola that year; the Honolulu Star-Bulletin identified Moje as one of the best at his position on the west coast that season. The paper described him as a "fine pass snagger and a bear on defense". He then served as team captain in 1948 before being declared ineligible prior to the 1949 season.

== Professional career and later life ==
Moje signed with the Los Angeles Rams of the NFL on July 25, 1950, before being released on September 6, in part due to an injury. After this, he joined the Richmond Rebels of the AFL. He appeared in eight games, two as a starter, for the league champion Rebels, catching three touchdown passes. He re-signed with the Rams in 1951 before being traded to the Green Bay Packers on September 27. He appeared in two games, both as a backup, for the Packers during the season, catching one pass for 11 yards. He did not return to the Packers in 1952. During his career, he stood at 6 feet 2 inches (1.88 m) and weighed 210 pounds (95 kg).

Moje died on June 22, 1989, in Los Angeles, at the age of 62.
