= Rayleigh =

Rayleigh may refer to:

== Science ==
- Rayleigh scattering
- Rayleigh–Jeans law
- Rayleigh waves
- Rayleigh (unit), a unit of photon flux named after the 4th Baron Rayleigh
- Rayl, rayl or Rayleigh, two units of specific acoustic impedance and characteristic acoustic impedance, named after the 3rd Baron Rayleigh
- Rayleigh criterion in angular resolution
- Rayleigh distribution
- Rayleigh fading
- Rayleigh law on low-field magnetization
- Rayleigh length
- Rayleigh number, a dimensionless number for a fluid associated with buoyancy driven flow
- Rayleigh quotient
- Rayleigh–Ritz method
- Plateau–Rayleigh instability explains why a falling stream of fluid breaks up into smaller packets
- Rayleigh–Taylor instability an instability of an interface between two fluids

== Title of nobility ==
- Baron Rayleigh
  - Charlotte Mary Gertrude Strutt, 1st Baroness Rayleigh
  - John William Strutt, 3rd Baron Rayleigh, physicist, winner of a Nobel Prize in 1904
  - Robert John Strutt, 4th Baron Rayleigh, physicist; son of John William Strutt

== Fictional name ==
- Silvers Rayleigh, a fictional character in One Piece

== Places ==
- Rayleigh, British Columbia, Canada
- Rayleigh, Essex, England
  - Rayleigh (constituency)
- Rayleigh (lunar crater)
- Rayleigh (Martian crater)

== See also ==
- Raleigh (disambiguation) for a different spelling
