= Lambert Beauduin =

Belgian monk and liturgist (1873–1960)

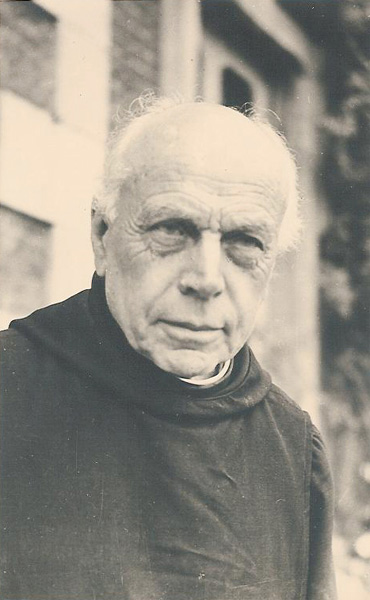
- Born: Octavo Beauduin; August 5, 1873; Rosoux-les-Waremme
- Died: January 11, 1960 (aged 86); Chevetogne
- Occupation: Benedictine monk
- Known for: founded the monastery now known as Chevetogne Abbey

Lambert Beauduin, OSB (August 5, 1873 – January 11, 1960) was a Belgian Benedictine monk who founded the monastery now known as Chevetogne Abbey in 1925. He was a leading member of the Belgian liturgical movement and a pioneer of the European liturgical revival.

== Life ==
Born Octavo Beauduin at Rosoux-les-Waremme on August 5, 1873, his family was of the landed gentry. He studied at the minor seminary at St. Trond and continued at the major seminary of Liège. He was ordained as a priest in 1897. After ordination, he joined the Société des Aumôniers du Travail (Society of Labor Chaplains) where he ministered to working-class people and worked for the improvement of social conditions for industrial workers.

In 1906, he became a monk of the Benedictine Mont César Abbey in Leuven, and was given the name "Lambert". The abbey was then a monastery of the Beuronese Congregation. There he was greatly influenced by the prior, Columba Marmion. He also studied the works of Prosper Guéranger on liturgical prayer and became deeply involved with the liturgical movement in Belgium. In September 1909, Beauduin delivered an address on the liturgy at a congress in Malines, called by Cardinal Désiré-Joseph Mercier.

Beauduin promoted the active participation of people in the Mass by helping them to understand and follow the liturgical rites and texts. While he opposed the use of vernacular language in liturgy, he recommended bilingual books for Mass and Vespers for the laity to replace private devotional prayers. He also closely followed the work of Pope Pius X, particularly in his attempt to redress what he believed was a spiritual malaise among Christians of his day. Beauduin was supported in his work of promoting the liturgy by prominent Catholic layman Godefroid Kurth. The monks at Mont César began to print inexpensive tracts and guides.

During the war, he was a leader of the Belgian underground movement, under the alias "Oscar Fraipont". In 1915, he traveled to England and preached at St Michael's Abbey, Farnborough.

From 1921 to 1925, he was professor of liturgy, apologetics, and ecclesiology at Sant'Anselmo in Rome, where he came to know the Christian East and he realized the extent to which the Churches are divided. An early proponent of ecumenism, he was an important participant and contributor to the Malines Conversations, hosted by Cardinal Mercier, which were a series of discussions between members of the Anglican Church and some Continental Francophone Catholics. In 1925, Beauduin presented a paper L'église anglicane unie, mais non absorbée which presented the argument that the Anglican Church should be “reunited” with—not simply “subsumed” by—the Roman Church.

He then started to work on the foundation of the present monastery at Amay sur Meuse (later Chevetogne) devoted to Christian unity. His efforts resulted in his being transferred to En-Calcat Abbey in Dourgne, where he remained until 1951. Beauduin died at Chevetogne on January 11, 1960.

In 1957, Angelo Roncalli said that he owed his ecumenical vocation to Beauduin.

== Works ==
Beauduin wrote over 200 journal articles, but is probably best known for La Piété de l'Eglise (1914).

== Sources ==
- Louis BOUYER, Dom Lambert Beauduin. Un homme d' Eglise, Casterman, Tournai - Paris, 1964
- Sonya A. QUITSLUND, Beauduin. A prophet vindicated, Newman Press, New York - Toronto, 1973
- Unité des Chrétiens, no. 29, janvier 1978: Dom Lambert Beauduin (1873-1960):le moine de l'Union, ed. Etienne FOUILLOUX & Jacques DESSEAUX
