= Glendale Community College (California) =

Community college in Glendale, California, US

Coordinates: 34°10′01.99″N 118°13′42.17″W

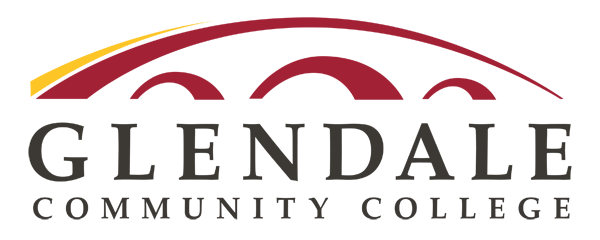
- Former name: Glendale Junior College (1927–1944)
- Motto: How Do You GCC?
- Type: Public community college
- Established: 1927
- Parent institution: California Community Colleges System
- Endowment: $14,586,000 (2019)
- President: Ryan Cornner
- Superintendent: Ryan Cornner
- Students: 16,202
- Location: Glendale, California, U.S.
- Colors: Cardinal, gold
- Nickname: Vaqueros
- Sporting affiliations: CCCAA – WSC, SCFA (football)
- Website: www.glendale.edu

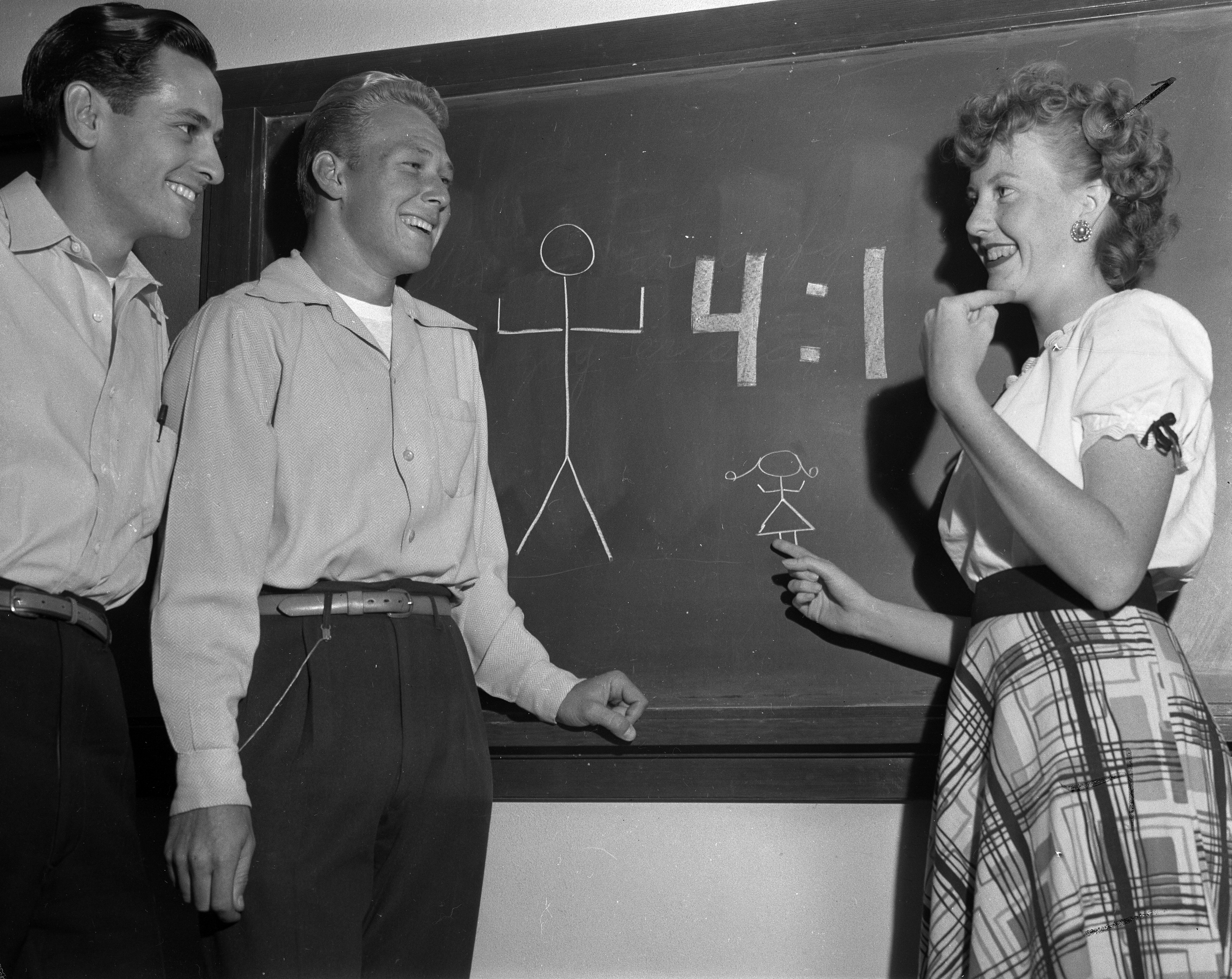
Four boys for every girl at Glendale College, 1948

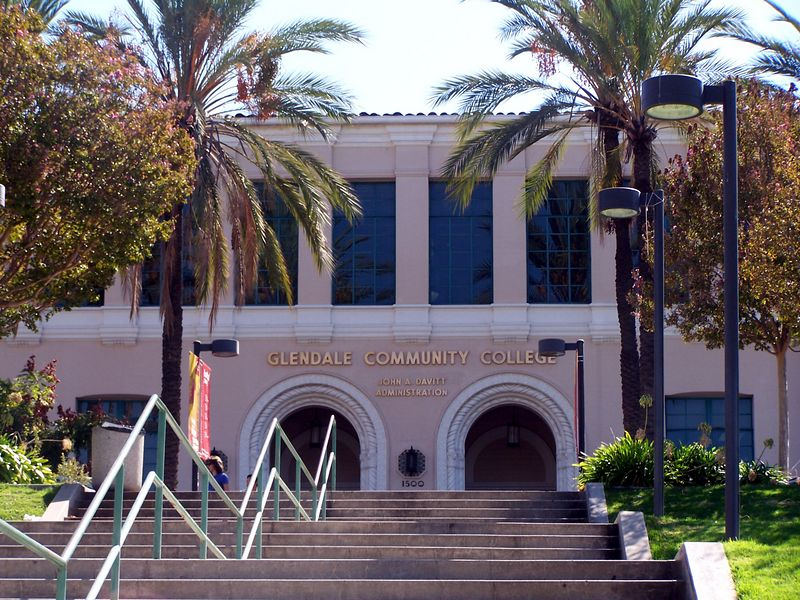
The John A. Davitt Administration building

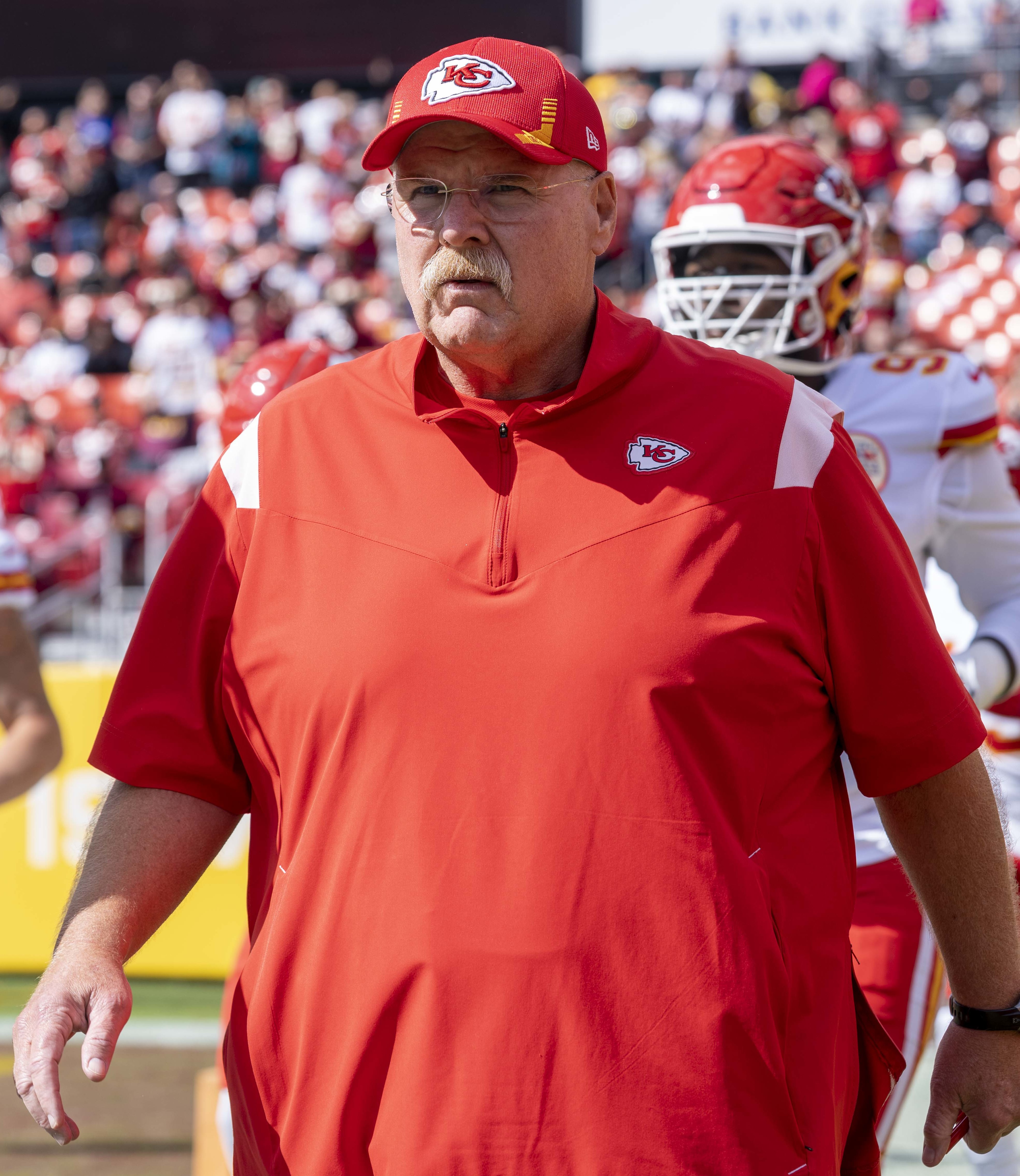
Andy Reid is an alumnus.

Glendale Community College (GCC) is a public community college in Glendale, California.

== History ==
The college was founded as Glendale Junior College in 1927, to serve the Glendale Union High School District which at the time included La Crescenta, Glendale, and Tujunga. From 1927 to 1929 classes were held in the buildings of Glendale Union High School at Broadway and Verdugo in the city of Glendale. In 1929 the junior college moved to the Harvard School plant of the Glendale Union High School District where it remained until 1937. In this year a new plant, part of the present one, was completed and occupied. The year before, in 1936, the Glendale Junior College District was dissolved as such and became a part of the new Glendale Unified School District. The name of the school was changed to Glendale College in 1944. On July 1, 1970, Glendale College became a part of the Glendale Junior College District. On April 20, 1971, the board of education adopted a resolution changing the district name to Glendale Community College District.

On November 4, 1980, Glendale voters approved a measure to establish separate boards, with the new board taking office in April 1981. The separation resulted in the creation of a board of trustees solely responsible for the governance of the Glendale Community College District. In 1936, 25 acres (10 ha) were acquired for the present site of the college.

== Campus ==
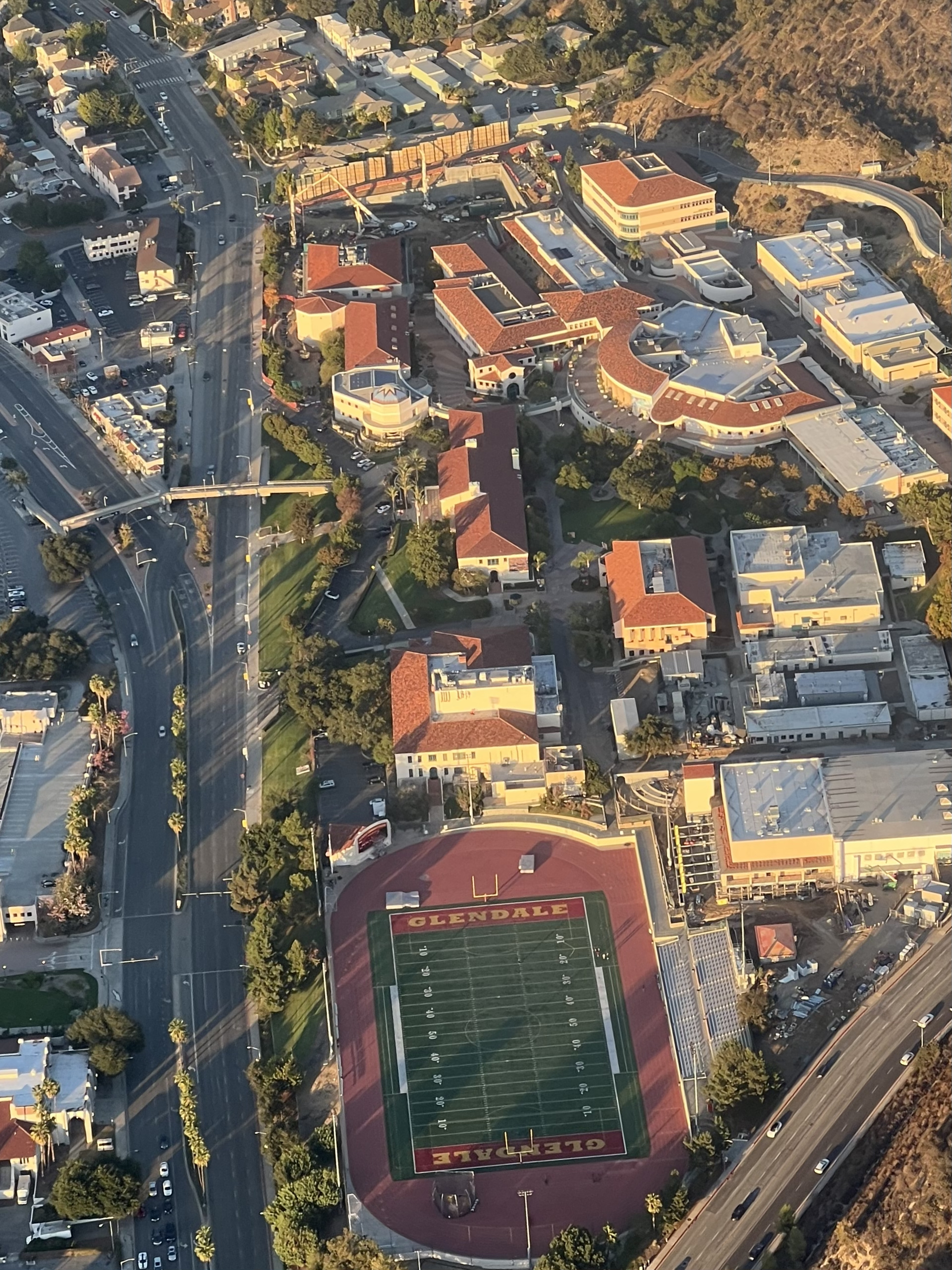
Aerial view of Glendale Community College (2021)

The Verdugo Campus now consists of 100 acres (40 ha) and 15 permanent buildings. It is located on the slopes of the San Rafael Hills overlooking the valleys in the Glendale area.

== Organization and administration ==
=== Glendale Community College District ===
The Glendale Community College District is a constituent community college district of the California Community College System (CCCS), whose only college is GCC.

It is governed by a 5-member elected Board of Trustees, elected by geographical district effective in 2017. Pursuant to their authority, they have promulgated policies and administrative regulations for the administration of the district and GCC and serves Glendale and La Crescenta-Montrose.

The elections for the Glendale Community College Board of Trustees is held at the same day the Glendale City Council and Glendale Unified School District Board of Education, which took place on a first Tuesday after the first Monday in April of odd-numbered years. Effective with the March 2020 election, the elections are held on a first Tuesday after the first Monday during the California Primary Election.

== Academics ==
The college has an open admissions policy and offers credit for life experiences. It is accredited by the Accrediting Commission for Community and Junior Colleges (ACCJC).

Student body composition as of 2022
Race and ethnicity	Total
White	52%
Hispanic	28%
Asian	8%
Foreign national	3%
Unknown	3%
Black	2%
Two or more races (Note: Other consists of Multiracial Americans & those who prefer to not say.)	2%
Gender Distribution
Male	43%
Female	57%
Age Distribution
Under 18	9%
18-24	50%
25-64	39%
Over 65	2%

== Athletics ==
The college athletic teams are nicknamed the Vaqueros (men) or Lady Vaqueros (women). Glendale currently fields eight men's and eight women's varsity teams. It competes as a member of the California Community College Athletic Association (CCCAA) in the Western State Conference (WSC) for all sports except football, which competes in Southern California Football Association (SCFA).

Blake Gailen played baseball for Glendale Community College, graduating in 2005, and was All-Western State Conference as a freshman and All-Southern California Team as a sophomore. Future major leaguer Ryan Sherriff pitched for the college baseball team as the team's ace in 2011, and was named 2011 First Team All-Western State Conference South Division.

== Campus life ==
=== Clubs and organizations ===
The school has numerous on-campus student clubs.

=== Student media ===
El Vaquero, established in 1927, is the student newspaper, and is a primary source of news and information for the campus. It publishes six to eight times per year during the autumn and spring semesters

== Notable people ==
=== Alumni ===
- Mark Caguioa, professional basketball player
- Glenn Corbett, actor
- Marian Cleeves Diamond, Professor Emeritus of Anatomy & Neuroanatomy at University of California, Berkeley, taught at UCB for over 50 years; one of the founders of modern neuroscience
- Angie Dickinson, actress, award winner, philanthropist, Police Woman (TV), Over 50 movies, author and fitness & health expert.
- Marco Estrada, pitcher Toronto Blue Jays
- Cathy Ferguson, two-time Olympic gold medalist swimmer
- Bob Gagliano, American football player
- Blake Gailen (born 1985), American-Israeli professional baseball player
- Beverly Garland, actress
- Dan Harmon, television writer/producer; creator of Community and co-creator of Rick and Morty.
- Ron Lopez, football player
- Hue Jackson, NFL coach
- Donald D. Lorenzen (1920–80), LA City Council member, 1969–77
- Masiela Lusha, actress
- Eva Mendes, actress
- Dick Moje, National Football League player
- Ricky Ortiz, professional wrestler
- Danielle Panabaker, actress
- Kay Panabaker, actress, zoologist
- Andy Reid, three-time Super Bowl-winning NFL coach
- Freddy Sanchez, baseball player
- Seann William Scott, actor
- Ryan Seacrest, broadcaster, producer
- Quincy "Schoolboy Q" Hanley, rapper
- Ryan Sherriff (born 1990), Major League baseball pitcher for the St. Louis Cardinals
- Lon Simmons, broadcaster
- Juno Stover, two-time Olympic diving medalist; two-time AAU champion; two-time Pan-American Games medalist
- Vic Tayback, actor
- Erick Thohir, Indonesian businessman
- Jordi Vilasuso, actor
- Kyle Vincent, musician
- Matt Whisenant, MLB baseball pitcher
- Frank Wykoff, three-time Olympic gold medalist runner

== In popular culture ==
Glendale Community College inspired the NBC show Community which premiered in the fall season of 2009. The show uses the fictional setting of Greendale Community College; the show's creator, Dan Harmon, has stated that the show was actually based on his experience attending Glendale Community College. Harmon describes the series as "flawed characters [coming into Greendale] and becoming unflawed by being in this place because it's been underestimated by the system around it."
