= Franklin E. Roach =

American astronomer

- Born: September 23, 1905; Jamestown, Ottawa County, Michigan
- Died: September 21, 1993 (aged 87); Tucson, Arizona
- Education: Wheaton Grade School; Wheaton High School; Wheaton College (Illinois); University of Michigan, B.Sc. 1927; Ohio State University; University of Chicago, M.Sc. 1930; Yerkes/Chicago Ph.D. 1934
- Known for: Photoelectric photometry advances; "nightglow" (airglow) studies; establishment with D.M. Hunten & J.W. Chamberlain of Rayleigh Unit; discovery with C.T. Elvey of "Diffuse Galactic Light".
- Spouse(s): 1. Eloise Blakslee; Roach [1930-1976]; (1976, death of Blakeslee); 2. Janet Gordon; Roach [1977-1993]; (1993, death of Franklin Roach).
- Children: 1. John Raymond Roach; (1930-1978); 2. Janet Loraine Roach (1936-); 3. Charlotte Louanne Roach (1937-); 4. Gerard Allyn Roach (1943-)
- Awards: Department of Commerce Gold Medal 1961
- Scientific career
- Fields: Astronomy, Astrophysics, Aeronomy, "Engineering Astronomy", Geophysics, Ufology
- Workplaces: Wheaton College (Illinois); Yerkes Observatory; A. O. Smith; Perkins Observatory; McDonald Observatory; Sul Ross State University; University of Arizona; Steward Observatory; U.S. Civil Service; California Institute of Technology; Manhattan District; Naval Ordnance Test Station (NOTS); Cactus Peak Observation Station; Fritz Peak Observation Station; CRPL (NBS Boulder); Battelle Northwest Laboratories; Rattlesnake Peak Observation Station; Kitt Peak National Observatory; Rutgers University; NASA; University of North Carolina at Chapel Hill; Morehead Planetarium and Science Center; NICAP; Condon Committee; Honolulu Planetarium, Hawaii
- Academic advisors: Otto Struve

Franklin Evans Roach (September 23, 1905 – September 21, 1993) was an American astronomer, astrophysicist, geophysicist, professor, and scientist analyzing UFO phenomenon who made significant contributions to the field of aeronomy in upper atmosphere research as one of its fathers. Roach was involved in high explosives physics research connected with the Manhattan Project and later with NICAP and the Condon Committee as part of ufology.

== Biography ==
Roach was born in Jamestown (now known as Jamestown Charter Township), Ottawa County, Michigan, fifteen miles southwest of Grand Rapids to his optometrist father Richard Franklin Roach (1878-1939) and his mother, a housewife, Ingeborg "Belle" Mathilde Torgerson (1878-1957). Franklin Roach died two days before reaching age 88.

Franklin was a Boy Scout as a youth reaching the rank of First Class while participating in a Scout Troop in Wheaton, Illinois under the direction of his father who was its Scoutmaster.

Roach attended in 1919-1921 his first two years of secondary education at Wheaton High School (Note: The site of the original Wheaton Grade School and Wheaton High School housed in the same physical building constructed in 1874 and in operation with classes in 1876 is now known as Longfellow Elementary School in Wheaton, Illinois.) in Wheaton, Illinois. This was followed by his final two years with graduation in 1923 from Benjamin Franklin High School in Los Angeles, California while residing in the Highland Park region of that city from 1921-1923.

Roach had three siblings: Laurance (c1909/1910-1993), Alice (-1995), and Richard (-1982).

Roach is buried in Boulder, Colorado.

== Rayleigh Unit ==
The Rayleigh Unit is a unit of photon flux used to measure the radiance of air glow, atmospheric phenomena like auroras, and integrated starlight of various forms in space. The Rayleigh Unit was first proposed in 1956 by Donald M. Hunten, Franklin E. Roach, and Joseph W. Chamberlain and named by them for Robert John Strutt, 4th Baron Rayleigh (1875–1947) who first discovered the glow of the night sky. The symbol for the unit is R, also like the unrelated Roentgen unit.

== Fulbright Scholar ==
Franklin Roach spent a year in Paris in 1951-2 on a Fulbright Fellowship investigating night-sky research. Roach also worked with a European pioneer, Daniel Barbier, in this same field.

== Encounter with Struve ==
Roach, who had a gentle personality, worked early in his career with Otto Struve. Struve had an abrasive personality, and spared no words upon his victims. Struve encouraged the removal of the existing Director of Yerkes Observatory and facilitated his own appointment to the same position, despite Frost originally inviting Struve to come to Yerkes when Struve at that time only spoke Russian and was destitute in Turkey and Greece after escaping the Russian Revolution. On July 1, 1932 Struve succeeded Edwin Brant Frost as Director of Yerkes Observatory. Roach, a graduate student at Yerkes in an office on that date, had the following encounter with Struve while measuring a spectogram authorized by the existing Director Frost earlier that morning:

- Version in Yerkes: (Note: From communication (letter?) of Roach to Osterbrock, dated May 30, 1991, as noted in Yerkes book.) (Note: β Lyrae = Beta Lyrae.)

Roach: Good morning, Mr. Struve.

Struve: Good morning. What are you doing?
Roach: I'm measuring a spectogram.
Struve: What star is it?
Roach: β Lyrae.
Struve: Who told you to measure that spectogram?
Roach: Mr. Frost did.

Struve: From now on I'll tell you what stars to measure!

- Version in Musings: (Note: Frost was well loved in the community and is still remembered to this day; Struve is not. Frost had allowed Roach to review the spectrum of Beta Lyrae as, probably unbeknownst to Roach, Frost had studied this particular star and wrote a paper on it which was published in 1895 earlier on in Frost's career.)

S. "What are you doing?"

R. "I'm measuring a spectogram"
S. "What is the star?"
R. "Beta Lyrae"
S. "Who told you to measure it?"
R. "Mr. Frost suggested it."

S. "From now on you do what I say."

== Book Contributions ==
Roach wrote most or contributed in part to several important books. Two elucidating on the subject of airglow (Note: Airglow as a term involves three types. During the day airglow is known as "day-glow"; at night as "night-glow"; or in connection with the gegenschein as either "counterglow" or "countershine" as part of the zodiacal light.) would serve as foundation volumes in the field of upper atmosphere science: Aurora and Airglow edited by B. M. McCormac, and The Light of the Night Sky. Another one with a scientific approach to ufology in the early 1970s would serve as a foundation volume for that field of exploratory science: UFO's: A Scientific Debate edited by Carl Sagan and Thornton Page. On the general front, he would write the chapter "Aurora and Airglow" in the Scientific American book The Planet Earth for the popular audience.

=== The Light of the Night Sky ===
While still associated with "Rutgers, The State University" in Newark, New Jersey and the University of Hawaii in Honolulu, Hawaii Roach served as the principal author, along with co-author Janet L. Gordon (then working for and associated with the Bernice P. Bishop Museum in Honolulu), in a successful book which served as an important early volume in the series Geophysics and Astrophysics Monographs. Gordon proofread and edited Roach's work, and wrote the historical sections to provide further context. Gordon was married with Roach later in 1977. The volume was published in December 1973 and became the fourth volume in this international series of fundamental monograph textbooks on the subjects of geophysics and astrophysics.

Roach's and Gordon's volume was entitled The Light of the Night Sky and dealt with the subject of the composition of the lighted sky itself in the topical subject area "the light of the night sky" (LONS). It gave scientific presentations with a fundamental overview of the atmospheric processes and interstellar physics involved, especially on Earth's nightside. The preface was prepared in August 1973 and Roach was still writing later chapters in September. Topics discussed included the dark adaptation of the eye, star counts and the distribution of starlight over the sky, the polarization of the "Zodiacal Light", and the study of "The Gegenschein".

Further discussions concerned whether the night-glow was a static or dynamic phenomena, the sources or causes of night-glow, the photochemical reactions in Earth's upper atmosphere, the appearance of the night-glow from space in Earth's exosphere and geocorona. The book also dealt with the polar aurora, auroral arcs, the varying brightness of the "Night-glow Layer" depending on zenithal distance, dust-scattered starlight, the diffuse galactic light, dust in the interplanetary and interstellar environment concerning the "Zodiacal Dust Cloud", and interstellar dust. The text ended with a summation concerning the cosmic light between galaxies and the contemplative topic of cosmology.

== Awards ==
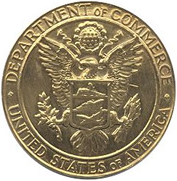
Obverse of the Commerce Gold Medal.

Becoming a world authority in auroral studies and airglow, Franklin travelled to Washington, D.C. in early 1961 to be honored as the recipient of the Gold Medal of the U.S. Department of Commerce for his "outstanding contribution to upper atmosphere physics by means of studies of optical emission from the night sky". Franklin had been nominated for the award by Gordon Little. The award was bestowed to him by Luther H. Hodges, the 15th United States Secretary of Commerce who had just completed his second term as Governor of North Carolina.

== Legacy ==
Memorial Scholarship

Franklin E. Roach Memorial Scholarship, University of Arizona.

Archives

Following Roach's passing his papers were archived in 1994 in Alaska upon the recommendation of Bob Eklund (Robert L. Eklund) (associated with Mount Wilson Observatory) to Donald Osterbrock who made arrangements:

- Franklin E. Roach Papers, Archives, Alaska and Polar Regions Department, Collections Section, Elmer E. Rasmuson Library, University of Alaska, Fairbanks, Alaska.

== See also ==
- Atmosphere of Earth
- Diffuse sky radiation
- Rayleigh scattering
- Mie scattering
