= Ron Lopez =

American football player (born 1970)

No. 15
- Position: Quarterback

Personal information
- Born: August 21, 1970 (age 56)
- Listed height: 6 ft 5 in (1.96 m)
- Listed weight: 220 lb (100 kg)

Career information
- High school: Franklin (Los Angeles)
- College: Utah State

Career history
- Iowa Barnstormers (1995–1997); Anaheim Piranhas (1997); Florida Bobcats (1997); San Jose SaberCats (1998); Portland Forest Dragons/Oklahoma Wranglers (1999–2001); Wichita Stealth (2002); Carolina Cobras (2003)

Career AFL statistics
- Comp. / Att.: 933 / 1,683
- Passing yards: 11,784
- TD–INT: 187–46
- QB rating: 93.84
- Rushing TDs: 7
- Stats at ArenaFan.com

Ron Lopez (born August 21, 1970) is an American former professional football quarterback who played eight seasons in the Arena Football League with the Iowa Barnstormers, Anaheim Piranhas, Florida Bobcats, San Jose SaberCats, Portland Forest Dragons/Oklahoma Wranglers and Carolina Cobras. He first enrolled at Glendale College before transferring to Utah State University.

== Early life and college ==
Ron Lopez was born on August 21, 1970. He attended Franklin High School in Los Angeles, California.

Lopez first played college football at Glendale College from 1988 to 1989. He then lettered for the Utah State Aggies from 1990 to 1991. In 1990, he completed 138 of 260 passes (53.1%) for 1,961 yards, 14 touchdowns, and 14 interceptions while also scoring three rushing touchdowns. In 1991, he recorded 153 completions on 314 passing attempts (48.7%) for 2,221 yards, 17 touchdowns, and 15 interceptions while scoring two rushing touchdowns.

== Professional career ==
Lopez played for the Iowa Barnstormers from 1995 to 1996, where he was the backup to Kurt Warner. Lopez was traded to the Anaheim Piranhas for Nathan Burchette in March 1997. Lopez was named the starting quarterback for the Piranhas' opening game against the New Jersey Red Dogs. He signed with the Florida Bobcats on June 12, 1997. Lopez played for the San Jose SaberCats in 1998, recording 47 touchdowns on 2,769 passing yards. He played the entirety of the 1998 season with two bulging disks in his neck. He was released by the SaberCats after the season and the team's doctors advised him to retire. However, after visiting a neck specialist and rehabilitating his injuries, Lopez signed with the Portland Forest Dragons in 1999. He recorded 38 touchdowns on 2,574 passing yards for the Forest Dragons in 1999. He had a tryout with the NFL's San Diego Chargers in 2000 but was not signed. The Forest Dragons moved to Oklahoma in 2000 and became the Oklahoma Wranglers. He recorded 90 touchdowns on 5,367 passing yards for the Oklahoma Wranglers from 2000 to 2001. Lopez played for the Wichita Stealth of the af2 in 2002. He signed with the Carolina Cobras on March 8, 2003.

== Personal life ==
Lopez was diagnosed with Non-Hodgkin lymphoma in February 2007 and declared cancer-free in August 2007.
