= Franklin High School (Los Angeles) =

Public high school in Highland Park, Los Angeles

Coordinates: 34.1157°N 118.1988°W

Benjamin Franklin High School

Location
- 820 North Avenue 54; Highland Park, Los Angeles, California 90042; United States

Information
- Type: Public
- Motto: Leave No Panther Behind, so proud to be a Panther.
- Established: 1916
- Principal: Marine Davtyan
- Staff: 71.05 (FTE)
- Enrollment: 1,284 (2024–2025)
- Student to teacher ratio: 18.07
- Campus: Urban
- Colors: Blue and buff
- Athletics conference: Northern League; CIF Los Angeles City Section
- Nickname: Panthers
- Rival: Eagle Rock High School
- Website: Official website

Benjamin Franklin High School (FHS) is a public high school in the Highland Park neighborhood, approximately seven miles northeast of downtown Los Angeles, California, United States. It is part of the Los Angeles Unified School District.

Established in 1916 with an enrollment of 225 students, the school currently educates approximately 1,400 students.

It was in the Los Angeles City High School District until 1961, when it merged into LAUSD.

Panthers are the school mascot and the school colors are blue and buff.

On September 30, 2026, student Xavier Nungaray-Martinez died after falling from a balcony on campus following a bullying incident, in what was ruled a suicide.

== Notable alumni ==
- Alan Arkin, 1951 graduate, Oscar-winning actor
- Lee Baca, 1960 graduate, sheriff of Los Angeles County, 1998-2016
- Dick Beckner, 1945 graduate, artistic gymnast
- Jack Beckner, 1948 graduate, artistic gymnast
- Richard Bishop, attended, artistic gymnast
- Alana Cordy-Collins, 1962 graduate, archaeologist
- Rocky Delgadillo, politician and former City Attorney of Los Angeles (2001–2009)
- Richard Duardo (1952–2014), printmaker
- Daryl F. Gates, 1944 graduate, Los Angeles police chief (1978–1992)
- Eunisses Hernandez, (1990) member of the Los Angeles City Council for the 1st district (elected 2022)
- Mike Hernandez, former member of the Los Angeles City Council for the 1st district (1991–2001)
- Allen Jacobs, 1960 graduate, National Football League player, fullback and halfback. Played for Green Bay Packers under Vince Lombardi.
- Leno LaBianca, murder victim
- Sammy Lee, Olympic gold medalist diver
- Ron Lopez, football player, Utah State graduate.
- Dick Moje, National Football League player, defensive end
- Louis R. Nowell (1915–2000), former member of the Los Angeles City Council for the 1st district (1963–77)
- George C. Pimentel, 1939 graduate, Nobel-nominated UC Berkeley chemistry professor
- Bobby Riggs, Wimbledon champion and member of the International Tennis Hall of Fame
- Franklin E. Roach (1905–1993), 1923 graduate, astronomer, professor, ufologist, and a father of aeronomy
- Gene Roddenberry (1921–1991), 1939 graduate, television screenwriter and creator of Star Trek: The Original Series
- Charles Simms, artistic gymnast
- Bui Simon, former Miss Universe and Miss Thailand 1988
- Richard "Humpty" Vission, 1987 graduate, Grammy-nominated producer and KPWR Power 106 FM DJ
- Jean Spangler (1923-1949?), 1941 graduate, actress, model and possible murder victim. Disappeared in 1949.
- Jim Tunney, 1947 graduate, NFL referee for 31 years, worked 3 Super Bowls; Franklin Principal, 1972–1973
