= Divine filiation =

Christian doctrine

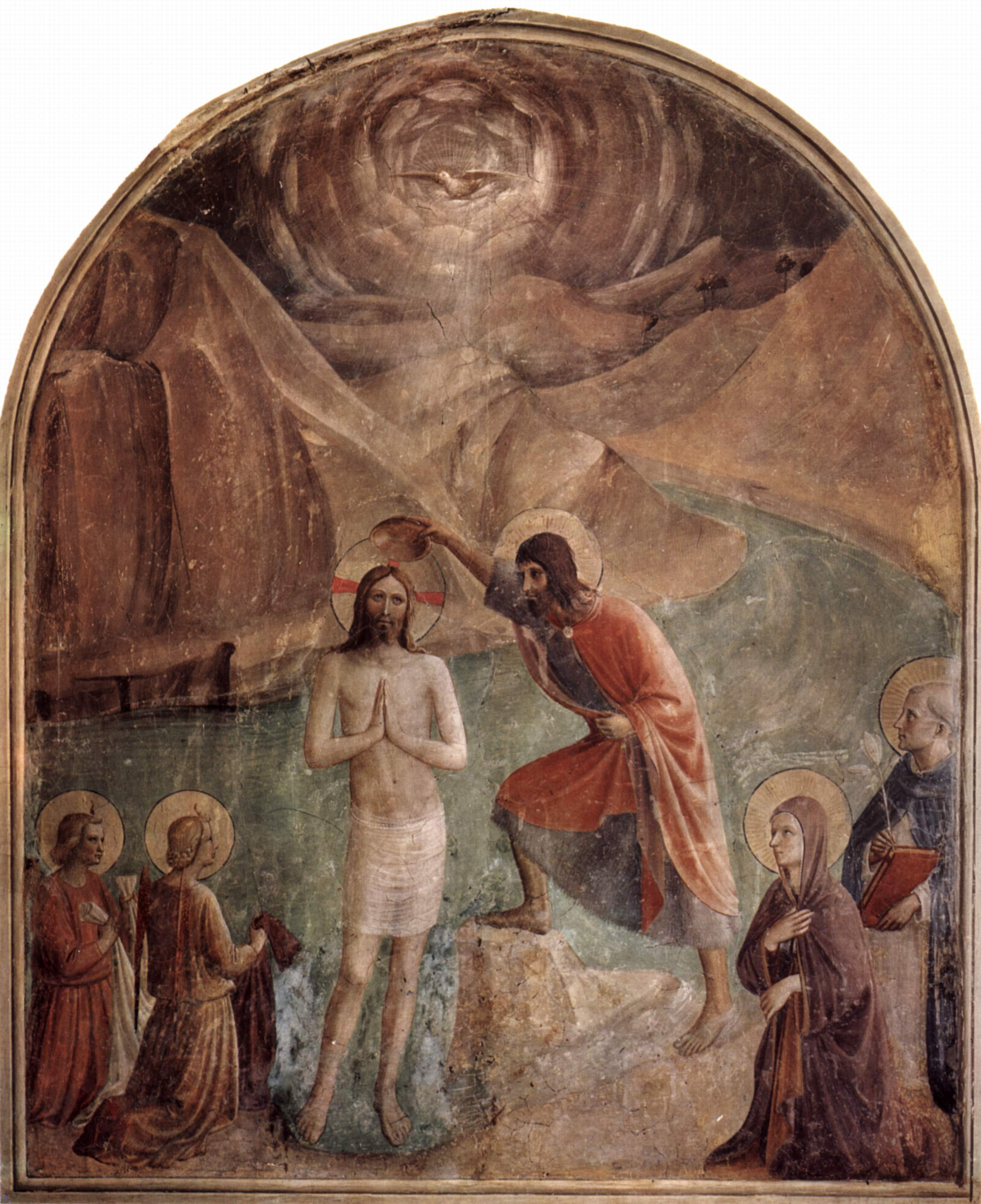
Fra Angelico's Baptism of Christ

Divine filiation is the Christian doctrine that Jesus Christ is the only-begotten Son of God by nature, and when Christians are redeemed by Jesus they become sons (and daughters) of God by adoption. This doctrine is held by most Christians.

Divine filiation builds on other Christians doctrines. In the doctrine of the Trinity, God the Son is the Eternal Word spoken by God the Father. The doctrine of the Incarnation teaches that around 2000 years ago, God the Son assumed a human nature, "became flesh and dwelt among us" (John 1:14) as Jesus of Nazareth.

Divine filiation is the centerpiece of the Gospel, the Good News: it is the reason why humanity was saved. And is also the purpose behind baptism. According to John Paul II, divine filiation is "the deepest mystery of the Christian vocation" and "the culminating point of the mystery of our Christian life...we share in salvation, which is not only the deliverance from evil, but is first of all the fullness of good: of the supreme good of the sonship of God."

== Basis ==
The Gospel of John begins by pointing to what Jesus brought: "to all who received him, who believed in his name, he gave power to become children of God." (John 1:11–13)

Saint Paul unraveled this mystery further in his letter to the Romans: "For all who are led by the Spirit of God are sons of God. For you did not receive the spirit of slavery to fall back into fear, but you have received the Spirit of adoption as sons, by whom we cry, “Abba! Father!” The Spirit himself bears witness with our spirit that we are children of God, and if children, then heirs—heirs of God and fellow heirs with Christ, provided we suffer with him in order that we may also be glorified with him." (Romans 8:14–17)

Christians are said to be children of God because through divine grace they share in the nature of God. [St. Peter] referred to Christians as "partakers of the divine nature." (2 Peter 1:4) Saint Augustine of Hippo, one of the early Church Fathers, expresses the participation of the baptized in the Divine nature by saying: "By the love of God we are made gods."

== Catholic Church ==
The very first point of the Catechism of the Catholic Church (CCC) states that God's "plan of sheer goodness" is oriented towards man's divine filiation: "In his Son and through him, he invites men to become, in the Holy Spirit, his adopted children and thus heirs of his blessed life." (CCC 1; italics added)

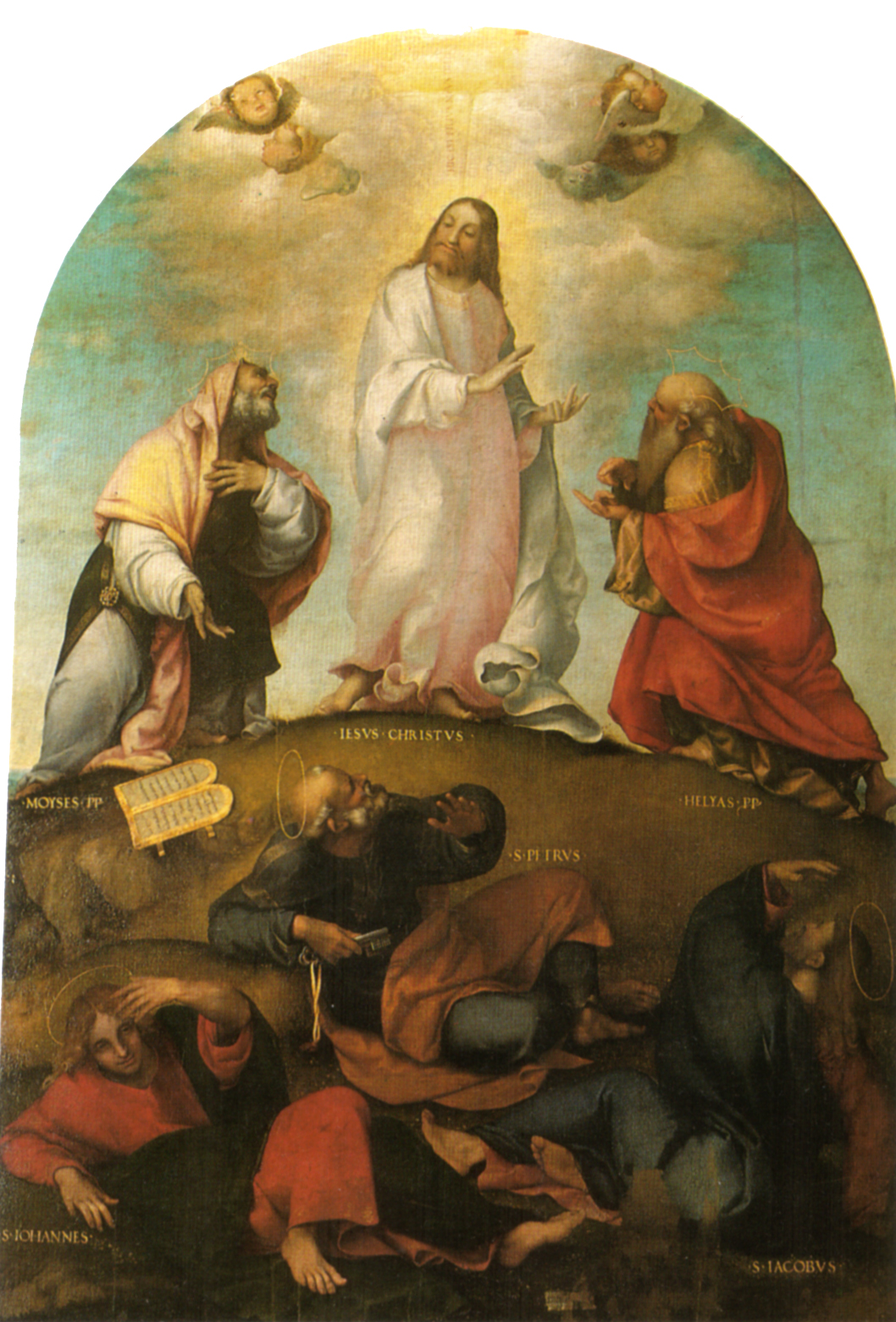
Words uttered by God the Father at the Transfiguration of Christ: Hic est filius meus dilectus (Behold my beloved son)

Benedict XVI explained that "The Fathers of the Church say that when God created man 'in his image' he looked toward the Christ who was to come, and created man, according to the image of the 'new Adam,' the man who is the criterion of the human... Jesus is 'the Son' in the strict sense - he is of one substance with the Father. He wants to draw all of us into his humanity and so into this Sonship, into his total belonging to God."

According to John Paul II in Redemptor hominis, his first encyclical, at the deepest root of the redemption of the world is the fullness of justice in the heart of Jesus Christ "in order that it may become justice in the hearts of many human beings, predestined from eternity in the Firstborn Son to be children of God and called to grace, called to love." According to John Paul II, Christians are supposed to "be always aware of the dignity of the divine adoption," so as to give meaning to what they do.

Divine filiation, said John Paul II, constitutes the essence of the Good News. "What is the Good News for humanity?" is a question of the Compendium of the Catechism of the Catholic Church. The reply to this question begins with Jesus Christ and ends with Galatians 4:45: God sent his Son, born of a woman, born under the law, to redeem those who were under the law, so that we might receive adoption as sons. Divine filiation, still according to John Paul II, is "the deepest mystery of the Christian vocation: in the divine plan, we are indeed called to become sons and daughters of God in Christ, through the Holy Spirit."

Thus, the Catechism states: "By his death, Christ liberates us from sin; by His Resurrection, He opens for us the way to a new life. [Justification] brings about filial adoption so that men become Christ's brethren." (CCC 654)

=== Piety of children ===
An important consequence of divine filiation, Benedict XVI says, is the prayer of Christians as children of God. Prayer is at the center of the life of Christ, the Son of God. Benedict XVI says that the person of Jesus is prayer. The "fundamental insight" of the Sermon on the Mount is, he says, "that man can be understood only in the light of God, and that his life is made righteous only when he lives it in relation to God." Thus, Jesus, after praying and after being asked by the disciples how to pray, teaches the Our Father, a prayer which aims to "configure [man] to the image of the Son," and trains him in the "inner attitude of Jesus."

"Contemplative prayer is the prayer of the child of God, of the forgiven sinner who agrees to welcome the love by which he is loved and who wants to respond to it by loving even more." (CCC 2712 )

=== Responsibility for the Christian mission ===
According to John Paul II, since Christians are other "Christs", they are in a sense co-redeemers with him, and have, so to speak, the same role as Jesus Christ—to save other men, and make them children of God. "As members, they share a common dignity from their rebirth in Christ, they have the same filial grace and the same vocation to perfection... Because of the one dignity flowing from Baptism, each member of the lay faithful, together with ordained ministers and men and women religious, shares responsibility for the Church's mission."

Because, according the Catholic teachings, the Catholic laity—that is, ordinary Christians (not priests or consecrated religious)—are children of God, they have a specific role to play in the world: "By reason of their special vocation it belongs to the laity to seek the kingdom of God by engaging in temporal affairs and directing them according to God's will. . . . It pertains to them in a special way so to illuminate and order all temporal things with which they are closely associated that these may always be effected and grow according to Christ and maybe to the glory of the Creator and Redeemer. The initiative of lay Christians is necessary especially when the matter involves discovering or inventing the means for permeating social, political, and economic realities with the demands of Christian doctrine and life. This initiative is a normal element of the life of the Church: Lay believers are in the front line of Church life; for them the Church is the animating principle of human society. Therefore, they in particular ought to have an ever-clearer consciousness not only of belonging to the Church, but of being the Church." (CCC 898-99)

=== Meaning and significance ===
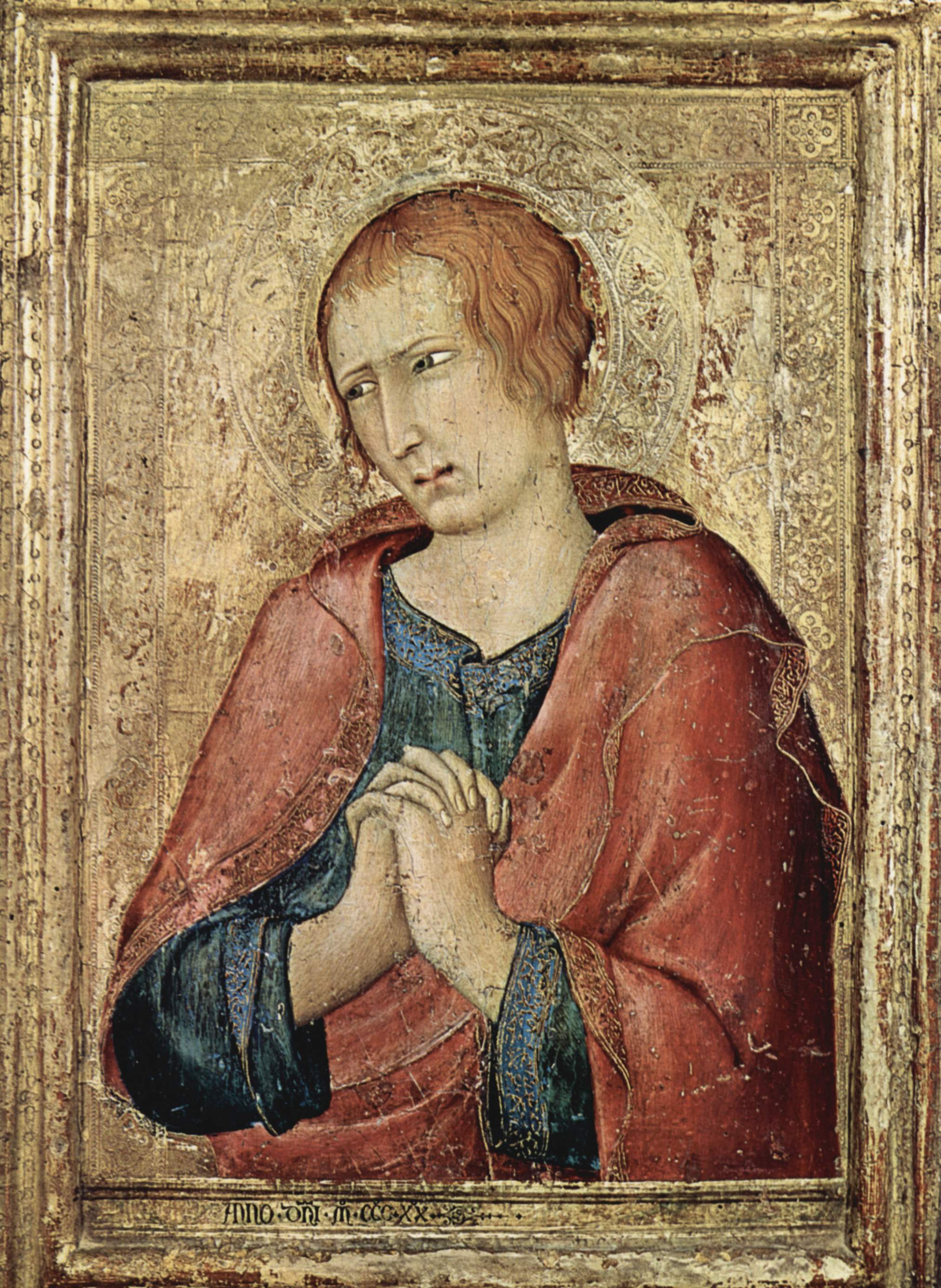
St. John the Evangelist: "See what love the Father has given us, that we should be called children of God; and so we are!" (1 John 3:1)

Thus, John Paul II said that divine filiation is "the culminating point of the mystery of our Christian life. In fact, the name 'Christian' indicates a new way of being, to be in the likeness of the Son of God. As sons in the Son, we share in salvation, which is not only the deliverance from evil, but is first of all the fullness of good: of the supreme good of the sonship of God."

Divine filiation is at the core of Christianity. "Our divine filiation is the centerpiece of the Gospel as Jesus preached it. It is the very meaning of the salvation He won for us. For he did not merely save us from our sins; He saved us for sonship."

Thus the incarnation and the redemption is for this:

The Word became flesh to make us "partakers of the divine nature": "For this is why the Word became man, and the Son of God became the Son of man: so that man, by entering into communion with the Word and thus receiving divine sonship, might become a son of God."[St. Irenaeus] "For the Son of God became man so that we might become God."[St. Athanasius] "The only-begotten Son of God, wanting to make us sharers in his divinity, assumed our nature, so that he, made man, might make men gods."[St. Thomas Aquinas] (CCC 460)

The Christian then is another "Christ": "We can adore the Father because he has caused us to be reborn to his life by adopting us as his children in his only Son: .. through the anointing of his Spirit who flows from the head to the members, he makes us other "Christs." "...you who have become sharers in Christ are appropriately called "Christs." (CCC 2782)

The divinization of man through sonship is real and metaphysical. It is not metaphorical, i.e. a mere comparison with a real thing that is similar. In the Christian religion, God is really Father, and does not just act like human fathers. And God really made us share in his nature, and thus we are really children. Not in the same level as the Only Begotten Son, but truly sharing in his filiation and his divinity.

And so St. John the Evangelist said with a tone of amazement, "See what love the Father has given us, that we should be called children of God; and so we are!" (1 John 3:1)

=== Theological views ===
Writing in the early 20th century (circa 1917–1923), Blessed Columba Marmion gave great emphasis to this doctrine. One commentator has observed that although the doctrine had been addressed by many spiritual writers before him, "it would be difficult to find another who had given the mystery such preeminence, making it, as he does, the beginning and the end of the spiritual life. And with Dom Marmion it is not so much a theory or a system, as a living truth that acts directly on the soul." Some believe the Catholic Church will one day formally declare Marmion the Doctor of Divine Adoption.

== Judaism's view ==
According to Judaism's view of Jesus, Jewish scholars note that though Jesus is said to have used the phrase "my Father in Heaven" (cf. Lord's Prayer), this common poetic Jewish expression may have been misinterpreted as literal.

== See also ==
- God the Father
- Love of God
- Supernatural adoption
- Social trinitarianism
- Filioque
