= Donald Raleigh =

Donald Raleigh may refer to:

- Donald Raleigh (historian), American historian
- Donald Raleigh (politician) (born 1965), American politician

== See also ==
- Don Raleigh
