= Rally (investment company) =

- Industry: Alternative asset investment
- Founded: 2016
- Headquarters: New York
- Website: rallyrd.com

Rally is an alternative asset investment company which allows users to buy and sell equity shares in collectible assets. The company was founded in 2016 and is headquartered in New York.

== Overview ==
The company was originally founded under the name "Rally Rd." Rally initially securitized classic cars and had a collection of nearly 30 vehicles. Each car was listed in a process similar to an initial public offering, with the first offering for a vehicle being completed in 2017. Since 2019, Rally expanded to providing more than 300 assets across categories including items such as art, wine, watches, sports collectibles, natural history artifacts, musical instruments and first-edition books.

Rally registers each collectible item on its platform with the SEC as a security. Investment cars are not registered for road use, but are stored in private warehouses in locations such as Upstate New York or Pennsylvania.

As of March 2021, Rally had approximately 200,000 users with nearly $30 million of merchandise. The company has developed mobile applications for Android and iPhone devices.

== Funding ==
In January 2018, Rally raised a $2.9 million seed round led by Social Leverage and other angel investors. In 2020, the company closed a $17 million oversubscribed financing round, while in May 2021, it raised $30 million in Series B funding led by Accel with other investors including Upfront Ventures and Social Leverage.

In October 2021, Rally raised $15 million follow-on to their Series B round led by Wheelhouse, with participation from Josh Richards, Griffin Johnson, Noah Beck, John Stamos, Connor Schell, and Bill Simmons. The total funding of the company since inception is approximately $65 million.

== Business model ==
Rally has a fractional ownership model for those in the investing and the enthusiast communities. The company sources a collectible for sale and creates a new entity as a subsidiary of an LLC. The startup then holds an SEC-registered offering where potential investors can view details about the collectible and, if desired, purchase one or more of the divided equity shares. When the offering is completed, there’s a 3-month hold period, after which the company’s mobile application provides a monthly trading window where new users can place bids and existing investors can place asks, allowing the equity shares to be traded on a marketplace.
