= Rayleigh (unit) =

Unit of photon flux

The rayleigh is a unit of photon flux, used to measure faint light emitted in the sky, such as airglow and auroras. It was first proposed in 1956 by Donald M. Hunten, Franklin E. Roach, and Joseph W. Chamberlain. It is named for Robert Strutt, 4th Baron Rayleigh (1875–1947). Its symbol is R (also used for the röntgen, an unrelated unit). SI prefixes are used with the rayleigh.

One rayleigh (1 R) is defined as an emission rate of $10^{10}$ photons in all directions (4π steradians) per second by a column of glowing gas with a cross-section surface area of exactly 1 square meter (10.764 square feet). The definition does not specify length of the column, only its cross section surface area. Rayleigh is a unit of an apparent emission rate, without allowances being made for scattering or absorption. The night sky has an intensity of about 250 R, while auroras can reach values of 1,000,000 R.

The relationship between photon radiance, L, (with unit photon per square metre per second per steradian) and I (with unit rayleigh) is:
$$I = 4\pi~\mathrm{sr} \times L \times \frac{\mathrm{R}}{\mathrm{10^{10}~photon{\cdot}m^{-2}{\cdot}s^{-1}}}$$

1 rayleigh can thus be expressed in SI units as either:

- 10^{10} photons s^{−1} (m^{2} column)^{−1}
- 1/4π 10^{10} photons s^{−1} m^{−2} sr^{−1}
