= Columba Marmion =

Irish abbot (1858–1923)

Blessed Columba Marmion OSB
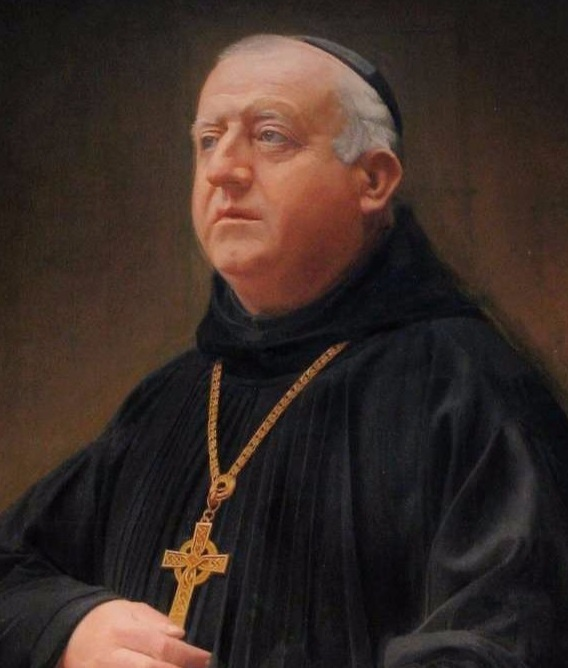

Abbot and Religious
- Born: Joseph Aloysius Marmion; 1 April 1858; Dublin, Ireland
- Died: 30 January 1923 (aged 64); Maredsous Abbey, Belgium
- Venerated in: Catholic Church
- Beatified: 3 September 2000, Saint Peter's Square, Vatican City by Pope John Paul II
- Feast: 30 January

Columba Marmion, O.S.B (born Joseph Aloysius Marmion; 1 April 1858 – 30 January 1923) was an Irish Benedictine monk and the third abbot of Maredsous Abbey in Belgium. Beatified by Pope John Paul II on September 3, 2000, Columba was one of the most popular and influential Catholic authors of the 20th century. His books are considered spiritual classics.

== Early Years (1858–1886) ==
Columba was born in Queen Street, Dublin, Ireland on 1 April 1858, into a large and very religious family; three of his sisters became nuns. His father, William Marmion was from Clane, County Kildare. His mother, Herminie Cordier, was French. He was baptised on 6 April with the name "Joseph Aloysius". From a very early age he was seemingly "consumed with some kind of inner fire or enthusiasm for the things of God". He received his secondary education at the Jesuit Belvedere College in Dublin.

At the age of 16, Marmion entered the diocesan seminary at Holy Cross College in Clonliffe. At the time he entered the seminary, his "faith was very strong"; he perceived "something more than simple theoretical theses" in Catholic doctrine, in particular "that a man's love for God is measured by his love for his neighbor".

One day during a vacation [at about the age of 17] he learnt that a poor old woman, well known to his family, was threatened with being summoned before the magistrates by an exacting creditor who claimed the payment of a somewhat large debt. The young seminarian possessed an equivalent amount saved up little by little for a trip he had promised himself. A struggle went on in his heart between his generosity and the legitimate desire to enjoy the fruit of his economies. This struggle lasted all night. In the morning charity had gained the day; with his father's consent, he generously made over his savings in favour of the poor woman.

A "very important moment in Dom Marmion's inner life" occurred while he was still in seminary.

It seems that one day when returning to the study hall he had all at once, to use his own words, "a light on God's Infinity." While this "light" only lasted for an instant, it was so clear and strong that it left an indelible impression on him, so that... "he referred to this not without emotion and thanksgiving during the last days of his life."

He travelled to Rome in December 1879 to complete his studies at the Pontifical Irish College. In September 1880, he visited the Benedictine abbey at Monte Cassino. It was during this trip that he first considered becoming a Benedictine. However, his bishop thought it would be better for him to work as a secular priest for a time before making a decision. He was ordained in Rome on 16 June 1881, and celebrated his first Mass the next day. On his journey back to Ireland, he passed through Maredsous, Belgium – a monastery founded in 1872 by Benedictine monks from the Abbey of Beuron, Germany. He was impressed with the community and considered whether his vocation might lie there.

In September 1881, he was appointed curate at the parish in Dundrum in the south of Dublin. Marmion's work as a parish priest "daily brought him into contact with a cross-section of humanity", and he was "called upon to advise, teach, console and give every kind of spiritual and material aid". He "possessed an extraordinary facility for adapting himself to other people", and above all "in comforting others and putting them at their ease". During this period he began to learn "the delicate art of spiritual direction in which he was later to excel".

In September 1882, he was appointed Professor of Metaphysics at Holy Cross College at Clonliffe, the Dublin diocesan seminary where Marmion himself had studied. For the next four years, he embarked on the education and spiritual direction of others, including an appointment as chaplain to a nearby convent.

== Maredsous (1886–1899) ==
Marmion joined the monastic community at Maredsous in November 1886, having received his archbishop's approval. He had a difficult time adjusting to the novitiate. He suffered from loneliness, being older than his fellow novices and already a priest, and he was not fluent in French.

Marmion made his simple profession on 10 February 1888. Because he had already completed his philosophy and theology studies, he was instead asked to teach in the abbey school. When this proved too difficult for him, Marmion instead was appointed to teach philosophy to the monks in formation.

Marmion made his solemn profession on 10 February 1891. He became well-known in the area for his preaching after a sermon given at a local parish a few days after his profession. He was appointed the rector of a new college founded at Maredsous, but was not successful and was removed from the position after a year and made a professor of English instead. He also acted as assistant to the novice master and continued to teach philosophy to the junior monks.

== Prior of Mont César, Louvain (1899–1909) ==
In 1899, Marmion helped to found the Abbey of Mont César, Louvain, Belgium, and became its first prior and prefect of clerics, positions which he held until he left Mont César in 1909.

Marmion taught dogmatic theology at Louvain, following the thought of Thomas Aquinas. His lectures were distinguished by, "on the one hand, his extreme clearness, and on the other his happy and fluent application of doctrine to the inner life". Rather than presenting "revealed truths like mere theorems of geometry having no bearing on the interior life", Marmion sought to inspire his students to "live in and by the mysteries he set forth to them".

In addition to teaching, Marmion was the spiritual director of the Carmelite nuns in Louvain, visiting them weekly to hear confessions and give conferences. He became spiritual director to many other communities and gave frequent retreats in Belgium, Ireland, and England. During this time, he became confessor to the future Cardinal Mercier, with whom he became close friends.

== Abbot of Maredsous (1909–1923) ==
In 1893, Dom Hildebrand de Hemptinne, abbot of Maredsous, was appointed by Pope Leo XIII as the first Abbot Primate of the Benedictine Order. The pope allowed him to remain as the abbot of Maredsous, though the position required de Hemptinne to spend most of his time in Rome. De Hemptinne had difficulty fulfilling both roles, and in 1905 Marmion's name began to be mentioned as a possible successor as abbot of Maredsous. In August 1909, de Hemptinne resigned as abbot, and Marmion was elected abbot 28 September 1909.

Marmion adopted as his abbatial motto Magis prodesse quam praesse (lit. 'to be useful rather than to command'), a maxim taken from the Rule of St. Benedict. The monastery had grown in membership while he was away and had taken on new works and apostolates. He had the abbey equipped with electricity and central heating, facilities rarely to be found in monasteries at that time.

In December 1909, the government of Belgium asked Maredsous to consider founding a Benedictine monastery in Katanga, in the Belgian Congo. The government offered land and money to help the new foundation. Marmion consulted the monks of Maredsous who, though sympathetic, opposed the offer due to the lack of available monks.

In February 1913, Marmion was invited to give a retreat to the Anglican monks of Caldey Abbey and nuns of Milford Haven to prepare for their reception into the Catholic Church; the following June, he celebrated Mass for them on the occasion of their being established as a Benedictine monastery.

With the outbreak of war in 1914, there were concerns that Maredsous would not be able to obtain enough food in its remote location to feed all of the monks. Marmion decided to travel to England in September 1914 to find accommodations for the younger monks there or in Ireland, so that their studies would not be interrupted. This involved Marmion travelling in disguise and without a passport. When he arrived in England, he was at first turned away for lack of a passport but managed to convince a fellow Irishman customs officer to allow him entry.

Marmion at first was able to find accommodations for his monks in four separate English Benedictine houses. However, desiring to have the monks all together, he purchased a house in Edermine in Ireland as a temporary house for them, not intending it to be a permanent foundation. Between the difficulties of setting up the house, reassuring others that it was not meant to be permanent, and his own health problems, Marmion was not able to return to Maredsous until May 1916. The monks left the Edermine house in 1919 at the insistence of the local bishop, and the house was sold a few months later.

In late 1918, the German monks of the Benedictine Monastery of the Dormition, on Mount Zion in Jerusalem, were expelled from the abbey. The chaplain of the occupying Allied forces wrote to Marmion, asking what was to be done with the monastery. Marmion obtained permission from Pope Benedict XV, who had originally planned to send monks from another abbey, but Cardinal Gasparri, the pope's Secretary of State, required that the occupation be temporary. Four monks of Maredsous were dispatched in March 1919, and remained at Dormition until November 1920, after the German monks had been allowed to return.

In September 1922, at the request of the Bishop of Namur, he led the annual diocesan pilgrimage to Lourdes. The following month, he presided at the celebration of the 50th anniversary of the foundation of Maredsous Abbey (which he had governed as abbot for 14 years).

Marmion was struck during a flu epidemic and died on 30 January 1923.

=== His writings ===
In 1895, Marmion gave a retreat for a small group of nuns. The notes for those talks contained in kernel an idea that would come to be published in 1917 as Christ, the Life of the Soul. Dom Raymond Thibaut, a monk of Maredsous, was chosen by the prior to assemble the book from conferences that Marmion gave, with some input from Marmion himself. It was first published privately but was immediately successful in the Catholic world. It is viewed as the first book of a trilogy, along with Christ in His Mysteries (1919) and Christ the Ideal of the Monk (1922), both of which were also assembled by Thibaut.

In contrast to the literature of the time, which was a mere "rehash... of pious thoughts", Marmion's work was described as "revolutionary", initiating "a profound spiritual revival". However, his work was not really new but rather "a return to what was fundamental".

A second major theme of his work is the doctrine of divine adoption in Christ. Marmion did not originate this idea, but "it would be difficult to find another who had given the mystery such preeminence, making it, as he does, the beginning and the end of the spiritual life". Some believe the Catholic Church will one day formally declare Marmion the Doctor of Divine Adoption.

Sources for Marmion's thought include, preeminently, the Bible (especially St. Paul and St. John), the Church Fathers, St. Thomas Aquinas, and the Liturgy (i.e., the Mass, the Divine Office, the sacraments), as well as St. Francis de Sales and Msgr. Charles Gay.

Marmion's writings have received formal and informal endorsements from multiple popes, including Benedict XV, Pius XI, Pius XII, Paul VI, and John Paul II.

== Beatification ==
Rapidly, favours and miracles were attributed to him, justifying the transfer, in 1963, of his body from the monks' cemetery to the abbatial church. His body was found to be incorrupt after more than 40 years. A cure from cancer obtained after a woman from St. Cloud, Minnesota, visited his tomb in 1966 was investigated by the Church and recognized as miraculous in 2000, leading to his beatification in that year.

Dom Columba Marmion was beatified on 3 September 2000 by Pope John Paul II, on the same occasion as Pope John XXIII, Pope Pius IX, Tommaso Reggio, and William Chaminade.

At the beatification ceremony, Pope John Paul II declared:

He bequeathed to us an authentic treasury of spiritual teaching for the Church of our time. In his writings he teaches a way of holiness, simple and yet demanding, for all the faithful, whom God, through love, has destined to be his adopted children in Christ Jesus... May a wide rediscovery of the spiritual writings of Blessed Columba Marmion help priests, religious and laity to grow in union with Christ and bear faithful witness to Him through ardent love of God and generous service to their brothers and sisters.

May Blessed Columba Marmion help us to live ever more intensely, to understand ever more deeply, our membership in the Church, the Mystical Body of Christ!

Following the beatification, Dom Marmion's cause for canonization has been opened. In 2009, the Archdiocese of Vancouver, Canada, began a canonical investigation into the cure of a man ravaged by a necrotizing fasciitis. He had been expected to die within hours.

Both Marmion Abbey and Marmion Academy (established in 1933) in Aurora, Illinois are named in his honour.

== Works ==
=== Principal works ===
Thanks to Dom Raymond Thibaut, his secretary, the central teachings of Dom Marmion, delivered orally in French, were memorialized in writing as follows:

- Le Christ, vie de l'âme (1917)
- Le Christ dans ses Mystères (1919)
- Le Christ, idéal du moine (1922)
- Le Christ, idéal du prêtre (1951)

These were translated into English, respectively, as follows:

- Christ, the Life of the Soul, English translation by "A Nun of Tyburn," i.e., Mother Mary St. Thomas, 1922
- Christ in His Mysteries, English translation by Mother Mary St. Thomas, 1924
- Christ the Ideal of the Monk, English translation by Mother Mary St. Thomas, 1926
- Christ the Ideal of the Priest, English translation by Dom Matthew Dillon, 1958

=== Posthumous Works Published in English ===
- Sponsa Verbi: The Virgin Consecrated to Christ, translated by Dom Francis Izard (London: Sands, 1925)
- Words of Life on the Margin of the Missal, edited by Dom Raymond Thibaut (St. Louis, Missouri: B. Herder Book Co., 1939)
- Union with God According to the Letters of Direction of Dom Marmion, by Dom Raymond Thibaut (London: Sands and Co., 1949)
- Suffering with Christ: An Anthology of the Writings of Dom Columba Marmion, compiled by Dom Raymond Thibaut (Westminster, Maryland: The Newman Press, 1952)
- The Trinity in Our Spiritual Life: An Anthology of the Writings of Dom Columba Marmion, compiled by Dom Raymond Thibaut (Westminster, Maryland: The Newman Press, 1953)
- The English Letters of Abbot Marmion, 1858-1923 (Baltimore, Maryland: Helicon Press, 1962)
- Fire of Love: An Anthology of Abbot Marmion's Published Writings on the Holy Spirit, edited by Charles Dollen (St. Louis, Missouri: B. Herder Book Co., 1964)

=== English Translations in Print ===
- Christ, the Life of the Soul. A new translation by Alan Bancroft. Introduction by Dom Mark Tierney, OSB (European Vice-Postulator of Marmion's Beatification Cause). Foreword by Fr. Benedict Groeschel, CFR (Bethesda, Maryland: Zaccheus Press, 2005) (ISBN 978-0-9725981-5-6) (in North America) and (Leominster, UK: Gracewing, 2005) (ISBN 978-0-85244-656-0) (outside North America).
- Christ in His Mysteries. A new translation by Alan Bancroft. Introduction by Aidan Nichols, OP; Foreword by Fr. Benedict Groeschel, CFR. (Bethesda, Maryland: Zaccheus Press, 2008) (ISBN 978-0-9725981-9-4) (in North America) and (Leominster, UK: Gracewing, 2010) (ISBN 978-0-85244-735-2) (outside North America); both publishers' editions are available in Australasia.
- Christ the Ideal of the Monk. Reprint of the Mother Mary St. Thomas translation. (Ridgefield, Connecticut: Roman Catholic Books, circa 2005) (ISBN 0-9742098-1-3)
- Christ the Ideal of the Priest. Reprint of the Dom Matthew Dillon translation, with adaptations made by Rev. David L. Toups, STD. (San Francisco, California: Ignatius Press, 2005) (ISBN 978-1-58617-014-1) (in North America) and (Leominster, UK: Gracewing, 2006) (ISBN 978-0-85244-657-7) (in the United Kingdom)
- Union with God: Letters of Spiritual Direction by Blessed Columba Marmion. Reprint of the Mother Mary St. Thomas translation, with an introduction by Rev. David L. Toups, STD. (Bethesda, Maryland: Zaccheus Press, 2006) (ISBN 978-0-9725981-6-3)
- Columba Marmion: Correspondance 1881–1923. Edited by Mark Tierney, R.-Ferdinand Poswick, and Nicolas Dayez. (Paris: François-Xavier de Guibert, 2008)

== Footnotes ==
=== References ===
- Capelle, Bernard (1948). "Marmion's Place in the History of Spirituality". In Monks of Glenstal (ed.). Abbot Marmion: An Irish Tribute. Westminster: The Newman Press. pp. 10–20.
- Earl of Wicklow (1949). "Abbot Marmion–A Biographical Sketch". More About Dom Marmion. St. Louis, Mo.: B. Herder Book Co. pp. 9–27.
- More About Dom Marmion: A Study of His Writings Together with a Chapter from an Unpublished Work and a Biographical Sketch, translated by The Earl of Wicklow from articles in the February 1948 issue of La Vie Spirituelle. St. Louis, Mo.: B. Herder Book Co. 1949.
- O'Herlihy, T. (1948). "Abbot Marmion as Spiritual Director". In Monks of Glenstal (ed.). Abbot Marmion: An Irish Tribute. Westminster: The Newman Press. pp. 106–114.
- Philipon, Marie Michel (1956). The Spiritual Doctrine of Dom Marmion. Translated by Dillon, Matthew. Westminster, Maryland: Newman Press.
- Rigali, Justin F. (2006). "Blessed Columba Marmion: Doctor of Divine Adoption". Josephinum. 13 (2): 132–142.
- Thibaut, Raymond (1949). Abbot Columba Marmion: A Master of the Spiritual Life. trans. Mother Mary St. Thomas. St. Louis, Mo.: B. Herder Book Co.
- Tierney, Mark (2006). "The Life and Times of Blessed Columba Marmion: The Pastoral Dimension". Josephinum. 13 (2): 143–148.
- Tierney, Mark (2000). Blessed Columba Marmion: A Short Biography. Collegeville, Mn.: Liturgical Press.
- Toups, David L. (2006). "The Sacerdotal Character as the Foundation of the Priestly Life: The Contribution of Blessed Columba Marmion". Josephinum. 13 (2): 159–196.

=== Other books ===
- Ph. Nyssens-Braun, Dom Columba Marmion intime. Editions Ramgal, Thuillies, and Maison Casterman. 1939.
