= Rallis Kopsidis =

Greek painter and writer

Rallis Kopsidis (Greek: Ράλλης Κοψίδης; 1929 – 14 August 2010) was a Greek painter and writer from Lemnos, Greece. His two books Κάστρο ηλιόκαστρο (Athens, 1980, published by Τεχνικαί Εκδόσεις ΕΠΕ) and Το τετράδιο του γυρισμού (Athens, 1987, published by Σύγχρονη Εποχή) are illustrated by himself and set forth his childhood memories from Myrina, Lemnos, from the 1930s and 1940s. He died in 2010. Rhallis Kopsidis and George Chochlidakis, who were inspired by the Macedonian school (11th-14th centuries) and the Cretan School (14th-17th centuries) painted around 1960, the church's Byzantine frescoes of the Chevetogne Abbey (Belgium).
