= Raleigh Township =

Raleigh Township may refer to the following townships:

- Raleigh Township, Ontario, Canada
- Raleigh Township, Saline County, Illinois, USA
- Raleigh Township, Wake County, North Carolina, USA
