= Chevetogne Abbey =

Benedictine Latin and Byzantine Catholic monastery in Belgium

Coordinates: 50°13′5″N 5°7′57″E

Chevetogne Monastery
- Abbaye de Chevetogne
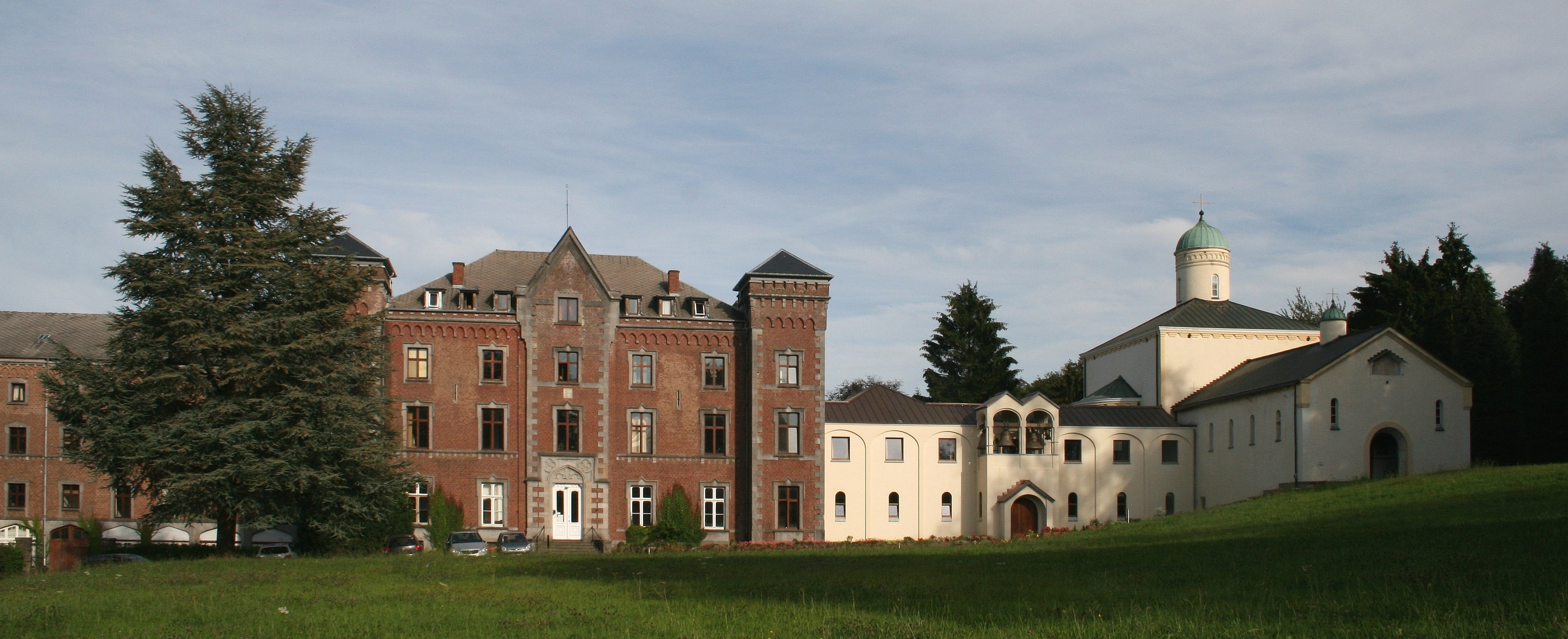
- Chevetogne Abbey
- Interactive map of Chevetogne Monastery

Monastery information
- Order: Benedictines
- Denomination: Catholic Church
- Established: 1925

People
- Founder: Lambert Beauduin

Site
- Location: Ciney, Belgium
- Website: https://monasteredechevetogne.com/

Chevetogne Abbey (French: Abbaye de Chevetogne), also known as the Monastery of the Holy Cross, is a Catholic Benedictine monastery dedicated to Christian unity located in the Belgian village of Chevetogne in the municipality of Ciney, province of Namur, halfway between Brussels and Luxembourg. Currently, the monastery has 27 monks.

== History ==
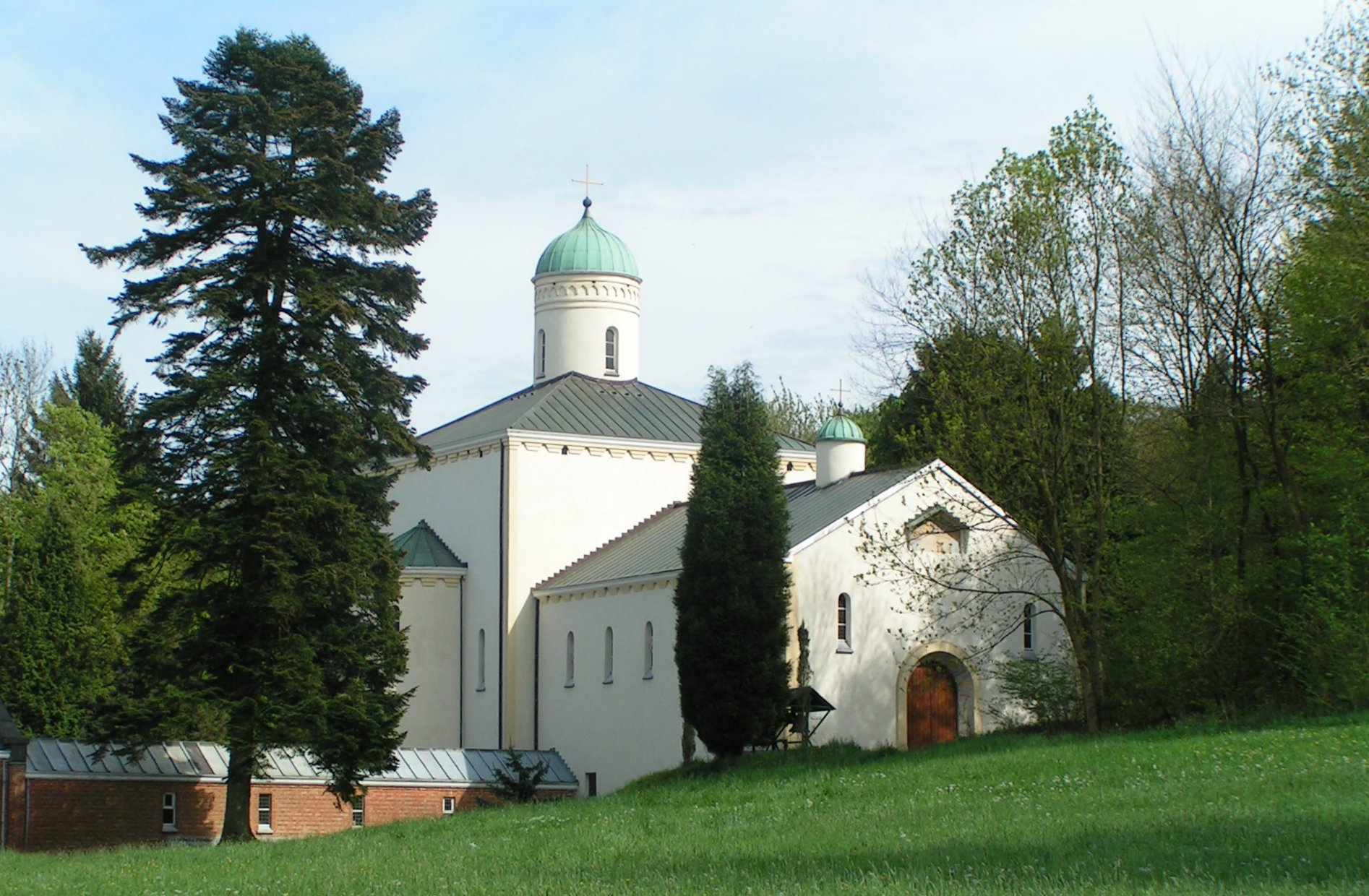
Chevetogne Abbey: Byzantine church

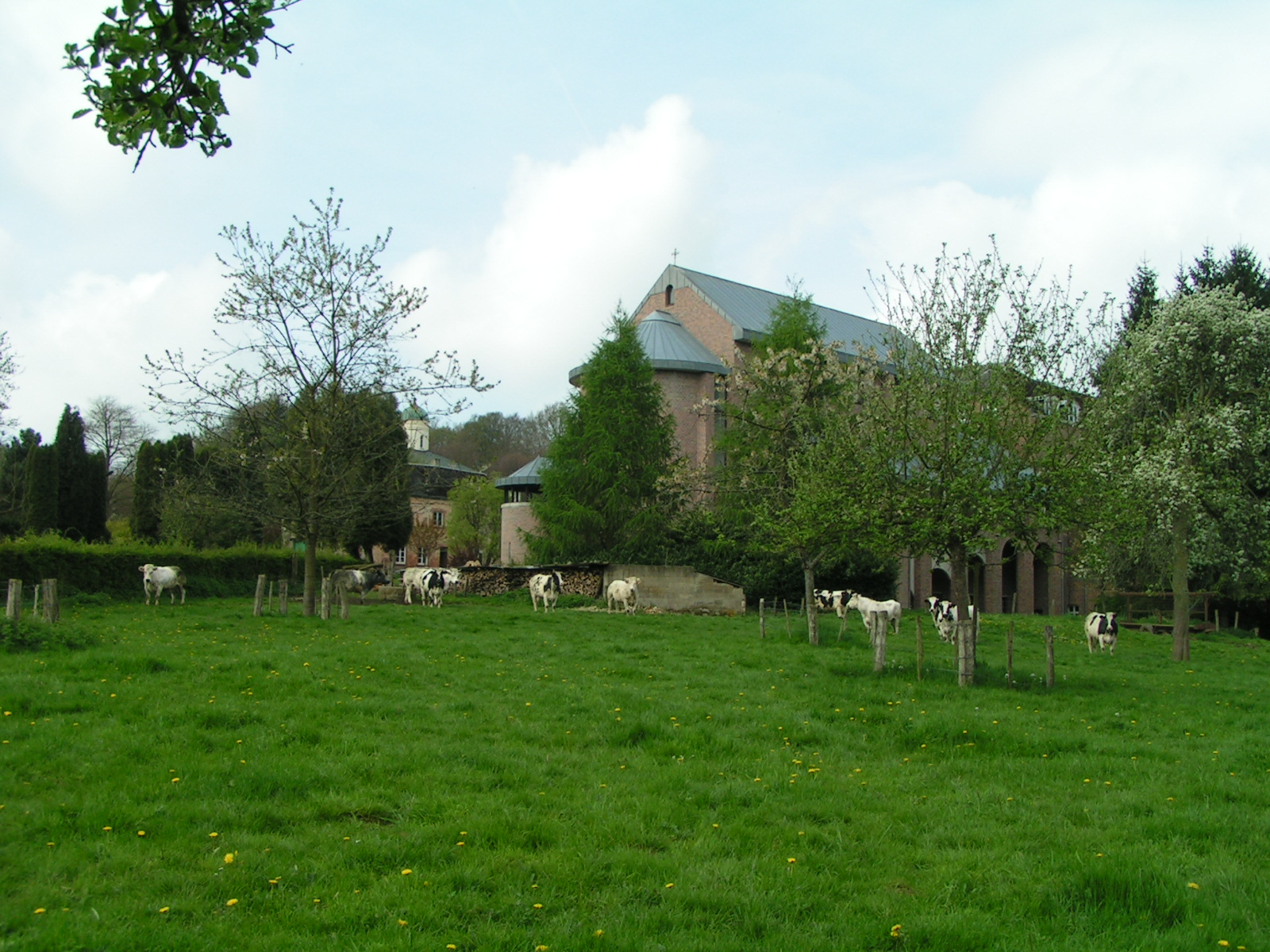
Chevetogne Abbey: Latin church

In 1924 Pope Pius XI addressed the apostolic letter "Equidem verba" to the Benedictine Order encouraging them to work for the reunion of the Catholic and Eastern Churches, with particular emphasis on the Russian Orthodox Church. The following year, a community was established by Dom Lambert Beauduin (1873–1960) at Amay, on the river Meuse. Because of Beauduin's close friendship with Cardinal Mercier and Pope John XXIII, as well as his relations with Eastern Christians, he became a pioneer of the Catholic Ecumenical movement. His initial focus was on unity with Orthodox and Anglicans, but was eventually extended to all those who bear the name of Christ.

In 1939, the community of Amay Priory moved to its current location at Chevetogne, occupying a former Jesuit novitiate. Since then, an Eastern church was built in 1957 and painted with frescos by Rallis Kopsidis and Georges Chochlidakis, and a Western church was completed with a library in its basement. The library has approximately 100,000 volumes and subscribes to about 500 specialized journals and periodicals. Chevetogne Priory was raised to the status of an abbey on 11 December 1990.

== Life of the monastery ==
As an expression of its commitment to Christian unity, the monastery has both Latin Church and Eastern Catholic (Byzantine rite) chapels where there are services every day. While the canonical hours of the daily monastic office are served separately, the monks share their meals together and are united under one abbot. Along with prayer, the monks engage in publishing a journal, Irénikon, since 1926.

== Monks ==
- Dom Philippe Bär
- Dom Lambert Beauduin
- Dom Michel Van Parys
- Dom Nicolas Egender

== Gallery ==
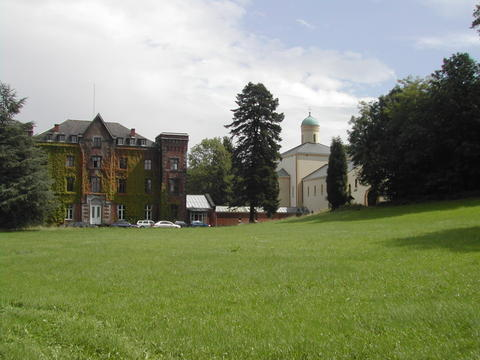
General view of the main building and the Eastern church

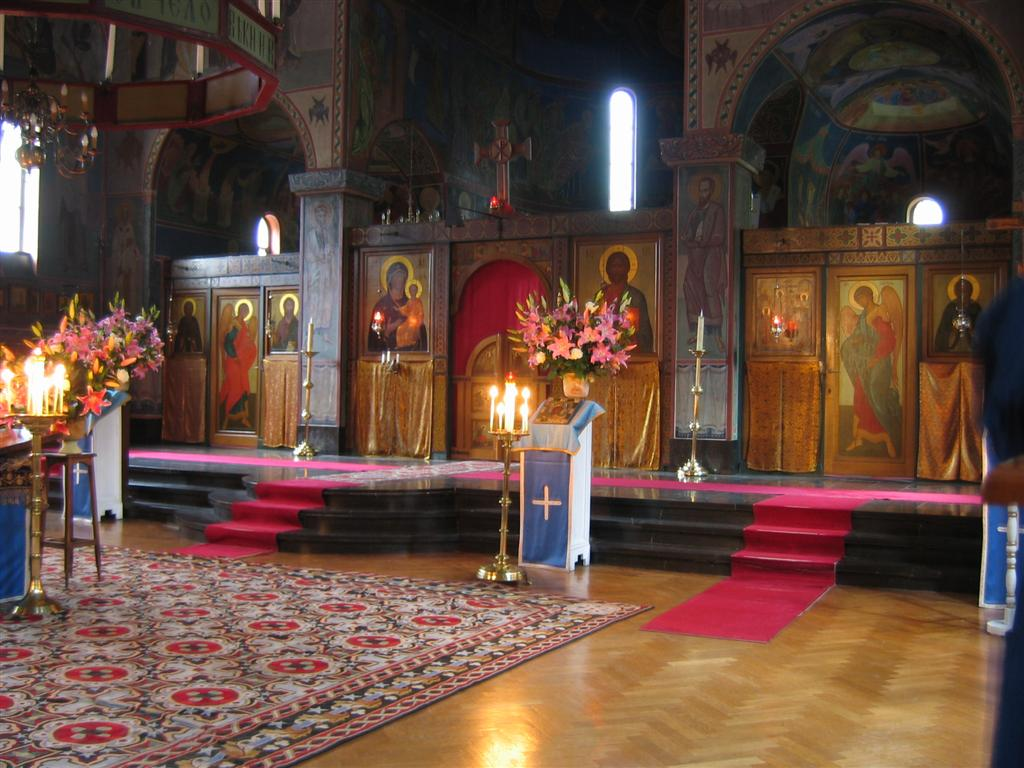
Interior of the Eastern church

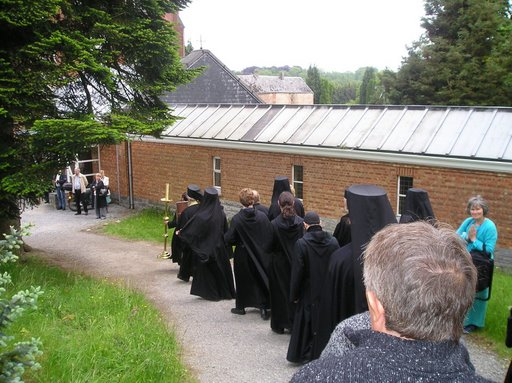
Procession to the refectory on Pentecost
