= Soothill (surname) =

Soothill is a surname, and may refer to:

- John Soothill (1925–2004), English medical doctor
- Keith Soothill (1941–2014), British criminologist
- William Edward Soothill (1861–1935), British Methodist missionary to China and academic
