= Sanjiang Church =

Church in Yongjia County, China

Coordinates: 28.04694°N 120.69170°E

Sanjiang Church (三江基督教堂) was a Christian church located in Yongjia County, near Wenzhou, in Zhejiang Province, China. The church was completed in December 2013. The city of Wenzhou is a port city believed to have China's largest Christian community. Local Christians claim as many as 15 percent of the residents Christians with the majority being Protestant. British missionaries George and Grace Stott had set up churches in this area towards the end of the 19th century.

The Sanjiang Church was completed in 2013 after almost six years and after local Christians pooled together between 3.2 and 4.9 million US dollars (20-30 million yuan) for the construction costs. The building was large enough to hold up to 2,000 people with the church complex occupying more than 100,000 square feet of land. The church had been registered with the government authorities. The demolition was preceded by a petition by local believers of the Chinese folk faith accusing the church to disrupt the area's feng shui (cosmic harmony), highlighting the tensions between indigenous religious groups and Christianity.

== 2014 protests ==
In April 2014, thousands of Chinese Christians camped around a church to prevent it from being demolished after several crosses had been torn down. In February 2014, local officials began an antireligious campaign to demolish any church buildings that violated local regulations. Local Christians claim that Communist Party officials object to the bright, prominent crosses that some churches use to advertise their presence and want these crosses to be replaced with smaller crosses inside. Government officials claim that the building is structurally unsound.

== Demolition ==
As of April 28, 2014, the entire church had been toppled over.
