= Homer H. Dubs =

American sinologist (1892–1969)

- Born: March 28, 1892; Deerfield, Illinois, U.S.
- Died: August 16, 1969 (aged 77); Oxford, England
- Education: Yale University (BA); Columbia University (MA); Union Theological Seminary (BD); University of Chicago (PhD)
- Scientific career
- Fields: Sinology
- Workplaces: Oxford University; Marshall University
- Notable students: David Hawkes

Chinese name
- Traditional Chinese: 德效騫
- Simplified Chinese: 德效骞
Transcriptions
Standard Mandarin
- Hanyu Pinyin: Dé Xiàoqiān
- Gwoyeu Romatzyh: Der Shiawchian
- Wade–Giles: Te Hsiao-ch'ien

Homer Hasenpflug Dubs (March 28, 1892 – August 16, 1969) was an American sinologist. Though best known for his translation of sections of Ban Gu's Book of Han, he published on a wide range of topics in ancient Chinese history, astronomy and philosophy. Raised in China as the son of missionaries, he returned to the United States and earned a Ph.D. in philosophy (1925). He taught at University of Minnesota and Marshall College before undertaking the Han shu translation project at the behest of the American Council of Learned Societies. Subsequently, Dubs taught at Duke University, Columbia University and Hartford Seminary. In 1947, Dubs moved to England to take up the Chair of Chinese at Oxford University, which had been vacant since 1935. He retired in 1959 and remained in Oxford until his death in 1969.

== Early years ==
Homer H. Dubs, like many early American sinologists, had his introduction to the subject as the child of missionary parents in China. Born in Deerfield, Illinois, he spent his childhood in Hunan Province. He studied briefly at Oberlin College and then graduated from Yale University (1914) with a major in philosophy. Subsequently, he earned an A.M. in philosophy at Columbia University and a B.D. at Union Theological Seminary in the City of New York. He returned to China as a missionary, studying Chinese in Nanjing before moving on to work in Hunan. Returning from China, Dubs attended the University of Chicago and earned a Ph.D. in philosophy in 1925 with a dissertation entitled "The Philosophy of Hsüntze: Ancient Confusionism [sic] as Developed in the Philosophy of Hsüntze", which was the basis for his later two-volume work on the Xunzi. After receiving his degree, Dubs taught philosophy, first at University of Minnesota (1925–27) and then at Marshall College (1927–34).

== Research and publishing ==
Throughout his life, Dubs researched and published on a wide range of topics in Chinese philosophy and history. In the mid-1930s he was commissioned by the American Council of Learned Societies to undertake the work for which he would become best known, a translation of Ban Gu's Han shu. During 1934-37, Dubs worked on the translation assiduously with three Chinese collaborators, Jen T'ai, C.H. Ts'ui, and P'an Lo-chi. They produced a copiously annotated three-volume translation of the "Annals" section of the Han shu (chapters 1-12) and the three chapters (99 A, B & C) devoted to Wang Mang, published under the title History of the Former Han Dynasty (Baltimore, 1938–55). The first two volumes were awarded the coveted Prix Stanislas Julien of the Académie des Inscriptions et Belles-Lettres. Two companion volumes, including a prolegomena and a glossary were planned.

Dubs' publications on China (he remained interested in philosophy throughout his life) were characterized by solid scholarship and an extraordinary breadth of interests. He did pioneering work on ancient Chinese astronomy, in particular the observance of eclipses. But the breadth of his education and interests combined with a fertile mind to lead him into curious directions. One was his development of an idiosyncratic system of romanization in which the Chinese characters were replaced by a system of letters and numbers that indicated the pronunciation, tone and constituent elements of the original Chinese graph. Thus, Qian Han shu (Wade Giles Ch'ien Han shu) 前漢書 was rendered Ts'ien2R Han4SU-shu1WE. Although he represented his system as a variation on the widely used Wade Giles romanization, the field declined to adopt his "Wade-Dubs" system. Indeed, it was his insistence on using the system for the remaining volumes of History of the Former Han Dynasty that prevented them from being published.

Another direction Dubs' interests took him was the pursuit of contacts between Han China and the Roman empire. He wrote several articles on the subject, culminating in the controversial A Roman City in Ancient China. This work purported to show that a Roman legion that had been part of the army of Marcus Licinius Crassus defeated at the Battle of Carrhae in 53 B.C. had settled in Northwestern China. The defeated legion, Dubs speculated, had been relocated further east by the victorious Parthians, for whom they fought in a battle against the Han. Defeated again, they were settled at a place called Liqian located in modern Yongchang County, Jinchang, Gansu province. Although this story has been seized upon by enthusiastic Chinese of the area and non specialist Westerners, at least two eminent Chinese authorities have shown that the notion has serious shortcomings.

== Later teaching and activities ==
Following publication of the first volume of History of the Former Han Dynasty, Dubs taught at Duke University and its Divinity School, Columbia and the Hartford Seminary. He also worked on the Chinese History Project of the Institute of Pacific Relations with Karl August Wittfogel at Columbia University. Finally, in 1947 he was invited to join the faculty at Oxford University, where he took up the chair of Chinese that had been occupied by eminent pioneer Sinologists James Legge and William Edward Soothill. He retired from Oxford in 1959 and subsequently spent the 1962-63 academic year at the University of Hawai'i and lecturing in Australia. He lived in Oxford until his death in 1969.

As a person, Dubs was characterized by his generosity and his eccentricity. He was once described as a "Spinozan saint who had missed some of the bigger academic plums because he wouldn't press his pants" and offended some of the Oxford dons by parking his motorcycle in the hallway. Like some others at Oxford, he also dabbled a bit in the occult. But he was an erudite and respected scholar, and his former student David Hawkes remembered "was always able to relate what he studied as an academic with what he had lived through as a younger man and to remind us by anecdote or example that the ancient texts he taught formed part of a continuum with the living present."

At Professor Dubs' death, the material planned for the two companion volumes to the History of the Former Han Dynasty remained unpublished. A group of scholars reworked the manuscripts – said to total over 1000 pages – to replace the romanization and render it acceptable to an academic press. Responsibility for it was taken over by the Han Dynasty History Project at the University of Washington, where Wittfogel had gone after leaving Columbia. Unfortunately, at the death of the Han Project's director, Jack Dull, the manuscript still had not been published, and with the end of the project, the materials were scattered and some of them lost. Recently, however, the [Glossary] materials have been recovered and are gradually being made available on-line, as have been the three volumes of History of the Former Han Dynasty. Together with the already published materials, they constitute a nearly complete translation or paraphrase of the entire Han shu.

== Publications ==
- Hsüntze: The Moulder of Ancient Confucianism. Probsthain's Oriental Series 15. London, 1927.
- (trans.) The Works of Hsüntze. Probsthain's Oriental Series 16. London,1927.
- Rational Induction: An Analysis of the Method of Science and Philosophy. Chicago: The University of Chicago Press, 1930.
- (trans.) The History of the Former Han Dynasty. 3 vols. Baltimore: Waverly, 1938–55. Digitized text. (Digitized text does not retain volume or page numbers and alters Dubs' footnote numbering.) Glossary.
- "Did Confucius Study the Book of Changes?" T'oung Pao 25 (1928): 82-90.
- "The Failure of the Chinese to Produce Philosophic Systems." T'oung Pao 26 (1929): 96-109.
- "'Nature' in the Teaching of Confucius." Journal of the American Oriental Society 50 (1930): 233-37.
- "A Comparison of Greek and Chinese Philosophy." Chinese Social and Political Science Review 17.2 (1933): 307-27.
- "Solar Eclipses During the Former Han Period." Osiris 5 (1938): 499-532.
- "The Victory of Han Confucianism." Journal of the American Oriental Society 58 (1938): 435-39.
- "Wang Mang and His Economic Reforms." T'oung Pao 35 (1940): 219-65.
- "An Ancient Military Contact Between Romans and Chinese." American Journal of Philology 42 (1941): 322-30.
- A Roman Influence Upon Chinese Painting." Classical Philology 38 (1943): 13–19.
- "An Ancient Chinese Mystery Cult." 'Harvard Theological Review' 35 (1942): 221-40.
- (with Robert S. Smith) "Chinese in Mexico City in 1635." "The Far Eastern Quarterly" 1.4 (1942): pp. 387–389.
- "A Military Contact Between Chinese and Romans in 36 B.C." T'oung Pao 36 (1942): 64-80.
- "The Political Career of Confucius." Journal of the American Oriental Society 66 (1946): 273-82.
- "The Reliability of Chinese Histories." Far Eastern Quarterly 6.1 (1946): 23-43.
- "Taoism." In H. F. MacNair, ed. China. United Nations Series. Berkeley: University of California Press, 1946: 266-89.
- "The Beginnings of Alchemy." Isis 38 (1947): 62-86.
- "The Date of Confucius' Birth." Asia Major (new series) 1.2 (1949): 139-46.
- "The Date of the Shang Period." T'oung Pao 40.4-5 (1951): 323-35.
- "Mencius and Sun-dz on Human Nature." Philosophy East and West 6 (1956): 213-22.
- A Roman City in Ancient China. China Society Sinological Series 5.London, 1957.
- "The Beginnings of Chinese Astronomy." Journal of the American Oriental Society 78 (1958): 295-300.
- "The Archaic Royal Jou Religion." T'oung Pao 46 (1958): 217-59.
- "Han 'Hill Censers.'" In Søren Egerod, and Else Glahn. Studia Serica Bernhard Karlgren Dedicata. Sinological Studies Dedicated to Bernhard Karlgren on His Seventieth Birthday, October Fifth, 1959. Copenhagen: E. Munksgaard, 1959, 259-64.
