= Paths of Glory (disambiguation) =

Paths of Glory is a 1957 American anti-war film co-written and directed by Stanley Kubrick.

Paths of Glory may also refer to:

== Literature ==
- Paths of glory, from Thomas Gray's poem "Elegy Written in a Country Churchyard: "The paths of glory lead but to the grave"
- Paths of Glory (Archer novel), a 2009 novel on Everest by Jeffrey Archer
- Paths of Glory (Cobb novel), a 1935 novel by Humphrey Cobb, the basis of the Stanley Kubrick film
- Paths of Glory, a 1915 book written by Irvin S. Cobb; a non-fiction account of his journalistic experiences during World War I
- Paths of Glory, a 1935 play by Sidney Howard, based on Humphrey Cobb's novel

== Other uses in arts, entertainment, and media ==
- Paths of Glory (board game), a wargame about World War I
- Paths of Glory (painting), a 1917 painting by Christopher Nevinson
- "Paths of Glory" (The Simpsons), a 2015 episode of The Simpsons
- "Paths of Glory", a song by the American rock band Faith No More, from Album of the Year
