= Alexander Hosie (disambiguation) =

Alexander Hosie was a Scottish diplomat, traveller and botanical collector.

Alexander Hosie may also refer to:

- Alec Hosie (1890–1957), English cricketer, his son
