= Belhelvie =

Village in Aberdeenshire, Scotland

Coordinates: 57.249°N 2.088°W

Belhelvie: Scottish Gaelic: Baile Shealbhaigh
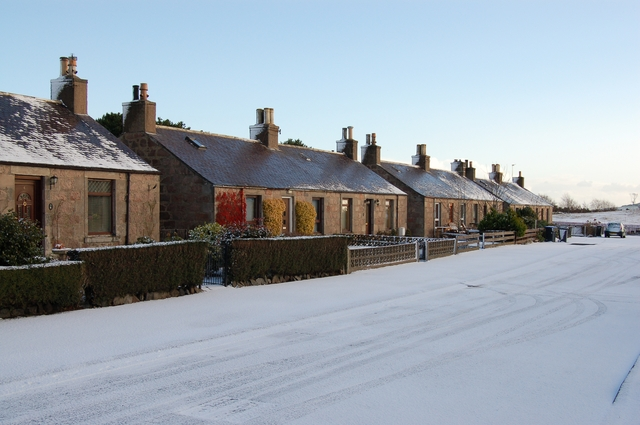
- Park Terrace in Belhelvie

- Location within Aberdeenshire
- Population: 3,802 (2001)
- OS grid reference: NJ9417
- Civil parish: Belhelvie
- Council area: Aberdeenshire
- Lieutenancy area: Aberdeenshire
- Country: Scotland
- Sovereign state: United Kingdom
- Post town: ABERDEEN
- Postcode district: AB23
- Dialling code: 01358
- Police: Scotland
- Fire: Scottish
- Ambulance: Scottish
- UK Parliament: Gordon and Buchan
- Scottish Parliament: Aberdeenshire East

Belhelvie (Scottish Gaelic: Baile Shealbhaigh) is a small village and civil parish in Aberdeenshire in Scotland. The parish has a population of 3,802, of which 1,653 are in the village. The history of the parish is available online. The churchyard contains a notable example of a morthouse used against the activities of bodysnatchers in the early 19th century.

== Notable people ==
- David Lindsay, minister of Belhelvie and prominent Covenanter (d. 1667)
- General Sir Peter Lumsden, born at Belhelvie Lodge, 1829
- General Sir Harry Lumsden
- Reverend Alexander John Forsyth, Inventor of the Percussion cap.
- George Stott (1835-1889), Christian missionary with the China Inland Mission
- Sir Frederick Stewart, FRS (1916-2001), studied local geology.
- Steve Murdoch, Professor of Scottish history at the University of St Andrews and co-author of Belhelvie: A Millennium of History (Belhelvie Community Council, 2001).

== See also ==
- List of listed buildings in Belhelvie
