= Alexander Hosie =

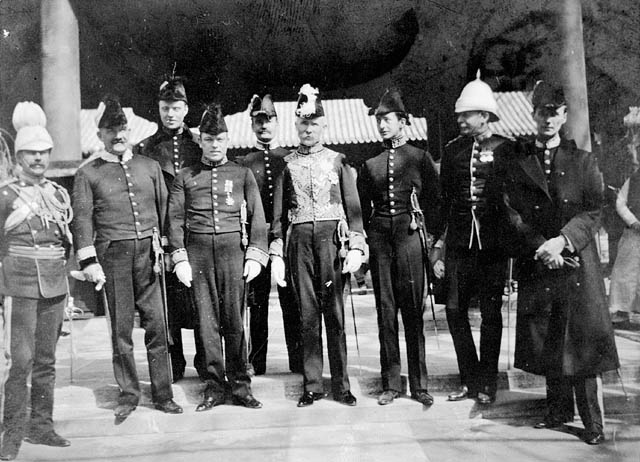
Sir Alexander Hosie at the Forbidden Palace in 1909, between Col. Michael Willoughby (extreme left) and Joseph Addison

Sir Alexander Hosie (1853–1925) was a Scottish diplomat, traveller and botanical collector.

== Early life ==
He was born at Inverurie where his father was farming, the second child of Alexander Hosie (died 1869) and his wife Jean Anderson. He was brought up in Aberdeen, and was educated at Old Aberdeen Grammar School. He graduated from King's College, Aberdeen in 1872.

== In China ==
Joining the consular service, Hosie in 1876 travelled to China with John Newell Jordan. He was trained as an interpreter in Beijing, and then was in Shanghai. In 1882 he was posted to Chongqing in Sichuan, where he travelled extensively. He encountered William Mesny at Chengdu in 1883.

A series of further junior postings to Chinese cities, during which Hosie married, led up to a consular position in Wuzhou. In 1893 he wrote a commercial report on Formosa.

In 1900 Hosie took a boat journey from Khabarovsk to Blagoveshchensk, along the river boundary between the Chinese and Russian Empires. Appointed first consul-general at Chengdu in 1903, he journeyed to the eastern border of Tibet. He found that the British expedition to Tibet of this period had in East Tibet created serious disturbance and tension. At the stele in a mountain pass that by tradition marked the boundary of Sichuan and Kham, he met with a confrontation between Chinese and Khampa soldiers. In 1907 Hosie received a knighthood.

Hosie was the British delegate at the Shanghai International Opium Commission of 1909. He retired in 1912.

== Learned societies ==
Hosie became a member of the Royal Asiatic Society in 1877, and was a Fellow of the Royal Geographical Society.

== Collector ==
Hosie was a prolific collector of botanical specimens, for Kew Gardens and other institutions. The plant genus Hosiea and tree Ormosia hosiei were named for Hosie by Kew.

== Works ==
- Three Years In Western China (1890), introduction by Archibald John Little. It deals with the provinces of Sichuan, Guizhou and Yunnan.
- Manchuria: Its Peoples, Resources and Recent History (1901)
- Mr Hosie's Journey to Tibet, 1904: A Report by Mr A. Hosie, His Majesty's Consul at Chengtu, on a Journey from Chengtu to the Eastern Frontier of Tibet
- On the Trail of the Opium Poppy (2 vols., 1914)
- Szechwan, its products, industries and resources (1922)

== Ethnography ==
Three Years in Western China included a linguistic report on the Lolo people, and on the Phö indigenous language of Guizhou. Hosie took an interest in the Miao people and indigenous groups in China generally, and noted that their study had been neglected.

== Family ==
Hosie married firstly in 1887 Florence Lindsay (died 1905), daughter of John Lindsay of Aberdeen; they had one son, the cricketer Alec Hosie. He married secondly, in 1913, Dorothea Soothill (1885–1959), daughter of William Edward Soothill.
