= Thomas Lowndes Bullock =

British Colonial Administrator and Academic

Thomas Lowndes Bullock FRS
- Born: 27 September 1845; Radwinter, Essex, England
- Died: 25 March 1915 (aged 69); London, England
- Education: Winchester College; New College, Oxford
- Occupations: Colonial Administrator and Academic
- Spouse: Florence Louisa Elizabeth Horton
- Children: 2 including Guy Henry Bullock

Thomas Lowndes Bullock, FRS (27 September 1845 – 20 March 1915) was an English author, colonial administrator, academic and sinologist who served as Professor of Chinese at the University of Oxford. He was the father of diplomat and explorer Guy Bullock.

== Early life ==
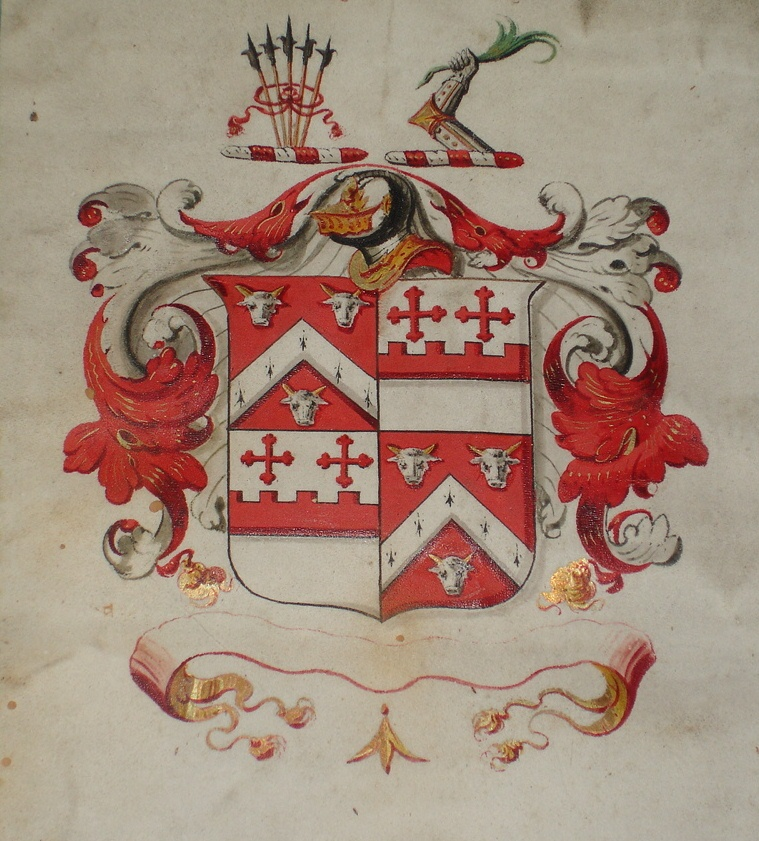
Arms – Bullock quartering Watson 1810

Bullock was born in Radwinter, Essex to John Frederick Bullock (1809 - 1865), Rector of Radwinter, and his first-cousin, Elizabeth Anne Bullock (born 1814), daughter of Jonathan Bullock of Faulkbourne and Margaret Downes. He was a member of the old Bullock family of the Faulkbourne branch of the family, descended from Sir Edward Bullock. He attended Winchester College and New College, Oxford.

== Career ==
Following University, Bullock was appointed as a member of Her Britannic Majesty's consular service in China from 1869 to 1897. He was appointed a Barrister of the Inner Temple in 1890. From 1899 he went on to be appointed Professor of Chinese at the University of Oxford, a position now called Shaw Professor of Chinese following the donation of Sir Run Run Shaw.

== Family ==
Bullock married Florence Louisa Elizabeth Horton, daughter of Samuel Lewis Horton of The Park House, Shifnal and Ann Maria Philips, they had three children:

- Agnes Violet Bullock, 1884 - 1897.
- Margaret Annie Bullock, born 1886, married in 1920 to Sir Claud Severn, and had issue.
- Guy Henry Bullock, British diplomat, born 1887, married in 1916 to Laura Alice McGloin.

== Publications ==
=== Books ===
- Progressive Exercises In The Chinese Written Language, 1901
- Progressive Exercises in the Chinese Written Language, 2nd edition, revised and enlarged, 1912

=== Articles ===
- "A Trip into the Interior of Formosa". Proceedings of the Royal Geographical Society of London. Vol. 21. 1877. pp. 266, 272.
- "The Great Mahomedan Rebellion in Yunnan". The China Review. Vol. 16. 1887. pp. 83, 95.
- (tr.) Peking Gazettes (1887–89)
- "Intercourse in the Past between China and Foreign Countries". The Imperial And Asiatic Quarterly Review And Oriental And Colonial Record. Vol. 8. 1899.
