= George Stott (missionary) =

British missionary

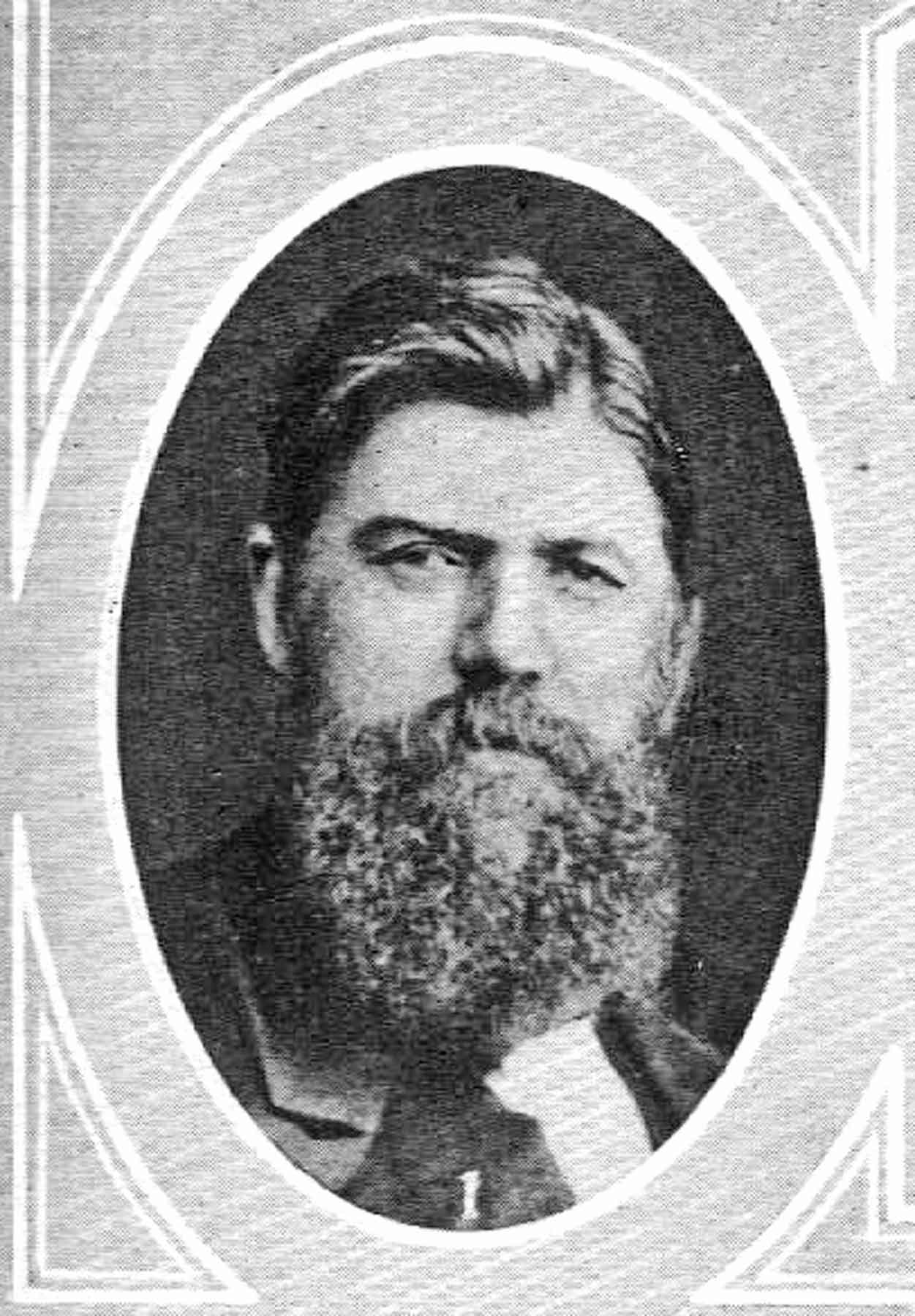
- Missionary to China
- Born: 13 April 1835; Belhelvie, Aberdeenshire, Scotland
- Died: 21 April 1889 (aged 54); Route de Grasse, Cannes, France

George Stott (13 April 1835 – 21 April 1889) was a British Protestant Christian missionary to China with the China Inland Mission.

Despite physical disabilities, Stott was a highly effective mission leader. In China he has been credited, alongside William Edward Soothill, for laying the groundwork for the large number of Christian adherents in Wenzhou, Zhejiang Province. Although his wife, Grace Stott worked with him and led the mission for twenty years after his death.

== Early life and education ==
Born in Belhelvie, Aberdeenshire, Scotland, the son of John Stott, a crofter, and his wife, Jane Anderson. Stott initially worked in agriculture, but due to a serious knee injury at the age of nineteen, a subsequent leg amputation and evangelical Christian conversion, he became a schoolmaster and active member of the Free Church of Scotland.

== Mission Work in China ==
In early 1865, Stott learnt that James Hudson Taylor was looking to recruit pioneer missionaries for his non-denominational China Inland Mission. Stott was duly hired, provided with a new artificial leg and set sail for China on October 4, 1865. Arriving in Shanghai on February 6, 1866, Stott quickly relocated to the port city of Wenzhou in Zhejiang province, where Christian teaching had been previously unknown. The oldest church in the city, Chengxi Christian Church, still stands as a testimony to his work. As a result of the ongoing influence brought there by the Stotts and others, Wenzhou is known in China as the “Jerusalem of the East” because in the entire Wenzhou Municipality, which has 6 million inhabitants, there are more than 600,000 evangelical Protestants – 10% of the population.

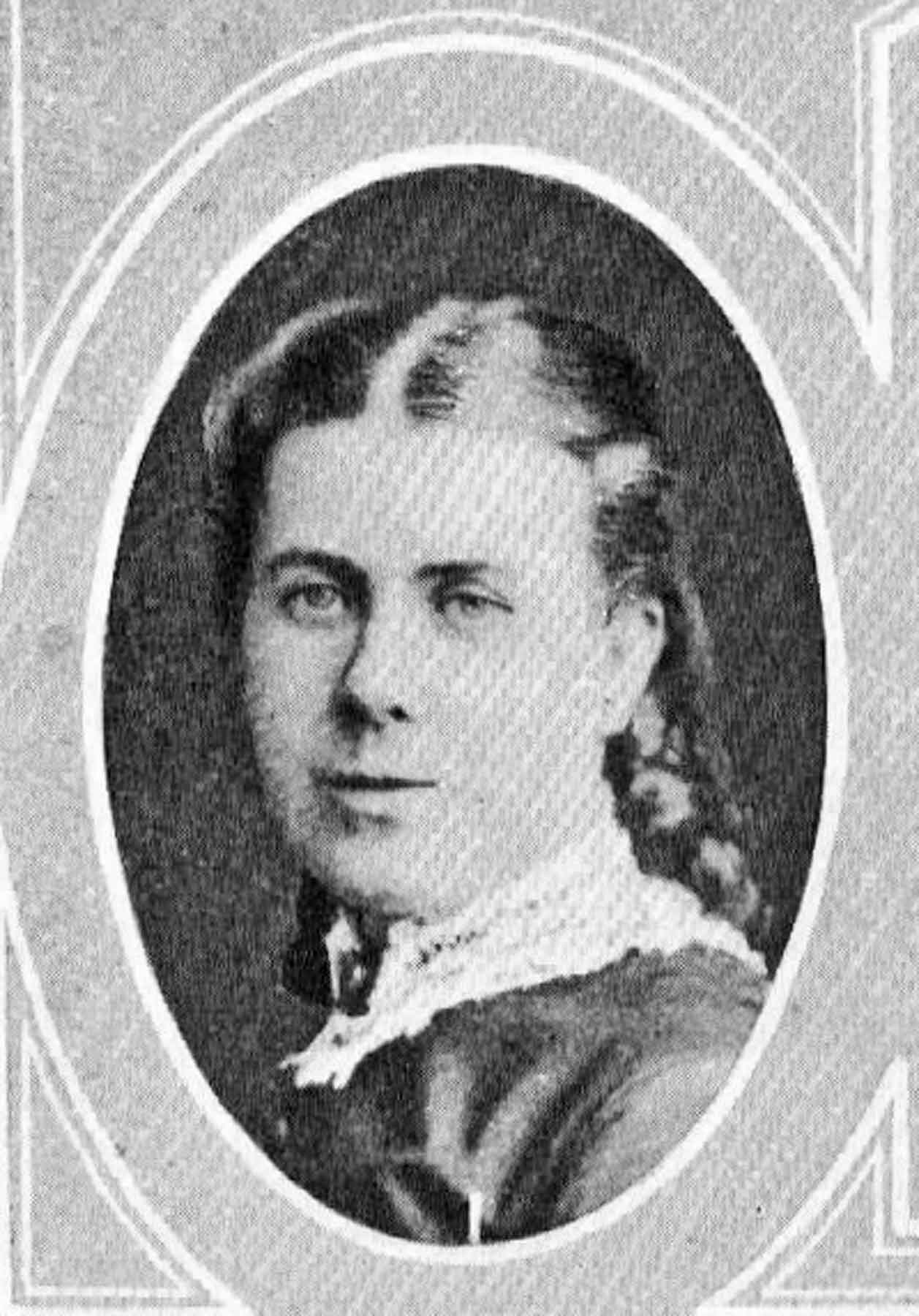
Grace Ciggie Stott

His wife Grace Ciggie wrote of his early life:

"Mr. Stott had been brought up to farm work, but when he was about nineteen years of age he slipped on the road and knocked his knee against a stone. This simple accident resulted in white swelling, which, two years later, necessitated the amputation of the left leg. For nine months he lay a helpless invalid, and it was during this time that the Lord graciously saved his soul. So far he had been careless and indifferent to the love of God in Christ Jesus, but now, in his helpless condition, and what seemed his ruined future, how precious that love became! After his recovery he began to teach in a school, and had been thus employed several years when he first heard of China's needs through a friend, who himself was going out. "

George Stott

"In accepting Mr. Stott for mission work, Hudson Taylor manifested faith, for no Society would have sent an amputee to such a country to pioneer work, and Mr. Stott often referred with gratitude to Mr. Taylor's acceptance of him. When asked why he, with only one leg, should think of going to China, his remark was,

" I do not see those with two legs going, so I must." "

His wife and his followers learnt to handle his manner which could be direct. He increasingly came into conflict with Hudson Taylor and offered to resign in a protest letter. The CIM stopped sending recruits to his station and eventually they "let him go". Stott found out that he had cancer and he and Grace returned to Scotland.

Stott died at William Thomas Berger's house on April 21, 1889 on Easter morning, at half-past six in Cannes. He and his wife had returned from China after their mission was destroyed by rioters in 1884. Grace returned to China and re-established the mission in Wenzhou. She led the mission and eventually retired in 1909 and died in Canada in 1922.
