= Guy Bullock =

British diplomat and mountaineer

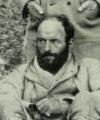
Guy Bullock on the 1921 Everest reconnaissance expedition

Guy Henry Bullock (23 July 1887 – 12 April 1956) was a British diplomat who is best known for his participation in the 1921 British Mount Everest reconnaissance expedition. As expedition mountaineers, he and George Mallory found a northern access route to Everest by climbing the 6,849-metre (22,470 ft) Lhakpa La col above the East Rongbuk Glacier and by going on to reach the North Col at 7,020 metres (23,030 ft). They did not, however, reach the summit of Mount Everest.

== Early years ==
Guy Bullock was born in 1887 in Beijing, the son of Thomas Lowndes Bullock, a member of the Radwinter branch of the Bullock family, and Florence Louisa Elizabeth Horton. Thomas Bullock was Professor of Chinese at Oxford University in 1899, and British Consul to China. Guy had an older sister.

Bullock was educated at Winchester College, where he was a member of the school's Ice Club along with Mallory who was his climbing partner. In 1905, he joined Mallory and the Winchester schoolmaster Graham Irving in the Pennine Alps where they reached the summit of the 4,356-metre (14,291 ft) Dent Blanche. In 1906, he played cricket for Winchester against Eton College.

Bullock was elected to the Alpine Club in 1909 at the early age of 22.

In 1916. he married an American, Laura Alice McGloin.

== Diplomatic career ==
Bullock had a 34-year career in the British Consular Service starting in 1913 when his first posting was to New Orleans to deal with British refugees from the Mexican Revolution. In 1914, he was sent to Fernando Pó where he organised operations against the German Cameroons in the run-up to World War I. By 1916, he was in Marseille and moved on to Lima in 1917. In 1922, he was posted to Le Havre, followed by Zagreb in 1926 and also to Addis Ababa. In 1935 he became British consul in Lyon. While posted to Ecuador (1938–1941), he climbed Cotopaxi and became the first person to take photographs of the crater. In 1944 he became Consul-General for French Equatorial Africa.

After World War II an SS Black Book was discovered of over 2,000 Britons, and European exiles in Britain, who were to be arrested and eliminated following a successful German invasion of Great Britain. A "Harry Bullock" was included on this list, thought most likely to be a mistake for Guy Henry Bullock. He died in 1956 and was survived by his widow.

== 1921 Everest reconnaissance expedition ==
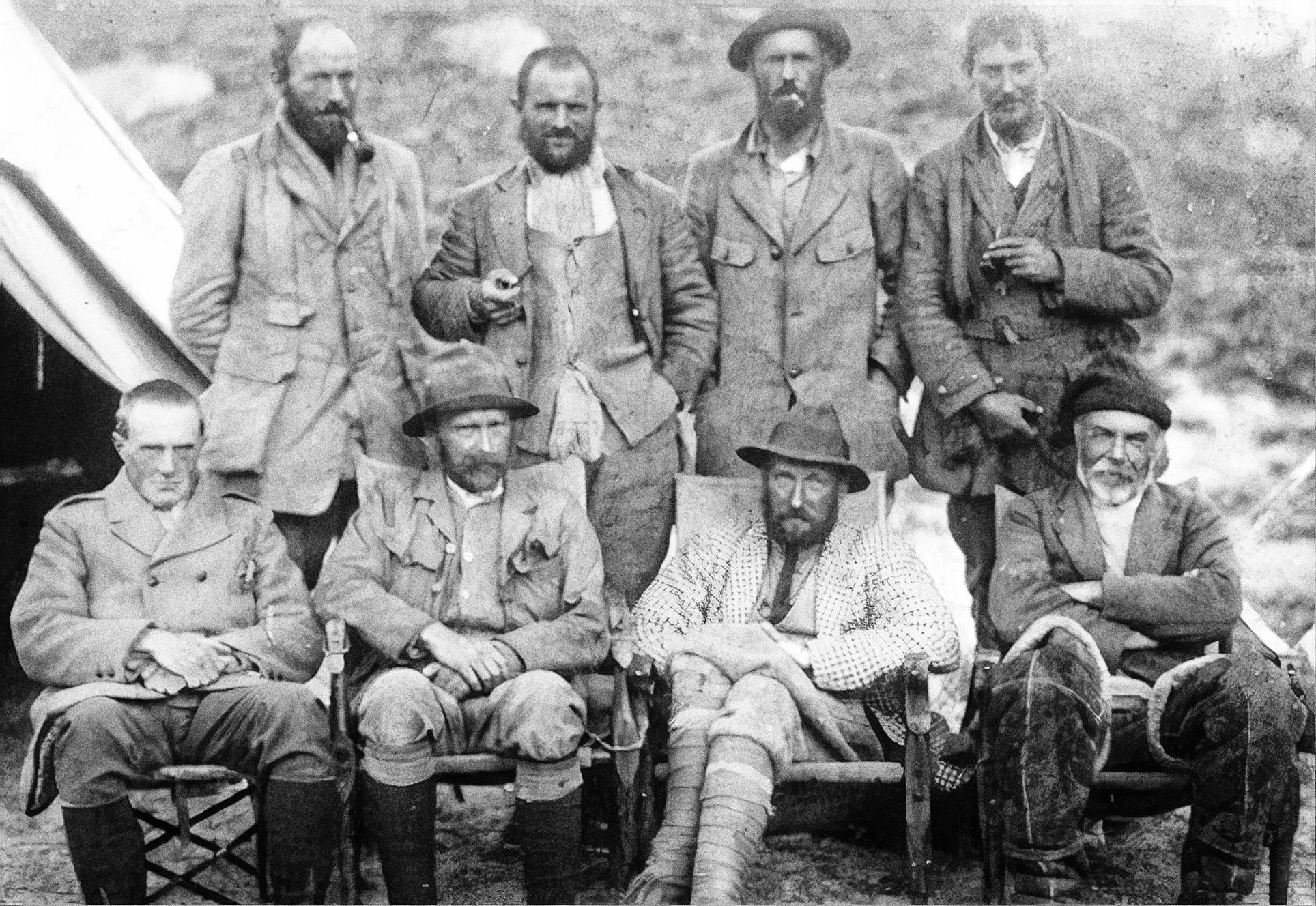
The back row shows (from left to right) Guy Bullock, Henry Morshead, Oliver Wheeler and George Mallory

Shortly before the 1921 Everest expedition was due to embark, one of the climbing team was asked to drop out and Mallory suggested Bullock as a replacement. He wrote to Sir Francis Younghusband, president of the Royal Geographical Society, that Bullock was "a scholar and a very good runner, the best long distance runner that anyone remembered in my time ... I feel that he would be a valuable man in the party".

The Foreign Office rejected Younghusband's request to grant leave to Bullock, who was in Lima at the time, to join the expedition but he gained a special dispensation from the British Foreign Secretary, Lord Curzon, so he could have leave on half pay until the end of 1921 but with no chance of this being renewed. Bullock and his wife sailed for Bombay on the SS Naldera, arriving on 30 April 1921.

The expedition had a climbing team of four but, of the two most experienced members, one died doing the march-in and the other was taken ill. This left only two main climbers, Mallory and Bullock himself. Exploring from the north, they thought that the route from the North Col to the summit looked feasible but that there seemed no good route up to the North Col from where they were, to the west. He and Mallory reached a pass from where they were the first to see the Western Cwm in Nepal. Later Bullock, on a one-man expedition, reached the Lho La pass from which he photographed the Khumbu Icefall for the first time.

To find out whether the North Col could be reached from the east, the whole expedition decamped to the Kharta region, hoping that the Kharta Chu river and valley would reach up to the North Col from the east. This approach led them to discover the Lhakpa La, where they found there was an intervening valley, the East Rongbuk Glacier. At the same time as they were discovering this, they received a message from the expedition's surveyor, Oliver Wheeler, to say that he had found the entrance to this same glacier at a point they had reached previously on their northern exploration – unfortunately they had failed to recognise its significance at the time. Without the time to return to the north after the monsoon, Bullock, Mallory and Wheeler traversed the Lhakpa La, descended to the East Rongbuk Glacier, and climbed to the North Col. At this point they were unable to go further and so had to return, which they safely did. Bullock was reunited with his wife at Lachen in the Teesta valley in Sikkim on 8 October and they eventually sailed home from Bombay.

Unlike Mallory who could be moody and forgetful, Bullock was a well-organised person, able to get on well with almost everybody. He was steady and cheerful, and so was a very good companion for Mallory, the better climber. In 1961 Graham Irving considered that Bullock had never received his fair share of the credit for the success of the expedition.

Bullock's diary of the expedition was published in 1962 in the Alpine Journal. Bullock had previously declined to lend the diary to Mallory who had been wanting to make use of it for his lectures after the expedition.

Jeffrey Archer's 2009 novel Paths of Glory contains a major character "Guy Bullock" (as well as a "George Mallory"). However, the book states: "This is a work of fiction. All of the characters, organizations, and events portrayed in this novel are either products of the author's imagination or are used fictitiously". This statement is to be relied upon.

He died in a London hospital in 1956.
