= David Hawkes (sinologist) =

British sinologist and translator (1923–2009)

- Born: 23 July 1923; London, England
- Died: 31 July 2009 (aged 86); Oxford, England
- Education: Christ Church, Oxford; Peking University
- Spouse: Jean Hawkes (m. 1950-2009, his death)
- Children: 4
- Scientific career
- Fields: Chinese translation
- Institutions: Oxford University
- Doctoral advisor: Homer H. Dubs

Chinese name
- Chinese: 霍克思
Transcriptions
Standard Mandarin
- Hanyu Pinyin: Huò Kèsī
- Wade–Giles: Huo K'o-ssu

David Hawkes (6 July 1923 – 31 July 2009) was a British sinologist and translator. After he was introduced to Japanese through codebreaking during the Second World War, Hawkes studied Chinese and Japanese at Oxford University between 1945 and 1947, before studying at Peking University from 1948 to 1951. He then returned to Oxford, where he completed his D.Phil. and later became Shaw Professor of Chinese. In 1971, Hawkes resigned his position to focus entirely on his translation of the famous Chinese novel The Story of the Stone (also known as Dream of the Red Chamber), which was published in three volumes between 1973 and 1980. He retired in 1984 to rural Wales before returning to live in Oxford in his final years.

Hawkes was known for his translations that preserved the "realism and poetry" of the original Chinese, and was the foremost non-Chinese Redology expert.

== Life and career ==
=== Early life ===
David Hawkes was born on 6 July 1923 in London, England, and grew up in East London. He entered Oxford University in 1942 as a student in Christ Church, where he studied the Latin and Greek Classics. After his first year, during the height of the Second World War, Hawkes was recruited to study Japanese in London. His talent for East Asian languages was soon recognized by his military superiors, and he was made an instructor to the Japanese codebreakers. After the war's end in 1945, Hawkes returned to Oxford, where he transferred from Classics into the newly established Honours School of Chinese, whose only teacher was the former missionary E. R. Hughes (1883–1956).

Hawkes studied at Oxford until 1947, when he decided to move to China to continue his studies at Peking University. Hawkes was so determined that he booked passage on a ship to Hong Kong without having received notice of his acceptance. The Chinese scholar Hu Shih, who then served as university president, was notorious for ignoring correspondence, and Hawkes' plans were saved only when the British poet William Empson, who was the only foreigner at the university, noticed Hawkes' letters and arranged for him to be accepted as a graduate student. The university was located in downtown Beijing (it later moved to the former site of Yenching University in Haidian District), and Hawkes lived in a rented room in a medieval hutong lane dwelling. He took courses in Chinese literature from noted scholars such as Luo Changpei and Yu Pingbo. Hawkes and his Chinese classmates were present in Tiananmen Square on 1 October 1949 to hear Mao Zedong's proclamation of the People's Republic of China following the Chinese Communist Party's defeat of Chiang Kai-shek and the Nationalist Party (Kuomintang) in the Chinese Civil War.

=== Marriage and career ===
In 1950, Hawkes was joined in Beijing by his fiancée, Jean, and the two were married in April 1950 after a long negotiation with the local police station. Within several months Hawkes' wife became pregnant and China entered the Korean War, and the couple was strongly advised to leave China. They departed China in 1951 and returned to Oxford, where Hawkes continued his graduate study in Chinese under the American sinologist Homer H. Dubs, Oxford's new chair of Chinese. He received a D.Phil. in 1955 with a dissertation entitled "The Problem of Date and Authorship of Ch'u Tz'u", a study of the 3rd century BC anthology Verses of Chu (楚辭; Chǔ Cí). Hawkes' work attracted the attention of the prominent translator Arthur Waley, whom Hawkes came to consider his mentor.

Hawkes succeeded Dubs as Oxford's chair of Chinese in 1959, and much of his tenure focused on altering the Chinese curriculum to include modern Chinese literature, which it had not previously covered. By the end of the 1950s, the curriculum covered not only the Chinese Classics, but also the premodern Four Great Novels and the short stories of Lu Xun. Hawkes' lectures were noted as being "scholarly but entertaining" to the point of being suggestive of his "early love of the theatre".

In the 1960s, Hawkes became increasingly interested in Cao Xueqin's 18th-century epic novel Dream of the Red Chamber (紅樓夢), and in 1970 he was approached by Penguin Books to do a non-scholarly translation for publication in the Penguin Classics series. Translating all 120 chapters of Dream of Red Chamber proved a huge task, and in 1971 Hawkes shocked much of the Sinological world by resigning the chair of Chinese to focus exclusively on his translation. He obtained a Research Fellowship at All Souls College in 1973, which provided him with financial support during his translation work, which took nearly 10 years. He translated the first 80 chapters of the novel, which were published in three volumes (1973, 1977, 1980) under the novel's original title Story of the Stone (石頭記; Shítou Jì). The remaining 40 chapters, which appeared after Cao's death and whose authenticity has long been debated, were later translated by Hawkes' son-in-law, the British sinologist John Minford.

=== Retirement ===
Hawkes formally retired from Chinese scholarship in 1984 and relocated with his wife to Wales, donating his 4,500-volume Chinese book collection to the National Library of Wales. He and his wife cultivated a large garden and raised goats, while Hawkes focused his personal studies on the history of religion and learning the Welsh language. His only subsequent Chinese publication was a small translation of a Yuan dynasty drama entitled Liu Yi and the Dragon Princess, published in 2003. Hawkes was a severe critic of organized religion in his later life, and in 2004 edited a series of his essays into a small volume entitled Letters from a Godless Grandfather, which was published privately in Hong Kong. He was a vocal critic of Israel's treatment of Palestinians and of British and American military involvement in the Middle East, and participated in several protest marches.

Hawkes died in Oxford on 31 July 2009, aged 86.

== Selected works ==
- Hawkes, David (1955). "The Problem of Date and Authorship of Ch'u Tz'u". D.Phil. dissertation (Oxford University).
- ——— (1959). Ch'u Tz'ǔ: the Songs of the South, an Ancient Chinese Anthology. Oxford: Clarendon Press. 2nd edition (1985).
- ——— (2016). A Little Primer of Tu Fu (revised ed.). New York: New York Review Books. ISBN 978-9629966591.
- ——— and John Minford, trans. (1973–86). The Story of the Stone: A Chinese Novel in Five Volumes. London, New York: Penguin Books.
- ——— The Story of the Stone: a Translator's Notebooks. Hong Kong: Lingnan University, 2000.
- ——— (1989). Classical, Modern and Humane: Essays in Chinese Literature. Hong Kong: Chinese University Press.
- ———, trans. (2003). Liu Yi and the Dragon Princess: A Thirteenth-Century Zaju Play by Shang Zhongxian. Hong Kong: Chinese University Press.
