= Ormosia hosiei =

Conservation status
- Near Threatened (IUCN 2.3)

Scientific classification
- Kingdom: Plantae
- Clade: Embryophytes
- Clade: Tracheophytes
- Clade: Spermatophytes
- Clade: Angiosperms
- Clade: Eudicots
- Clade: Rosids
- Order: Fabales
- Family: Fabaceae
- Subfamily: Faboideae
- Genus: Ormosia
- Species: O. hosiei

Binomial name
- Ormosia hosiei Hemsl. & E.H.Wilson

Synonyms
- Ormosia taiana C.Y.Chiao

Species of legume

Ormosia hosiei is a species of flowering plant in the family Fabaceae.

== Attributes ==
It is a large tree, up to 20–30 metres (66–98 ft) tall. It is only found in eastern and central China (in Anhui, Fujian, Gansu, Guizhou, Hubei, SE Jiangsu, Jiangxi, S Shaanxi, Sichuan, and Zhejiang provinces). It is becoming rare due to habitat loss and over-harvesting. The natural habitat of this species is in low-elevation broadleaved forest. It is under second-class national protection.

== Naming ==
This plant is named after Alexander Hosie, the British consul-general to China who amassed large botanical collections in China and subsequently sent to Kew Gardens, London.
