= Paths of Glory (Archer novel) =

2009 novel by Jeffrey Archer

- First edition (UK)
- Author: Jeffrey Archer
- Language: English
- Publisher: Macmillan (UK); St. Martin's Press (US)
- Publication date: 3 March 2009
- Publication place: United Kingdom
- Media type: Print (hardcover)
- Pages: 466
- ISBN: 978-0-312-53951-1
- OCLC: 243544580
- Dewey Decimal: 823/.914 22
- LC Class: PR6051.R285 P38 2009

Paths of Glory is a novel by English author Jeffrey Archer based on the story of George Mallory who died attempting to climb Everest in the 1920s. It was published by St. Martin's Press on 3 March 2009. It fictionally supports the claims that George Mallory, an Englishman, was the first to conquer Mount Everest – before Sir Edmund Hillary and Tenzing Norgay.

== Controversy ==
The novel caused a controversy in New Zealand, with major newspaper The Dominion Post calling it an insult to Sir Edmund Hillary, as the story portrays Mallory as successfully reaching the summit of Mount Everest.

== Characters ==
- George Mallory: Professor and climber
- Ruth Mallory: Thackeray Turner's daughter and George's wife
- Reverend Leigh Mallory: George's father
- Annie Mallory: George's mother
- Avie Mallory: George's sister
- Mary Mallory: George's sister
- Trafford Mallory: George's brother
- Guy Bullock: George's best friend
- Mr. Graham Irving: George's teacher
- A. C. Benson: George's teacher at Cambridge
- Geoffrey Winthrop Young: Chairman of the Alpine Club and George's climbing mentor
- George Finch: George's Australian rival at mountain climbing
- Andrew O'Sullivan: Teacher, George's colleague at Charterhouse
- Mr. Thackeray Turner: School governor at Charterhouse
- Marjorie and Mildred Turner: Mr Turner's daughters
- Sandy Irvine: George's final climbing partner
- Mr. Arthur Hinks: Secretary Everest committee
- Brigadier General Bruce: General posted in India
- Sir Edward Norton: Climber
- Howard Somervell: Climber
- Professor Noel Odell: Climber
- Captain John Noel: Climber
- Claire, Beridge and John Mallory: George's children.

== Film adaptation ==
In June 2021, it was announced that a film adaptation of Paths of Glory was in development for a production start in January 2022, with Ewan McGregor, Mark Strong, and Sam Heughan set to star as Mallory, Hinks, and Finch, respectively. Doug Liman will direct and produce the project, with Sheldon Turner writing the screenplay under the title Everest and HanWay Films handling international sales and distribution. Juno Temple joined the cast in September as Ruth Mallory.
