= Glen Dudbridge =

British Sinologist

FBA Glen Dudbridge
- Born: 1938; Bristol, England
- Died: 5 February 2017 (aged 78–79)

Academic work
- Discipline: Sinology
- Institutions: University of Oxford

Glen Dudbridge FBA (1938 – 5 February 2017) was a British Sinologist, specialising in the literature and religious culture of China, ranging between the eighth and seventeenth centuries AD, with particular attention to narrative traditions and to vernacular culture.

== Career ==
Dudbridge grew up in Westbury-on-Trym, Bristol, and attended Bristol Grammar School. He trained in Chinese at Cambridge (1967), and at New Asia Research Institute, Hong Kong (1963). He was University Lecturer in Modern Chinese, at the University of Oxford (1965-1985), then Professor of Chinese at Cambridge (1985-1989), then Shaw Professor of Chinese (1989-2005). He also taught Chinese literature at Yale University, UC Berkeley, Beijing Normal University, and the Chinese University of Hong Kong. He was an Honorary Academy Member of the Chinese Academy of Social Sciences (1996). He served as president of the European Association for Chinese Studies from 1998 to 2002. He was elected as a Fellow of the British Academy in 1984.

== Publications ==
- The tale of Li Wa: study and critical edition of a Chinese story from the ninth century. London, 1983.
- The Legend of Miao-shan. London, 1978; Chinese edition: Taipei, 1999; rev. edn.: Oxford, 1978.
- Religious experience and lay society in T'ang China: a reading of Tai Fu's 'Kuang-i chi', 1995.
- The Hsi-yu chi: a study of antecedents to the sixteenth-century Chinese novel, 1970.
- Books, tales and vernacular culture: papers on China by Glen Dudbridge, Leiden, 2005.
- A portrait of Five Dynasties China, from the memoirs of Wang Renyu (880-956), 2015.
