= List of listed buildings in Belhelvie =

This is a list of listed buildings in the parish of Belhelvie in Aberdeenshire, Scotland.

== List ==
Name	Location	Date listed	Grid ref. (Note: Sometimes known as OSGB36, the grid reference (where provided) is based on the British national grid reference system used by the Ordnance Survey. • "Guide to National Grid". Ordnance Survey. • "Get-a-map". Ordnance Survey.)	Geo-coordinates	Notes	LB number (Note: Historic Environment Scotland assign a unique alphanumeric identifier to each designated site in Scotland, for listed buildings this always begins with "LB", for example "LB12345".)	Image
Orrock House Gatepiers				57°16′01″N 2°03′42″W	Category B	2779	Upload Photo
Balmedie House (Eventide Home)				57°15′19″N 2°03′14″W	Category C(S)	2781	Upload Photo
Belhelvie Lodge				57°14′39″N 2°05′44″W	Category B	2783	Upload Photo
Old Parish Church Of Belhelvie (St. Columba)				57°16′03″N 2°03′10″W	Category B	2800	Upload Photo
Morthouse At S.W. Corner Churchyard				57°16′02″N 2°03′10″W	Category B	2776	Upload Photo
Belhelvie Churchyard				57°16′03″N 2°03′08″W	Category C(S)	2777	Upload Photo
Menie House				57°16′30″N 2°02′19″W	Category B	2787	Upload another image
Orrok (Or Orrock) House				57°16′00″N 2°03′41″W	Category A	2778	Upload Photo
Balmedie House, Lodge And Gatepiers				57°15′14″N 2°03′39″W	Category C(S)	2782	Upload Photo
Old Manse Of Shiels				57°15′55″N 2°06′16″W	Category B	2784	Upload Photo
Shiels House (New Manse Of Shiels)				57°16′01″N 2°06′04″W	Category C(S)	2785	Upload Photo
Orrock House Doocot, On Farm Of Mains Of Orrock, Near Former Mains Of Orrock Croft				57°15′53″N 2°04′06″W	Category B	2780	Upload Photo
Ardo House And Outbuildings				57°16′47″N 2°07′13″W	Category B	2786	Upload Photo
Morthouse North Of Church				57°16′02″N 2°03′10″W	Category B	2775	Upload Photo

== Key ==
The scheme for classifying buildings in Scotland is:

- Category A: "buildings of national or international importance, either architectural or historic; or fine, little-altered examples of some particular period, style or building type."
- Category B: "buildings of regional or more than local importance; or major examples of some particular period, style or building type, which may have been altered."
- Category C: "buildings of local importance; lesser examples of any period, style, or building type, as originally constructed or moderately altered; and simple traditional buildings which group well with other listed buildings."

In March 2016 there were 47,288 listed buildings in Scotland. Of these, 8% were Category A, and 50% were Category B, with the remaining 42% being Category C.

== See also ==
- List of listed buildings in Aberdeenshire
