= Shaw Professor of Chinese =

Permanent professorship at Oxford

The position of Shaw Professor of Chinese is one of the permanent professorships at the University of Oxford, England. It was established in 1876 as the Professor of Chinese, and is now associated with a professorial fellowship at University College, Oxford. The professor is part of the Faculty of Oriental Studies. The chair was renamed the Shaw Professorship in 1993 in recognition of the donation by Run Run Shaw of £3,000,000 to the university for developing Chinese studies, part of which was used to endow the chair.

The people to have held the professorship since its establishment are:

- James Legge 1876–97
- Thomas Lowndes Bullock 1899–1915
- William Edward Soothill 1920–35
- Homer Dubs 1947–59
- David Hawkes 1959–71
- Piet van der Loon 1972–87
- Glen Dudbridge 1989–2005
- Timothy Brook 2007–09
- Barend J. ter Haar 2013–18
- Tian Yuan Tan 2019–
