= David Lindsay (minister) =

Minister of the Church of Scotland

David Lindsay (also Lindsey; c. 1583 – 23 November 1667) was a minister serving in the Church of Scotland. He was the author of several theological tracts and sermons.

== Clerical career ==
Lindsay was educated at St Andrews University and graduated MA in 1607. He was appointed to the parish of Carmyllie in 1609 and moved shortly afterwards to Kinnettles in 1610. He moved to the parish of Belhelvie in 1617 where he remained until his death in 1667. An attempt to transport Lindsay to the parish of Dundee in 1638 was unsuccessful.

Lindsay signed the National Covenant in 1638 and was a member of the General Assemblies of 1638 and 1639 where episcopacy was abolished in the Church of Scotland. He was the chairman for the Committee of Bills, one of the key steering groups for the Assemblies, in 1638 and 1639. At this time, Robert Baillie, future principal of Glasgow University, described Lindsay as a 'stirring and a pragmatic bold man'.

Lindsay was made rector of King's College, Aberdeen, in 1651.

Despite his subscription of the National Covenant, Lindsay remained in post after the Restoration in 1660.

== Publications ==
Lindsay published several pieces, mainly devotional works, during his lifetime. These included:

- A Delorous Expression and An Eclogue on the Death of Bishop Forbes (1635)
- Scotland's Halleluiah (Aberdeen, 1642)
- The Converts Cordiall (1644)

== Personal life ==
Lindsay married Elizabeth Ochterlony at some point before December 1617. After her death, Lindsay married again, this time to Margaret Annand. He had three children: John, Elizabeth and Helen. Lindsay died on 23 November 1667.
