= Tian Yuan Tan =

Singaporean academic

- Born: 1971 or 1972 (age 54–55)

Academic background
- Education: National University of Singapore (BA, MA) Harvard University (PhD)
- Doctoral advisor: Wilt L. Idema

Academic work
- Institutions: University of Oxford

Chinese name
- Traditional Chinese: 陳靝沅
- Simplified Chinese: 陈靔沅
- Hanyu Pinyin: Chén Tiānyuán
- Hokkien POJ: Tân Thian-goán

Tian Yuan Tan (陳靝沅; born c. 1972) is a Singaporean scholar of Chinese literature. Since 2019, he has served as Shaw Professor of Chinese at the University of Oxford and a Professorial Fellow of University College. Prior to his appointment at Oxford, he was Professor of Chinese Studies at SOAS, University of London.

== Early life ==
Tan is from Singapore, where he did his secondary education at The Chinese High School (now part of the Hwa Chong Institution) and his bachelor's degree at the National University of Singapore. He obtained his PhD from Harvard University in 2006 under the supervision of Wilt L. Idema, Wai-yee Li, and Stephen Owen.

== Career ==
Tan's main areas of research include pre-modern Chinese literature, with a special focus on late imperial drama, fiction, and poetry; Chinese literary history and historiography; court theatre and performance; and cross-cultural contacts between China and the world. His 2011 Chinese-language publication A Critical Edition of Kang Hai's Songs with Notes, and Two Essays, the first critical edition of the complete sanqu songs of Kang Hai (1475–1541), was awarded second prize in both the 2011 National Excellent Classical Books Award (全國優秀古籍圖書獎) and Excellent Classical Books of East China Region Award (華東地區古籍優秀圖書獎).

He is an editorial board member of several academic journals and book series and served as Secretary-General of the European Association for Chinese Studies (EACS) from 2012 to 2018.

== Selected publications ==
=== Monographs ===
- Passion, Romance, and Qing: The World of Emotions and States of Mind in Peony Pavilion. 3 Volumes. Leiden: Brill, 2014. (Co-authored with Paolo Santangelo)
- Kang Hai sanqu ji jiaojian 康海散曲集校箋 (A Critical Edition of Kang Hai's Songs with Introduction, Notes, and Two Essays). Hangzhou: Zhejiang guji chubanshe, 2011. (Single-authored; PI of British Academy funded project, 2008-2010)
- Songs of Contentment and Transgression: Discharged Officials and Literati Communities in Sixteenth-Century North China. Cambridge, MA: Harvard University Asia Center, 2010. (Single-authored)

=== Edited books ===
- 1616: Shakespeare and Tang Xianzu's China. London: Bloomsbury Arden Shakespeare, 2016. (Lead Editor and PI of CCKF funded project (2014–15), with Paul Edmondson and Shih-pe Wang)
- Yingyu shijie de Tang Xianzu yanjiu lunzhu xuanyi 英語世界的湯顯祖研究論著選譯 (An Anthology of Critical Studies on Tang Xianzu in Western Scholarship). Hangzhou: Zhejiang guji chubanshe, 2013. (Co-editor, with Xu Yongming; funded by Harvard-Yenching Institute and PRC International Project Network Grant)
- Text, Performance, and Gender in Chinese Literature and Music: Essays in Honor of Wilt Idema. Leiden: Brill, 2009. xii, 468pp. (Co-editor, with Maghiel van Crevel and Michel Hockx)

=== Journal articles ===
- “Springtime Passion and Literary Tradition in Peony Pavilion”, International Communication of Chinese Culture, Volume 3, Issue 1 (2016): 57–65.
- “Emerging from Anonymity: The First Generation of Writers of Songs and Drama in Mid-Ming Nanjing,” T’oung Pao 96 (2010): 125–164.
- “The Transmission of Sanqu Songs, Writers’ Reputation, and Literati Network in the Mid Ming: Local and Translocal Considerations,” Ming Qing Studies (2010): 193-215.
- “A Collation and Annotation of Kang Hai’s Newly Discovered Song Collection Pandong yuefu houlu,” (Part 2) (in Chinese), with revisions by Sun Chongtao, Studies in Culture & Art (Wenhua yishu yanjiu), Volume 2, No. 5 (2009): 145–175.
- “A Collation and Annotation of Kang Hai’s Newly Discovered Song Collection Pandong yuefu houlu,” (Part 1) (in Chinese), with revisions by Sun Chongtao, Studies in Culture & Art (Wenhua yishu yanjiu), Volume 2, No.4 (2009): 117–134.
- “Contending with Displacement: Two Forms of Retirement in Wang Jiusi’s Songs and Drama,” (in Chinese), Journal of Theater Studies (Xiju yanjiu), 3 (2009): 49–74.
- “The Wolf of Zhongshan and Ingrates: Problematic Literary Contexts in Sixteenth-Century China,” Asia Major, Third Series, Volume 20, Part 1 (2007): 105–131.
- “The New Discovery of Kang Hai’s (1475-1541) Sanqu Collection and Its Significances,” (in Chinese), Zhongguo wenzhe yanjiu tongxun (Taipei: Academia Sinica), Volume 16, No.2 (2006): 75–91.
- “Prohibition of Jiatou Zaju in the Ming Dynasty and the Portrayal of the Emperor on Stage,” Ming Studies, Number 49 (Spring 2004): 82-111.

=== Book chapters ===
- “Song of Dragon Well Tea and Other Court Plays: Spectacle and Panegyrics”, in Patricia Sieber and Regina Llamas, eds. How to Read Chinese Drama. Columbia: Columbia University Press, under preparation.
- “Ming Qing gongting juben zhi bianzhuan ji zuozhe wenti chutan” 明清宮廷剧本之編撰及作者問題初探 (A Preliminary Study of the Compilation and Authorship of Drama in Ming and Qing Imperial Courts), in Ming Qing gongtingshi xueshu yantaohui lunwenji, Vol. 2 (2017). Beijing: Gugong chubanshe, pp 435–447.
- “Jiang Shiquan juzuo zhong de xi yu qu” 蔣士銓劇作中的“戲”與“曲” (Performance and Poetry in Jiang Shiquan's Dramatic Works), in Tsung-Cheng Lin and Zhang Bowei, eds., Cong chuantong dao xiandai de Zhongguo shixue 從傳統到現代的中國詩學 (From Tradition to Modernity: Poetic Transition from 18th to Early 20th Century China). Shanghai: Shanghai guji chubanshe, 2017, pp. 30–47.
- “Traditions and Transitions in Eighteenth-Century Qu Poetry: The Case of Jiang Shiquan (1725-1785)”, in Tiziana Lippiello, Chen Yuehong and Maddalena Barenghi, eds., Linking Ancient and Contemporary: Continuities and Discontinuities in Chinese Literature. Venice: Edizioni Ca'Foscari, 2016, pp. 229–245. (Sinica Venetiana series)
- “Introduction.,” in Tian Yuan Tan, Paul Edmondson, and Shih-pe Wang, eds., 1616: Shakespeare and Tang Xianzu's China. London: Bloomsbury Arden Shakespeare, pp. 1–4.
- “Sixty Plays from the Ming Palace, 1615-18”, in Tian Yuan Tan, Paul Edmondson, and Shih-pe Wang, eds., 1616: Shakespeare and Tang Xianzu's China. London: Bloomsbury Arden Shakespeare, 2016, pp. 96–107.
- “Shared Words and Worlds of Love in Peony Pavilion,” in Tian Yuan Tan and Paolo Santangelo, eds. Passion, Romance, and Qing: The World of Emotions and States of Mind in Peony Pavilion (3 vols.). Leiden, Boston: Brill, 2014, pp. 1454–1481.
- “Tang Xianzu and Shakespeare: Two Theatrical Cultures in Global Perspective,” (in English and Chinese) in Tang Xianzu-Shashibiya wenhua gaofeng luntan ji Tang Xianzu he Wan Ming wenhua xueshu yantaohui lunwen ji, ed. Society of Chinese Theatre Studies (Tang Xianzu Branch) and Suichang Association of Social Sciences. Hangzhou: Zhejiang University Press, 2012, 24–29.
- “Reflections on the Study of Court Theatre in Late Imperial China” (in Chinese), in Ming Qing gongtingshi xueshu yantaohui lunwenji (Volume 1), ed. Palace Museum. Beijing: Jijincheng chubanshe, 2011, pp. 467–477.
- “Rethinking Li Kaixian’s Editorship of Revised Plays by Yuan Masters: A Comparison with His Banter about Lyrics,” in Text, Performance, and Gender in Chinese Literature and Music: Essays in Honor of Wilt Idema, ed. Maghiel van Crevel, Tian Yuan Tan, and Michel Hockx. Leiden: Brill, 2009, pp. 139–152.
- “A Study of Kang Hai’s Composition of Southern Songs in His Later Years, Along with a Discussion on the Tune Title Langtaosha,” (in Chinese) Mingdai wenxue lunji, ed. Chen Qingyuan. Fuzhou: Haixia wenyi chubanshe, 2009, pp. 1065–1076.
- “The Sovereign and the Theater: Reconsidering the Impact of Ming Taizu’s Prohibitions,” Chapter 9 in Long Live the Emperor: Uses of the Ming Founder across Six Centuries of East Asian History, ed. Sarah Schneewind. Ming Studies Research Series, Number 4. Minneapolis: Society for Ming Studies, 2008, pp. 149–169.
- “The Discovery of Materials Related to the Mid Ming Writer Kang Hai and Its Significances,” (in Chinese) in Zhongguo Xiju: Cong Chuantong dao Xiandai (Chinese Drama: From Traditional to Modern Forms), ed. Dong Jian and Rong Guangrun. Beijing: Zhonghua shuju, 2006, pp. 179–196.
- “A Study of a ‘New’ Huaben Story in Jingshi tongyan: ‘Ye Fashi Fushi Zhenyao’ (Exorcist Ye Subdues the Demon with a Charmed Rock),” (in Chinese) in Mingdai xiaoshuo mianmianguan: Mingdai xiaoshuo guoji xueshu yantaohui lunwenji (Aspects of Ming Dynasty Fiction: Proceedings of the International Conference on Ming Fiction), ed. Kow Mei Kao and Huang Lin. Shanghai: Xuelin chubanshe, 2002, pp.354-371.

== Recent research projects ==
- ERC-funded project “TEXTCOURT: Linking the Textual Worlds of Chinese Court Theater, ca. 1600-1800”, Principal Investigator
- CCKF-funded project “Textual Forms and the Construction of Knowledge in Late Ming Qu Anthologies”, Co-Director (in collaboration with National Taiwan University)
- CCKF-funded project “Brave New Theatres: 1616 in China and England”
- British Academy-funded project “'Lost Songs' of Kang Hai (1475-1541)”
