= Dorothea Hosie =

British writer

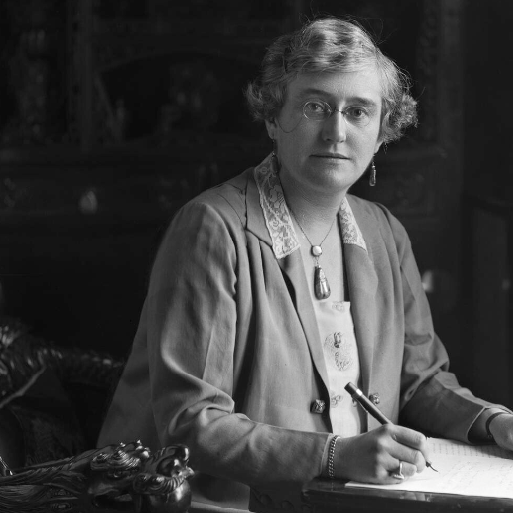
- Born: Dorothea Soothill; 1885; Ningbo
- Died: 15 February 1959 (aged 73–74); Salisbury
- Occupation: writer
- Writing career
- Subject: China

Dorothea Hosie née Dorothea Soothill, also known as Dorothea, Lady Hosie (1885 – 15 February 1959) was a British amateur film maker and writer on China. She assisted her father and her husband, Alexander Hosie, with their writing but when they died she published books on her own account. During the Second World War she was vice-principal of an evacuated private school in Somerset.

== Life ==
Hosie was born in Ningbo in China in 1885. Her parents were Lucy and William Edward Soothill; her father was a Methodist missionary. Her parents wanted to call her Dorothy but the British diplomat who registered her birth decided that Dorothea was much better. She was educated in Cambridge at Newnham College.

She married Sir Alexander Hosie (1853–1925), more than thirty years her senior, in 1913. He had served as the British consul on Pagoda Island, near Fuzhou in China, and was a respected plant collector in western China, Tibet and Taiwan. The genus Hosiea was named in his honour. He was also the author of Three Years in Western China (1890) and On the Trail of Opium Poppy (2 vols., 1914).

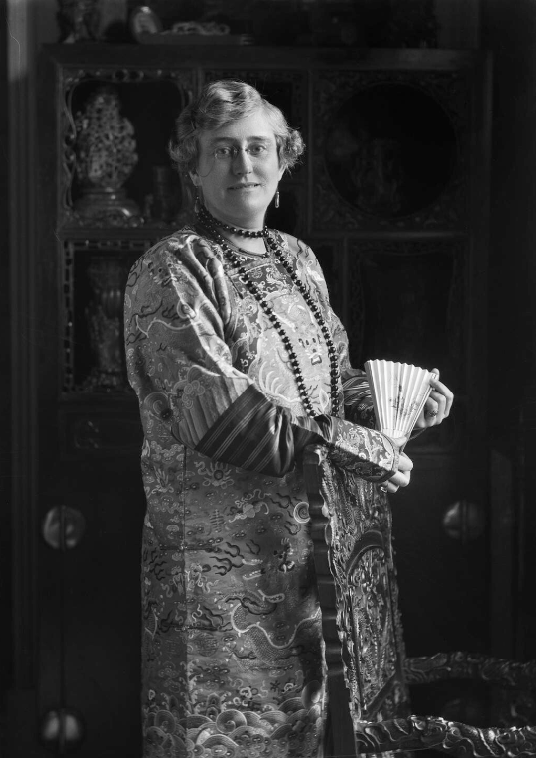
by Lafayette

Her husband died at Sandown, on 10 March 1925. She had assisted him in his writing and before that she had helped her father. In the year before her husband died she published Two Gentlemen of China and she wrote more on her own account. Portrait of a Chinese Lady followed in 1929. In 1930 she met Miss Gladys Muriel Starkey who worked at Brampton Down School, Kent. This would be a long friendship.

In 1936 she began researching for a book that in 1938 would be called Brave New China. During this research she created an hour-long amateur film that is now held by the British Film Institute. The film starts at the newly constructed Sun Yat-sen Memorial Hall in Guangzhou and then continues to record film up the east coast of China.

She edited her father William Edward Soothill's translation of the Analects of Confucius which was published by Oxford University Press in 1937.

In 1938 she became the vice-principal of Brampton Down Girls' School. The school was evacuated to Henlade House at Ruishton in Somerset. She was there during the whole of the war and left in 1946. While there she wrote The Pool of Ch’ien Lung which was about her time in China in 1936.

Her work Jesus and Woman was published in 1946 and it was abridged and retitled as The Master Calleth for Thee and published in America. It sold over 130,000 copies and was republished in Britain under its original title. The book looks through all four gospels and discusses the role of women with Christianity.

She retired at the end of the 1946 academic year, along with Miss Starkey. Together, they moved to Wiltshire and lived at Appletree Cottage, Redlynch, about eight miles from Salisbury, where they attended to an orchard. The house can still be found today, within the New Forest National Park.

Hosie died at Salisbury hospital on 15 February 1959. She was buried with her husband on the Isle of Wight.

After Hosie's death, Gladys remained at Appletree Cottage until her own death in 1965.

== Works ==
- Two Gentlemen of China, 1924, 5th edn 1929.
- Portrait of a Chinese Lady, 1929 and 1938 edn.
- Brave New China, 1938/1940.
- The Pool of Ch’ien Lung, 1944.
- Jesus and Woman, 1946, (American edn, 1954, as The Master Calleth for Thee and in Britain as Jesus and Woman, 1956).
