= Hosiea =

Scientific classification
- Kingdom: Plantae
- Clade: Embryophytes
- Clade: Tracheophytes
- Clade: Angiosperms
- Clade: Eudicots
- Clade: Asterids
- Order: Icacinales
- Family: Icacinaceae
- Genus: Hosiea; Hemsl. & E.H.Wilson

Genus of flowering plants

Hosiea is a genus of flowering plants belonging to the family Icacinaceae.

It is native to southern China and Japan.

The genus name of Hosiea is in honour of Alexander Hosie (1853–1925), a British diplomat and plant collector in China, and it was first described and published in Bull. Misc. Inform. Kew 1906 on page 154 in 1906.

Known species, according to Kew:

- Hosiea japonica Makino
- Hosiea sinensis (Oliv.) Hemsl. & E. H. Wilson
