= Steve Murdoch =

Scottish academic and writer

Steve Murdoch, MA (joint Hons), PhD, FRHistS, FSA (Scot) is an academic and writer. He is author on the history of Scotland and the Wider World in general and of Scotland and Scandinavia in particular. His monographs include Britain, Denmark-Norway and the House of Stuart, 1603-1660 (2000/2003); Network North: Scottish Kin, Commercial and Covert Associations in Northern Europe, 1603-1746 (2006) and the book The Terror of the Seas? Scottish Maritime Warfare, 1513-1713 (2010). In 2014 he published the co-authored book (with Alexia Grosjean) Alexander Leslie and the Scottish Generals of the Thirty Years' War, 1618-1648. He has edited several volumes including Scotland and the Thirty Years' War, 1618-1648 (2000) and with Alexia Grosjean Scottish Communities Abroad in the Early Modern Period (2005). This same pairing created the Scotland, Scandinavia and Northern European Biographical Database (SSNE). This database was created in 1995 and has been online and open access ever since.

Murdoch's first job after gaining his PhD from the University of Aberdeen in 1998 was as a research associate at The Roehampton Institute (based in Scandinavia as a researcher for Professor Peter Edwards in 1999). He thereafter gained a four-year AHRC funded post-doctoral fellowship at the University of Aberdeen (2000-2003) in which also had responsibility for another post-dotoral scholar. Upon leaving this role on 31 December 2003, Murdoch was awarded a lectureship at the University of St Andrews (School of History) in January 2004. After only two years in post he was promoted Reader in 2006 and, four years later, full-Professor in 2010. Murdoch was nominated for, and won, the Olof Palme Professorship in Peace Studies by Vetenskapsrådet (The Swedish Research Council) for the academic year 2013–2014.

In 2018, Murdoch was awarded an honorary five year Visiting Professorship at the UHI Institute for Northern Studies for services to the institute. This was extended in 2023 for a further five years.

Murdoch left the University of St Andrews in September 2021 after 17 years of service to that University, and as part of the teaching staff that saw the university gain top spot in the UK University rankings for the first time.

In April 2022 Murdoch began working at The Swedish Defence University (Försvarshögskolan) as a lecturer. His promotion to Professor of Military History was confirmed the following month on 1 May. In January 2023, Murdoch became head of the Military History Department (MHA), then a part of War Studies (IKVM). From January 2024, a new Institute of Military History and Centre for Languages (IMH) was created after both History and Languages left War Studies. Murdoch was selected to serve as Prefekt (Chair) for this new Institution, remaining as Chair of History for a three year cycle (January 2023 - December 2025). Since January 2026, Murdoch remains one of three employed Professors of History within IMH.

== Main publications ==
- The Business of War in the Early Modern Baltic Sea Region 1530–1765 edited by Steve Murdoch, Sebastian Schiavone, Anu Lahtinen and Jaakko Björklund (2026)
- Connected Oceans: A Festschrift to Leos Muller, edited by Lisa Hellman, Hanna Hodac, Aryo Makko and Steve Murdoch (2022)
- Unimpeded Sailing: A Critical Edition of Johan Grönings Navigatio libera (Extended 1698 Edition) (2019) with Peter Maxwell-Stuart (translator) and Leos Müller (co-editor)
- Alexander Leslie and the Scottish Generals of the Thirty Years' War, 1618-1648 (2014) with Alexia Grosjean
- The Terror of the Seas? Scottish Maritime Warfare, 1513-1713 (2010)
- The Navigator. The Log of John Anderson, VOC Pilot-Major, 1640-1643 (2010) with co-editors Victor Enthoven and Eila Williamson
- Network North: Scottish Kin, Commercial and Covert Associations in Northern Europe, 1603-1746 (2006)
- Scottish Communities Abroad in the Early Modern Period (2005) with Alexia Grosjean
- Steve Murdoch and A. Mackillop (eds.), Military Governors and Imperial Frontiers c.1600-1800 (2003).
- Steve Murdoch and A. Mackillop (eds.), Fighting for Identity: Scottish Military Experiences, 1550-1900 (2002).
- Scotland and the Thirty Years' War, 1618-1648 (2001)
- Britain, Denmark-Norway and the House of Stuart, 1603-1660 (2000)
- Belhelvie: A Millennium of History (2000) with Alexia Grosjean

== Online Dataset ==
- Steve Murdoch and Alexia Grosjean, Scotland, Scandinavia and Northern Europe, 1580-1707 (SSNE Biographical Database).

== Refereed Journal Articles ==
- and Alexia Grosjean, 'Sixteenth-Century Swedish 'Sea Laws': Three maritime codes translated' in The Mariner's Mirror, 112:2 (November 2026), pp. 220-232
- and Alexia Grosjean, ‘Tracing the Settlement of Scottish Immigrants in Early Modern Stockholm' in Northern Studies 55 (December 2024), pp.101-130.
- 'The Words of Command Practised in the Regiment: The Military Instructions of Colonel Sir Johan Skytte of Duderhof, 1634–1636' in Militärhistorisk Tidskrift (December 2024), pp. 30-44.
- and Kathrin Zickermann, ‘The Battle of Lemgo, 17 October 1638: An Empirical Re-evaluation' in Militärhistorisk Tidskrift (2023)
- and Karin Tetteris, ‘The 1628 Stralsund Gold Medal: It’s re-discovery and an ensuing riddle in material culture emanating from of the Thirty Years’ War’ in Militärhistorisk Tidskrift 2022)
- ‘Mary Haynes and Frances Drummond: Two Abandoned Wives of Scottish Soldiers during the Thirty Years’ War (1618-1648)’ in Northern Studies 53 (December 2022)
- ‘Breaching Neutrality’: English Prize-taking and Swedish Neutrality in the first Anglo-Dutch War (1652-1654)' in Mariners’ Mirror 105:2 (May 2019), pp.132-145.
- and Kathrin Zickermann, ‘Bereft of all Human Help?’: Scottish Widows during the Thirty Years’ War (1618-1648)' in Northern Studies, 50 (2019), pp.114-134.
- ‘'Medic!’ An Insight into Scottish Field Surgeons, Physicians and Medical Provision during the Thirty Years’ War, 1618-1648' in Northern Studies, 48 (2017), pp.51-65.
- and Alexia Grosjean and Siobhan Talbott, ‘Drummer Major James Spens: Letters from a Common Soldier Abroad, 1617-1632’ in Northern Studies, 47 (2015), pp.76-101.
- and Alexia Grosjean, ‘Scottish involvement in the Swedish Riksdag of the seventeenth century: the period from Parliamentarianism to Absolutism, c.1632-1700’ in Parliaments, Estates and Representation, 34: 1 (2014), pp.1-21.
- ‘The Scots in Early Modern Scandinavia: A 21st Century Review: The Eighth Hermann Palsson Lecture 2012’ in Northern Studies 45 (2013), pp.27-45.
- and Kathrin Zickermann and Adam Marks, ‘The Battle of Wittstock 1636: Conflicting Reports on a Swedish Victory in Germany’ in Northern Studies, 43 (2012), pp.71-109 (Contribution 70%).
- ‘The Pearl Fisher: Robert Buchan ‘de Portlethin’ in Sweden, 1642-1653’ in Northern Studies (2007), pp.51-70.
- Scotland, Europe and the English Missing Link’, in History Compass, 5/3 (2007) pp.890-913.
- and Angelo Forte and E. Furgol ‘The Burgh of Stade and the Maryland "Court of Admiralty" of 1672’ in Forum Navale, The Naval Journal of the Swedish Military Archives, No. 60. (Summer, 2004), pp.94-111. uptaded and publishe by the Maryland archives online at: http://mdhistory.net/burgh_of_stade/html/index.html
- ‘John Brown: A Black Female Soldier in the Royal African Company’ in World History Connected: The Online Journal of World History, vol.2 (2004 and 2024). This article was selected for re-publication 20 years after it first appeared in print. In the later edition it was accompanied by commentary and positive editorial review
- and Angelo Forte, A. Little, ‘Scottish Privateers, Swedish Neutrality and the Third Anglo-Dutch War’ in Forum Navale, The Naval Journal of the Swedish Military Archives, No.59, (Summer, 2003), pp.37-65.
- ‘The Good the Bad and the Anonymous: A Preliminary Survey of the Scots in the Dutch East Indies 1612-1707’ in Northern Scotland, vol.22 (2002).
- ‘Cape Breton, Canada’s ‘Highland’ Island?’ in Northern Scotland, vol., 18 (1998), pp.63-76.
- ‘The Database in Early Modern Scottish History: Scandinavia and Northern Europe, 1580-1707’ in Northern Studies, vol. 32, (1997), pp.83-103.
- ‘Soldiers, Sailors, Jacobite Spy: The Scottish Jacobites in Russia 1688-1750.’ Slavonica, Spring (1997), pp.7-27. Hume-Brown Junior Prize 1995 - National Historical Essay Competition Winner.
- ‘More than just “Mackay’s” and mercenaries: Gaelic influences in Scandinavia, 1580-1707’ in Transactions of the Gaelic Society of Inverness, (1997), pp.161-185.

== Refereed Chapters ==
- ‘What is Military History and what is its Utility for the Military Profession?’ in Anne Marie Hagen and Kjetil Enstad (eds), Advancing Military Professional Practice through Military Humanities (Taylor and Francis, London, 2026).
- and Alexia Grosjean, ‘Social Capital v The Fiscal Military State: The logistics and supply of the Covenanting Army, 1633-1641’ in Jaakko Björklund, Anu Lahtinen, Steve Murdoch and Sebastian Schiavone (eds) The Business of War in the Early Modern Baltic Sea Region 1530–1765 (Helsinki University Press, 2026)
- ‘Crown Policies, Church Decrees and Civic Necessity: Non-Lutheran Migration to Scandinavia in the Early Modern Period’ in Pete Edwards (ed.), Monarchy, the Court, and the Provincial Elite in Early Modern Europe (Brill Academic Publishers, March 2024).
- ´Stolbova in Perspective: Jacobean Diplomacy in the Baltic Region, 1589-1618’ in Arne Jönsson and Arsenii Vetushko-Kalevich (eds) The Peace of Stolbovo 1617 between Sweden and Russia. Aspects and Perspectives (Brepols Publishers, 2023)
- ‘War and Peace: Scottish-Norwegian Relations in the Early Modern Period (c.1520-1707)' in Andrew Simpson and Jorn Øyrehagen Sunde (eds) Comparative Perspectives in Scottish and Norwegian Legal History, Trade and Seafaring: 1200-1800 (Edinburgh University Press, 2023)
- ‘Bohemian Exiles in the Transoceanic World: An unexpected consequence of the Thirty Years’ War’ in Lisa Hellman, Hanna Hodac, Aryo Makko and Steve Murdoch (eds), Connected Oceans: A Festschrift to Leos Muller (Universus Press, Lund, 2022)
- ‘The Auld Alliance and French Intervention in the Thirty Years’ War, 1633-1648’ in Neil McIntyre and Alison Cathcart (eds), Scotland and the Wider World, c.1525-1880 (Boydell & Brewer, March 2022).
- ‘Nicrina ad Heroas Anglos. An overview of the British and the Thirty Years’ War' in Serena Jones (ed.), Britain Turned Germany: The Thirty Years' War and its Impact on the British Isles 1638-1660 (Helion, Warwick, 2020 edition)
- ‘Scottish Calvinists and Swedish Diplomacy: The case of Sir James Spens of Wormiston’ in Roberta Anderson and Charlotte Backerra (eds), Confessional Diplomacy in Early Modern Europe (Routledge Studies in Renaissance and Early Modern Worlds of Knowledge, London, 2020)
- ‘Neutrality at Sea: Scandinavian responses to ‘Great Power’ Maritime Warfare, 1651-1713’ in J. David Davies, Alan James and Gijs Rommelse (eds.), Ideologies of Western Naval Power, c. 1500-1815 (Routledge: Politics and Culture in Europe Series, London, 2019)
- ’Marital Problems? Stuart Alliances, Scottish Politics and the Protestant North, 1603-1641' in S. Wolfson and V. Caldari (eds.) Stuart Marriage Diplomacy: Dynastic Politics in their European Context, 1604-1630 (Martlesham, 2018), pp. 157-171.
- and L. Müller, ’Neutral före neutraliteten: svensk sjöfart i krigens skugga, cirka 1650–1800’ in Angöringar - berättelser och kunskap från havet: En antologi med artiklar av forskare knutna till Centrum för maritima studier och Statens maritima museer edited by L. Müller, & S. Ekström, (Makadam förlag, Stockholm, 2017), pp.189-210.
- ‘The Repatriation of Capital to Scotland: A Case Study of Dutch Testaments and Miscellaneous Notarial Instruments’ in M. Varricchio (ed.) Back to Caledonia (Birlinn, Edinburgh, 2012), pp.38-57.
- and Esther Mijers, ‘Migrant Destinations, 1500-1700’ in T.M. Devine and J. Wormald (eds.), Oxford Handbook of Scottish History (Oxford, 2012), pp.320-327 – Contribution 50%
- ‘Oxenstierna’s Spies: Sir James Spens and the organisation of Covert Operations in early Seventeenth-century Sweden’ in Daniel Szechi (ed.), The Dangerous Trade: Spies, Spymasters and the Making of Europe (Dundee University Press, 2010), pp.45-65.
- ‘The April Committee 1640: The Projection and Reflection of the Covenanting Revolution’ in Morag Monro-Landi (ed.) l'Écosse et ses doubles, ancien monde, nouveau monde (l’Harmattan, Paris, 2010), pp.42-67
- ‘Community, Commodity and Commerce: The Stockholm-Scots in the Seventeenth Century’ in David Worthington, (ed.), British and Irish Emigrants and Exiles in Europe, 1603-1688 (Leiden, Northern World Series, 2010), pp.31-66.
- ‘Tilting at Windmills: The Order del Toboso as a Jacobite Social Network’ in Paul K. Monod, Murray Pittock and Daniel Szechi, (eds.), Loyalty and Identity: Jacobites at Home and Abroad (Basingstoke, 2010), pp.243-264.
- ‘The Northern Flight: Irish Soldiers in Seventeenth-century Scandinavia’ in T. O’Connor and M.A. Lyons (ed.), The Ulster Earls and Baroque Europe: Refashioning Irish Identities, 1600-1800 (Dublin, 2010), pp.88-109.
- ‘Scotland and Europe’ in R. Harris and A.R. MacDonald (eds.), Scotland: The Making and Unmaking of the Nation, c.1100-1707. Volume 2: Early Modern Scotland c.1500-1707 (Dundee, 2007), pp.126-144.
- and P. Dukes, A. Grosjean and D. Worthington, ‘Leslies in Central and Northern Europe during and after the Thirty Years’ War’ in I. Bartček and Z. Samberger (eds) Ad Honorem Joseph Polišenský (Prague, 2007), pp.349-369. Contribution 25%
- ‘The French Connection: Bordeaux’s ‘Scottish’ Networks in Context, c.1670-1720’ in G. Leydier (ed.), Scotland and Europe, Scotland in Europe (Cambridge Scholars Publishing, 2007) pp.26-55.
- ‘Irish Entrepreneurs and Sweden in the first half of the eighteenth century’ in T. O’Connor and M.A. Lyons (eds.), Irish Communities in Early-Modern Europe (Dublin, 2006), pp.348-366.
- and Alexia Grosjean, ‘The Scottish Community in Seventeenth-Century Gothenburg’ in A. Grosjean and S. Murdoch (eds.), Scottish Communities Abroad in the Early Modern Period (Leiden, 2005), pp.191-223. Contribution 50%
- ‘Children of the Diaspora: The ‘homecoming’ of the second-generation Scot in the 17th century’ in M. Harper (ed.) Emigrant Homecomings: The Return Movement of Emigrants, 1600-2000 (Manchester, 2004), pp.55-76.
- ‘The Scots and Ulster: Some Scandinavian Dimensions’ in J.R. Young and W. Kelly (eds.), Ulster and Scotland 1600-2000: History, Language and Identity (Dublin, 2004), pp.85-104.
- ‘Scotsmen on the Danish-Norwegian Frontier, 1589-1680’ in S. Murdoch and A. Mackillop (eds.), Military Governors and Imperial Frontiers c.1600-1800 (Leiden, Brill History of Warfare Series, 2003), pp.1-28.
- ‘Kith and Kin: John Durie and the Scottish Network in Scandinavia and the Baltic, 1624-1634’ in P. Salmon and T. Barrow (eds.) Britain and the Baltic (Sunderland, 2003), pp.21-45.
- ‘Scotland, Scandinavia and the Bishops’ Wars, 1638-1640’ in A.I. Macinnes and J. Ohlmeyer (eds.), The Stuart Kingdoms in the Seventeenth Century: Awkward Neighbours (Dublin, 2002), pp.113-134.
- ‘James VI and the formation of a British Military Identity’ in S. Murdoch and A. Mackillop (eds.), Fighting for Identity: Scottish Military Experiences, 1550-1900 (Leiden, Brill History of Warfare Series, 2002), pp.3-31.
- ‘Scottish Ambassadors and British Diplomacy’ in S. Murdoch (ed.), Scotland and the Thirty Years’ War 1618-1648 (Leiden, Brill History of Warfare Series, 2001), pp.27-50.
- ‘Diplomacy in Transition; Stuart-British Diplomacy in Northern Europe, 1603-1618’ in A.I. Macinnes, T. Riis and F.G. Pedersen (eds.), Ships, Guns and Bibles in the North Sea and Baltic States (East Linton, 2000), pp.93-138.
- ‘The Search for Northern Allies: Stuart and Cromwellian Propaganda and Propagandists in Scandinavia, 1649-1660’ in B. Taithe and T. Thornton (eds.), Propaganda (Gloucestershire, 1999), pp.79-96.
- ‘The House of Stuart and the Scottish Professional Soldier 1618 -1638; a conflict of nationality and identities’ in B. Taithe and T. Thornton (eds.), War: Identities in Conflict 1300-2000 (Gloucestershire, 1998), pp.37-56.

== Other Journal Articles ==
- ‘Papering over Division: Visualising Britishness’ in British Art Studies, 29 (2025, online journal).
- and A. Grosjean, ‘El ejército sueco, 1628-1632’ in Desperta Ferro. Revista de Historia Militar Y Politica, vol.27 (2017), pp.30-36
- ‘Des réseaux de conspiration dans le Nord? Une étude de la franc-maçonnerie jacobite et hanovrienne en Scandinavie et en Russie, 1688-1746’ in Politica Hermetica, 24 (Sorbonne, 2010), pp.29-56.
- ‘Surfing the Waves: Scottish Admirals in Russia in their Baltic Context’ in Journal of Irish and Scottish Studies, 3, 2 (2010), pp.59-86.
- ‘Anglo-Scottish Culture Clash: Scottish Identities and Britishness, c.1520-1750’ in CYCNOS vol. 25:2 (2008), pp.245-266.
- ‘Fabricating Nobility? Genealogy and Social Mobility among Franco-Scottish families in the Early Modern Period’ in Ranam: Recherches Anglaises et Américaines (2007) pp.37-52.
- and J.R. Young, ‘Union and Identity: Scotland in a Social and Institutional Context’ in Angles of the English-Speaking World (Copenhagen, 2007), pp.35-58.
- ‘The Scottish Community in Kedainiai (Kiejdany) in its Scandinavian and Baltic Context’ in Almanach Historyczny (Kielce, Poland, 2007), pp.47-61.
- and A. Grosjean, ‘Irish Participation in Scandinavian Armies during the Thirty Years’ War’ in The Irish Sword, The Journal of the Military History Society of Ireland, Vol. XXIV, no.97 (Summer 2005), pp.277-289. Contribution 50%
- and Alexia Grosjean, ‘A Note on Irish Soldiers in Swedish Service, 1609-1613’ in The Irish Sword, The Journal of the Military History Society of Ireland, Vol. XXIV, no.96 (Winter 2004), pp.161-163. Contribution 50%

== Popular Articles, Public Dissemination and Misc ==
- “Foreword” to Gunnar Wetterberg, Axel Oxenstierna: The Mastermind behind Sweden’s Victory in the Thirty Years’ War (Stolpe, October 2025).
- and Kathrin Zickermann, ‘Providing for widows and orphans is pleasing to Almighty God’: Scottish Widows and the Thirty Years’ War' in History Scotland June 2020.
- ‘“It started off in Fife, it ended up in Tears”: Scotland and the Thirty Years’ War’ in, History Scotland May 2019
- ‘Britain and the Thirty Years War’ in Modern History Review vol.21:2 (2018)
- (translated by Sabine Eickhoff), 'Schottland – glaube und identität', in 1636 – Ihre Letzte Schlacht: Leben im Dreißigjährigen Krieg (1636 Battle of Wittstock Exhibition, Berlin, 2012), p.29.
- (translated by Sabine Eickhoff), 'Schweden – auf dem weg zur großmacht (Sweden - on the road being a great power)' in 1636 – Ihre Letzte Schlacht: Leben im Dreißigjährigen Krieg (1636 Battle of Wittstock Exhibition, Berlin, 2012), pp.30-31.
- (translated by Sabine Eickhoff), 'Sonderfall Schottland – „ein starkes, dauerhafftigs volk“, in 1636 – Ihre Letzte Schlacht: Leben im Dreißigjährigen Krieg (1636 Battle of Wittstock Exhibition, Berlin, 2012), pp.45-47.
- (translated by Sabine Eickhoff), 'Historische Forschungen zu Schottischen Söldnern' in 1636 – Ihre Letzte Schlacht: Leben im Dreißigjährigen Krieg (1636 Battle of Wittstock Exhibition, Berlin, 2012), pp.48-53
- - Seventeenth Century Scandinavia: The Evidence in the State Papers’ in State Papers Online, 1509-1714 - http://gale.cengage.co.uk/state-papers-online-15091714/essays.aspx
- ‘Sailing the Scottish Seas’ in Norman H. Reid (ed.), Treasures of St Andrews University Library (St Andrews, 2010)
- and K. Zickermann, ‘Major General Patrick Moore of Buxtehude: A Scottish Officer in Swedish Bremen’ in Friends of Perth and Kinross Council Archive, Issue 21 (2007), pp.8-10.
- ‘Scotland in Sweden: A Historical Background’ in Agenda: The Magazine of the British Council in Sweden. Special Issue ‘Scotland in Sweden’ (2003), pp.25-26.
- ‘Newcastle in Pawn’ in Northern Review, vol. 9 & 10 (2001), pp.18-24
- ‘Soldiers of Fortune’ in Scotland’s Story, no.25. (2001), pp.14-17.
- ‘Scotsmen in Batavia in the 17th Century’ in Grapevine: British Women’s Association, Jakarta, (April 2000), pp.17-19.
- ‘If Only…. James King’s Career in Scandinavia’ in Orkney Review, no.85. (1999), pp.33-35.
- ‘Simon Stewart: Privateer, Admiral and Orcadian’ in Orkney Review, no.82. (1999), pp.20-22.
- ‘Northern Exposure: Irishmen in Scandinavia in the seventeenth century’ in History Ireland (Autumn, 1998), pp.5-6.
- ‘Sealladh ur air An t–Suain’ [A New Look at Sweden] in Gairm: An Raitheachan Gaidhlig, 171 (1995), pp.265-267.
- ‘Church Lodge and Sports Club: The formation of Irish Identity in Scotland’ in Causeway (Autumn, 1995), pp.19-24.
- ‘Nationalism – Cause or Consequence of Conflict?’ in A.U. Spectrum Magazine (1994), pp.4-6

== Encyclopaedia Articles ==
- ‘Schottische Soldaten in Europa in der Frühen Neuzeit’ in K.J Bade, P.C. Emmer, Leo Lucassen and J. Oltmer (eds) in Enzyklopädie Migration in Europa vom 17. Jahrhundert bis zur Gegenwart (München, 2007), pp.948-952.
- ‘Mercenaries in Europe’ in M. Lynch, (ed.), The Oxford Companion to Scottish History (Oxford, 2001), pp.418-419.
- ‘Scandinavia since 1600’ in M. Lynch, (ed.), The Oxford Companion to Scottish History (Oxford, 2001), pp.560-561.

== Edited Texts ==
- ‘A Scottish Letter of Marque from the Thirty Years’ War: A legal first for the doctrine of continuous voyage’ Naval Records Society Online Magazine (2019)
- and Alexia Grosjean ‘The Riksråd Debates, 1638-1640’. Documents 117 & 118 in C. Erskine, A.R. MacDonald and M. Penman (eds.), Scotland: The Making and Unmaking of the Nation, c.1100-1707. Volume 5: Major Documents (Dundee, 2007), pp.214-223. Contribution 50%
- and Alexia Grosjean, ‘Royal Supplications to the Swedish Boards of Trades and Mines on behalf of Denis O’Brien (1723-16) and John O’Kelly (1725-28)’ in Archivium Hibernicum, LX (2006-2007), pp.436-459. Contribution 50%

== Biographical Articles ==
Oxford Dictionary of National Biography (2004), articles by S. Murdoch. Available online at: www.oxforddnb.com

- Sir Robert Anstruther (Diplomat)
- James Forbes (Merchant and Soldier)
- Sir John Henderson (Soldier and Diplomat) written with David Worthington
- Sir William Keith (5th Earl Marischal) revision of T.F. Henderson article
- Sir James King, Lord Eythin (Soldier and Diplomat) written with Tim Wales
- General Thomas Meldrum (Soldier)
- Sir Robert Scott (General and Inventor)
- Sir Andrew Sinclair (Soldier, Governor and Diplomat)
- Sir Andrew Stewart (Soldier and Diplomat)
- Margaret Forratt (Noblewoman, estate owner and correspondent) – co-written with Kathrin Zickermann
- Martha Stuart (Land-owner, farmer and war widow) – co-written with Kathrin Zickermann

== Socio Linguistics ==
- and David Horsburgh, 'Kennin yer Earse fae yer Alba': the Scottish Office, the Gaelic lobby and the Scots language, a discussion document (Aberdeen, 1998)
- and David Horsburgh, "Daena haud yer wheisht, haud yer ain!": Transcriptions of the General Register Office (Scotland) Cognitive Research Programme concerning the Scots Language (Aberdeen, 1996)
- Language Politics in Scotland (Aberdeen, 1995 & 2nd edition 1996). This MA dissertation went on to influence the General Registers Office (Scotland) into conducting their own research which led to the Scots language being included on the UK Census.
