= John Soothill =

British physician (1925–2004)

John Farrar Soothill (20 August 1925 – 23 September 2004) was an English medical doctor. He began his career as a nephrologist and later became a paediatric immunologist at Great Ormond Street Hospital.

== Biography ==
John Soothill was born in 1925 in Blackheath, London. His father was the chief medical officer in Norwich and his grandfather, William Edward Soothill, had been the first professor of sinology at Oxford University. He attended The Leys School, Cambridge, and in spite of his dyslexia went on to study medicine at Christ's College, Cambridge. He completed his national service in Germany, did his clinical training at Guy's Hospital and Lewisham Hospital. In 1955 he travelled to Chicago on a Fulbright Scholarship, where he studied the recently developed technique of renal biopsy. Soothill began working at Birmingham University's experimental pathology department in 1956 as a nephrologist. His work at Birmingham centred around kidney disease, immunoglobins and the complement system. He also pioneered the use of cyclophosphamide in children with relapsing nephrotic syndrome.

In 1965, Soothill moved from Birmingham to the UCL Great Ormond Street Institute of Child Health, where he was appointed the first Hugh Greenwood Professor of Immunology, a post he would hold for 20 years. One of his main achievements at Great Ormond Street was classifying the different subtypes of severe combined immunodeficiency (SCID). The disease, informally known as "boy in the bubble syndrome" after David Vetter, was given its current name by Soothill in the 1970s. He also focused on childhood allergies, proposing the theory that allergies and eczema resulted from the exposure to allergens in the first six months of a baby's life. He pioneered the use of elimination diets whereby a child with an unknown food allergy is denied all possible allergic sources in their diet, then each food is reintroduced one by one until the causative food is identified.

Soothill retired in 1985 to Devon with his wife Brenda Thornton, whom he had married in 1951. He died on 23 September 2004 in Axminster.
