= Grace Stott =

British missionary

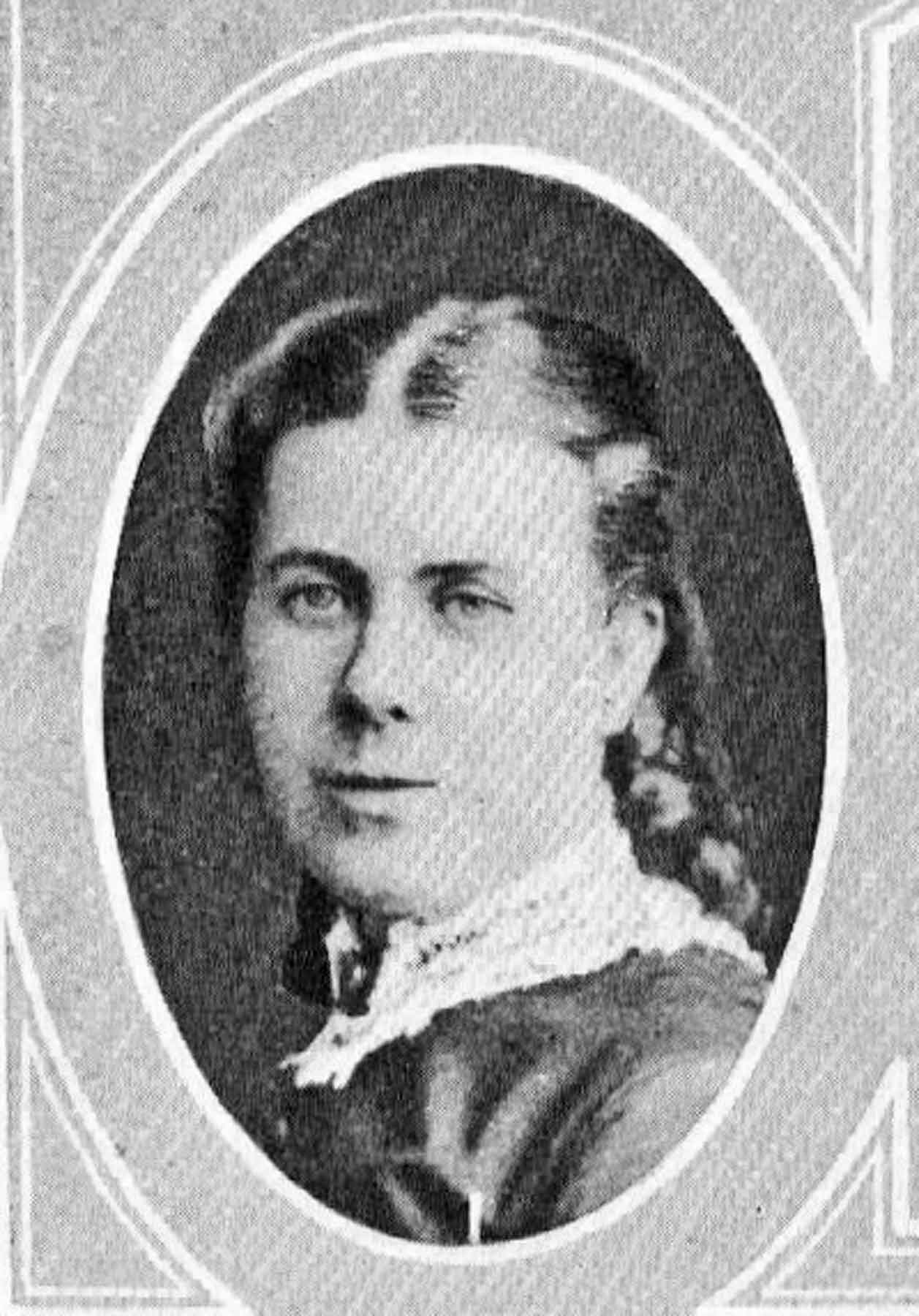
- Born: Grace Cigie; 12 March 1845 prob. Scotland
- Died: 24 January 1922 (aged 76); Toronto
- Occupation: Missionary
- Employer: China Inland Mission
- Known for: long service in China founding schools
- Spouse: George Stott

Grace Stott, born Grace Cigie (12 March 1845 – 24 January 1922), was a British Protestant missionary in China. She went to China after a marriage proposal arrived in the post. She worked in Wenzhou where she created a school for girls. Her husband George Stott died in 1889. She then returned to China. The mission was struck by riots twice and a cholera epidemic. She became the head of the mission and finally left the mission in 1909 twenty years after he was sacked and his death. Her husband is credited with the mission's success.

== Life ==
She was born in 1845 and brought up in Glasgow by her grandmother, who died. At sixteen she was an enthusiastic Christian with no home ties. She wanted to be a missionary in China after hearing Hudson Taylor speak in Glasgow. She was accepted to go until she fell ill. When the large Lammermuir Party sailed she was left behind on the dock. The opportunity passed her by and she was moved to establish a more domestic mission to the red light districts of Glasgow. She was busy with this when a letter arrived from a young Scot George Stott who she had met. He proposed marriage to her, by mail, and she accepted. George was unusual as he had been chosen as a China Inland Mission (i.e. non denominational) missionary despite having lost a leg. He had planned to take another woman to China as his wife, but her parents disapproved of her going to China.

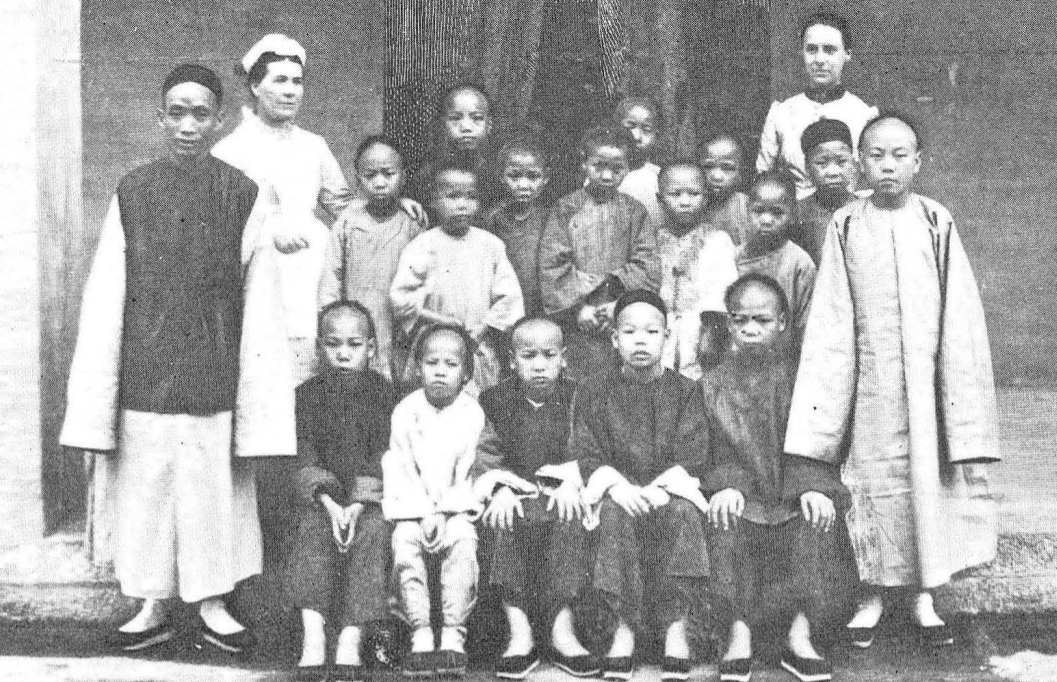
Teacher and students at the boys school. Stott is at left and Miss Bardsley is at right. Stott's memoir notes that the front six are converted and three are unpaid preachers

She travelled out to China arriving in Shanghai in 1870 on her birthday. They were married. They worked together as a team in China. George had created a boys school which contained some converts and some aspiring evangelists. Grace realised that they would have no Christian wives to marry so she created a girls' school in 1875.

There was a lot of resistance to foreign missionaries. On 4 October 1884 the various missions in Wenzhou were completely destroyed by rioters. Her husband was there and he was lucky to get away. Another source says that although wife and his followers learnt to handle his manner which could be direct. He increasingly came into conflict with Hudson Taylor and he had offered to resign in a protest letter. The CIM stopped sending recruits to his station and eventually they "let him go".

George had cancer and they returned to Scotland. George died in 1889 in Cannes where they had gone as a guest of a supporter of their work. She returned to Wenzhou arriving in the following February where she was welcomed. She was now the de facto head of the mission and of the schools and she was there until 1895 when she left due to further riots. An escape as her colleagues died in a cholera epidemic.

Whilst away from the mission she finished and published her biography, "26 years missionary work in China", in 1897 After the publication she returned again to Wenzhou until she retired in 1907.

Stott died in Toronto in 1922.

== Legacy ==
Wenzhou is known in China as the “Jerusalem of the East” because in the entire Wenzhou Municipality, which has 6 million inhabitants, there are more than 600,000 evangelical Protestants – 10% of the population. Although Grace Stott worked with her husband and led the mission for twenty years after his death it is her husband and William Edward Soothill who are credited for creating the basis for the large number of Christian adherents in Wenzhou today.
