= Robert Lock Graham Irving =

English schoolmaster, writer and mountaineer

Robert Lock Graham Irving (17 February 1877 – 10 April 1969) was an English schoolmaster, climbing writer and mountaineer. As an author, he used the name R. L. G. Irving, while to his friends he was Graham Irving. He is noted for being the person who introduced George Mallory to mountaineering.

== Life and family ==
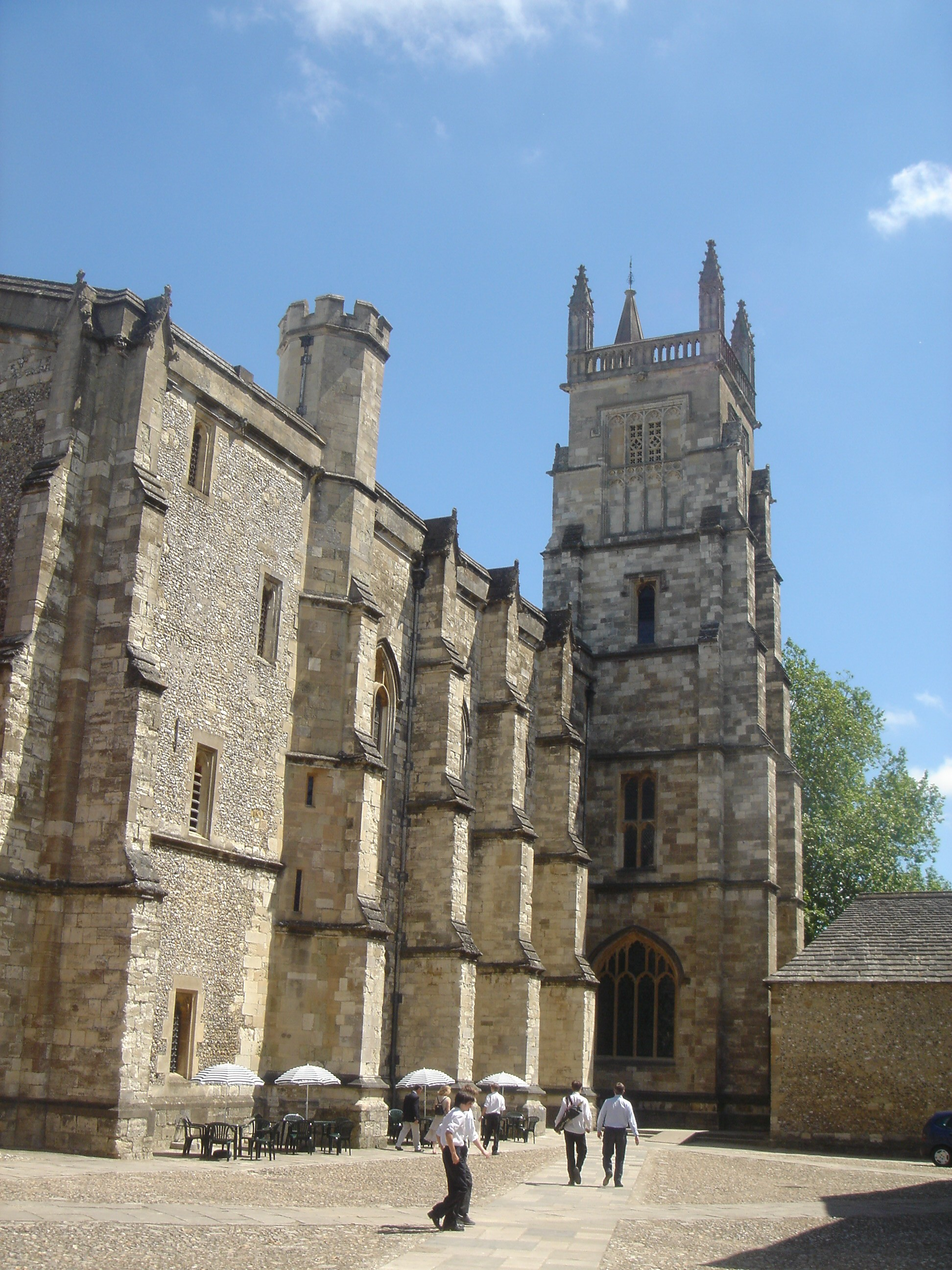
Winchester College Chapel (right) and scholars' College (left), where Irving was Master and Mallory a scholar

Irving was the son of an Anglican clergyman, and was educated at Liverpool College, Winchester College and New College, Oxford. He returned to Winchester as a master, teaching French and mathematics and becoming 'Master in College', in charge of the ancient house for the holders of foundation scholarships, and founded a climbing group known as the Winchester Ice Club.

He married Oriane Sophy Tyndale in 1908 and had two sons, Francis Graham Irving (1910–87) and Robert Irving (1913–91), and two daughters, Mary Oriane and Clare. Robert became a distinguished conductor and was musical director of the New York City Ballet, 1958 to 1989, as well as following in his father's footsteps as an amateur mountaineer. In 1991, his daughter's name was Clare Peters.

Irving died on 10 April 1969, aged 92.

== Mountaineering ==
In The Romance of Mountaineering, Irving writes that he was introduced to mountains at an early age: "My earliest recollections of a summer holiday centre round the ascent of a Welsh hill." Several years later he began exploring the hills on his own:

One early lesson in the Lake District, when I was about fifteen, impressed itself vividly on my memory. The mist was thick and night was closing in as I came cautiously and wonderingly down the steep southern face of Great Gable, while my parents in the vale of Newlands were sending out a man to blow a horn upon the hills, in the hope that the missing son was near enough to hear. It was my first taste of the awful thrill which the close presence of steep mountains can inspire.

—

Irving became a member of the Alpine Club in 1902 and was an advocate of climbing without a mountain guide, which in those days was thought by some to be reckless, but which Irving undertook "on account of boredom [of being guided] and expense". His climbing partner – a fellow Winchester schoolmaster – having been killed in a fall early in 1904, Irving went on a solitary climbing trip to the Sierra Nevada in the Easter vacation of that year. Finding the experience unsatisfactory – "If you climb for novelty and excitement solitary climbing is the kind to satisfy you; but if you climb for recreation of mind and body it is a failure" – he was left looking for new people with whom to climb during the summer of 1904. He took to finding companions – he called them "recruits" – for his alpine trips from within the ranks of seventeen- and eighteen-year-old boys at Winchester College, the enlistment of the first of whom (Harry Gibson)

took place on the occasion of my finding him developing photographs during illicit hours. A tactful remark of his about a Swiss photograph led to an amiable discussion. He had seen the Alps, and had once stood on the summit of the Cima di Jazzi; so in his case the sacred fire needed no special kindling, but only replenishing.

—

The second of these recruits was "a special friend of the first [who] was soon enlisted, and the planning of the campaign began". This was the seventeen-year-old George Mallory, a mathematics scholar at Winchester who later disappeared on the 1924 British Expedition to Mount Everest. As Irving later remarked, "It was just chance that I took out to the Alps in 1904 a boy destined to become so famous on Everest." Much of Irving's fame derives from his being the person who introduced Mallory to mountaineering. Aside from Gibson and Mallory, who both went on the first trip in 1904, other members of the Winchester Ice Club were Guy Bullock (who, along with Mallory, was the first to reach Mount Everest's North Col, in 1921) and Harry Tyndale.

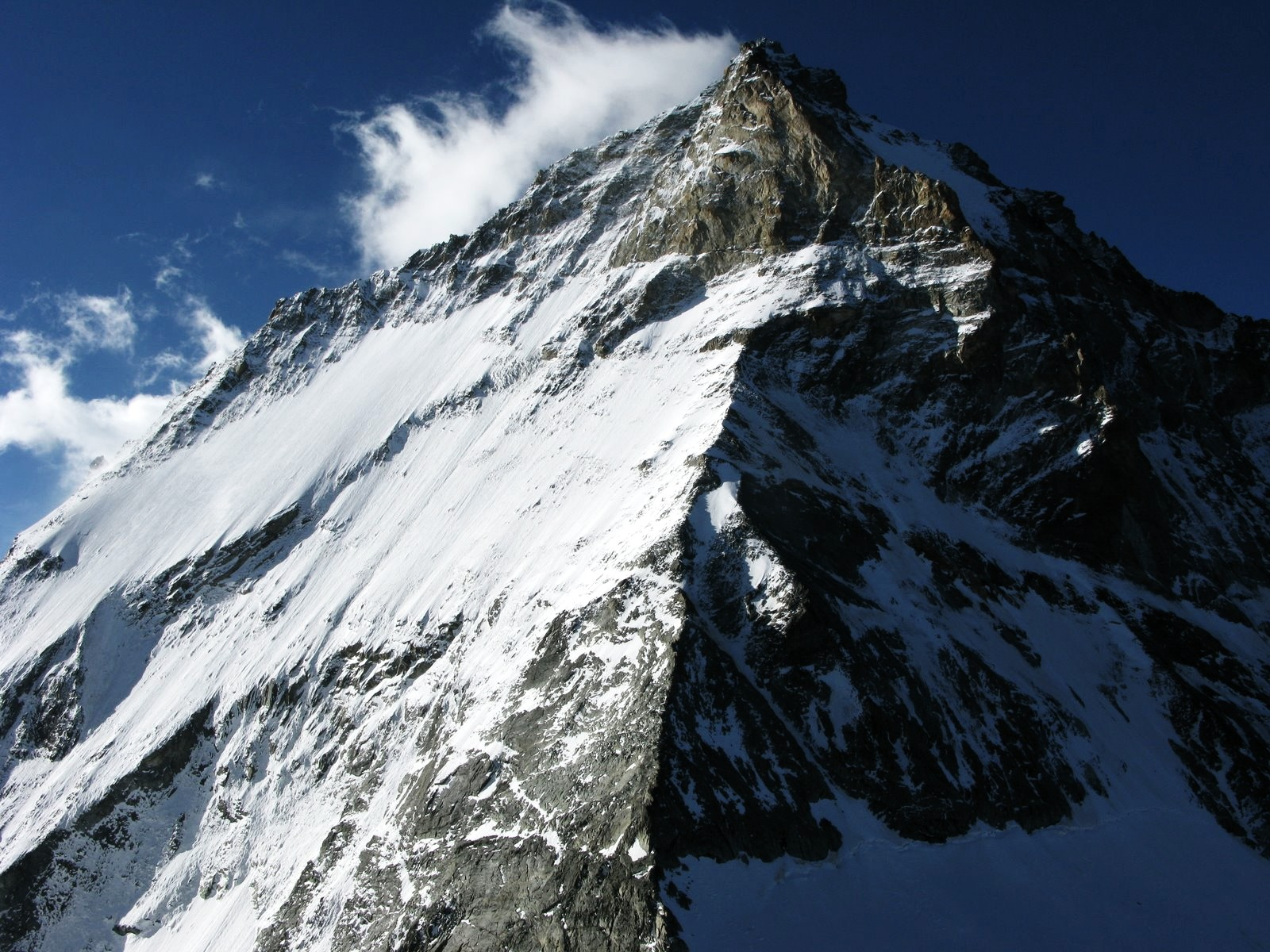
The Dent Blanche

According to Irving's address to the Alpine Club, entitled 'Five Years with Recruits', the Ice Club's series of controversial expeditions to climb some of the highest mountains in the Alps began in 1904, and peaks such as the Grand Combin, Dent Blanche, Aiguille du Blaitière, Bietschhorn, Aiguille de Bionnassay, Grunhorn, Mittaghorn, Aletschhorn, Monte Rosa and Mont Blanc were successfully ascended. Rock climbing trips were also undertaken to Snowdonia, using the Pen-y-Gwryd hotel as a base, and snow craft was practised in the Scottish Highlands in winter.

The feelings of the Alpine Club towards the leading of boys up potentially dangerous mountains were expressed in a 'Condemnation', in which Tom George Longstaff stated that he "did not think that members would agree with him about the advisability of such expeditions". This was followed by 'A Disclaimer', published in the Alpine Journal for 1909 and signed by mountain climbers including Longstaff, Geoffrey Winthrop Young, Claud Schuster, W. P. Haskett Smith and D. W. Freshfield, in which these members of the club, and nine others, '[desire] to place on record that we disclaim responsibility for any encouragement which Mr. Irving's paper may give to expeditions undertaken after the manner therein described'. However, as Claire Engel wrote in 1971, "it seems that Irving's methods have been adopted by various organisations."

Irving continued to climb with Mallory after the latter had left Winchester; in 1911 Irving led Mallory and another of his ex-pupils, Harry Tyndale, on the third ascent of the Kuffner (or Frontier) ridge on Mont Maudit. According to Helmut Dumler, Mallory was "apparently prompted by the death of friends on the Western Front in 1916 [to write] a highly emotional article of his ascent of this great climb"; this article was published as 'Mont Blanc from the Col du Géant by the Eastern Buttress of Mont Blanc' in the Alpine Journal.

Irving's book Ten Great Mountains (1940) sets out the climbing history up to then of Snowdon, Ben Nevis, Ushba, Mount Logan, Everest, Nanga Parbat, Kanchenjunga, the Matterhorn, Mount Cook and Mont Blanc.

Irving kept up to date with mountaineering developments in the Greater Ranges, writing of the Muztagh Tower (7,273 m) in the Karakorum that it was "Nature's last stronghold – probably the most inaccessible of all the great peaks, its immense precipices show no weakness in its defence".

In a pamphlet called The Mountains Shall Bring Peace (1947), Irving describes the benefits he has had from his own climbing and proposes greater participation in mountaineering as a way to achieve international brotherhood and peace.

== Books and articles by Irving ==
- 'The Ligurian Alps in Spring', Alpine Journal, August 1911
- 'Une nuit d'avril ... à la Brèche de Roland et au Taillon', La Montagne (journal of the Club alpin français), Sept–Oct 1929
- The Romance of Mountaineering , J. M. Dent & Sons Ltd, 1935
- La conquête de la montagne, Paris, Payot (Bibliothèque géographique), 1936
- The Mountain Way, an anthology in prose and verse, collected by R. L. G. Irving, xxii + 656 pp., London, J. M. Dent, 1938; New York, Dutton, 1938
- The Alps, London, B. T. Batsford, 1938; New York, Charles Scribner's Sons, 1940; revised editions, B. T. Batsford, 1942 and 1947
- Ten Great Mountains, J. M. Dent & Sons, 1940
- (As translator), My Caves, from the French of Norbert Casteret, London, J.M. Dent & Sons, 1947
- The Mountains Shall Bring Peace, iv + 47 pp., Oxford, Blackwell, 1947
- (With Guido Rey), The Matterhorn: Guido Rey's Il Monte Cervino was first published in English in 1907, in a translation from the Italian by J. E. C. Eaton; a revised edition, with two further chapters by R. L. G. Irving, was published in Oxford by Basil Blackwell, 1946, and reprinted in 1949
- (As translator), Cave Men New and Old, from the French of Norbert Casteret, London, J. M. Dent & Sons Ltd, 1951
- A History of British Mountaineering, B. T. Batsford, 1955

=== Selected quotations ===
- "There are routes up many peaks in the Alps, Mont Blanc and the Matterhorn being conspicuous examples, on which a solitary climber risks little more than a man who wanders alone on a wild Yorkshire moor." – R. L. G. Irving, from Alpine Journal (1909)
- "A mountain becomes great as a human personality does, by extending its influence over the thoughts, words and actions of mankind." – R. L. G. Irving, from Ten Great Mountains, 1940
- "Mountains... by the interchange of what we have given them and they have given us, there is a part of our personality in them and of theirs in us that is indestructible." – R. L. G. Irving, from Alpine Journal (1937)
