= William Edward Soothill =

Methodist missionary

William Edward Soothill, FRGS (1861 – 1935) was a Methodist missionary to China who later became Professor of Chinese at the University of Oxford, and a leading British sinologist.

== Life ==
Born in Halifax, Yorkshire in January 1861, Soothill matriculated at London University. He entered the ministry of the United Methodist Free Church arriving in China in 1882 and spent 29 years as a missionary in Wenzhou, China. Another leading missionary there until 1909 was Grace Stott who led the China Inland Mission there.

Soothill founded a hospital, a training college, schools and 200 preaching stations. In 1911 Soothill became President of the Imperial University at Shanxi. Upon his return to England in 1920 he was appointed Professor of Chinese at Oxford University.

In 1921, he was awarded the Order of Wen-Hu (third class) by the Republic of China in recognition of services rendered in connection with the Chinese Labour Corps in France. In 1926 he was a member of Lord Willingdon's delegation to China on the settlement of the Boxer Rebellion indemnities.

He is best known for his translation into English of the Analects of Confucius and his Dictionary of Chinese Buddhist Terms with Sanskrit and English Equivalents and a Sanskrit-Pali Index.

He married Lucy Farrar in 1884. She wrote an account of their years in China entitled A Passport to China. A daughter (born 1885) was Dorothea Hosie, whose husband was the diplomat Sir Alexander Hosie; Lady Hosie was the author of a number of books about China. William and Lucy also had a son, Victor, in 1888, who became the father of John Farrar Soothill (both doctors).

== Selected works ==
- William Edward Soothill (1900). The student's four thousand [characters] and general pocket dictionary (2 ed.). American Presbyterian Mission Press. p. 420.
- William Edward Soothill (1903). The student's four thousand ...: characters and general pocket dictionary, Volume 3 (3 ed.). American Presbyterian Mission Press. p. 420.
- William Edward Soothill (1908). The student's four thousand tzu and general pocket dictionary (6 ed.). American Presbyterian Mission Press. pp. 211.
- The Student's Four Thousand and General Pocket Dictionary (1899)
- A Mission in China (1906,1907)
- The Analects of Confucius. Published by the Author. 1910 – via Internet Archive.
- China and Education, with Special Reference to the University for China (1912)
- The Three Religions of China (1913; revised edition 1929)
- Timothy Richard of China (1924)
- China and the West: A sketch of their Intercourse (1925)
- A History of China (1927)
- China and England (1928)
- The Lotus of the Wonderful Law: or, The Lotus Gospel (1930)
- A Dictionary of Chinese Buddhist Terms: with Sanskrit and English Equivalents and a Sanskrit-Pali Index (1937, with Lewis Hodous)
- The Hall of Light: A study of Early Chinese Kingship, edited by Lady Hosie and G. F. Hudson (1951)

== Sources ==
The Methodist Archives Biographical Index: Minutes of Conference 1958 and Encyclopedia of World Methodism (1974)

== References and further reading ==
- Young, John (2012). "William E. Soothill (1861-1935): Missionary and Sinologist" (PDF). Methodist Heritage.
