= Osmund Bullock =

English actor

Osmund Haddan Watson Bullock (born 25 July 1951) is an English stage, screen and musical theatre actor.

He is also the current head of the historic Bullock family about which he wrote a history in 2005.

== Early life ==
Bullock was born in Kensington, the son of Richard Bullock CB (1920–1998) and his wife Beryl Haddan Markes, and the grandson of Sir Christopher Bullock and Barbara Lupton. He had an older sister, Susan Amaryllis Watson (1945 - 2015). From 1965, his father was head of the Ministry of Technology's machine tools, manufacturing machinery, and automation division. His great-grandfather, Llewellyn Christopher Watson Bullock (1866–1936) was born at Faulkbourne Hall near Witham, the family seat since 1637. His earliest known ancestor is an Osmund Bullock who was recorded in 1166 at Arborfield, in the Pipe rolls for Berkshire.

At the age of fourteen, while at Rugby School, Bullock played Clara Zachanassian, a millionaire ex-prostitute, in the play The Visit. He went on appearing in school plays. After leaving Rugby, he trained as a mechanical engineer, but for three years spent his summer holidays working with the National Youth Theatre. He then trained for a career in the theatre at the Webber Douglas Academy of Dramatic Art in London. By 1974 he had definitely given up engineering for the life of an actor, which he found had an "irresistible call".

An early screen role came in 1975 in Upstairs, Downstairs, playing Robin Eliot, the "tiresome suitor" of Georgina Worsley (Lesley-Anne Down).

== Stage ==
In July 1973, The Stage gave a good review to the performance of Bullock and Julian Fellowes as the Larrabee brothers in Sabrina Fair, a Webber Douglas Academy student play. His first professional work was in pantomime at Swindon, then for nine months he toured in six plays with the Cambridge Theatre Company. This was followed by rep at the Royal Theatre, Northampton. In 1974, he was playing Jack Worthing (Ernest) in The Importance of Being Earnest.

In April 1976, Bullock opened as Nigel Danvers in a revival of the musical Salad Days at the Duke of York's Theatre, which ran for months. In December 1977, he was playing Jack Chesney in Charley's Aunt, with Eric Sykes and Jimmy Edwards. A few months later, he was playing the lead in a Wyvern Theatre touring production of Terence Rattigan's French Without Tears. One review said of his performance "Osmund Bullock, looking and behaving like a 1930s version of John Cleese, is hilarious as the Hon. Alan Howard". He was in Charley's Aunt again at Chichester from December 1979 to January 1980.

In 1984, Bullock sang in a Sadler's Wells Theatre revival of the operetta Countess Maritza, playing the parts of Penizek and Baron Liebenberg (bass).

In 1987, Bullock appeared at the Plymouth on Broadway in Pygmalion with Amanda Plummer and Peter O'Toole, playing Freddy Eynsford Hill. From June to August 1991, he was Humphrey in Julian Slade's musical Nutmeg and Ginger at the Orange Tree Theatre, Richmond. In 1996, he played Melville in Schiller's Mary Stuart on the National Theatre's Lyttelton stage, in a new translation by Jeremy Sams. In 1998, he was back at the Orange Tree starring in David Lewis's Bad Faith opposite Patricia Garwood.

In June 2006, Bullock played Boustead and other parts in a revival of John Mortimer's A Voyage Round My Father at the Donmar Warehouse, with Derek Jacobi.

== Screen ==
- Scene: A First-Class Friend (1974) as Martin
- Upstairs, Downstairs (1975) as Robin Eliott
- Raffles: the Amateur Cracksman (1975) as Viscount Crowley
- Nicholas Nickleby (1977) as Snobb
- The Lost Boys (1978) as Jack Llewelyn Davies
- Danger UXB (1979), seven episodes as Alan Pringle
- Minder (1979) as Brian
- The Brylcreem Boys (1979) as Bredding
- Pride and Prejudice (1980) as Mr Bingley
- If You Go Down in the Woods Today (1981) as PC Turner
- Convoy PQ 17 as Lieutenant Colin Beale RN
- The Agatha Christie Hour (1982) as George Rowland
- Charles & Diana: A Royal Love Story (1982)
- Duty Free (1984), as Peter
- The Bill: A Dangerous Breed (1984) as Lord Barstow-Smythe
- C.A.T.S. Eyes (1985), as Sam
- The Twilight Zone (1985) as Andrew
- Gentlemen and Players (1988) as Alex Castle (13 episodes)
- So You Think You've Got Troubles (1991) as Army Officer
- The Cinder Path (1994) as Major Smith
- The Trial of Lord Lucan (1994) as Bill Shand-Kydd
- Treasure Island (1995) as Captain Smollett
- A Dance to the Music of Time (1997) as Erridge (4 episodes)
- A Touch of Frost (1999) as Peter Davidson
- Bertie and Elizabeth (2002) as Radio newscaster
- Heartbeat (2004) as Colin Taylor
- The Life and Death of Peter Sellers (2004) as Newscaster
- Dunkirk (2004) as Colonel Whitfield

== Selected publications ==
- Osmund Bullock, Faulkbourne and the Bullocks (2005)
