= John Bullock (1731–1809) =

British politician and militia officer (1731–1809)

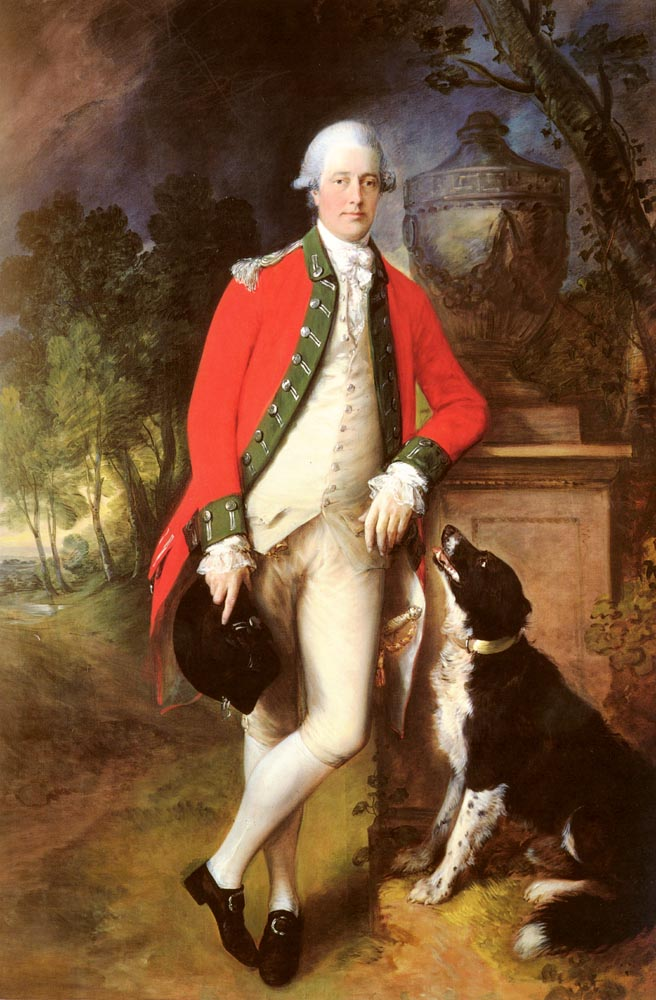
c. 1780 portrait of Bullock by Thomas Gainsborough

Colonel John Bullock (31 December 1731 – 28 December 1809) was a British politician and militia officer who represented the constituencies of Maldon, Steyning and Essex in the British House of Commons from 1754 to 1810. Born in Faulkbourne, Essex, he was a prominent member of the Bullock family whose long service in Parliament resulted in the title of father of the House being bestowed on him.

== Early years ==
John Bullock was born on 13 December 1731 in Faulkbourne, Essex. He was the eldest surviving son of Josiah Bullock J.P. D.L. of Faulkbourne and Mincing Lane, London and Hannah Cooke, youngest daughter of Sir Thomas Cooke, Member of Parliament for Colchester and governor of the East India Company. Bullock was educated as a fellow commoner at Clare College, Cambridge and at Lincoln's Inn (1750). He succeeded to Faulkbourne Hall on the death of his father in 1752.

== Political career ==
At the age of 23, he embarked on a parliamentary career that lasted 56 years and culminated in him becoming father of the house until his death.

His period in the house spanned the Seven Years’ War, the War of American Independence, the French Revolution and the earlier Napoleonic Wars. He sat as a fellow member with the Pitts, Burke, Fox and Sheridan.

He commenced his parliamentary career in 1754 as member for Maldon; he was returned twice more for the borough in 1761 and in 1768 (polling 443 votes against the 455 of John Huske and the 328 of Jon Hennker). In 1774, he temporarily abandoned his parliamentary career for reasons of cost and it was not until 1780 that he returned to the house.

He was returned as member for Steyning in Sussex in 1780, which returned two members until the Reform Bill of 1832. Steyning began returning two Members of Parliament from 1278 and as a rotten borough made up of a depopulated port became similar to Dunwich until the Reform Act 1832.

In 1784, he shared the representation of the County of Essex with Thomas Bramston of Screens and sat as Whig Member for the county continuously and without contest for 26 years until his death in 1809. This absence of contest was due a "family compact", which was the outcome of the ruinous expenses of the two previous elections, by which for more than thirty years one Whig and one Tory were regularly returned. The colonel's second co-member was Admiral Harvey who commanded the “Téméraire” at Trafalgar.

The colonel is recorded as being a member of Boodle's club in St James's in 1787.

Despite the efforts of other parliamentarians, the colonel resisted attempts to make him understand the complexities of foreign affairs and his kinsman, the Duke of Bedford, described him as "a good-natured fox-hunting boy"; the colonel's grandfather was Edward Bullock MP, of Faulkbourne Hall (1663-1705), whose relative was Elizabeth Howland, Duchess of Bedford, wife of Wriothesley Russell, 2nd Duke of Bedford. Both the colonel and the Duke of Bedford had their portraits painted in the early 1770s by Thomas Gainsborough. Colonel Bullock never made a speech in Parliament during his career.

The long duration of the "compact" was due to the high respect in which Colonel Bullock was held throughout the county for his political independence and he was well-liked. At his death, the peaceful state of affairs came to an end.

== Military service ==
Bullock was appointed an officer in the East Essex Militia, a battalion-sized unit of the British Militia, at the rank of colonel in 1759. He was the second in command of the unit when it was first mustered on 15 November 1759 and when it was mustered again on 19 April 1778 after the outbreak of the American War of Independence.

== Faulkbourne ==
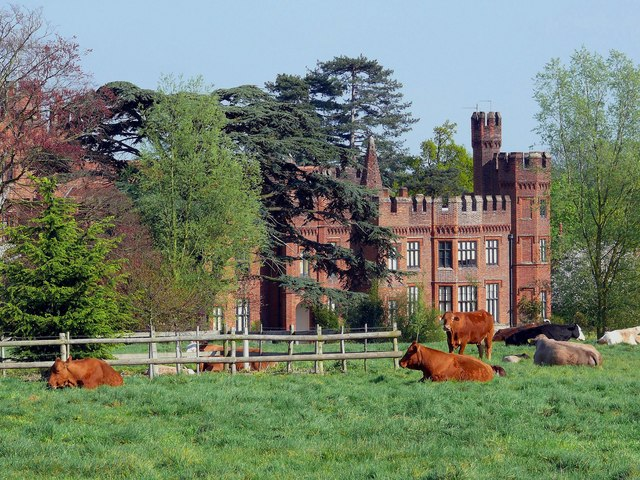
Faulkbourne Hall

He took a keen interest in Faulkbourne Hall and undertook many improvements to the house and grounds in the 18th century. A drawing shows a Palladianisation of the west front, but the later work seems to have taken it back to – and extended – the gothic original look. He ordered fine tapestries from Aubusson in France and armorial porcelain from China.

A patron of the arts, he founded a wide-ranging collection of pictures. In 1803, the house contained many good paintings by van Dyck, Van de Velde, Michelangelo, Sir William Beechey, Sartorius and other masters.

== Family ==
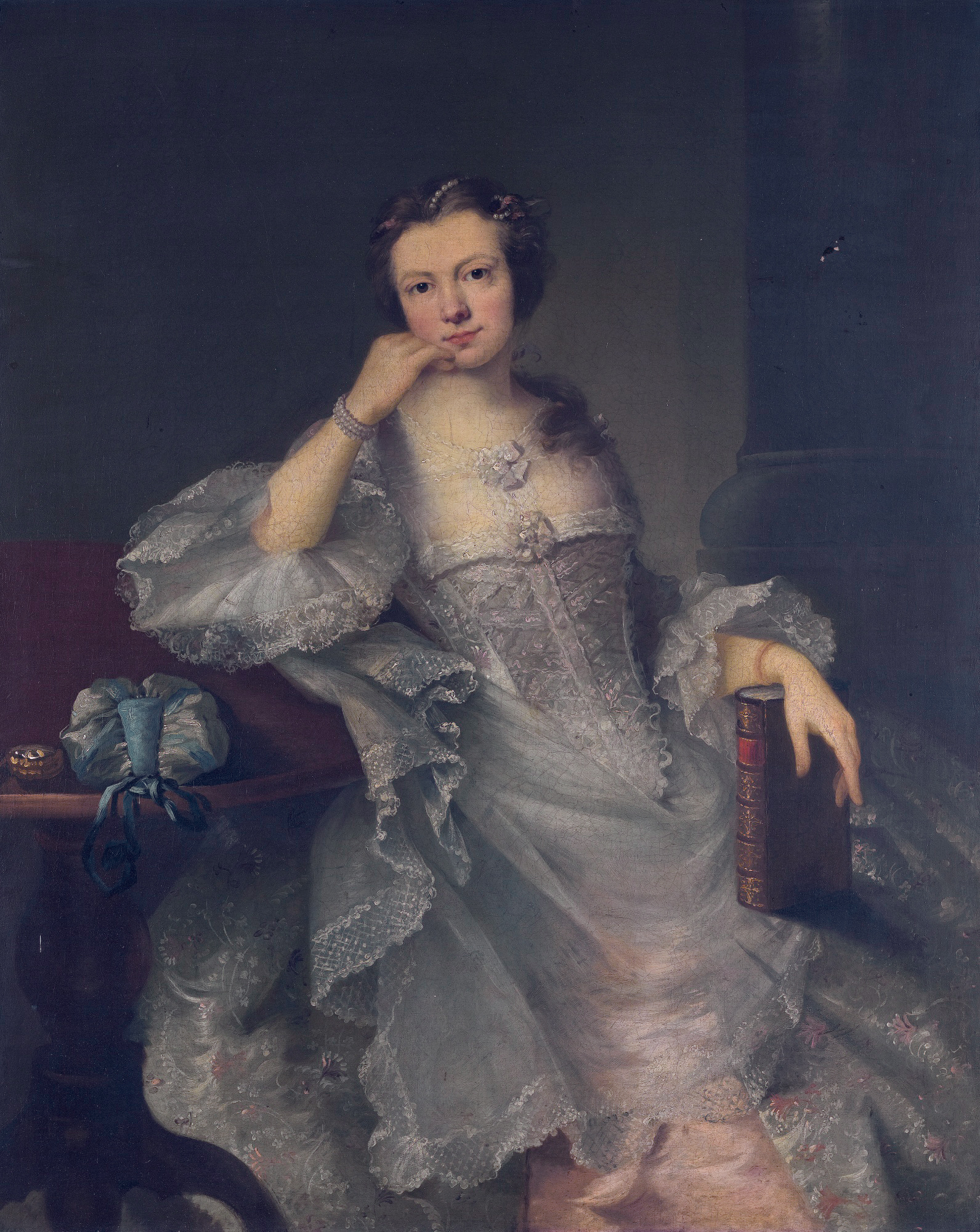
Elizabeth Bullock (née Lant)

Whilst his wife Elizabeth (née Lant) was a considerable heiress to large slum estates in Southwark of over 17 acres and containing 400 houses, he exhausted a large part of her fortune on Parliamentary life. She died in 1793 and they had no children. He left his estates on his death, in 1809, to his nephew, Jonathan Josiah Christopher Watson, son of his sister, Elizabeth who had married Jonathan Watson JP DL FRS of Ringhall in Suffolk. In 1810, Jonathan Josiah Christopher took the surname Bullock under the Royal sign-manual.

The death of the colonel without issue led to the first break in the regular family succession for more than 200 years, since John Bullock of Moulsham founded the Essex Branch of the family.

== Gainsborough portrait ==
In the early 1770s, a fine portrait was painted by Gainsborough showing the colonel in full uniform resting his left elbow on a pedestal which supports a classic urn. In his right hand, he holds his laced hat. By his side sits a large Newfoundland dog. In the background are trees and water.

The Gainsborough portrait has been at auction several times in the past 25 years: it made £1.2m in 1987, and then £2.65m in 2002, both times setting a world record for Gainsborough. Before the 1987 sale it had been in the same British collection for 90 years - for a long time it was on loan to the government, and hung at 10 Downing Street for two years.

== See also ==
- Bullock family
- Faulkbourne
- Sir Edward Bullock
- Professor Walter Llewellyn Bullock
- Sir Christopher Bullock

Parliament of the United Kingdom
Preceded by Sir Richard Lloyd; Robert Colebrooke	Member of Parliament for Maldon; 1754–1774; With: Robert Colebrooke to 1761; Bamber Gascoyne 1761–68; John Huske 1768–73; Charles Rainsford 1773–74	Succeeded by Richard Savage Nassau; John Strutt
Preceded by Filmer Honywood; Sir Thomas Skipwith, Bt	Member of Parliament for Steyning; 1780–1784; With: Sir Thomas Skipwith, Bt	Succeeded by Sir John Honywood, Bt; Richard Howard
Preceded by John Luther; Thomas Berney Bramston	Member of Parliament for Essex; 1784–1800; With: Thomas Berney Bramston	Succeeded by Parliament of the United Kingdom
Parliament of the United Kingdom
Preceded by Parliament of Great Britain	Member of Parliament for Essex; 1801–1810; With: Thomas Berney Bramston to 1802; Eliab Harvey from 1802	Succeeded by Eliab Harvey; John Archer-Houblon
