= Walter Llewellyn Bullock =

Professor Walter Llewellyn Bullock (7 March 1890 – 19 February 1944) was a prominent member of the Bullock family, an English scholar, critic, teacher, lecturer and promoter of Italian Studies at the Universities of Chicago and Manchester where he was Serena Professor of Italian. He was founder, in 1937, and general editor of Italian Studies as the annual journal of the Society for Italian Studies. He left his exceptional collection of over 5,000 books and several hundred pamphlets including over 2,600 volumes printed between 1500 and c. 1625 and important critical editions of Dante, Petrarch, Boccaccio, Ariosto, and Torquato Tasso, as well as many works on the Questione della lingua to the Manchester University Library at the Victoria University of Manchester.

== Family ==
Bullock was born in London in 1890, the eldest son of Rev. Llewellyn Christopher Bullock and Cecil Spearman, daughter of Edmund Spearman C.M.G. and Lady Maria Louisa Spearman (née FitzMaurice). Walter was the elder brother of Sir Christopher Bullock.

== Early life ==
He was educated first at Liverpool College, where his father was a teacher, and then at Rugby School from 14 to 19 years old, leaving in 1909.

Bullock then travelled to the United States, where he became a metallurgical chemist in a large malleable-iron metal factory for five years. He spent his spare time taking a drama course and writing and performing plays.

He was a gifted actor and, when he entered Harvard University in 1913, he augmented his income-–he paid all his university expenses from his earnings as a tutor and out of scholarships won—by playing the leading man to Gertrude Kingston who had brought her repertory company to America in 1915 in a production of Shaw's plays. In 1917 he took both his B.A. and M.A. at Harvard.

Due to rheumatic fever as a child, he had a weak heart and was refused admission by the British, Canadian and American armies. Wanting to make some contribution to the War, he travelled with a mission subsidised by Harvard to Russia and Romania. He was in Petrograd at the time of the Russian Revolution; present at the storming of the Winter Palace; saw the fall of Kerensky and was nearly burnt to death by Bolsheviks who set fire to the car in which he was out on rescue work with others on his mission. He was then sent to Romania where he worked for two years in citizen relief running farms in the summer and soup kitchens in winter.

Returning to America in 1919, he married Hélène Louise Buhlert of Boston. His health had suffered from the hardships in Romania and after recuperating in Maine, he was able to resume studies at Harvard taking his PhD in Romance Languages in 1922. Having initially specialised in Old French, he decided to devote himself to the Italian field especially the Cinquecento.

He had started collecting sixteenth century Italian books whilst a student and described himself as a "bibliomaniac".

== Academic career ==
=== University of Chicago ===
In 1922, he was appointed Assistant Professor of Italian at Bryn Mawr College and after five years accepted, in 1927, an Associate Professorship in the Department of Romance Languages and Literatures in the University of Chicago. Professor William Nitze (father of Paul Nitze) described Bullock as "an enthusiastic and very effective teacher….and excellent research scholar. His library which he had accumulated with scrupulous care and at considerable financial sacrifice was one of the best in existence".

He continued his interest in acting participating in the Quadrangle Players of Chicago and producing fortnightly plays.

For many years he was Chairman of the Romance Section of the Modern Languages Association and established a Sede of the Dante Alighieri Society of Chicago. He was heavily involved supplying rotographs of rare European manuscripts to American scholars.

In 1933, he was award the Cavaliere della Corona d'Italia by King Victor Emmanuel in recognition of his services to Italian Studies in America.

His summers were often spent in Italy where he came to know the country and people well.

=== University of Manchester ===
In 1935, he was offered the Chair of Italian Studies at the University of Manchester. Relations between England and Italy were strained which made promotion of such studies difficult but he was undaunted.

Shortly after his arrival, he was elected to the Italian Committee of the Modern Languages Association and was one of its most active members until the outbreak of War.

In 1937, he realised, with the help of other scholars, his project of founding a quarterly review-–Italian Studies-–"planned as an English organ for the general furtherance, by publication or recording, of literary and scholarly work in the Italian field". The outbreak of War in 1939, and the intervention of Italy in 1940, forced Bullock to relinquish all his most cherished plans: contact with Italy became impossible and many students and others, who were co-operating with his efforts to further the cause of Italian scholarship, were called away on war service. His own researches and the publication of Italian Studies had to be suspended.

== War service ==
During the War, he worked for Civil Defence and lectured to the armed forces. His close understanding of America and England led him to work for greater mutual understanding.

He began to compile an Italian-English, English-Italian Dictionary. When Italy surrendered, he endeavoured to work for a truer understanding of the Italian position.

His arduous work of lecturing to the forces, entailing long and difficult journeys often in the black out led to strains on his health and he died suddenly aged only 54.

He was buried at St Stephen's Church, Great Wigborough in the north east corner of the churchyard.

== Legacy ==
He left his library, of 5,000 books and several hundred pamphlets, for the use of scholars, which is now housed in the John Rylands Library, University of Manchester. It comprises:

- over 2,600 volumes printed in the 16th century;
- nearly 2,000 books and pamphlets consisting of later editions of 16th-century works;
- a large number of reference works;
- hundreds of volumes of modern Italian writers and works of criticism.

== See also ==
- Bullock family
- Sir Edward Bullock
- Colonel John Bullock
- Sir Christopher Bullock
