= Henry Fortescue =

Henry Fortescue may refer to:

- Henry Fortescue (MP, died 1576) (by 1515–1576), English MP for Maldon and Sudbury
- Henry Fortescue (Lord Chief Justice) (fl. 1426), Lord Chief Justice of Ireland
