= Christopher Bullock =

Christopher Bullock may refer to:

- Christopher Bullock (civil servant)
- Christopher Bullock (actor)
