= St Germanus Church =

St Germanus Church may refer to:

== Churches in England ==
- St Germanus' Church, Faulkbourne, Essex
- St Germanus' Church, Rame, Cornwall
