= Edward Bullock =

Edward Bullock may refer to:

- Edward Bullock (English politician) (1663–1705), Member of Parliament for Essex in 1705
- Edward Bullock (American politician) (1822–1861), American politician and Confederate officer
- Sir Edward Bullock (c. 1580–1644), English landowner
