= Faulkbourne =

Hamlet and civil parish in Essex, England

Coordinates: 51.830°N 0.593°E

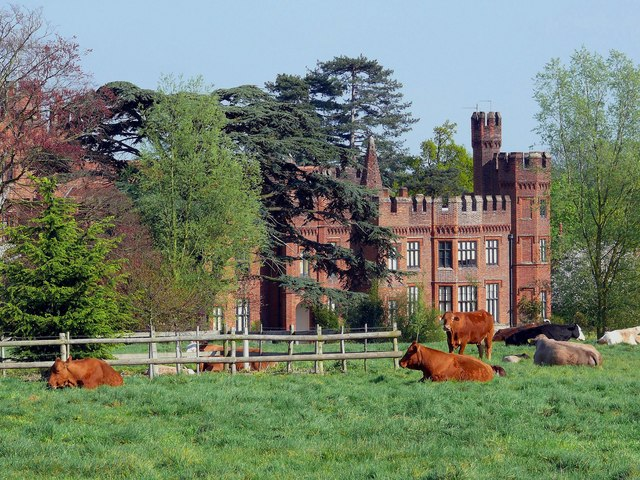
- Faulkbourne Hall

- Location within Essex
- Population: 91 (Parish, 2021)
- Civil parish: Faulkbourne
- District: Braintree
- Shire county: Essex
- Region: East
- Country: England
- Sovereign state: United Kingdom
- Post town: WITHAM
- Postcode district: CM8

Faulkbourne is a small settlement and civil parish in the Braintree district of Essex, England, about 2 miles (3 km) northwest of Witham. At the 2021 census the parish had a population of 91.

The name of the village (which was also spelled "Faulkbourn") is said to be derived from the Old English words "falk" or "folc" (meaning "folk") and "burn" (meaning "well").

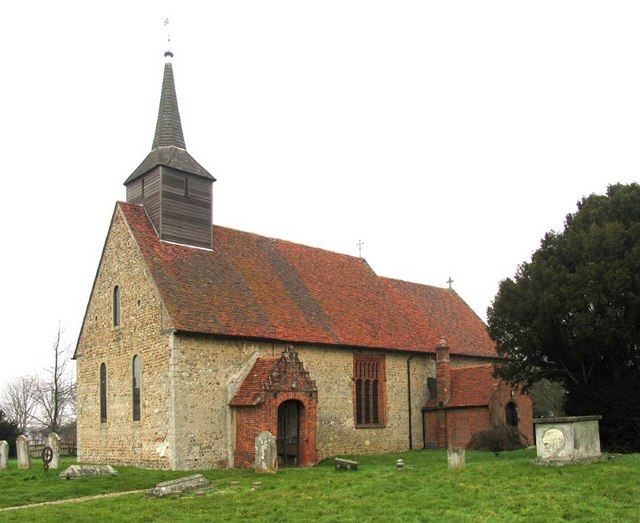
St Germanus' Church, Faulkbourne

The manor of Faulkbourne was centred on Faulkbourne Hall and nearby St Germanus' Church. The manor had been held by the Saxon lord Thorbiorn of Tolleshunt in the time of Edward the Confessor and by 1086 had been given by William the Conqueror to Hamo Dapifer as Tenant in Chief, whose granddaughter passed it by marriage to Henry I's natural son, Robert, Earl of Gloucester. It subsequently belonged to Richard de Luci, Lord Chief Justice of England and Sheriff of Essex in 1156. In 1243 Richard de Redvers succeeded to the manor.

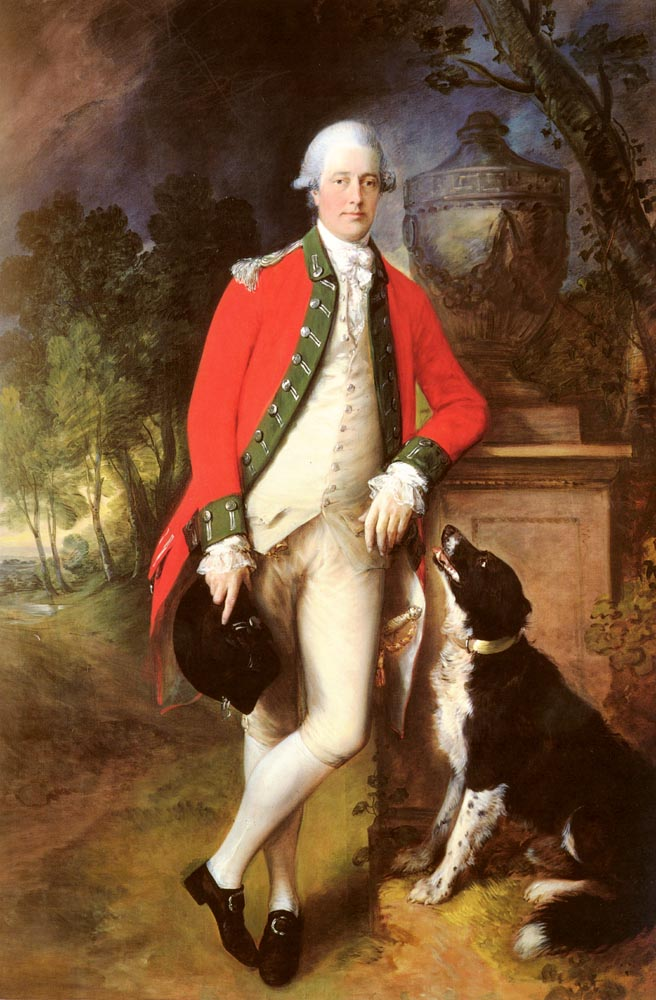
Colonel John Bullock and dog by Thomas Gainsborough

After passing through several hands, the manor was left by Sir Thomas Montgomery to his nephew John Fortescue in 1494, whose descendant of the same name sold it to Sir Edward Bullock in 1637. The Bullock family lived at Faulkbourne until the turn of the 20th century, and included Colonel John Bullock, Member of Parliament for several Essex constituencies for 56 years. In April 1885, Princess Louise, Duchess of Argyll (Queen Victoria's daughter) stood as sponsor at the christening of a member of the Bullock family.

== Notable people ==
- Sir Edward Bullock (c. 1580–1644), landowner
- John Bullock (1731–1809), landowner and politician
- William Bullock (1837–1904), cricketer and journalist
- Henry Fortescue (d. 1576), politician
- Dudley Fortescue (d. 1604), politician
- Rev. Francis William Galpin (1858–1945), clergyman and musicologist
- Rev. Frederick Spurrell (1824–1902), clergyman and archaeologist
