= Bullock family =

Family name from Southern England

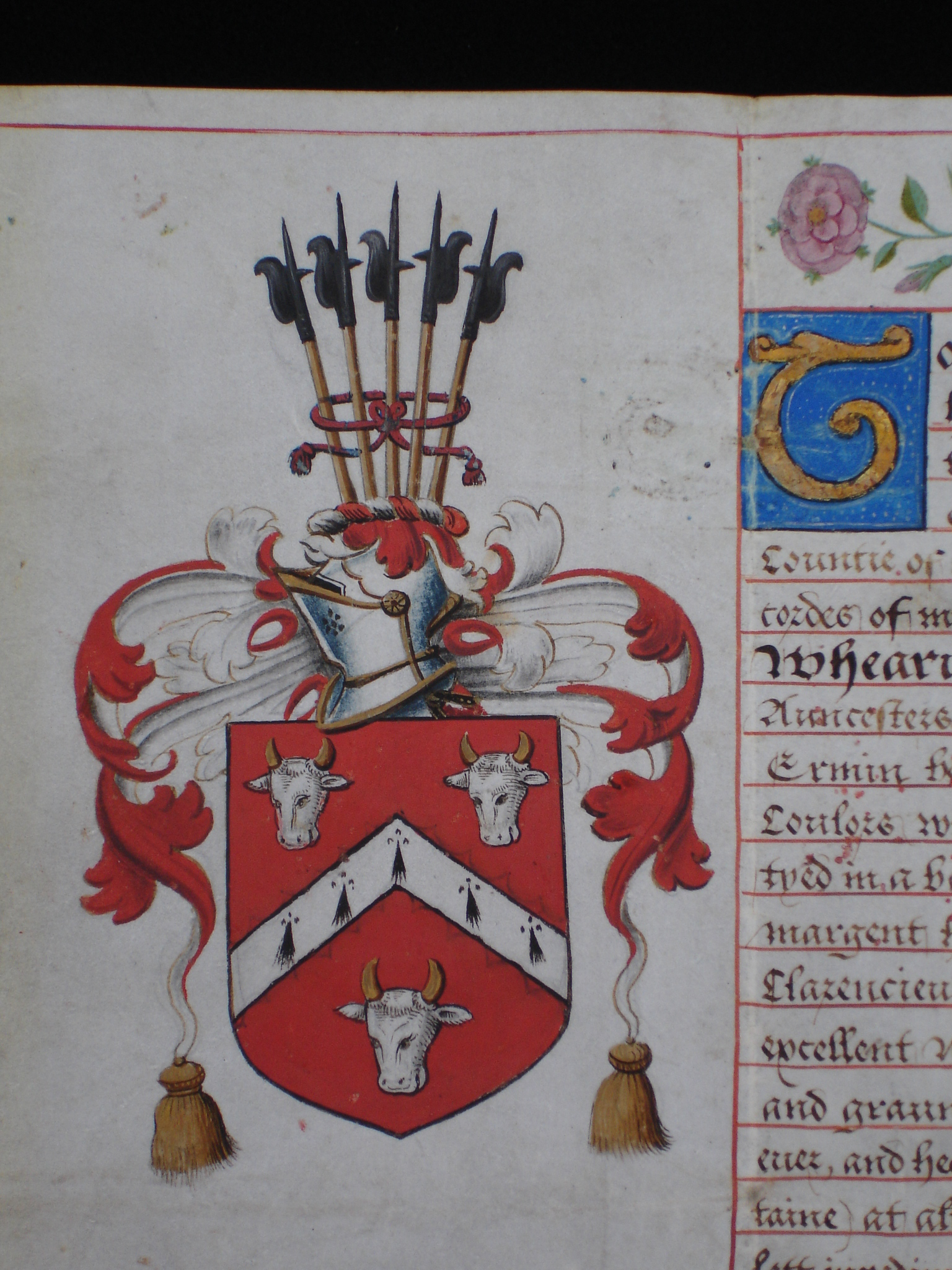
Coat of arms of the Bullock family (1602)

The Bullock family traces its roots to the 12th century, living primarily in the southern English counties of Berkshire and Essex from the mid-Norman period to the late Victorian era.

== Origins of the name ==
The name is derived from the Anglo-Saxon "bulluca", meaning a young bull, and is linked to the old Anglian and Norman Christian name Osmund. It represents one of the earliest instances of an English hereditary surname that was a purely personal nickname in origin.

== Coat of arms and motto ==
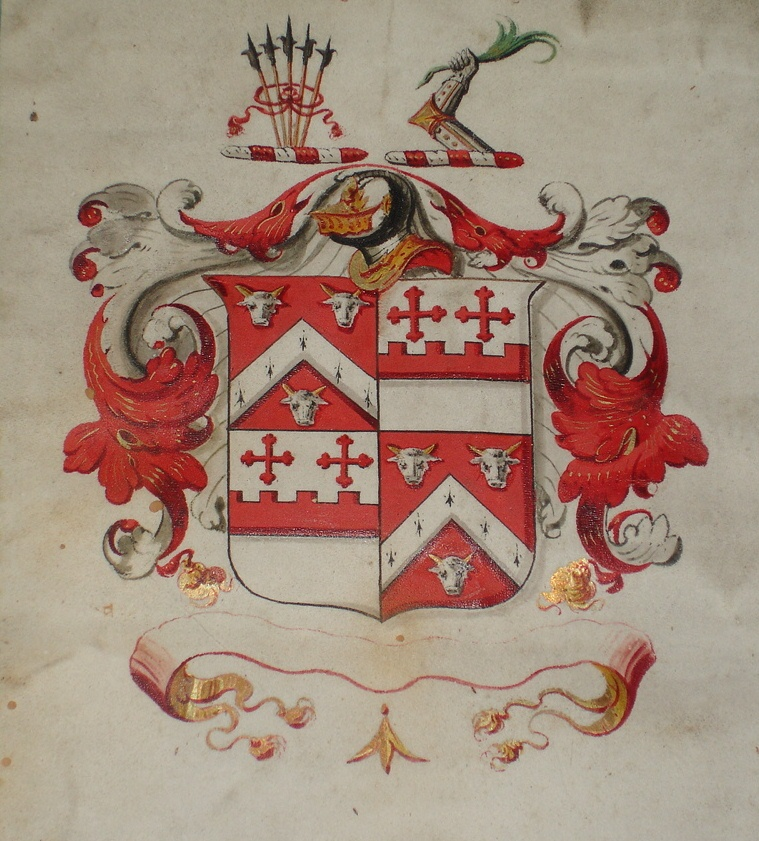
Arms – Bullock quartering Watson 1810

The first heraldic record in Berkshire, 1532, made during the reign of King Henry VIII, gives the arms of Thomas Bullock of Aborfield as:

- arms: gules, a chevron between three bull's heads cabossed argent, armed or.
- crest: on a wreath argent and azure, a wolf statant sable, charged with three estoiles or.

In Harvey's Visitation to Berkshire of 1565–1566, (when Queen Elizabeth I was on the throne), the crest had been changed to:

- seven bills, the staves gules, the blades sable, encircled by a wreath alternately argent and gules.

The confirmation of arms of Sir Edward Bullock in 1602, (again whilst Queen Elizabeth I was on the throne) was changed to read Gules a Cheueron Ermin between three Bulls heads caboshed argent horned d’or, upon the healme on a wreathe of Coulors white and Redd fyue black bills (so called of auntient tyme) the staues proper the heads sables tyed in a bande gules, manteled of the same dowbled argent.

When Jonathan Josiah Christoper Watson, the son of Elizabeth Bullock and Jonathan Watson, inherited Faulkbourn from his uncle, Col. John Bullock, he took the surname and arms of Bullock in 1810. The Bullock arms were quartered to include Watson arms as Second and Third thus: Argent a Fess Embattled and two Crosses Bottonnée in Chief Gules On a Wreath of Colours a dexter Arm embow’d in Armour proper, Garnished Or holding a Palm Branch Vert

The Bullock motto reads: nil conscire sibi – to have nothing on one's conscience.

== Notable family members ==
Notable members of the family include:

- Robert Bullock (died 1405), Sheriff for the Counties of Berkshire and Oxfordshire
- Thomas Bullock (died 1588), landowner, Gentleman Usher Extraordinary to Henry VIII and Commissioner for Berkshire
- Sir Edward Bullock, landowner (c. 1580–1644)
- Edward Bullock (1663–1705), politician and High Sheriff of Essex
- Col. John Bullock (1731–1809), landowner and politician
- William Henry Bullock (1837–1904), first class cricketer, journalist and historian
- Prof. Thomas Lowndes Bullock (1845–1915), colonial administrator, sinologist and academic.
- Guy Henry Bullock (1887–1956), diplomat and mountaineer.
- Prof. Walter Llewellyn Bullock (1890–1944), academic
- Sir Christopher Llewellyn Bullock (1891–1972), public servant and businessman.

== Bullocks of Arborfield ==
The earliest recorded member of the family is Osemundus Bulloc at Arborfield, Berkshire, who is found in the Pipe Rolls of Berkshire in 1166. The Herald's visitations of the 15th century include the name of his son, Richard. These and later visitations show the descent in an unbroken line to Sir Edward Bullock of Faulkbourne, Essex, who died in 1644.

Richard's son, Gilbert, made formal declaration in 1250 of his holding of the manor of Sunning from the Bishop of Salisbury.

Robert Bullock of Aborfield was Knight of the Shire for Berkshire (1382) and Sheriff for the Counties of Berkshire and Oxfordshire in 1384 and 1392 under Richard II. In 1394 he was Commissioner of the Peace for Berkshire. He had no male issue, so the Aborfield estates passed to Thomas Bullock, the grandson of his uncle Gilbert.

Another Thomas was Gentleman Usher Extraordinary to Henry VIII in 1516 and one of the Commissioners for Berkshire collecting the subsidy for Henry VIII in 1523. In 1544 he supplied archers, billmen and horses for the war with France, leading to the inclusion of seven bills originally in the family crest. Thomas's uncle, Hugh "with ye Brazen Hand", left Aberfield to found the family branch in Siddenhall (Sidnall), (Shropshire).

Thomas Bullock (1546–1595) was High Sheriff of Berkshire in 1581 and in the Commission of the Peace in 1592. He was the last Bullock of Arborfield, being obliged to sell the estates (the manors of Arberfield and Barkham, situated in the towns, villages and fields of Arberfeld, Barkham, Hurst, Ockingham, Shingfield and Erley) owing to accumulated debts. His uncle, George, refused to hand over the deeds. Thomas was forced by the family to produce a deed of entail and, having received the title deeds, went on to repudiate the deed. His brother and heir, William, litigated through the Court of Chancery and the Star Chamber but the sale was confirmed.

Thomas died in 1595, William, with the support of tenants, entered into possession in serious contempt of court, resulting in him being thrown into Fleet Prison. William continued actions to recover the estate in the Queen's Bench, then the Court of Common Pleas, and later petitioned the Elizabeth I, the Privy Council and the Lord Keeper, but in vain.

William, released from prison and now of Stratfield Mortimer, married well, his third wife being Elizabeth Bellet of Morton in Essex, restoring the family fortunes.

His son, John, moved the family to the Manor House of Mulsham, at Great Wigborough in Essex, where he purchased estates at Loftes in Great and Little Totham. These estates remained in the family until the death of Edward Bullock of Faulkbourne in 1705.

== Bullocks of Faulkbourne ==
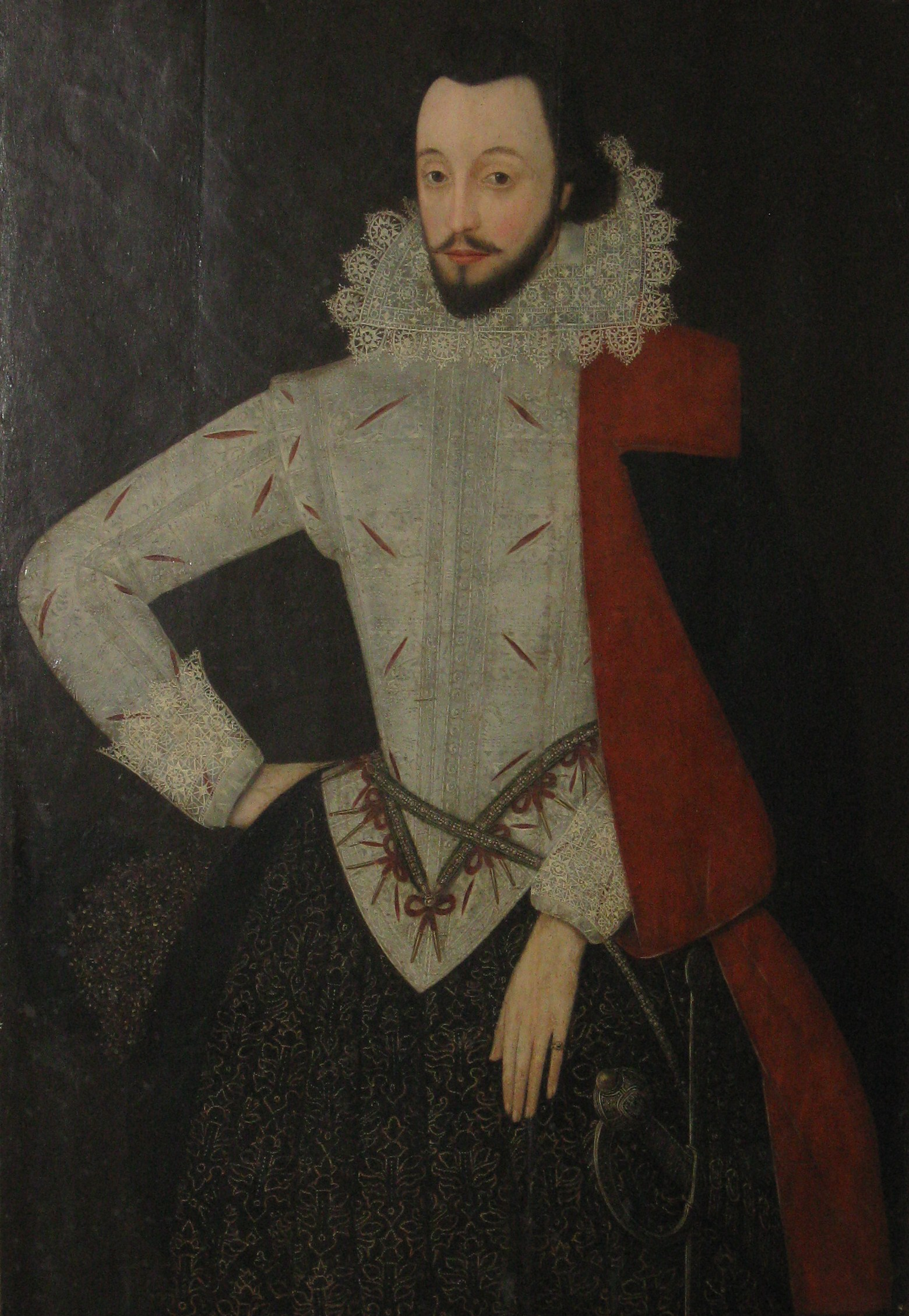
Sir Edward Bullock c. 1610

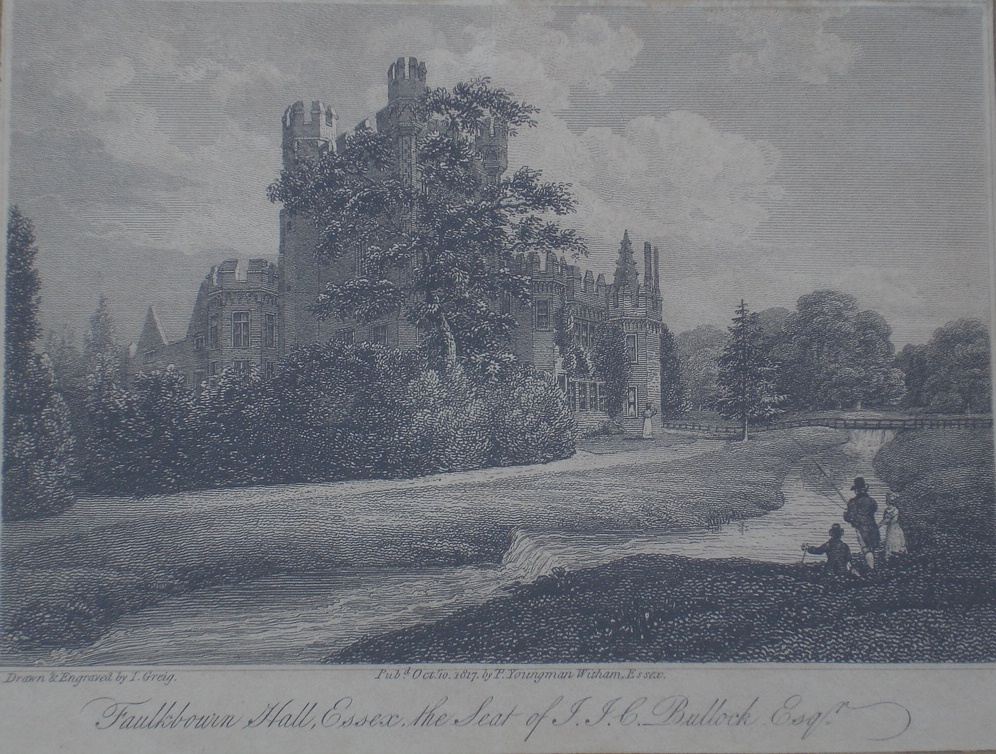
Faulkbourne Hall, 1817.

Sir Edward Bullock (c. 1580–1644) was the elder son of Edward Bullock of Wigborough and Loftes in Great Totham. He was knighted by King James I and was a Royalist during the English Civil War. He acquired the manor of Faulkbourne in 1637 and made substantial alterations to Faulkbourne Hall, which remained the family seat until 1897. He married Elizabeth Wylde and is buried at the St Germanus' Church, Faulkbourne.

Throughout the 17th and 18th centuries, the family thrived through a series of marriages to wealthy heiresses.

Edward Bullock (1663–1705) was lord of seven manors and sat as a Member of Parliament for the County of Essex in 1698 and later for the Borough of Colchester in 1703.

He became Deputy Lieutenant of the County of Essex and High Sheriff of Essex in 1696 and 1703. Through his marriage to Elizabeth, elder daughter of Sir Mark Guyon of Coggeshall, large estates at Coggeshall, Maplestead and Finchingfield were inherited by the family. After Elizabeth's death, he married Mary, the daughter of Sir Josiah Child of Wanstead. Sir Josiah thoroughly opposed the marriage and left his daughter a mere £5 in his will "and no more because she hath married not only without my consent but expressly against my command and contrary to her own repeated promises and lette others learne by her example".

Through Sir Mark Guyon's younger daughter, Rachel, who married Edward's younger brother, John Bullock, the Guyon estates at Radwinter and Great Wigborough came into the family and passed by intestacy to Col. John Bullock.

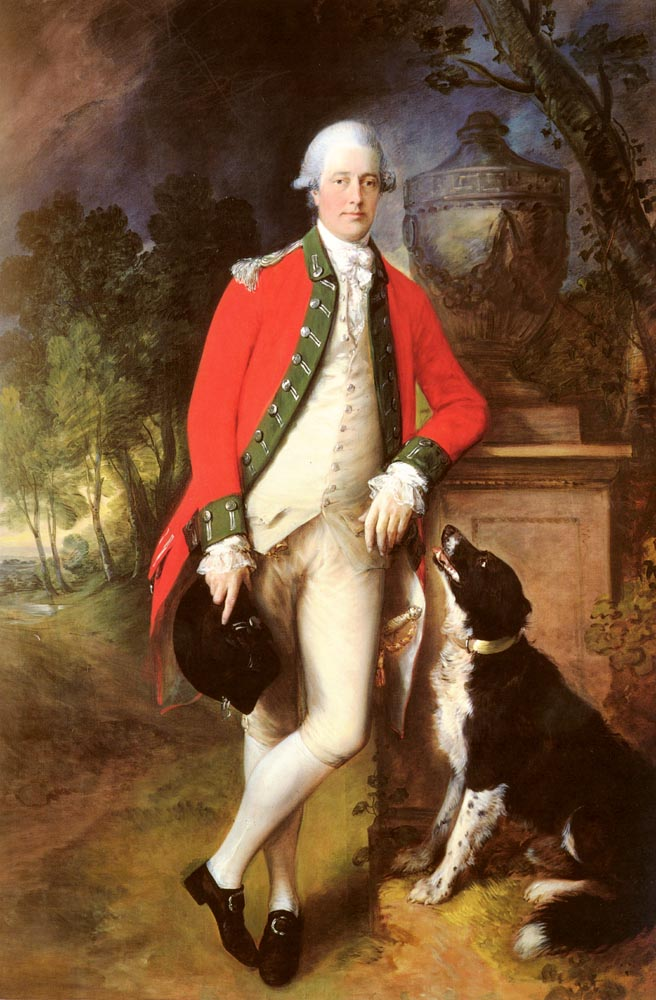
Col. John Bullock by Gainsborough

Edward and Mary's son, Josiah Bullock (1697–1752), attempted to follow his maternal grandfather's example and make his fortune in trade. He spent most of his life in London – in Highgate and the city – as a Royal Exchange Director and Hambro Merchant. Though a local Justice of the Peace and Deputy Lieutenant, he neglected his duties at Faulkbourne.

Josiah Bullock married Hannah, daughter of Sir Thomas Cooke, M.P. Their son, John, had his portrait painted by Thomas Gainsborough. He was a Colonel in the East Essex Militia. Educated at Clare Hall, Cambridge, at the age of 23 he embarked on a parliamentary career that lasted 56 years and culminated in him becoming Father of the House. He took a keen interest in Faulkbourne and undertook many improvements to the Hall and grounds. A patron of the arts, he founded a wide-ranging collection of pictures. Whilst his wife Elizabeth was heiress to large slum estates in Southwark (17 acres containing 400 houses), he exhausted a large part of her fortune on parliamentary life. She died in 1793 and they had no children. He left his estates on his death, in 1809, to Jonathan Josiah Christopher Watson, son of his elder sister, also named Elizabeth, who had married Jonathan Watson of Ringhall in Suffolk.

Jonathan Josiah Christopher Watson (1749–1832) succeeded to the Essex estates directly from his uncle in 1809 and, in the following year, took the surname Bullock, rather than Watson, under Royal Sign Manual, subject to some £24,000 of debt. He was a Major in the East Essex Militia.

His eldest son, also Jonathan (1773–1860), served in the 1st Dragoon Guards and as a Justice of the Peace, Deputy Lieutenant and, in 1837, High Sheriff of Essex. He did not marry an heiress but a daughter of the Vicar of Witham. His brother, John (1775–1844), became Rector of Radwinter and Faulkbourne and was the great-grandfather of Guy Bullock.

After Jonathan's death in 1860, the pressure of social and economic change in the 19th century brought the beginnings of the family's decline at Faulkbourne. Properties began to be sold when the Rev. Walter Trevelyan Bullock (1818–1878) inherited the estates, his three elder brothers having predeceased him, leaving only Faulkbourne and Radwinter in the family. He had been Rector of Faulkbourne until 1852 before moving to Devon, yet after only a year he returned to Faulkbourne on the death of his brother. He later lived mainly in London and, on a visit to Faulkbourne, accidentally poisoned himself and died in 1878. His sister, Margaret Emily Bullock (1822–1913), married the Rev. Hon. Llewellyn Charles Robert Irby, the youngest son of George Irby, 3rd Baron Boston.

Debrett's records that Walter Trevelyan's daughter, Edith Anne Bullock (died 1929), was the granddaughter-in-law of George Hamilton-Gordon, 4th Earl of Aberdeen, Prime Minister of the United Kingdom from 1852 to 1855.

Walter Trevelayan's eldest son, Walter Henry Bullock (1861–1924), was the last of the Faulkbourne senior male lineage. During his youth, his trustees carried out extensive repairs to the Hall but he was never permanently in residence there. In 1892 most of the tapestries and pictures, such as the fitted Aubusson tapestries and Gainsborough's portrait of Col. John Bullock, were sold.

Faulkbourne Hall and the surrounding estate were purchased in 1897 by Andrew Motion, who shortly thereafter sold them to Christopher William Oxley Parker.

== Twentieth century ==
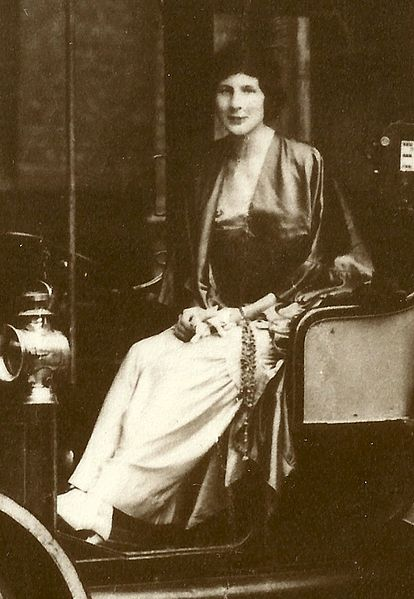
Lady Bullock was photographed at Cambridge where she and her cousin Olive Middleton (née Lupton) were guests at the First and Third Trinity Boat Club May Ball in 1914

Walter Henry Bullock died in 1924. His son, Henry Talbot Bouverie Bullock, had only a daughter. Therefore, the family line passed to Walter's brother, the Rev. Llewellyn Christopher Watson (1886–1936). He married Cecil Augusta Margaret Spearman, whose mother, Lady Maria Louisa Spearman (1837–1917), was the daughter of Thomas FitzMaurice, 5th Earl of Orkney, the great-nephew of the former prime minister William Petty-FitzMaurice, 1st Marquess of Landsdowne.

The line passed to their eldest son, Walter Llewellyn Bullock (1890–1944), an academic and promoter of Italian studies at the Universities of Chicago and Manchester, where he was Serena Professor of Italian.

The line then passed to Llewellyn's second son, Sir Christopher Bullock, K.C.B, C.B.E.(1891–1972), who served as Permanent Under-Secretary at the British Air Ministry from 1931 to 1936. Appointed at the age of 38, he remains one of the youngest civil servants to have headed a British government department. In 1917 he married Barbara May Lupton, the second cousin of Olive Middleton (née Lupton), great-grandmother of Catherine, Princess of Wales. It was reported in 2016 that "Olive Middleton volunteered as a nurse with her relative Lady Bullock" - a social science graduate - during World War I.

Sir Christopher was succeeded by his elder son, Richard Henry Watson Bullock C.B.,(1920–1998) who was Deputy Permanent Secretary at the Department of Trade and Industry and a consultant for Faulkbourn Consultancy Services.

Richard, in turn, was succeeded by his son, the actor and art historian Osmund Bullock, the current head of the family.

Sir Christopher's younger son, Edward Anthony Watson Bullock (1926–2015) served in the Foreign and Commonwealth Office and married Jenifer, elder daughter of Sir Richmond Palmer. Edward's elder son, Hugh Jonathan Watson Bullock, was appointed Commander of the Royal Victorian Order (CVO) in The King's 2025 New Year Honours.

== Emigration ==
The Rev. Llewellyn Christopher Watson Bullock's (1866–1936) younger brother, James Arthur Edward (1871–1934) enlisted with the Royal West Kent Regiment in 1892. In 1893 he married Rachel Anne Stevens in Hythe. There were 2 children of that marriage, Margaret Phyllis Myrtle Rachel (born 1893) and William Arthur Trevelyan (1895–1915). After service in Northern Ireland and the South Africa War, the regiment was deployed to Ceylon (now Sri Lanka) and then to Hong Kong where he was demobilised after distinguished service in 1907 with the Distinguished Conduct Medal and the Queen's and King's South Africa War Medals with the clasps “Witterbergen, Cape Colony and Transvaal”. He joined the Civil Service, was appointed MBE in 1919 and a Companion of the Imperial Service Order in 1924. He retired to England in 1928 and died in 1934.

William Arthur Trevelyan Bullock was born (1895) in Enniskillen, Northern Ireland and joined his father in Hong Kong when the family had settled there. He volunteered for the Hong Kong Volunteer Corps for 2 years before emigrating to New Zealand where he was employed on a sheep farm outside of Auckland. He volunteered for War Service in the New Zealand Expeditionary Force and joined the Auckland Infantry (Territorial) Regiment in January 1915. His Regiment landed as part of the combined attacks on Gallipoli on 25 April 1915 at ANZAC Cove, the key objective being to secure the higher ground of Chunuk Bair.

The attack failed and ANZAC troops dug in near the Cove for months of stalemate trench warfare in terrible conditions - the Turks being in strength and in good positions on higher ground. Illness was rampant and even drinking water was hard to come by in baking heat.

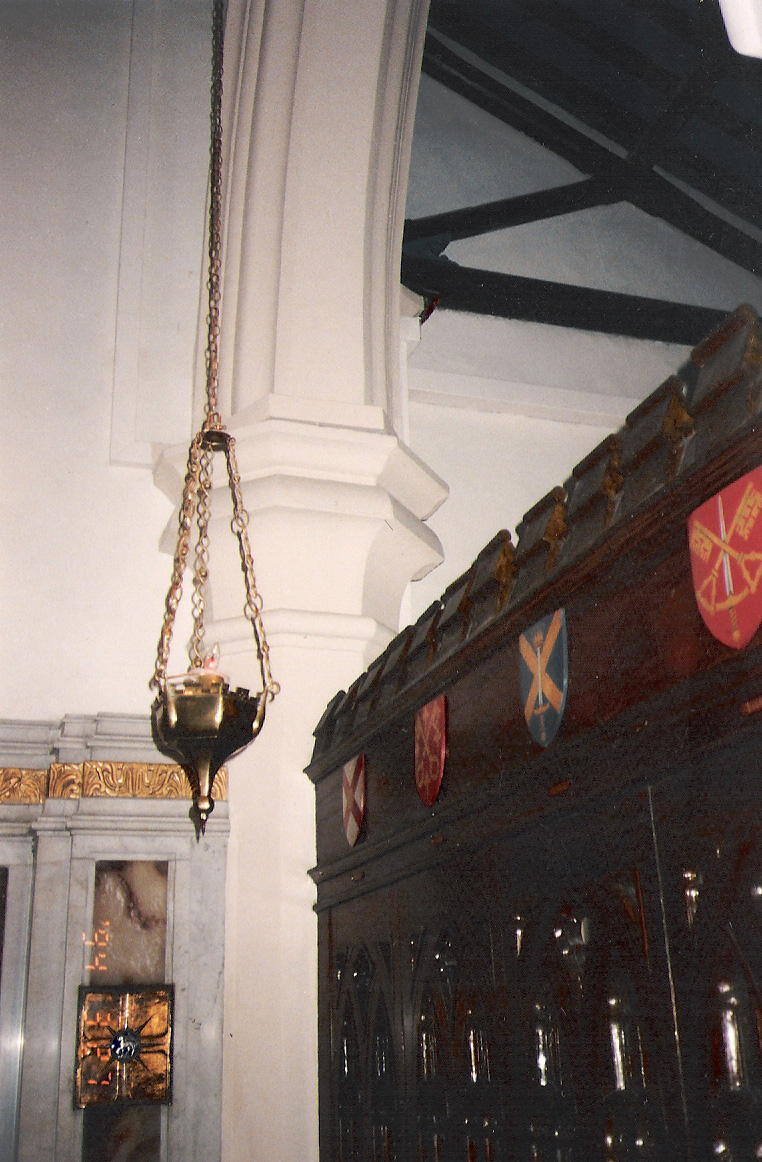
William Arthur Bullock In Memoriam Sanctuary lamp, St John's Cathedral, Hong Kong

A final ANZAC attack was attempted on 6 August. This entailed a breakout by the ANZACs to the north and then east around Turkish lines. This was to be combined with a new landing of Allied forces further to the north at Suvla Bay. William and the Auckland Regiment were sent out in the late afternoon of 6th. Their objective was to move up along Chailuk Dere to Rhododendron Spur and join there with other forces and fight up to take Chunuk Bair by dawn of 7th before attacking the Turks from behind down to Battleship Hill.

The terrain is awful; officers became lost in the dark; other forces were late for the rendezvous; there were delays and the night attack failed.

A further ANZAC attack made on the 8th also failed and the Turks counterattacked during which William was killed.

Private William Arthur Trevelyan Bullock (Service Number 12/1907) is remembered at the Chunuk Bair (New Zealand) Memorial and, in his memory, his father donated a Sanctuary Lamp that hangs by the Lady Chapel in St John's Cathedral, Hong Kong. He was posthumously awarded the Victory Medal.

After James Arthur's first wife, Rachel Stevens died in 1907, aged 32, he married Helen Wilks in 1914 with whom he had two children, a son Edward John (1916–1982), who married Florence Gwendolen Crosthwaite (1909- 2002), and a daughter Stella Mary (1919–2005), who married George Cross (1920–1990).

== Senior male lineage ==
- Osmund Bulloc of Edbergefeld (Aborfield); living in 1166 and 1190
- Richard Bulloc of Erbergfeld; living in 1222
- Gilbert Bulloc of Erbergfeld and Sunning; living in 1250
- Robert Bullok, Lord of Erburghfeld; returned as man at arms in 1324; living in 1331, 1336 and 1345
- Robert Bullok of Herburghfield; living in 1341
- Robert Bullock (died 1405), Lord of Herburghfield and Hurst, esquire; living in 1382 (no male issue – line passed to uncle)
- Gilbert Bullok of Barkham; living in 1336 and 1383
- Robert Bullock, possibly of Barkham
- Thomas Bullock of Aberfield; living in 1439 and 1464
- Robert Bullock of Aberfield; living in 1478; Commissioner for the Conservancy of the River Thames
- Gilbert Bullock (died 1500) of Aberfield
- Thomas Bullock (died 1558) of Arberfield
- Richard Bullock (d 1570) of Aberfield
- Thomas Bullock (1546–1595) of Aberfield (no issue - line passed to brother)
- William Bullock of Stratfield Mortimer; living in 1565
- John Bullock (died 1595) of Mulsham, Wigborough Magna and Loftes of Great and Little Totham
- Edward Bullock (d. 10 February 1596) of Wigborough and Loftes
- Sir Edward Bullock (c. 1580 - 1644) of Loftes and Faulkbourne
- Edward Bullock of Faulkbourne; living 1612
- Edward Bullock (died 1671) of Faulkbourne
- Edward Bullock (1663–1705) of Faulkbourne
- Josiah Bullock (1697–1752) of Faulkbourne and Mincing Lane
- Col. John Bullock (1731–1809) of Faulkbourne
- Elizabeth Bullock (1725–1763), married Jonathan Watson
- Jonathan Josiah Christopher Watson (1749–1832), took the surname Bullock by Royal Licence in 1810
- Jonathan Bullock (19 October 1773 – 29 September 1860) of Faulkbourne
- Rev. Walter Trevelyan Bullock (1818-17 June 1878) of Faulkbourne
- Walter Henry Bullock (29 May 1861 – 23 March 1924) of Faulkbourne, later of Radwinter and Islip
- Henry Talbot Bouverie Bullock (19 September 1886 – 1980) (no male issue - line passed to uncle)
- Rev. Llewellyn Christopher Watson Bullock (29 August 1866 – 1936)
- Walter Llewellyn Bullock (7 March 1890 – 19 February 1944) (line passed to only surviving brother)
- Sir Christopher Llewellyn Bullock (10 November 1891 – 16 May 1972)
- Richard Henry Watson Bullock (12 November 1920 – 14 July 1998)
- Osmund Bullock (b. 25 July 1951)
