= Dudley Fortescue (MP for Sudbury) =

Dudley Fortescue (died 1604), of Faulkbourne, Essex, was an English Member of Parliament (MP).

The son of the politician Henry Fortescue, Dudley was a Member of the Parliament of England for Sudbury in 1593. In September 1604 he hanged himself at Blunt's Hall in Little Wratting. As his death was caused by suicide, his property and goods were forfeit to the crown. King James awarded his goods to Margaret Hartsyde, a chamberer servant of Anne of Denmark, and the Privy Council wrote to Sir Nicholas Bacon to make sure she got full benefit.
