= William Bullock (cricketer) =

English cricketer, journalist, and military historian

Personal information
- Full name: William Henry Bullock
- Born: 5 April 1837; Faulkbourne, Essex, England
- Died: 21 April 1904 (aged 67); Saint-Raphaël, Var, France
- Batting: Unknown
- Role: Wicket-keeper

Domestic team information
- Years: Team
- 1857–1860: Oxford University

Career statistics
Competition	First-class
Matches	5
Runs scored	207
Batting average	29.57
100s/50s	–/1
Top score	78
Catches/stumpings	2/–
- Source: Cricinfo, 20 January 2020

William Henry (Bullock) Hall DL JP (5 April 1837 – 21 April 1904) was an English first-class cricketer, journalist and military historian.

== Family and early life ==
The son of Henry Robert Bullock, he was born into the Bullock family at Faulkbourne, Essex in April 1837. He was educated at Rugby School, before attending Balliol College, Oxford where he studied classical moderations.

== Cricketer ==
While studying at Oxford, he played first-class cricket for Oxford University, making his debut against the Marylebone Cricket Club at Oxford in 1857. He made four further first-class appearances for Oxford, with a further appearance in 1857 followed by two in 1858 and one in 1859. Bullock scored 207 runs in his five matches, with an average of 29.57 and with a high score of 78.

== Journalist ==
After he graduated from Oxford, he was a member of Lincoln's Inn but did not become a barrister and instead traveled to Italy, Egypt and the Holy Land. He then chose to become a journalist in the employment of The Daily News.

=== Poland ===
He was the newspaper's special correspondent and reported on the Polish Insurrection in 1863–1864 following which he wrote a book, Polish Experiences, published by Macmillan in 1864. His hosts, during his travels, included the Tarnowski family. Bullock described visiting the family seat at Dzików Castle where he met Count Jan Tarnowski and his two brothers, Juliusz Tarnowski and Stanisław Tarnowski. Juliusz was killed 2 weeks later fighting the Russians whilst Stanisław was condemned by the Austrians to 12–years solitary confinement in the Wawel Castle. Some months later, as Bullock returned from his wider travels back to Kraków, he sought permission to visit Stanisław in prison. Although permission was formally granted, access was denied on the morning of his visit.

=== Other assignments ===
He also covered the Second French intervention in Mexico in 1864–65, writing Across Mexico in 1864-5, and represented the paper in Rome from 1866 to 1867. He became an ardent partisan of the Italian Revolutionary movement fighting with Garibaldi from whom he received personal thanks. He was dispatched to Sedan during the Franco-Prussian War in 1870, where he was the chief manager of the French Peasant Relief Fund while based in France for which he was created Chevalier of Légion d'honneur.

== Philanthropy ==
Bullock was keenly interested in movements of practical philanthropy: encouraging fruit growing in Ireland by free gifts of trees, building improved dwellings in the slums of the East End of London and erecting model cottages for those working on his estates.

== Later life ==
He changed his surname in 1872, assuming the name Hall, in lieu of Bullock, on the inheritance of the Cambridgeshire estates of his uncle, General John Hall of Weston Colville and Six Mile Bottom. He was also a military historian, writing books on the subject. Having served as a deputy lieutenant and justice of the peace for Cambridgeshire, he later served as the High Sheriff of Cambridgeshire and Huntingdonshire in 1891. He was resident at Six Mile Bottom in Cambridgeshire and also had a villa at Valscure in France at Saint-Raphaël, where he died in April 1904 after a short illness resulting from paralysis.
