= Henry Fortescue (MP, died 1576) =

English politician

Henry Fortescue (by 1515 – 1576), of Faulkbourne, Essex, was an English politician.

He was a member (MP) of the parliament of England for Maldon in March 1553 and for Sudbury in 1559, and High Sheriff of Essex and Hertfordshire in 1563.

He was the father of the politician Dudley Fortescue.
