= St Germanus' Church, Faulkbourne =

Church in Faulkbourne, Essex, England

Coordinates: 51°49′08″N 0°36′38″E

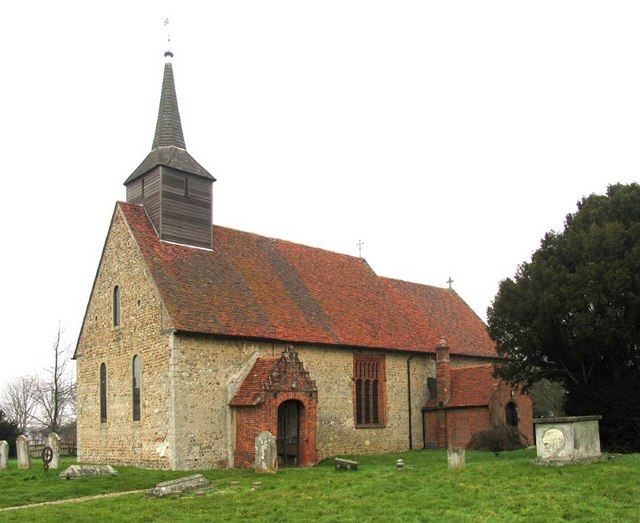
St Germanus, Faulkbourne

St Germanus' Church is an active Church of England church in the village of Faulkbourne in Essex, England. Much of the existing church dates to the 12th and 13th centuries. It has been Grade I listed since 1967.

The church is dedicated to Saint Germanus, a bishop of Auxerre in Late Antique Gaul, who visited Britain to suppress the Pelagian heresy in about 429. The church may have been dedicated to Saint Germanus because it was consecrated on his feast day, 31 July.

== History ==
The original Norman church, dating from the 12th century, was extended in the 13th century and restored in the 19th century. Its walls are constructed mainly of flint rubble and Roman brick, with red-clay tiles on the roof. It has a timber-framed bell turret and spire, with a red-brick porch and vestry, both attached to the south wall.

In late 1886, the church was restored by the architect Arthur Blomfield at a cost of £800. A service was held on 21 October 1886 to mark the reopening of the church following its restoration, with the sermon delivered by the Rt. Rev. Thomas Legh Claughton, Bishop of St Albans.

The church contains a number of memorials to the Bullock family, who owned Faulkbourne Hall from 1637 to 1897.

== Parish ==
Today the parish is part of the Witham and Villages benefice.

== Partial list of rectors ==
...
Rev. John Harrison (1746–1798)
Rev. John Watson (1798–1818)
Rev. John Bullock (1818–1845)
Rev. Robert Burdett Burgess (1845–1847)
Rev. Walter Trevelyan Bullock (1847–1853)
Rev. Frederick Spurrell (1853–1898)
...
Rev. Canon Francis William Galpin (1921–1933)
...
Rev. John Michael Hall (1993–2013)
