= Faulkbourne Hall =

Country house in Essex, England

Coordinates: 51.8175°N 0.6140°E

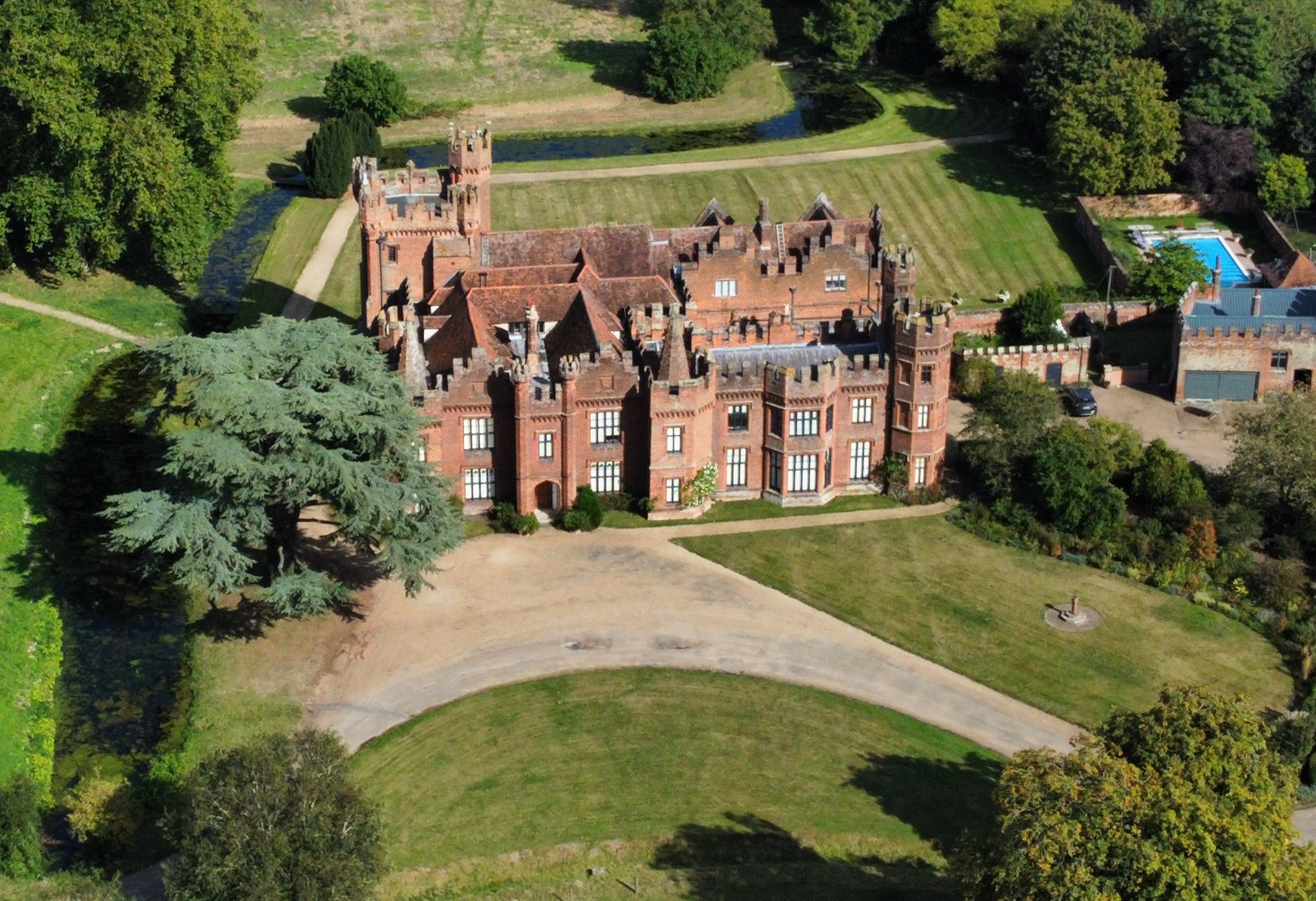
- Interactive map of the Faulkbourne Hall area

General information
- Location: Faulkbourne, Essex, England, United Kingdom
- Year built: c. 1439

Faulkbourne Hall is a manor house in the village of Faulkbourne in Essex. The hall has been a Grade I listed building since 1953, and its gardens have been Grade II listed since 1987.

== Description ==
Faulkbourne Hall is a 15th century Manor House, built primarily of red brick in English bond. The roof is composed of handmade red clay tiles. The building features defensive features such as crenellations and two turrets, however these were "designed to impress" and the building was never intended to be defensible. The west front was an 1832 extension.

== History ==
Faulkborne Hall is the centre of the manor of Faulkbourne, first recorded under Edward the Confessor. A timber framed house was present on the current site from the early 15th century, and was partially incorporated into the present building.

By 1426, the land had come into the ownership of Sir John Montgomery, a prominent soldier and the brother-in-law of Sir Ralph Boteler. Montgomery petitioned for – and received – a licence to crenellate from Henry VI on 11 October 1439. The present brick building was built as a fortified house, as was popular fashion amongst the nobility at the time, and to celebrate Montgomery's successful campaigning in France. The manor was visited by Henry VII in 1489, at which point it was owned by Sir John's son, Sir Thomas Montgomery.

Ownership passed out of the Montgomery family on Sir Thomas' death in 1495, eventually passing to Sir Francis Bryan through his marriage to Sir Thomas' great-niece, Philippa Spice. Philippa's descendants from her first marriage owned the manor under Henry Fortescue sold it to Sir Edward Bullock in 1637.

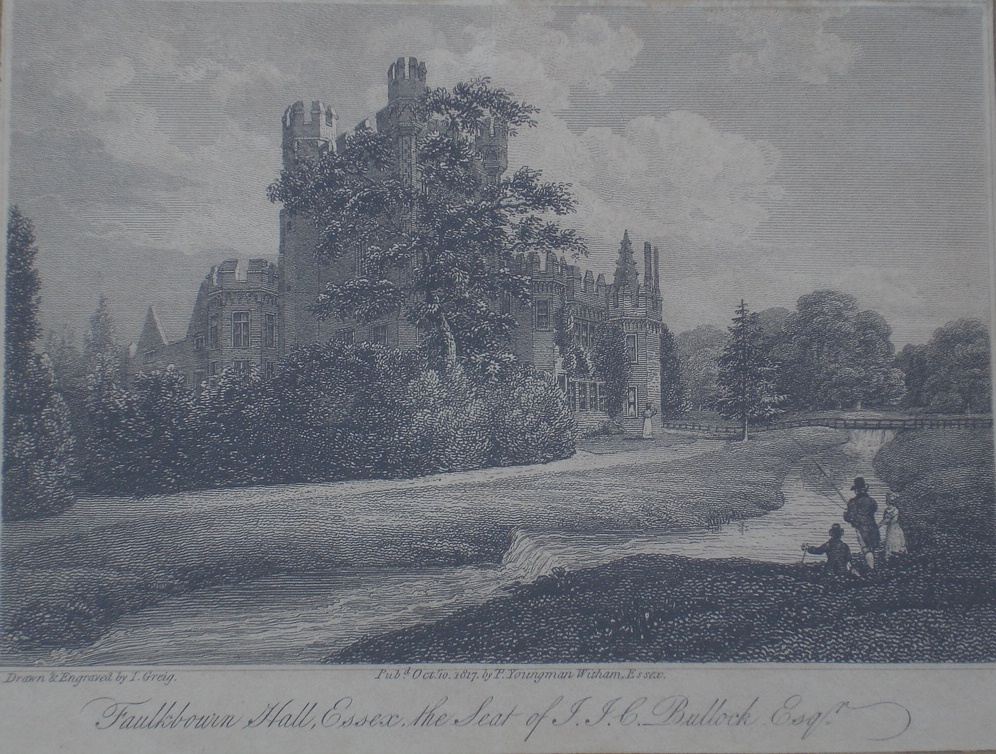
A drawing of Faulkbourne Hall in 1817, prior to the addition of the west front in 1837.

From 1637 to 1897, Faulkbourne Hall was owned by the Bullock family. In the 18th century, the family expanded the estate with stables, a kitchen garden, and park. In 1832, the present facade of the hall was completed with the addition of the west front.

The estate was purchased by Christopher Parker in 1897. His successors own the site to this day.

== See also ==
- Sir Francis Bryan
- Bullock family
- Sir Edward Bullock
- Colonel John Bullock
