= Sir Edward Bullock =

English landowner (c.1580–1644)

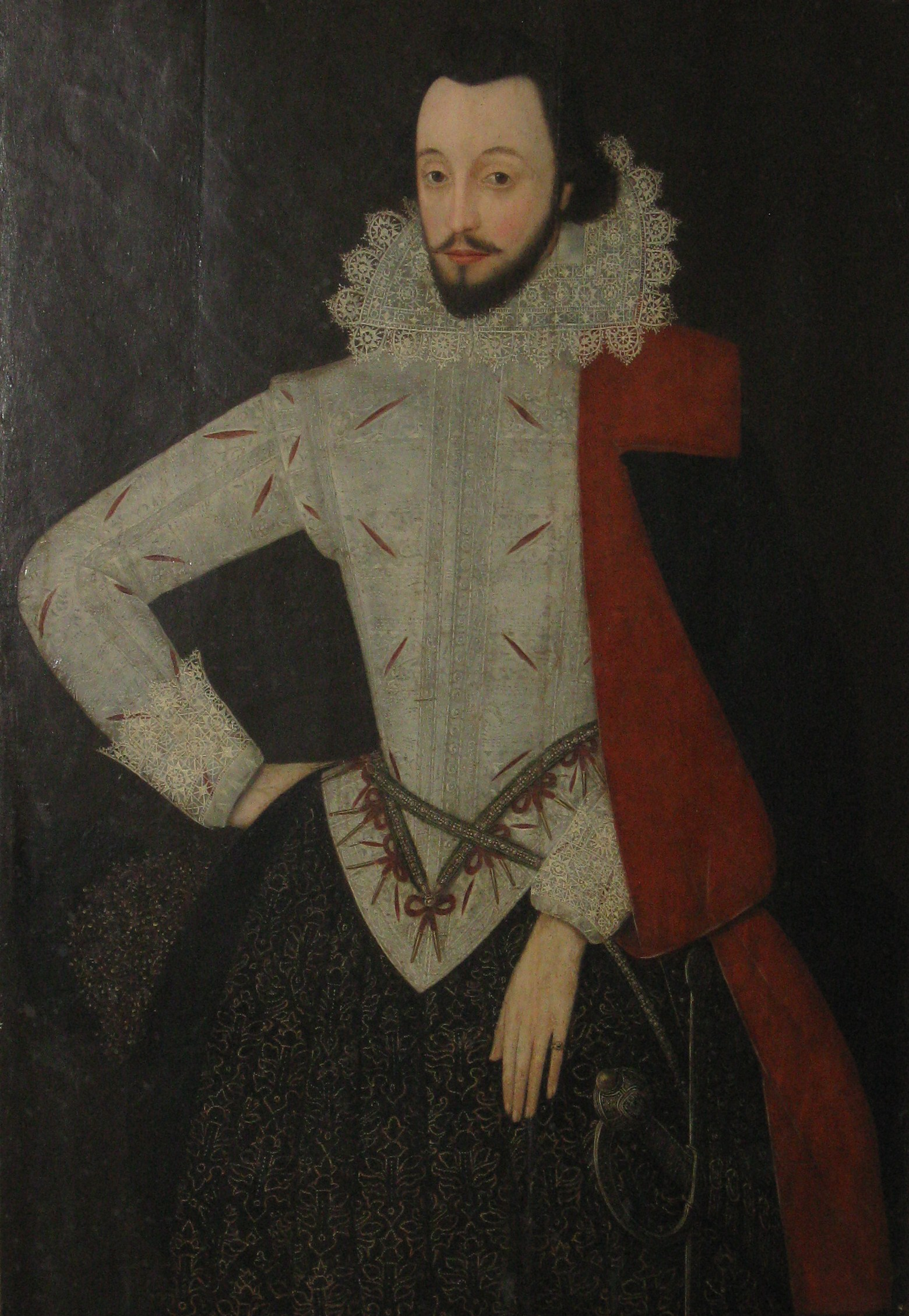
Sir Edward Bullock c. 1610

Sir Edward Bullock of Faulkbourne (c.1580–1644) was an English landowner who was knighted by King James I. He was a prominent member of the Bullock family and the owner of Faulkbourne Hall in Essex.

== Life ==
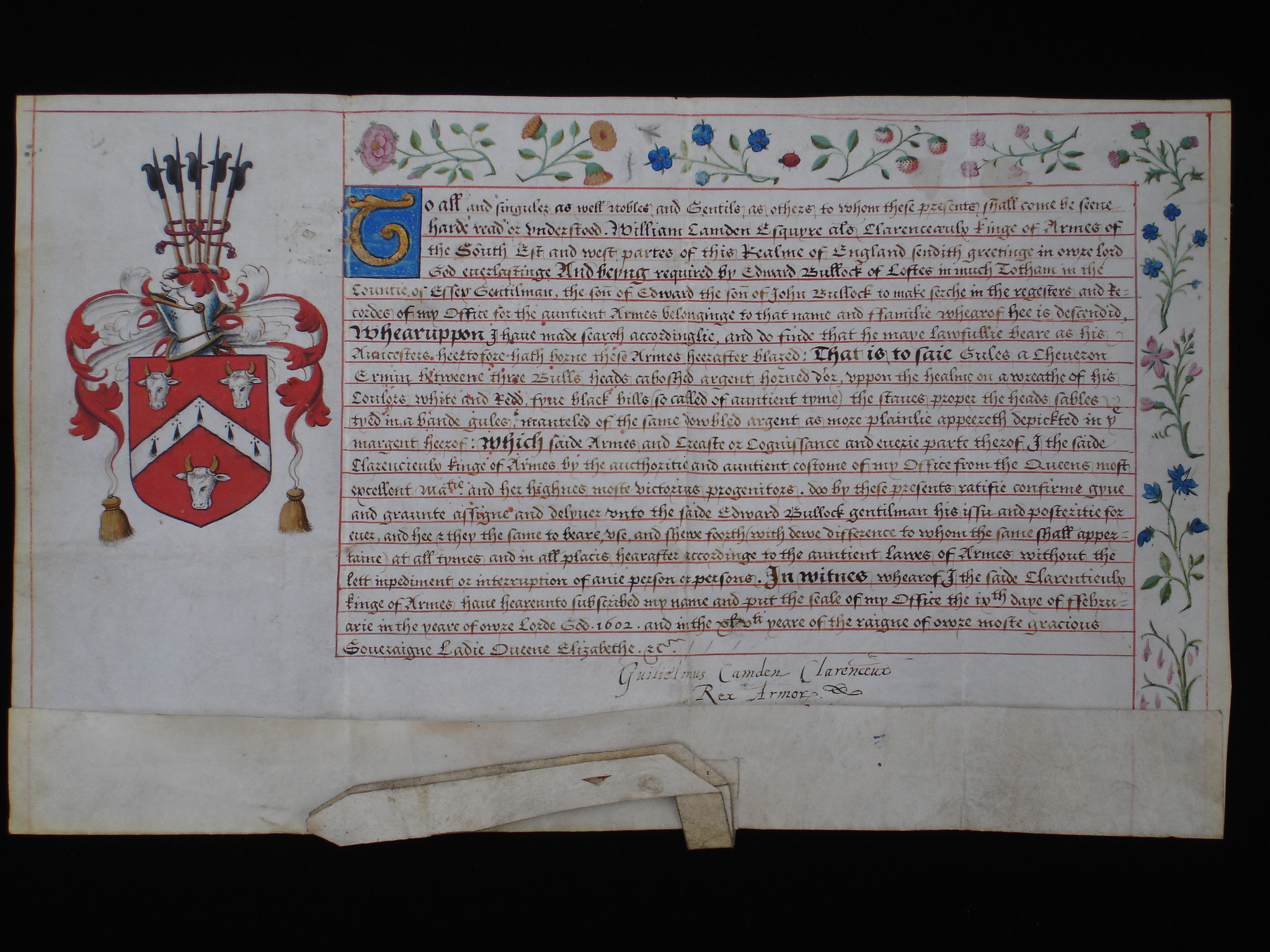
Confirmation of arms to Sir Edward Bullock 1602

Born about 1580, he was the elder son of Edward Bullock of Wigborough and Loftes in Great Totham and Joan Collen of High Laver, Essex.

In 1602, Bullock obtained from William Camden, the Clarenceux King of Arms, a "confirmation" of the arms of the Bullocks of Aborfield with due difference to mark his descent from a younger son. On 3 July 1609 he was knighted by King James I at Richmond Palace. From 1613 to 1618, he was Captain of Militia for the Maldon Hundred.

In the early days of the reign of King Charles I, he was appointed a Forced "Loan" Collector for the County of Norfolk whilst living in Pentney (c. 1622-1631). His accounts, which were returned on 12 June 1627, show that as a result of his commission he paid the sum of £1,200 into the Royal Exchequer. The deeply unpopular loans hastened the rupture between the King and Parliament.

In 1630, Bullock sought to take land from his neighbours in Norfolk by force and, after his prosecution in 1633 before the Star Chamber, he was imprisoned in London.

He was free by 1635 and trying to live in London - perhaps in Clerkenwell where his widow lived after his death - when he became one of the many "divers Persons of Quality" prosecuted in the Star Chamber for "residing in Town contrary to the King’s Proclamation", having ignored the King's decree of 1632 to leave London and return to their country estates and local governmental duties. The intention of the proclamation was to ensure that the nobility and gentry executed their local responsibilities. The unpopularity of the directive can be judged by the number of individuals who applied for "special dispensation licences" and the prosecutions in the Star Chamber for non-compliance.

== Faulkbourne ==
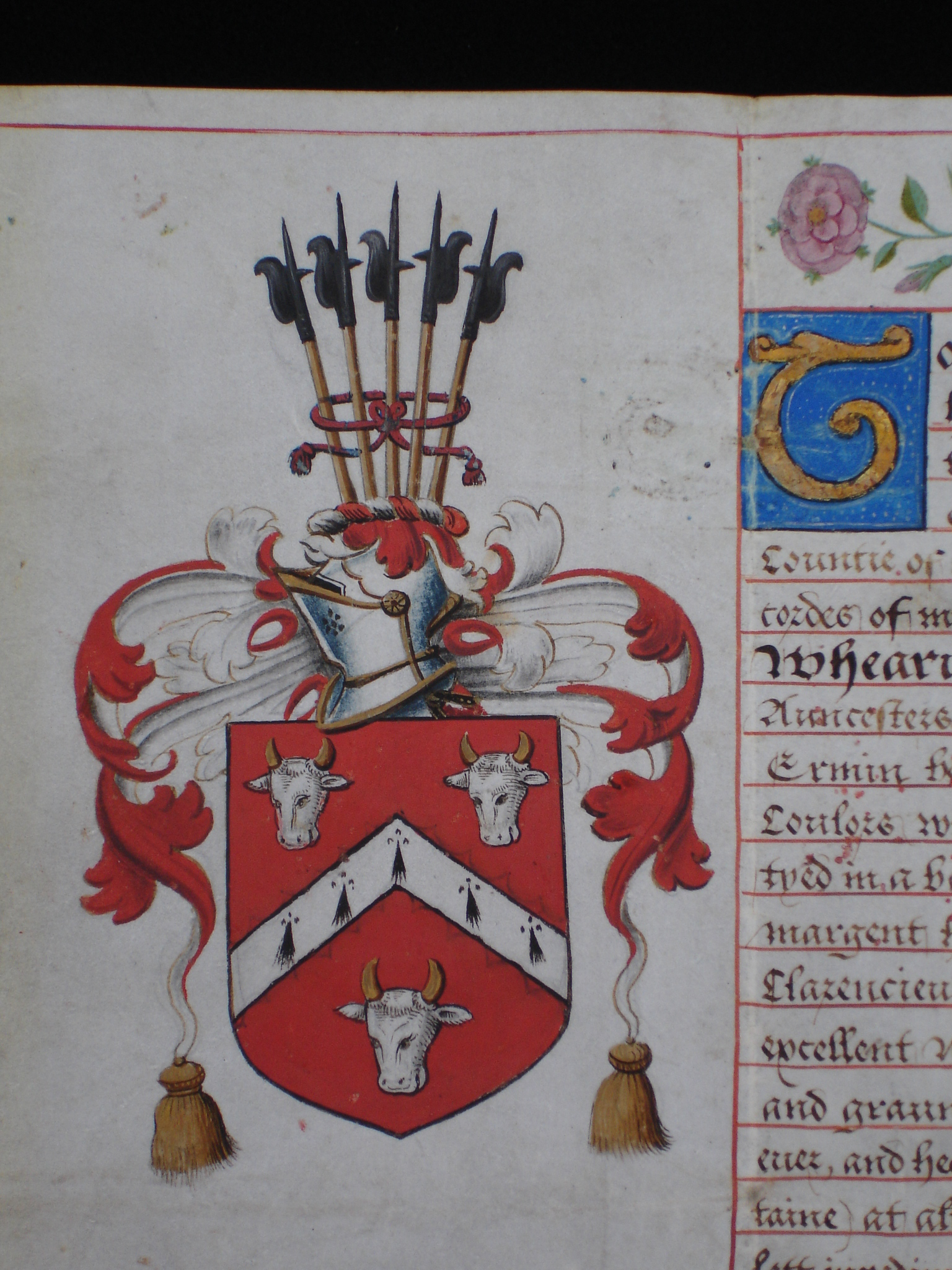
Bullock arms 1602

Bullock resided at Loftes for much of his life until 1637, when he purchased the manor and estate of Faulkbourne. From 1637 to 1897, Faulkbourne Hall was the family seat.

== English Civil War and death ==
As the English Civil War approached, a man named William Poe petitioned Parliament in May 1642 as a distressed prisoner against an unjust sentence of the Star Chamber following a suit against him taken by Bullock. He argued that, although the Star Chamber had been abolished, Bullock had collaborated with the Warden of Fleet Prison to prevent his discharge. Poe offered his services to Parliament, having previously been a commander in Ireland, where he had lost all his estates. Poe was discharged by Parliament and joined the Parliamentary Army as a Captain active in Suffolk and in Oliver Cromwell's own regiment. He is reported as being active in Essex, which may explain why Bullock fell foul of the Parliamentarians as a result of Poe's connections with them

Although Bullock was not active in the War, his family was strongly Royalist, and therefore when the war ended in 1644 he was fined £300 by the Parliamentary Commission. Owing to his death in the same year, the liability devolved onto his son, to whom, after proceedings lasting nine years, two-thirds of the original fine were ultimately remitted.

On his death in 1644, Bullock was buried at St Germanus' Church, Faulkbourne. His public and social duties resulted in heavy expenditure so that on his death the outlying estates of Loftes, Little Mapelstead and Finchingfield, amongst others, were sold. His widow went to live in Clerkenwell, where on 22 March 1644 a party of soldiers attacked her house and robbed her of gold and jewelry.

== Family ==
Bullock married Elizabeth, daughter and heir of Thomas Wylde of Glazeley Hall, Shropshire, and Kempsey, Worcestershire, and sister of Sir Edmund Wylde. Edward and Elizabeth had one son, also named Edward, who married Mary, daughter of Sir William de Grey of Marton Hall, Norfolk, and Anne Calthorpe.

== See also ==
- Bullock family
- Faulkbourne Hall
