= Christopher Bullock (civil servant) =

British civil servant (1891–1972)

Sir Christopher Bullock KCB, CBE

Permanent Under-Secretary of State for Air
- In office 1931–1936
- Preceded by: Sir Walter Nicholson
- Succeeded by: Sir Donald Banks

Personal details
- Born: 10 November 1891
- Died: 16 May 1972 (aged 80)
- Spouse: Barbara May Lupton
- Children: 2

Sir Christopher Llewellyn Bullock, KCB, CBE (10 November 1891 – 16 May 1972) was a prominent member of the Bullock family. He was appointed by Prime Minister Ramsay MacDonald as Permanent Under-Secretary at the British Air Ministry in 1930; at the age of 38, he remains one of the youngest civil servants to have headed a British government department. His work as Permanent Under-Secretary has been credited as responsible for Britain's victory in the Battle of Britain and thus survival in the Second World War.

After a report by a Board of Inquiry found he had abused his position as head of the ministry to seek a place on the board of Imperial Airways at a time when his ministry was negotiating with the company to establish an air mail service, he was dismissed by Prime Minister Stanley Baldwin in 1936, making him the only Permanent Under-Secretary ever known to have been dismissed from the civil service.

Soon after, opinion within the government began to change and Baldwin stated that "if I had had the full evidence before me which has now been made available, I should not have taken the decision I reluctantly did". After Bullock's death in 1972, public acknowledgement was given to the regret of his dismissal.

News reports in 2012 revealed that Bullock is a cousin-in-law to Catherine, Princess of Wales.

== Early years ==
Bullock was born on 10 November 1891 in Whiston, Northamptonshire, the son of Rev. Llewellyn Christopher Watson Bullock (1866–1936) and his wife, Cecil Augusta Margaret Isabella (née Spearman, 1869–1959), granddaughter of Thomas FitzMaurice, 5th Earl of Orkney. He gained a classical scholarship from Rugby School, where his father was a teacher, to Trinity College, Cambridge, from which he graduated in the first division of the first class of the Classical Tripos in 1913, twice winning a Browne medal, and was offered a fellowship at Trinity. Bullock was elected a member of the First Trinity Boat Club on 19 Oct 1910, and was cox for the 3rd boat in the Lent 1911 races, while Hugh Ralph Lupton was elected as a member on 22 Oct 1912. Bullock, Hugh Lupton and Hugh's first cousin, Lionel Martineau Lupton, were all at Trinity together in the 1912–13 year. Lionel Lupton was the brother of Olive Middleton; the siblings' second cousin was Barbara Lupton who had studied at Newnham College, Cambridge, alongside their sister Anne Lupton. Having met through their Cambridge rowing connections, Bullock and Barbara Lupton were married in London in 1917.

=== World War I ===
Following his Cambridge studies, Bullock took first place in the open competition for the Home and Indian Civil Services and in 1914, he chose India. However, at the outbreak of World War I, he volunteered for service with the Rifle Brigade Special Service. He was one of three officers (and 175 men) of the battalion wounded on 6 July 1915 during a major attack by the 11th Infantry Brigade on the German trenches near the small Flanders village of Boesinghe (Boezinge), about three miles north of Ypres, following the Second Battle of Ypres. He was seriously wounded and mentioned in dispatches.

== Role in British aviation ==
Returning to active service, Bullock was seconded to the Royal Flying Corps, training as an observer and then gaining his wings as a pilot in Egypt before being declared unfit for flying duties in 1917.

Bullock then joined the Air Staff, beginning his work for the Air Ministry, and was appointed Officer of the British Empire in 1919 with promotion to Commander in 1926. He was subsequently appointed Commander of the Bath in 1929 with promotion to Knight Commander in 1932.

=== Royal Air Force ===
In 1919, Bullock became principal private secretary to Winston Churchill, then Secretary of State for Air. From then on until 1930, he served successive Secretaries of State including Sir Samuel Hoare and The Lord Thomson, fighting with Lord Trenchard, as Trenchard's right-hand man on the civilian side, against resistance and powerful forces within Whitehall and the hostility of the Navy and the Army to the establishment of a permanent independent Royal Air Force.

On 12 June 1930, the prime minister, Ramsay MacDonald, agreed to Bullock's appointment as Permanent Under-Secretary at the age of 38. He remains one of the youngest civil servants to have headed a British government department.

During the 1930s, he worked with great determination under considerable pressure on the expansion of the RAF during the period in which the menace of Nazism rose in Germany. Bullock was personally committed to the policy of expansion and strove, against the pacific temper of the time, to awaken public and Parliament to the need to strengthen the RAF to meet the dangers that lay ahead. Even when Churchill was not in government during the 1930s, Bullock supplied him with figures on German air strength which Churchill used in attacking the government's policy of appeasement. His supporters included T. E. Lawrence, who wrote in 1934, "Bullock is doing well. I wish he was C.A.S. (Chief of the Air Staff) and the Air Council as well!" His achievements have been justly recognised in the accounts of rearmament and the role of the RAF during the Second World War.

Described as "a man of brilliant youthful academic achievement and manic self regard", and by Trenchard as "the man with the finest brain I ever met with" and one of his own chief advisers, Bullock made powerful enemies – "but not in the Air Ministry!" – as he sought to impose his views of the emerging power of the aeroplane on the Armed Forces and the government. Among those who took against him was Sir Warren Fisher, the Head of the Civil Service, who was notorious for his wish to control senior appointments in the civil service and to second-guess defence policy.

Bullock's foundations laid for the vast expansion of the RAF partly ensured Britain's survival of the Second World War. Of all the civil servants known by Lord Hankey, Secretary of the Cabinet, Bullock stood amongst the greatest creative contributors to the home defence effort.

=== Civil aviation ===
Bullock also made a great impact on the extension of British Civil Aviation through his support for Imperial Airways and by his part in creating the Empire Air Mail Scheme, in which he went as a passenger in one of the early proving flights to India in December 1926. Bullock accompanied the Air Minister on the inaugural scheduled air mail and passenger flight from Croydon to India with Air Vice-Marshal Sir Vyell Vyvyan aboard the Argosy City of Glasgow. He negotiated overflight and landing rights with South Africa and other African administrations, Australia and India.

In 1929, he participated in early test flights of the government funded airship, R101, part of the Imperial Airship Scheme. He was instrumental in persuading the Secretary of State for Air, Christopher Birdwood Thomson, 1st Baron Thomson – an enthusiastic proponent of airships – to delay the construction of a larger and more expensive airship, R102 (which would have cost over £2m at contemporary prices), until R101 had successfully completed its maiden flight to India. In the event Bullock's caution was justified. R101 crashed only a few hours into its maiden flight, killing Lord Thomson and most of the crew. Shortly afterwards the government abandoned the Imperial Airship Scheme.

=== Dismissal ===
On 6 August 1936, Bullock was dismissed from his post by the prime minister, Stanley Baldwin, on the advice of Sir Warren Fisher, following the report of a Board of Inquiry into his dealings with Sir Eric Geddes, the Chairman of Imperial Airways. The board found that he had abused his position as head of the ministry to seek a place on the board of Imperial Airways, at a time when his ministry was negotiating with the company to establish an air mail service – he had "interlaced public negotiations entrusted to him with the advancement of his personal or private interests" but also that "he at no time appreciated the gravity or fully realised the true nature or possible consequences of what he was doing and we consider that his failure to do so goes far to explain, though it cannot excuse, what has occurred".

As far as is known, Bullock remains the only Permanent Under-Secretary to have been dismissed from the civil service.

After his dismissal, he received thousands of letters of support. His case was taken up in the United States by Time magazine, which wrote: "Thus Sir Christopher Bullock had his career broken last week without anything specific being brought out against him. Among British aviators, the view was that Sir Christopher is easily worth ten of the men who investigated and broke him." "The gentlemen of the Air Ministry recently manoeuvred Prime Minister Stanley Baldwin into dismissing the only one of its civil servants with a practical grasp of Britain's colossal problems in air rearmament, Sir Christopher Bullock."

"He has probably done more for the Air Force than any one man except Lord Trenchard, Sir Samuel Hoare and Sir John Salmond". It was said that Lord Swinton did not like Bullock and "had been pushed into pushing Sir Christopher Bullock out".

On leaving the Civil Service, Bullock went on to pursue a successful career in business, being appointed to the board of a number of public companies.

== Recognition ==
Sir Christopher Bullock's Memorial Service Address

Within the government doubts quickly began to be voiced about the justice of Bullock's treatment. Even his secretary of state and the prime minister in 1936, Baldwin, wrote letters admitting that their decision had been wrong. As former prime minister, Baldwin later wrote "I feel it only right to say that, if I had had the full evidence before me which has now been made available, I should not have taken the decision I reluctantly did". Writing in November 1937, Lord Hankey stated "the more I think about it the more I feel that the punishment did not fit the crime". In December 1938, the Marquess of Londonderry – the Secretary of State for Air at the time of the dismissal – wrote privately to Baldwin "[Bullock] was most unjustly treated and was the victim of the inveterate hatred of a civil servant Sir Warren Fisher who should never have been allowed to encompass his downfall, as he undoubtedly did."

In the spring of 1940, the injustice he had suffered was privately recognised when Bullock was offered the Headship of the Petroleum Warfare Department which would have been de facto reinstatement and full restitution. Bullock declined, arguing that he was more valuable to the war effort as an industrialist.

After the war, his case was reviewed by the Lord Chancellor, Lord Jowitt, who concluded that the case against Bullock would have met if he had been allowed to resign in 1936 as no corruption was alleged – "it was really a case in which his zeal had outrun his discretion". Nonetheless, Jowitt advised the Prime Minister Clement Attlee that he should not alter the decision "after all these years". Accordingly, Attlee wrote to confirm Jowitt's conclusions but Bullock did not regard this as adequate redress.

Viscount Templewood wrote, in 1957, "Whatever may have been the merits of the dispute in which he (Bullock) was then involved – and I may say that I took his side, and that none of the charges in any way affected his honour – the fact remains that by his departure the Air Force lost one of its ablest defenders".

Despite campaigning for many years, Bullock never secured the redress he desired and died in 1972 without any official statement being issued about his treatment.

Public acknowledgement that his dismissal had been mistaken was belatedly made after his death when his memorial service at the Central Church of the Royal Air Force, St Clement Danes was attended by representatives of the prime minister, (Victor Goodhew M.P.), Parliamentary Under-Secretary of State for Defence (RAF), (Lord Lambton M.P.), the Home Civil Service (Permanent Under Secretary of State for the Ministry of Defence, Sir James Dunnett) and the Air Force Board (Air Chief Marshal Sir Edmund Hudleston and Air Chief Marshal Sir Denis Smallwood). The Address was given by The Rt. Hon. Lord Geoffrey Lloyd M.P.

Sir William Armstrong, Head of the Civil Service at the time of Bullock's death, wrote of "a great personal tragedy which clouded the rest of his life", many considering that "his treatment had been unduly severe", there being "no doubt at any time about his great abilities".

== Family ==
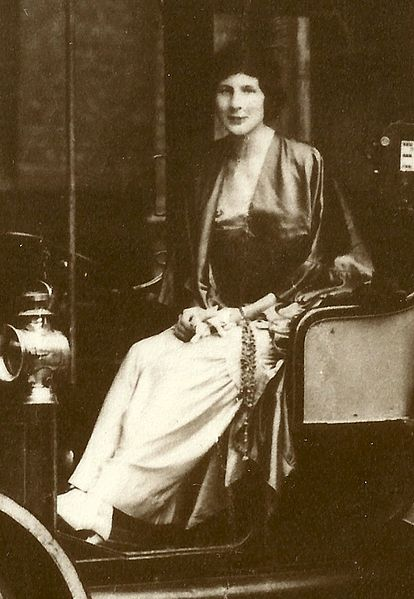
Lady Bullock (née Barbara Lupton) in 1914 at the University of Cambridge

Bullock's elder brother was Professor Walter Llewellyn Bullock. His youngest brother, pilot Osmund Fitzmaurice Bullock (1905–1933) – named after their grandmother Lady Maria Louisa FitzMaurice (1837–1917) – was killed in a plane crash on 2 October 1933; the accident occurring during Bullock's tenure as Permanent Under-Secretary for the Air Ministry.

On 18 April 1917, he married fellow Cambridge University alumni Barbara May Lupton (1891-1974) of Leeds at the main Unitarian church of West London, Essex Church, The Mall, Kensington. She had boarded at Bedales with whom she played cricket (batsman) in June 1909 against Prior's Field School which her second cousin, Anne Lupton had attended. Anne then studied at Newnham College, Cambridge (1908-1911) with Barbara joining her in 1910 and completing her studies in 1913. Barbara and another second cousin, Baroness Airedale, were guests at the 1935 London wedding of their relative Edith Cliff to Sir T. Willans Nussey.

Sir Christopher and Lady Bullock had two sons, Richard Henry Watson Bullock CB (1920–1998) and Edward Anthony Watson Bullock (1926–2015), both of whom entered public service, in the Home Civil Service and the Foreign and Commonwealth Office respectively. Edward's son, Hugh Jonathan Watson Bullock, was appointed Commander of the Royal Victorian Order (CVO) in The King's 2025 New Year Honours.

In 2012, new press coverage revealed that, through his wife Lady Bullock (née Barbara Lupton), Bullock was the second cousin-in-law thrice removed of the future Princess of Wales. The Princess's great-grandmother, Olive Middleton (née Lupton), was Lady Bullock's second cousin. In 1914, the two cousins were guests at the May Ball of Cambridge University's First and Third Trinity Boat Club of which Bullock was a member.

Government offices
Preceded by Sir Walter Nicholson	Permanent Secretary of the Air Ministry; 1931–1936	Succeeded by Sir Donald Banks
