= Concert for Diana =

Benefit concert in honour of Diana, Princess of Wales

Coordinates: 51.55601°N 0.27963°W

- Genre: Pop, rock
- Dates: 1 July 2007
- Locations: Wembley Stadium, London, United Kingdom
- Founders: Prince William; Prince Harry
- Website: www.concertfordiana.com (Archived)

Concert for Diana was a benefit concert held at the then newly built Wembley Stadium in London, United Kingdom in honour of Diana, Princess of Wales, on 1 July 2007, which would have been her 46th birthday. 31 August that year brought the 10th anniversary of her death. The concert was hosted by Diana's sons, Prince William and Prince Harry, who helped to organise many of the world's most famous entertainers and singers to perform. Proceeds from the concert went to Diana's charities, as well as to charities of which William and Harry are patrons.

The concert was broadcast in 140 countries with an estimated potential audience of 500 million. In December 2006, 22,500 tickets were made available for purchase for the concert, selling out in just 17 minutes. 63,000 people turned out to Wembley Stadium to watch the performances to commemorate Diana. At the end of the performances, a video montage of Diana as a child was presented, accompanied by the Queen song "These Are the Days of Our Lives".

The concert started at 16:00 BST and finished at approximately 22:15 BST – there were two short intermissions during the concert. A 2-Disc DVD set of the full concert was released on 5 November 2007. A Blu-ray high definition release of the full concert and documentary was released in November 2008.

== Planning ==
In pre-concert interview, Prince William listed Michael Jackson as one of Diana's most favourite music acts, but Jackson did not appear on the show.

In one of the many tabloid stories that surfaced relating to the concert and the following week's Live Earth event, it was alleged that Madonna, the Red Hot Chili Peppers, Keane, and other acts were set to play at the concert but were lost to Live Earth. The concert organisers were apparently trying to secure their top acts, and were also being pressured into rethinking their lineup to appeal to younger people, and compare to Live Earth.

Catherine Middleton, now Prince William's wife, and Chelsy Davy, the now ex-girlfriend of Prince Harry, attended the concert. It has been rumoured that they were involved in helping to plan the event.

Queen guitarist Brian May was expected to perform alongside Joss Stone in her version of "Under Pressure", but pulled out of accompanying after finding the new arrangement of his band's song "different... from the original".

== Timeline ==
- Order of performances

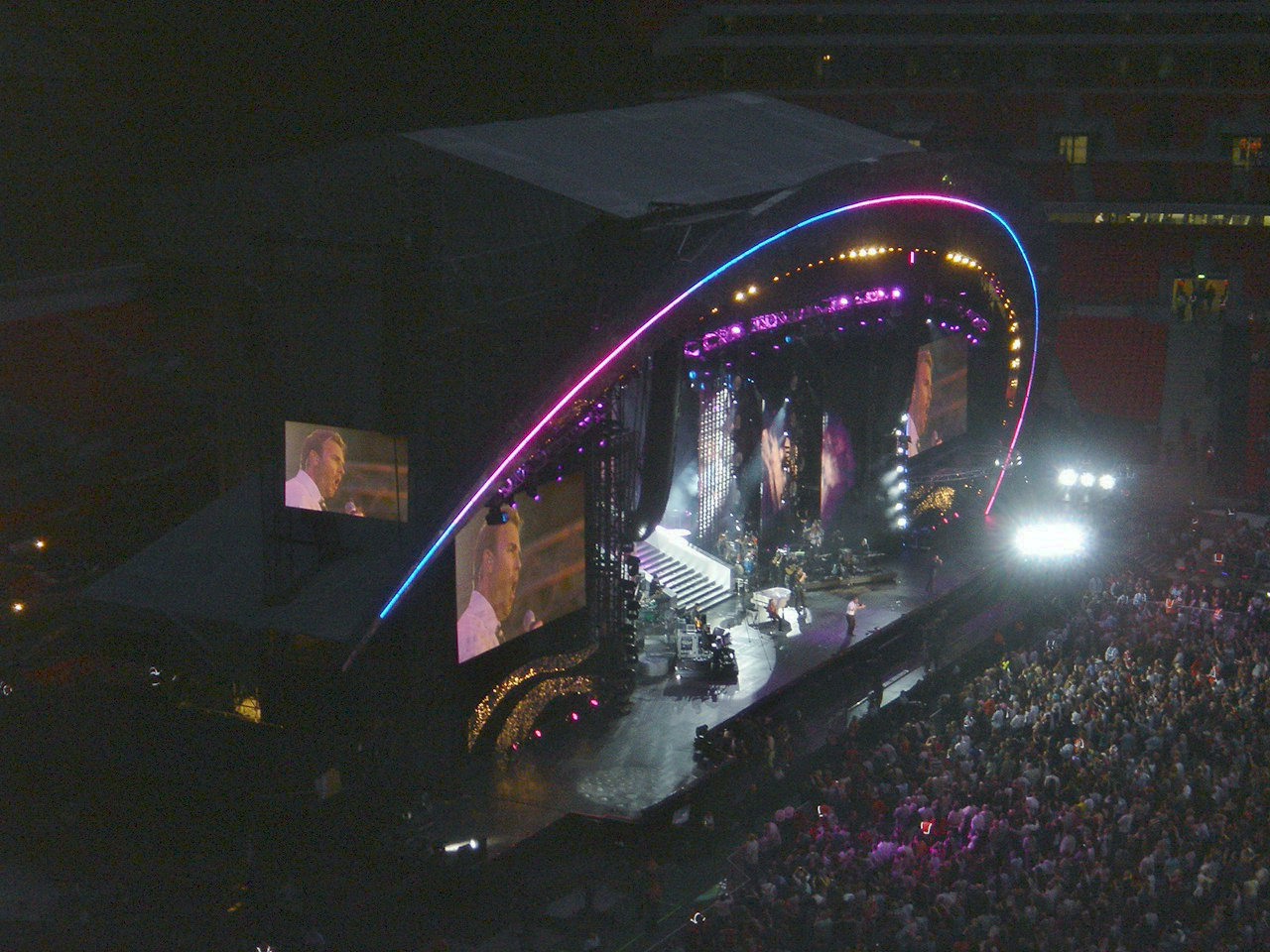
Take That performing

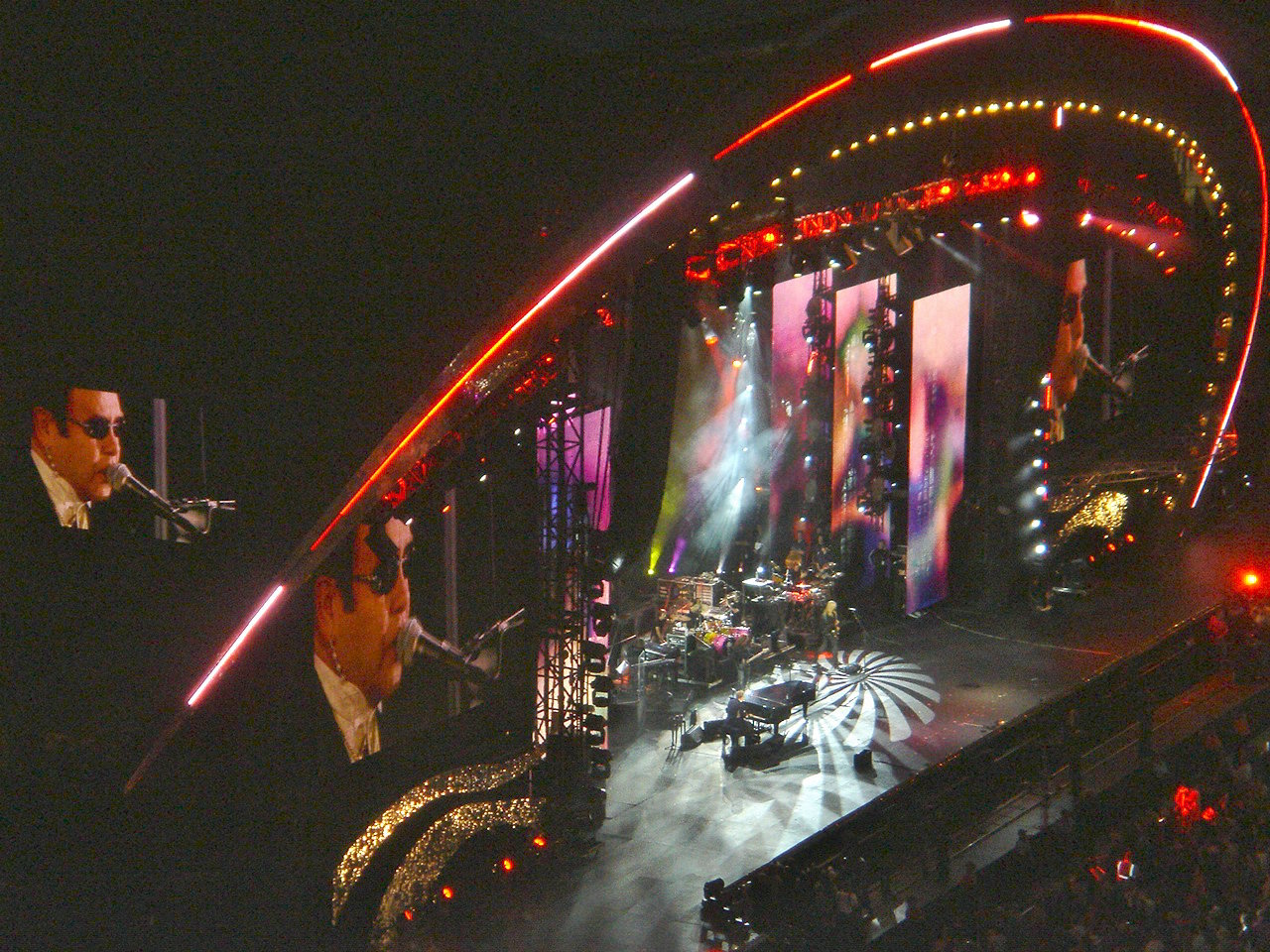
Elton John's second performance

1. Elton John – "Your Song"
2. Duran Duran – "(Reach Up for The) Sunrise", "The Wild Boys" and "Rio"
3. James Morrison – "You Give Me Something" and "Wonderful World"
4. Lily Allen – "LDN" and "Smile"
5. Fergie – "Glamorous" and "Big Girls Don't Cry"
6. The Feeling – "Fill My Little World" and "Love It When You Call"
7. Pharrell Williams – "Drop It Like It's Hot" and "She Wants To Move (Remix)"
8. Nelly Furtado – "Say It Right", "I'm Like a Bird" and "Maneater"
9. English National Ballet – "Swan Lake" (Act IV)
10. Status Quo – "Rockin' All Over the World"
11. Joss Stone – "You Had Me" and "Under Pressure"
12. Roger Hodgson – Supertramp Medley ("Dreamer", "The Logical Song" and "Breakfast in America") and "Give a Little Bit"
13. Orson – "Happiness" and "No Tomorrow"
14. Tom Jones – "Kiss", "I Bet You Look Good on the Dancefloor" and "Ain't That A Lot of Love?" (with Joss Stone)
15. Will Young – "Switch It On"
16. Natasha Bedingfield – "Unwritten"
17. Bryan Ferry – "Slave to Love", "Make You Feel My Love" and "Let's Stick Together"
18. Anastacia – "Superstar"
19. Connie Fisher and Andrea Ross – "Memory"
20. Andrea Bocelli – "The Music of the Night"
21. Josh Groban and Sarah Brightman – "All I Ask of You"
22. Donny Osmond, Jason Donovan, Lee Mead and Chickenshed – "Any Dream Will Do"
23. Rod Stewart – "Maggie May", "Baby Jane" and "Sailing"
24. Kanye West – "Gold Digger", " Touch the Sky", "Stronger", "Diamonds from Sierra Leone" and "Jesus Walks"
25. P. Diddy – "I'll Be Missing You"
26. Take That – "Shine", "Patience" and "Back for Good"
27. Ricky Gervais – "Freelove Freeway" (with Mackenzie Crook), "Chubby Little Loser"
28. Elton John – "Saturday Night's Alright For Fighting", "Tiny Dancer" and "Are You Ready for Love"
- Order of speakers
1. Prince William and Prince Harry
2. Sienna Miller and Dennis Hopper
3. Kiefer Sutherland
4. Ryan Seacrest, Simon Cowell and Randy Jackson
5. Natasha Kaplinsky
6. Dennis Hopper
7. Fearne Cotton
8. Gillian Anderson
9. Boris Becker and John McEnroe
10. Tony Blair
11. Cat Deeley
12. Patsy Kensit
13. Jamie Oliver
14. David Beckham
15. Ben Stiller
16. Ricky Gervais
17. Prince William and Prince Harry
18. Nelson Mandela

== Producers ==
- Graham Pullen
- Geoffrey Matthews
- Phil Christensen

== Attendees ==
- Prince William (Prince of Wales since 2022)
- Prince Harry (Duke of Sussex since 2018)
- Sarah, Duchess of York
- Princess Beatrice of York
- Princess Eugenie of York
- Peter Phillips
- Zara Phillips
- Members of the Spencer family
- Catherine Middleton (then girlfriend of Prince William now the Princess of Wales since 2022) with parents Carole and Michael Middleton, her younger brother James Middleton and younger sister Pippa Middleton
- Chelsy Davy (then girlfriend of Prince Harry)
- David Furnish
- Mike Tindall
- Autumn Kelly
- Peaches Geldof

Diana's former husband King Charles III (then Prince of Wales) was not among the spectators. Together with the Queen, then Prime Minister Gordon Brown and his predecessor Tony Blair, he was among the guests at the memorial service on 31 August 2007 in the Guards Chapel.

== Broadcasting ==
The concert was broadcast in 140 countries. Jamie Theakston, Fearne Cotton and Claudia Winkleman presented for the BBC and many other television channels across the world. In the United States, VH1's coverage was presented by Aamer Haleem, Kate Thornton and Dave Berry.

=== Australia ===
Foxtel on FOX8 in Australia, which was hosted by Molly Meldrum (with a highlights package broadcast by the Nine Network).

=== Canada ===
In Canada, the concert was broadcast live on CTV with a two-hour primetime special highlighting the best performances. The concert reached 2.8 million viewers and the primetime recap peaked at nearly 1 million viewers.

=== Italy ===
Unlike other international events, the Concert for Diana wasn't broadcast by RAI. The live feed was aired by satellite broadcaster Sky Italia on its Sky Vivo channel from 17:00 to 23:00. The concert was also broadcast on commercial radio by RTL 102.5.

=== United Kingdom ===
In the United Kingdom the concert was broadcast on BBC One, BBC HD and BBC Radio 2.

The concert was watched by an average of 8.9 million viewers, and peaked with 14.8 million. Over the 8-hour period it had a 44% viewing share. It received considerably more viewers than the Live Earth concert which was broadcast a week later.

=== United States ===
In the US, MTV Live and VH1 broadcast the concert live from 11 am (EDT). The concert drew near double the viewing figures for the 2005 Live 8 concert with 1.4 million average over the 8 hours.

NBC broadcast a highlights show between 8 pm-11 pm EDT. The NBC showing was the US most watched programme, averaging 8.7 million viewers.

=== Other countries ===
VH1 Latin America broadcast the concert in Latin America, the Caribbean and Central America.

DStv carried it in Africa by showing it on a dedicated channel for the event. Prior to the concert there were television specials on the channel. Star TV throughout Asia, except Japan where it was shown by WOWOW.

A number of broadcasters showed the concert in Europe. Some countries saw the entire show live, others had only highlights. In Germany the broadcaster RTL II showed the highlights from 8.15 pm- 12.15 am CEST

== Ricky Gervais ==
As with many live televised events, the Concert for Diana had a few technical problems, the most infamous of which occurred during comedian Ricky Gervais's monologue, before Elton John's musical finale. As a planned seven-minute routine became twelve minutes, viewers saw a nervous Gervais being forced to fill time, as a stagehand held up signs saying 'two minutes', then 'one minute'. Gervais performed a rendition of a song that David Bowie performed on his show Extras before finally being told to 'throw to the BBC' and presenters Claudia Winkleman and Jamie Theakston. During the extended piece, he performed his iconic "dance" from The Office.

== Charities ==
All net proceeds from the Concert went to the charities chosen by Princes William and Harry. These charities include Diana, Princess of Wales Memorial Fund, Centrepoint and Sentebale, a charity founded in April 2006, by Prince Harry and Lesotho's Prince Seeiso. It helps vulnerable children and young people in Lesotho – particularly those orphaned as a result of AIDS.

During the airing of the concert, Diana was hailed for her generous charity work with the Chain of Hope, Luton Indoor Bowling Club, and British Deaf Association charities. She was also celebrated for her work with the British Red Cross in helping get the word out on land mines in Angola.

== See also ==
- Diana, Princess of Wales Tribute Concert, a 1998 concert held at Althorp Park
