= Orla (dog) =

Cocker Spaniel owned by the Prince and Princess of Wales (born 2020)

- Species: Canis lupus familiaris
- Breed: English Cocker Spaniel
- Sex: Female
- Born: May 2020 (age 6)
- Owners: William, Prince of Wales; Catherine, Princess of Wales

Orla is an English Cocker Spaniel owned by William, Prince of Wales and Catherine, Princess of Wales. She has appeared in several official photographs released by the Wales family and is known to be the family's current pet.

== Background ==
Orla was given to William and Catherine in 2020, shortly before the death of their previous dog, Lupo, who died in November that year. Orla is believed to have been bred by Catherine's brother, James Middleton, who is known for his interest in dog breeding and has previously provided pets to other members of the Middleton family.

The name Orla is of Celtic origin and means "golden princess" in Irish.

== Public appearances ==
Orla made her first official appearance in May 2022 in a photograph marking Princess Charlotte's seventh birthday. The following year, she appeared again in an official portrait released on Charlotte's eighth birthday. In July 2022, Orla made her first public appearance at a charity polo match with William and Catherine. In May 2025, Orla also appeared in a photograph released on National Pet Day in the United Kingdom. In the same month, it was reported that she had given birth to puppies. In February 2026, Catherine confirmed that they had kept one of the puppies and added that he was eight months old. In May 2026, the family marked the puppy's first birthday and revealed his name as Otto. Orla and Otto also appeared in a video released to mark Princess Charlotte’s eleventh birthday.

== See also ==
- List of individual dogs
