= Michael Middleton =

British businessman and former flight dispatcher (born 1949)

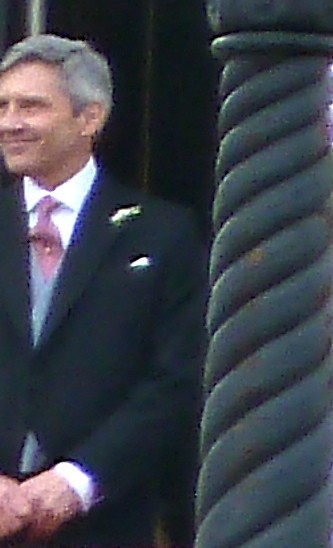
- Middleton on the balcony of Buckingham Palace at the wedding of his eldest daughter Catherine on 29 April 2011
- Born: Michael Francis Middleton; 23 June 1949 (age 77); Leeds, West Riding of Yorkshire, England
- Education: Clifton College
- Alma mater: University of Surrey (BSc)
- Occupation: Businessman
- Spouse: Carole Goldsmith (m. 1980)
- Children: Catherine, Princess of Wales; Philippa Matthews; James Middleton
- Family: Middleton

Michael Francis Middleton (born 23 June 1949) is a British businessman. He is the father of Catherine, Princess of Wales, Philippa Matthews and James Middleton.

Born in Leeds, Middleton was educated at the University of Surrey. He joined British Airways and worked as a flight dispatcher. In 1980, he married Carole Goldsmith, who founded Party Pieces, a mail-order party supply company. Middleton joined his wife at the company in 1989. Their eldest three grandchildren, Prince George, Princess Charlotte, and Prince Louis, are second, third and fourth in line to the British throne respectively. The Middleton family resides at Bucklebury Manor, in Berkshire.

== Early life, education, and early career ==
Michael Francis Middleton was born in Leeds on 23 June 1949 into a wealthy family with connections to the landed gentry. He spent his early years in Moortown, Leeds. Royal historian Robert Lacey describes Middleton as having aristocratic kinship; his grandmother, Olive Christiana Middleton, was close to her second cousin Baroness Airedale (1868–1942). The Middleton family, including Michael's grandfather Richard Noël Middleton and his wife Olive, had played host to members of the British royal family in Leeds from the 1920s.

Middleton's mother was Valerie Middleton (née Glassborow, 1924–2006), who served as a VAD nurse and code-breaker during the Second World War. His father, Captain Peter Middleton (1920–2010), was a pilot who served as an RAF fighter pilot during the Second World War. In 1952 Peter joined British European Airways and the family moved to Beaconsfield, Buckinghamshire. He flew alongside Prince Philip as co-pilot on a two-month flying tour of South America in 1962. British Pathé newsreel film shows Middleton alongside the prince during the tour. Middleton has three brothers: Richard (b. 1947), Simon (b. 1952) and Nicholas (b. 1956). Richard's son, Adam Middleton, is godfather to Michael's granddaughter, Princess Charlotte. Adam's sister Lucy Middleton – a lawyer who, like her brother attended Bedales School – is godmother to Michael's grandson, Prince Louis.

Like his father and grandfather, Middleton was educated at Clifton College, a public school in Bristol. At Clifton, all three generations of Middleton men boarded at Brown's House. The archives at Clifton record that Middleton was a praepostor, the title for a college prefect. Middleton represented Clifton at rugby in the 1st XV and also gained his tennis colours.

Following Clifton, Middleton attended the University of Surrey where he was awarded a BSc in 1973, according to the entry in the Clifton College Register 1962–1978, published by Clifton College Council in October 1979. Middleton then commenced studies for six months at British European Airways' flight school to become a pilot before switching to ground crew where he graduated from the company's internal course. He then worked for British Airways as a flight dispatcher.

== Marriage and family ==
Middleton met his future wife Carole while they were working for British Airways as ground crew. By 1979, he was promoted to aircraft dispatcher, one of British Airways' Red Caps, at London Heathrow Airport. They married on 21 June 1980 at St James's Parish Church in Dorney, Buckinghamshire, and later bought a Victorian house in Bradfield Southend near Reading, Berkshire.

They have three children, two daughters and a son. Following the birth of Catherine Elizabeth (born 1982) and Philippa Charlotte (born 1983), the family moved to Amman, Jordan, where Michael worked as a manager for BA from 1984 to 1986. Their youngest child, James William, was born in 1987.

== Later career and inherited wealth ==
Carole Middleton established Party Pieces, a company making party bags in 1987. It branched into party supplies and decorations by mail order and by 1995 was managed by both Michael and Carole Middleton and had moved into farm buildings at Ashampstead Common. The Middletons' business was successful, at that time, though later collapsed. Along with trust funds inherited by Michael from his aristocrat grandmother, Olive Christiana Middleton (née Lupton), the business enabled the family to continue the Middleton family tradition of sending their children to board at independent schools. All three children were sent to St Andrew's School, Pangbourne and both daughters were sent to Downe House School, a girls' boarding school in Cold Ash, and Marlborough College, in Wiltshire. James also attended Marlborough.

The Middletons sold Party Pieces in May 2023 after it fell into administration. The company owed £2.6 million to creditors when it collapsed, including £612,685 owed to HM Revenue and Customs, £218,749 owed to Royal Bank of Scotland for a Coronavirus Business Interruption loan, and £20,430 to an Afghan refugee whose small business was a supplier of helium gas. The company's administrator's report stated that unsecured creditors were unlikely to be paid.

In 1995, the Middletons purchased Oak Acre, a Tudor-style manor house in Bucklebury, Berkshire. In 2002, the Middletons bought a flat in Chelsea, in which their children lived, which they eventually sold for £1.88 million in 2019. Carole and Michael Middleton are also the owners of a racehorse. By 2012, the Middletons had moved to Bucklebury Manor, a Georgian mansion with an 18-acre estate where their grandson Prince George spent his first few weeks.

The British press created the term Upper Middleton Class to describe the family's social position; other reports refer to the family as being "minted [...] with a smattering of blue-blooded antecedents". Their wealth has resulted in the Middletons being reported to be multi-millionaires.

== Ancestry ==
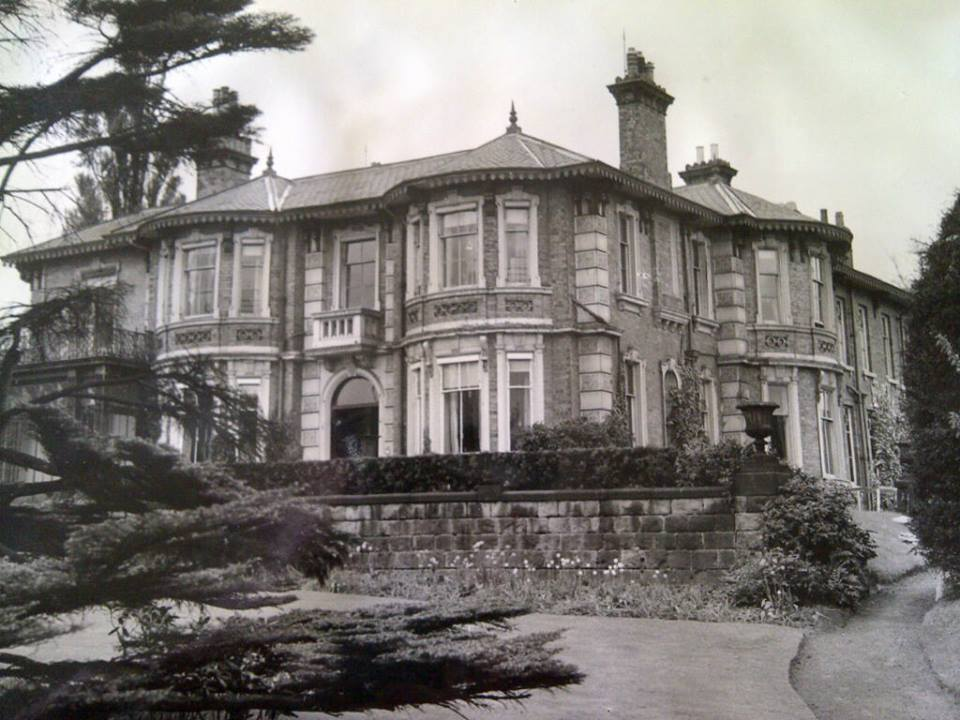
Middleton's great-great-grandfather William Middleton, Esq. owned Gledhow Grange-Hawkhills Estate which was entailed to his son Arthur Middleton.

Michael Middleton's grandmother, Olive Middleton was photographed at Headingley, in 1927, in the procession of dignitaries following Princess Mary who was patron of the Leeds Infirmary fundraising committee of which Olive was a member. Olive's husband, Richard Noel Middleton co-founded the Yorkshire Symphony Orchestra of which the Princess and her son George were patrons. Richard Noel Middleton and his cousin Ralph Middleton, grandson of Sir Henry Berney, 9th Baronet, were solicitors at the Leeds law firm Messrs Middleton & Sons founded by their ancestor, William Middleton in 1834. Michael Middleton's great grandfather, politician Francis Martineau Lupton, was the son of Yorkshire landowner Francis W. Lupton, Esq., whose marriage to educationalist Frances Lupton (née Greenhow) on 1 July 1847, is listed in The Patrician – John Burke's supplement to Burke's Peerage. Her father was surgeon Thomas Michael Greenhow whose wife, Elizabeth, was a member of the Martineau family. Many portraits of Elizabeth's siblings, sociologist Harriet Martineau and James Martineau, a friend of Queen Victoria, are held in London's National Portrait Gallery.

Michael Middleton's family is linked, via his Leeds-born cousin, Lady Bullock (née Barbara Lupton), to William Petty-FitzMaurice, 1st Marquess of Lansdowne, Prime Minister of Great Britain between 1782 and 1783. Through his direct ancestor, Dame Anne Fairfax (née Gascoigne), Michael Middleton has several descents from King Edward III.

The Rev. Thomas Davis, a Church of England hymn-writer is Michael Middleton's paternal ancestor.

== Arms ==
Coat of arms of Michael Middleton
Notes A coat of arms was granted to Michael Middleton by the College of Arms on 19 April 2011. Thomas Woodcock, Garter King of Arms, the senior officer of the College of Arms, helped the family with the design. Adopted 19 April 2011 Crest A Rock Argent, thereon a Wolf sejant Azure, gorged with a Collar of Roses Argent, barbed and seeded Proper, supporting in the dexter Forepaw a Caduceus Or, Serpent Gules. The crest's blazon is based on the arms of the Lupton family, Michael Middleton's grandmother being Olive Middleton (née Lupton). Escutcheon Per pale Azure and Gules, a chevron Or, cotised Argent, between three acorns slipped and leaved Or. Symbolism The dividing line down the centre is a canting of the name "Middle-ton". The acorns (from the oak tree) are a traditional symbol of England and a feature of west Berkshire, where the family have lived for over 30 years. Three acorns denote the family's three children. The gold chevron in the centre of the arms is an allusion to Carole Middleton's maiden name, Goldsmith. The two white chevronels (narrow chevrons above and below the gold chevron) symbolise the following: the peaks and mountains and the family's love of both the Lake District and skiing and also Middleton family relative, Beatrix Potter, a Lake District resident.
