= Gary Goldsmith =

English businessman and entrepreneur (born 1965)

- Born: Gary Christopher Goldsmith; 29 April 1965 (age 60); Ealing, London, England
- Citizenship: United Kingdom
- Occupations: Businessman; entrepreneur
- Spouses: Miranda Foote (m. 1991, divorced) Luan Bettaney (m. 1997, divorced) Julia Leake (m. 2007; div. 2007) Julie-Ann Brown (m. 2012)
- Children: 1
- Relatives: Carole Middleton (sister); Catherine, Princess of Wales (niece); Philippa Matthews (niece); James Middleton (nephew)

Gary Christopher Goldsmith (born 29 April 1965) is a British businessman and entrepreneur who is known for his work in IT recruitment. He is the brother of Carole Middleton (née Goldsmith) and the maternal uncle of Catherine, Princess of Wales. In March 2024, he became the first housemate to be evicted on the twenty-third series of Celebrity Big Brother.

== Early life and family ==
Gary Christopher Goldsmith was born on 29 April 1965 in Perivale, London, the son of Ronald (1931–2003) and Dorothy Goldsmith (née Harrison; 1935–2006); he is the younger brother of Carole Goldsmith and the maternal uncle of Catherine, Princess of Wales, Philippa Matthews, and James Middleton. Goldsmith is a descendant of 19th century aristocrat Sir Thomas Conyers, 9th Baronet whose great-great-granddaughter Jane Harrison (née Liddle; c.1839–1881) is Gary's great-great-grandmother.

== Career ==
Goldsmith has built a career working in IT recruitment, investing and selling several of his businesses in the sector and is worth an estimated £30 million. In July 2009, Goldsmith was the subject of a "sting" by News of the World in which he was filmed dealing cocaine to an undercover reporter.

In March 2024, Goldsmith entered the Celebrity Big Brother house to compete as a housemate on the twenty-third series. His appearance on the show was described as "controversial" due to his 2017 conviction of assault by beating and received condemnation from Women's Aid among others. He became the twenty-third series' first eviction, with this happening on Day 5. He pulled out of the show's live final following the announcement of the Princess of Wales' cancer diagnosis.

== Personal life ==
Goldsmith has been married four times. His first marriage, to Miranda Foote in 1991, ended in divorce. He married Luan Bettaney in 1997 and their daughter, Tallulah, a Stowe School alumna and Goldsmith's only child, was born in the same year. In 2007 Goldsmith married Julia Leake in a civil ceremony. However she left him shortly after. Goldsmith married his fourth wife, Julie-Ann Brown, in 2012. In October 2017 Goldsmith attacked Brown during a "drunken argument"; he was subsequently charged with assault by beating and in November 2017, after pleading guilty to the charge, he was fined £5,000 and given a twelve-month community order.

== Filmography ==
As himself
Year	Title	Role	Ref.
2022	Tonight Live with Dan Wootton	Guest; 1 episode	
2024	Celebrity Big Brother	Housemate; series 23	
