= Lupo (dog) =

Cocker Spaniel owned by the Prince and Princess of Wales (2011–2020)

- Species: Canis lupus familiaris
- Breed: English Cocker Spaniel
- Sex: Male
- Born: December 2011
- Died: November 2020 (aged 8)
- Owners: Prince William, Duke of Cambridge; Catherine, Duchess of Cambridge

Lupo (December 2011 – November 2020) was an English Cocker Spaniel owned by Prince William and Catherine, then known as Duke and Duchess of Cambridge. He was credited with raising the profile of the breed in the United Kingdom by The Kennel Club, and appeared in photographs alongside his owners' son, Prince George.

== Life and family ==
Lupo was bred from Ella, a dog owned by Michael and Carole Middleton, the parents of Catherine, Princess of Wales. He was a working-type English Cocker Spaniel. Lupo was born in a litter just prior to Christmas 2011, and was given to Catherine and her husband, Prince William.

Following the birth of William and Catherine's son Prince George of Wales, Lupo was featured in one of the first official photographs. He was subsequently featured in a family portrait with William, Catherine and George in March 2014. He did not travel with his owners on their tour of Australia and New Zealand in 2014. Lupo briefly appeared posthumously in a video released to commemorate William and Catherine's tenth anniversary, filmed in 2020 at Anmer Hall.

=== Origin of name ===
"Lupo" is the Italian word for wolf and derived from Latin "lupus". It was reported that Catherine named the dog after the family of her paternal great-grandmother, Olive Christiana Middleton (née Lupton); the Lupton family crest has wolves on it. The pair appeared on the front cover of Hello magazine.

== Death ==
Lupo died in November 2020, of unknown causes. The Duke and Duchess of Cambridge shared an image on Instagram on 22 November 2020, saying: "Very sadly last weekend our dear dog, Lupo, passed away. He has been at the heart of our family for the past nine years and we will miss him so much. – W & C".

== Cultural impact ==
The Kennel Club has attributed the raised profile and interest in English Cocker Spaniels to Lupo. There was an increase of 50% in the searches on its "Find A Puppy" website in the months following the royal couple's announcement of their ownership of Lupo. This increased interest has also had the effect of an increase in thefts of English Cocker Spaniels.

Aby King is signed to a four-book deal to write about the fictional adventures of Lupo for children. She was inspired following walks in Kensington Palace Gardens with her own Cocker Spaniel, and the death of her fiancé. The first book is called The Adventures of Lupo the Royal Dog: The Secret of Windsor Castle and was released in September 2014.

== See also ==
- List of individual dogs
