= Cecil Middleton =

English cricketer (1911–1984)

Personal information
- Born: 26 May 1911; Leeds, Yorkshire, England
- Died: 3 September 1984 (aged 73); Southend, Argyll, Scotland
- Batting: Right-handed
- Bowling: Right-arm medium

Domestic team information
- Years: Team
- 1933: Oxford University

Career statistics
Competition	First-class
Matches	4
Runs scored	128
Batting average	21.33
100s/50s	0/0
Top score	44
Balls bowled	359
Wickets	4
Bowling average	50.25
5 wickets in innings	0
10 wickets in match	0
Best bowling	3/60
Catches/stumpings	1/–
- Source: Cricinfo, 4 March 2020

Cecil Middleton (26 May 1911 – 3 September 1984) was an English first-class cricketer.

Middleton was born in Leeds in May 1911, the son of Henry Dubs Middleton and Jane Dorothy Elizabeth Middleton (née Berney), daughter of Sir Henry Hanson Berney, 9th Baronet. Middleton's great-grandfather was Henry Dübs. Middleton was educated at Charterhouse School, before going up to University College, Oxford. While studying at Oxford, he played first-class cricket for Oxford University in 1933, making four appearances. He scored 128 runs in his four matches, at an average of 21.33 and a high score of 44. With his right-arm medium pace bowling, he took four wickets with best figures of 3 for 60.

Middleton was an Oxford Blue and champion golfer, winning the St Andrews Foursomes Cup at The Royal and Ancient Golf Club of St Andrews in the early 1930s. Middleton also excelled at Fives although in 1929 he was defeated when playing against Eton at Charterhouse, his alma mater. In April 1933, Middleton was reportedly the 'smart spin bowler in attendance with H. J. Gundill' supporting the Yorkshire County Cricket Club.

Middleton died in Scotland in September 1984 at Southend, Argyll.

Other members of Middleton's family who were well known sportspeople include his cousin, Robert Carrington Middleton (1875–1916) who was reportedly also born in Leeds and boarded at Marlborough College where he learned the game of hockey, later representing Yorkshire county in that sport. He and his wife also played tennis with Mrs R.C. Middleton representing Yorkshire county in 1928 when playing in an exhibition of lawn tennis with three other players. The event had been organised by the Police Recreation Society with Princess Mary attending the match.
