= Thomas Davis (priest) =

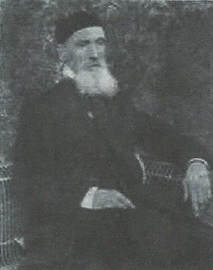
Thomas Davis M.A. Oxon, Vicar of Roundhay for 48 years. Died November 11th 1887, aged 83 years

Thomas Davis (15 February 1804 – 11 November 1887) was a Church of England clergyman, author and hymn writer.

== Life ==
=== Family life ===
Davis was the son of the Rev Richard Francis Davis DD (ca. 1766–1844), by his marriage to Sarah Stable. Richard had been awarded his degree in 1788 from Oxford University having resided there at University College from 1784. Richard's son, Thomas Davis, was born at Worcester where Richard had been rector since 1795. Thomas Davis's grandfather was the "Mayor of Worcester, Thomas Davis, Esq." (d.1820) and is recorded in the Gentleman's Magazine in 1788 as having "kissed the hand" of King George III at the Bishop's Palace, Worcester.

Thomas Davis was educated at Queen's College, Oxford, graduating Bachelor of Arts in 1832. He proceeded to Master of Arts. In 1833 Davis was ordained a priest and became his father's curate at Worcester, and in 1840 was appointed Vicar of Roundhay, Leeds in Yorkshire. Davis's father died at the age of 78 on Christmas Day, 1844, of "a violent cold".

On 10 December 1839, at Stratford-upon-Avon, Davis married Christiana Maria Hobbes, a daughter of Robert Hobbes, attorney-at-law, and between 1843 and 1851 they had six children, Christiana F., Arthur Sladen, Henry Champney, Mary Sarah, Harriet Albina, and Emily Judith. Davis died on 11 November 1887 at Heslington, Yorkshire, aged 83, while his widow survived him until 1899.

=== Controversial career ===
Davis is recorded in The Westminster Review as "one of the conscientious clergyman of the Church of England" who was "unable to preach the doctrine of endless suffering". A Philosophical Radical, Davis's controversial views were published in 1866 in his book Endless Sufferings not the Doctrine of Scripture.

=== Descendants ===
Davis's daughter Harriet (1850–1892) married politician Francis Martineau Lupton (died 1921) of Leeds, and their daughter Olive Christiana Middleton (1881–1936) was the grandmother of Michael Francis Middleton, father of Catherine, Princess of Wales and Pippa Middleton.

== Publications ==
- Devotional Verse for a Month, &c. (1855)
- Songs for the Suffering (1859)
- Endless Sufferings not the Doctrine of Scripture (1866)
- Annus Sanctus; or, Aids to Holiness in Verse (1877)

Davis's notable hymns include Sing, ye seraphs in the sky and O Paradise eternal!
