= Carole Middleton =

Mother of Catherine, Princess of Wales (born 1955)

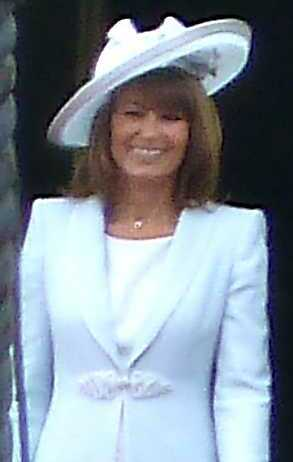
- Middleton in 2011
- Born: Carole Elizabeth Goldsmith; 31 January 1955 (age 71); Perivale, London, England
- Occupation: Businesswoman
- Spouse: Michael Middleton (m. 1980)
- Children: Catherine, Princess of Wales; Philippa Matthews; James Middleton
- Relatives: Gary Goldsmith (brother)
- Family: Middleton

Carole Elizabeth Middleton (née Goldsmith; born 31 January 1955) is an English businesswoman. She is the mother of Catherine, Princess of Wales, Philippa Matthews, and James Middleton.

Born in Perivale and brought up in Southall, London, Middleton was educated at Featherstone High School before working as a secretary. She joined British Airways and worked as a flight attendant until her marriage to Michael Middleton, a member of the Middleton family.

Middleton founded Party Pieces, a mail-order party-supply company, in 1987. Her first three grandchildren, Prince George, Princess Charlotte, and Prince Louis, are second, third, and fourth in line to the British throne, respectively. The Middleton family resides at Bucklebury Manor, in Berkshire.

== Family background and early life ==
Carole Elizabeth Goldsmith was born on 31 January 1955 in Perivale, London, the daughter of Ronald (1931–2003) and Dorothy Goldsmith (née Harrison; 1935–2006), great-granddaughter of Jane Harrison (née Liddle; c.1839–1881) whose great-great-grandfather was aristocrat Sir Thomas Conyers, 9th Baronet.

Her father was a craftsman decorator, while her mother worked as a part-time sales assistant in a jewelry shop. She spent her early years in council housing in Ealing before moving to a small home in Southall, west London, attending the local high school. She is the older sister of IT recruitment multi-millionaire businessman Gary Goldsmith.

She left school aged 16 but returned and achieved four A-levels. She subsequently worked as a shop assistant for John Lewis before being hired as a secretary for British Airways. She then transferred to ground crew and by her marriage in 1980 was working as a flight attendant.

== Career ==
In 1987, Middleton established Party Pieces, a company that began by making party bags and which then sold party supplies and decorations by mail order. Middleton first began the business "at her kitchen table" and distributed thousands of leaflets to advertise locally. Her husband quit his job at British Airways to join her at the company in 1989. In 1995, the firm's growth necessitated its headquarters be moved to a range of farm buildings at Ashampstead Common. Party Pieces was sold in May 2023 after it fell into administration. The company owed £2.6 million to creditors when it collapsed, including £612,685 owed to HM Revenue and Customs, £218,749 owed to Royal Bank of Scotland for a Coronavirus Business Interruption Loan, and £20,430 to an Afghan refugee whose small business was a supplier of helium gas. The company's administrator's report stated that unsecured creditors were unlikely to be paid.

== Personal life ==
Goldsmith married colleague flight dispatcher Michael Middleton on 21 June 1980 at the Church of St James in Dorney, Buckinghamshire. Her husband descended from a prominent Yorkshire family with aristocratic roots; his grandmother Olive Middleton was a V.A.D. nurse alongside her second cousin Florence, Baroness Airedale. The couple subsequently bought a Victorian house in Bradfield Southend near Reading, Berkshire. The Middletons had three children: Catherine (b. 9 January 1982), Philippa (b. 6 September 1983) and James (b. 15 April 1987). The family moved to Jordan in 1984 before returning to West Berkshire, Bradfield Southend, in 1986. In 1995, the Middletons purchased Oak Acre, a Tudor-style manor house in Bucklebury, Berkshire. In 2002, Middleton and her husband bought "with cash" a flat in Chelsea, London, in which their children lived after completing their university studies. The flat was sold for £1.88 million in 2019.

In 2011, her daughter Catherine married Prince William at Westminster Abbey. The gold chevron on the coat of arms commissioned by her husband that year is in reference to Middleton's maiden name of Goldsmith. She has seven grandchildren: Prince George, Princess Charlotte and Prince Louis of Wales, Arthur Michael William, Grace Elizabeth Jane and Rose Louise Victoria Matthews, as well as James's son, Inigo. In 2012, the family bought Bucklebury Manor, in Bucklebury, West Berkshire – a Grade II listed Georgian manor house set on more than 18 acres.

The Middleton family's wealth is the result of their business combined with the trust funds inherited from Olive Christiana Middleton (née Lupton), whom the BBC reported in 2011 as being Michael Middleton's aristocrat grandmother. This wealth has resulted in the Middletons being reported to be multi-millionaires.

== Support for family ==
In 2024, Middleton played a significant role in supporting her daughter Catherine, Princess of Wales, during her cancer diagnosis and treatment. She was photographed driving Catherine in Windsor in February 2024, marking Catherine's first public sighting after abdominal surgery in January. On 9 September 2024, Middleton appeared in a Kensington Palace video alongside her husband Michael, Catherine, Prince William, and their three children, playing cards, as Catherine announced she had completed chemotherapy. The Middleton family's closeness was further highlighted by James Middleton's Instagram post, stating, "Over the years, we have climbed many mountains together. As a family, we will climb this one with you too."
