= Diana, Princess of Wales Tribute Concert =

British music

Coordinates: 52°16′53″N 1°00′12″W

- Genre: Benefit concert
- Dates: 27 June 1998
- Locations: Althorp Park, Northamptonshire, England
- Founders: Earl Spencer

The Diana, Princess of Wales Tribute Concert was a British music concert held in memory of Diana, Princess of Wales on 27 June 1998, a few days before the date of what would have been her 37th birthday. The concert was held at Althorp Park, the Northamptonshire seat of the Spencer family, and Diana's childhood home. Artists and groups who performed at the concert were among those enjoyed by the late Princess, and included Cliff Richard, Chris de Burgh, David Hasselhoff, Duran Duran, Jimmy Ruffin, Lesley Garrett and Lawrence Gowan. The concert was attended by 15,000 people, with proceeds from ticket sales being donated to the Diana, Princess of Wales Memorial Fund, but the £39.50 price attracted criticism due to its perceived expense. Phil Collins, who did not appear at the concert, was among those to comment on the amount charged to concertgoers. Highlights of the concert were broadcast on BBC One on the evening of 1 July.

The idea of holding a concert at the Althorp estate was conceived by Earl Spencer, and details were first revealed in January 1998, shortly after it had been announced that Althorp would be opened to the public for the first time. The concert would feature a lineup of artists and groups from the worlds of classical music, pop and rock, all genres liked by the late Princess. The lineup was announced on 27 February, with tickets going on sale the following day. Two thirds of the tickets had sold out by the end of February, but BBC News reported they had not sold out as quickly as anticipated, prompting Collins to highlight what he believed to be their high cost in a radio interview.

Althorp Park was opened to the public a few days after the concert, with an entrance fee of £9.00. Visitors were invited to view an exhibition of the Princess's life and works. This remained open until 30 August, the day before the first anniversary of her death.

== See also ==
- Concert for Diana, a 2007 concert held at Wembley Stadium
