= James Middleton =

Younger brother of Catherine, Princess of Wales (born 1987)

- Born: James William Middleton; 15 April 1987 (age 39); Reading, Berkshire, England
- Education: University of Edinburgh (attended)
- Occupation: Businessman
- Spouse: Alizée Thevenet (m. 2021)
- Children: 1
- Parents: Michael Middleton (father); Carole Goldsmith (mother)
- Family: Middleton

James William Middleton (born 15 April 1987) is a British entrepreneur who is the younger brother of Catherine, Princess of Wales.

Born in Reading, Berkshire, Middleton was educated at St Andrew's School, Pangbourne. He briefly attended the University of Edinburgh before dropping out and founding a cake-making business. Middleton began receiving media attention during his eldest sister's relationship with and subsequent marriage to Prince William. He is a mental health advocate and has spoken about his experiences with major depressive disorder. Middleton is also an ambassador for the Pets As Therapy charity.

== Early life and education ==
James William Middleton was born on 15 April 1987 at the Royal Berkshire Hospital in Reading, the youngest child and only son of Michael Middleton (born 1949), a former British Airways flight dispatcher, and Carole Middleton (born 1955), a former flight attendant. His father came from a line of solicitors who lived in Leeds, West Yorkshire. His great-grandmother Olive Middleton was a member of the Lupton family, who were landed gentry. His mother's family were from County Durham. Shortly before his birth, Middleton's parents founded Party Pieces, a mail-order party supply company. His elder sisters are Catherine (born 1982) and Philippa (born 1983). The family lived in Bradfield Southend, Berkshire, before moving to the nearby village of Bucklebury in 1995. Middleton was educated at St Andrew's School, Pangbourne, and Marlborough College. In 2006, he attended the University of Edinburgh, studying environmental resources management before dropping out a year later.

== Career ==
Middleton's cake-making business, now defunct, was inspired by reading that a mother's baking is a highly evocative childhood memory. He supplied baking kits so home bakers would be able to get all the ingredients in one place for adventurous creations such as "football cakes". He started baking in the family kitchen and expanded into a freight container and converted barns. Themed birthday cake baking kits were distributed by his parents' company, Party Pieces.

Themed cakes were later provided for companies such as Jigsaw, 3 and Ralph Lauren. Middleton caused "shudders" at Buckingham Palace after taking part in a Hello magazine photoshoot for which he was commissioned to bake 21 cakes commemorating its 21st birthday, each iced with one of the magazine's front covers – amongst them, several members of the royal family, including Diana, Princess of Wales. The business won Smarta 100 and Haines Watts Young Entrepreneur awards. In April 2011, he registered three businesses: Nice Cakes, Nice Wine, and Nice Group London and planned to expand the Cake Kit Company. The Cake Kit Company was dissolved in 2015. In May 2020, Middleton launched Ella & Co, a mail order dog food company that offers freeze-dried, raw, organic dog food.

=== Boomf ===
Boomf
- Magical Mallows
- Type: Private
- Industry: Personalised confectionery
- Founded: November 2013
- Founders: James Middleton and Andy Bell
- Headquarters: Reading and London, England
- Area served: Global
- Website: www.boomf.com

In 2013, Middleton and Andy Bell founded boomf, a company that makes personalised marshmallows and greeting cards. Middleton had previously founded Nice Cakes, which specialised in personalised cakes. Bell had previously founded Mint Digital, which created StickyGram (now Sticky9), an Instagram magnet company which sold to PhotoBox.

Boomf launched in November 2013 without mentioning Middleton's involvement, to allow for a low profile launch. In January 2014, Boomf announced Middleton's involvement, believing that it would be impossible to keep it secret long-term.

In 2014, Boomf raised over $1m and was backed by a number of angel investors, including Nick Jenkins, founder of Moonpig, Duncan Jennings and Matt Wheeler. Boomf shipped 2 tons of marshmallows in its first year and made £100,000 ($168,000) in sales in its first three months.

In 2015, the company raised funds at a valuation of £10m. Boomf made a loss of £3 million between 2015 and 2018. In July 2015, Boomf launched a nationwide search for a new marshmallow designer. The winner was Bournemouth University student Izzy Burton.

Middleton's brother-in-law, hedge fund manager James Matthews paid Middleton €110,000 for 12,800 Boomf shares. In 2019, Middleton announced that the company had reached profitability with an income of £176,000 in the previous year - and an increase in sales of up to £4.4 million from £2.8 million in the previous year. The company moved into new offices in Reading with circa 20,000 square feet (1,900 m^{2}) to warehouse space.

Boomf raised $1m of funding in 2021, but by December 2021 the company had fallen into administration owing £800,000 to creditors, including £146,306 to HM Revenue and Customs. Creditors voluntary liquidation commenced on 4 November 2022.

== Personal life ==
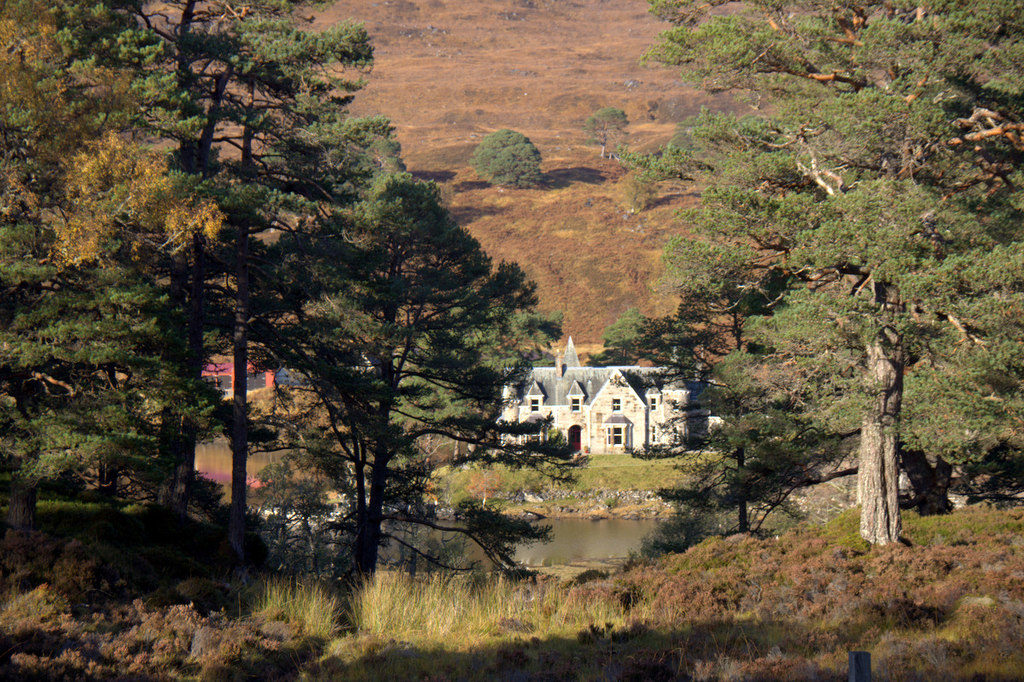
Middleton has hosted deer stalking parties at Glen Affric Estate, owned by the family of Philippa's husband

Middleton is dyslexic. He read from the New Revised Standard Version of the Bible at the 2011 wedding of his sister Catherine to Prince William. In 2019, he disclosed his struggles with depression and attention deficit hyperactivity disorder, which he attributed to public scrutiny from age 23 as a result of his eldest sister's relationship. He sought treatment in 2017, undertaking cognitive behavioral therapy. Middleton also spent "restorative time" at the Glen Affric Estate, where he has hosted deer-stalking parties. The estate is owned by his sister Philippa's father-in-law. In the same year, he penned a column in the Daily Mail about mental health.

Middleton is an ambassador for the Pets As Therapy charity and has credited his dog, Ella, for helping him through his depression. He breeds dogs, owning six, as well as one rescue lamb. Middleton also keeps bees on the grounds of Bucklebury Manor. In April 2020, he founded the Paw Print Fund in aid of animal welfare charities.

Middleton was in a relationship with actress Donna Air from 2013 to 2018. Middleton met French financial analyst Alizée Thevenet (b. 30 November 1989) in 2018. She is the daughter of retired diplomat Jean-Gabriel Thevenet. Middleton and Alizée announced their engagement in September 2019. On 11th September 2021, Alizée's mother, along with James's family, attended the wedding in the village of Bormes-les-Mimosas in the south of France where Alizée's family lives. Alizée's father had died some months before the wedding. They had planned to wed in summer 2020 but postponed the event twice due to the COVID-19 pandemic. At her wedding, Alizée wore the 1980s wedding dress belonging to Carole Middleton, her mother-in-law. The couple welcomed their first child, Inigo Gabriel, on 21 September 2023.

== Arms ==
Coat of arms of James Middleton
Notes The arms of James William Middleton are the arms of his father differenced by a gold label. In heraldry, the label is the mark of the first son. Adopted 19 April 2011 Crest A Rock Argent, thereon a Wolf sejant Azure, gorged with a Collar of Roses Argent, barbed and seeded proper, supporting in the dexter forepaw a Caduceus Or, serpent Gules, labeled Or. Escutcheon Per pale Azure and Gules, a chevron Or, cotised Argent, between three acorns slipped and leaved Or (Middleton). Symbolism The dividing line (between two colours) down the centre is a canting of the name 'Middle-ton'. The acorns (from the oak tree) are a traditional symbol of England and a feature of west Berkshire, where the family lived. The three acorns also denote the family's three children. The gold chevron in the centre of the arms is an allusion to Carole Middleton's maiden name of Goldsmith. The two white chevronels (narrow chevrons above and below the gold chevron) symbolise peaks and mountains, and the family's love of the Lake District and skiing.

== Bibliography ==
=== Books ===
- Middleton, James (2024). Meet Ella: The Dog Who Saved My Life. Radar. ISBN 978-1804192504.

=== Articles ===
- Middleton, James (28 January 2023). "Farewell Ella, the dog who saved my life". The Times.
