= Middleton family =

Family of Catherine, Princess of Wales

Middleton
- Arms granted to Michael Francis Middleton (father of Catherine, Princess of Wales) on 19 April 2011, as the armigerous head of the family
- Current region: Bucklebury, West Berkshire, England
- Earlier spellings: Middeltone; Mideltuna; Middeltune
- Origin: United Kingdom
- Members: The Princess of Wales; Michael Middleton; Carole Middleton; Philippa Matthews; James Middleton; Cecil Middleton
- Connected families: Lupton family; Berney baronets; Barons Airedale; Bullock family; Martineau family; House of Windsor (British royal family)
- Estate: Bucklebury Manor

The Middleton family is an English family that has been related to the British royal family by marriage since the wedding of Catherine Middleton to Prince William in April 2011, when she became the Duchess of Cambridge. The couple have three children: George, Charlotte and Louis. Tracing their origins back to the Tudor era, the Middleton family of Yorkshire of the late 18th century were recorded as owning property of the Rectory Manor of Wakefield with the land passing down to solicitor William Middleton who established the family law firm in Leeds which spanned five generations. Some members of the firm inherited woollen mills after the First World War. By the turn of the 20th century, the Middleton family had married into the British nobility and, by the 1920s, the family were playing host to the British royal family.

== History ==
=== Gledhow Grange-Hawkhills Estate ===
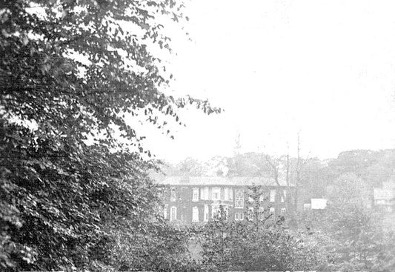
Gledhow Grange-Hawkhills Estate, Middleton family seat seen from Gledhow Lake, West Yorkshire

By the late Georgian era, the Middleton family were established in the West Riding of Yorkshire as cultural and civic figures, particularly in the legal profession. The law firm Messrs Middleton & Sons was founded in Leeds in 1834 by gentleman farmer and solicitor William Middleton, Esq. (1807–1884) of Gledhow Grange-Hawkhills Estate. One of his sons, solicitor Arthur Middleton (1846–1907), inherited Hawkhills from his father. In 1879, Arthur married Jessie Marie Dubs (1858–1950), daughter of Henry Dübs (Founder of Locomotive works Dübs & Co. in Glasgow). In 1902, Arthur bought Moorfield Lodge and its adjoining Moor Grange. Both were sold to the University of Leeds in 1950, becoming Tetley Hall of Residence.

Gledhow Grange-Hawkhills Estate abutted Gledhow Lake as did the adjacent Gledhow Hall. In 1881, William Middleton's son, Edwin (1841–1892), a keen ice skater, was reported as the hon. treasurer of the Gledhow Skating Club. Gledhow Hall was owned at that time by Samuel Croft, the former Mayor of Leeds (1875) and the club's other hon. treasurer. The Leeds Mercury recorded in January 1881 that "per S. Croft and Edwin Middleton", a "proportion of surplus [funds] from the Gledhow Skating Club had been donated to the Leeds Infirmary". William's son, Robert (1847-1912), was married in 1874 to Mary Anne Howe; Robert's brother, Edwin, was married in 1870 to Mary Anne Howe's sister, Catherine Howe. Robert was a hydraulic and general engineer and established Sheepscar Foundry. He lived at Gledhow Lodge. Their nephew, Tom Taylor, had bought Hawkhills by 1908 following the death in 1907 of Arthur Middleton to whom Hawkhills had been entailed. From 1885, the owner of Gledhow Hall was James Kitson, 1st Baron Airedale with the first marriage between the neighbouring Middleton and Kitson families occurring in March 1900.

William Middleton's descendants include his grandson (Richard) Noël Middleton (1878–1951), a solicitor, director of the family woollen manufacturing firm and co-founder of the Yorkshire Symphony Orchestra. Noël Middleton's youngest son was Peter Francis Middleton, who was Prince Philip's co-pilot on a tour of South America. Peter Middleton's second son is entrepreneur Michael Francis Middleton, who married Carole Goldsmith in 1980. By 1995, the couple had purchased Oak Acre, a Tudor-style manor house in Berkshire surrounded by around two acres including a field where they lived with their three children.

=== Party Pieces ===
Michael and Carole Middleton founded a mail-order supply company, Party Pieces, in 1987, but sold it in May 2023 after it fell into administration. The company was at one point estimated to be worth £30 million, but by the time it collapsed it owed £2.6 million to creditors, including £612,685 owed to HM Revenue and Customs, £218,749 owed to Royal Bank of Scotland for a Coronavirus Business Interruption loan, and £20,430 to an Afghan refugee whose small business was a supplier of helium gas. The company's administrator's report stated that unsecured creditors were unlikely to be paid.

The children of Michael and Carole Middleton are: Catherine Elizabeth, Princess of Wales, socialite and columnist Philippa Charlotte Matthews and businessman James William Middleton. The Middletons purchased Bucklebury Manor in 2012.

=== Aristocratic ties ===
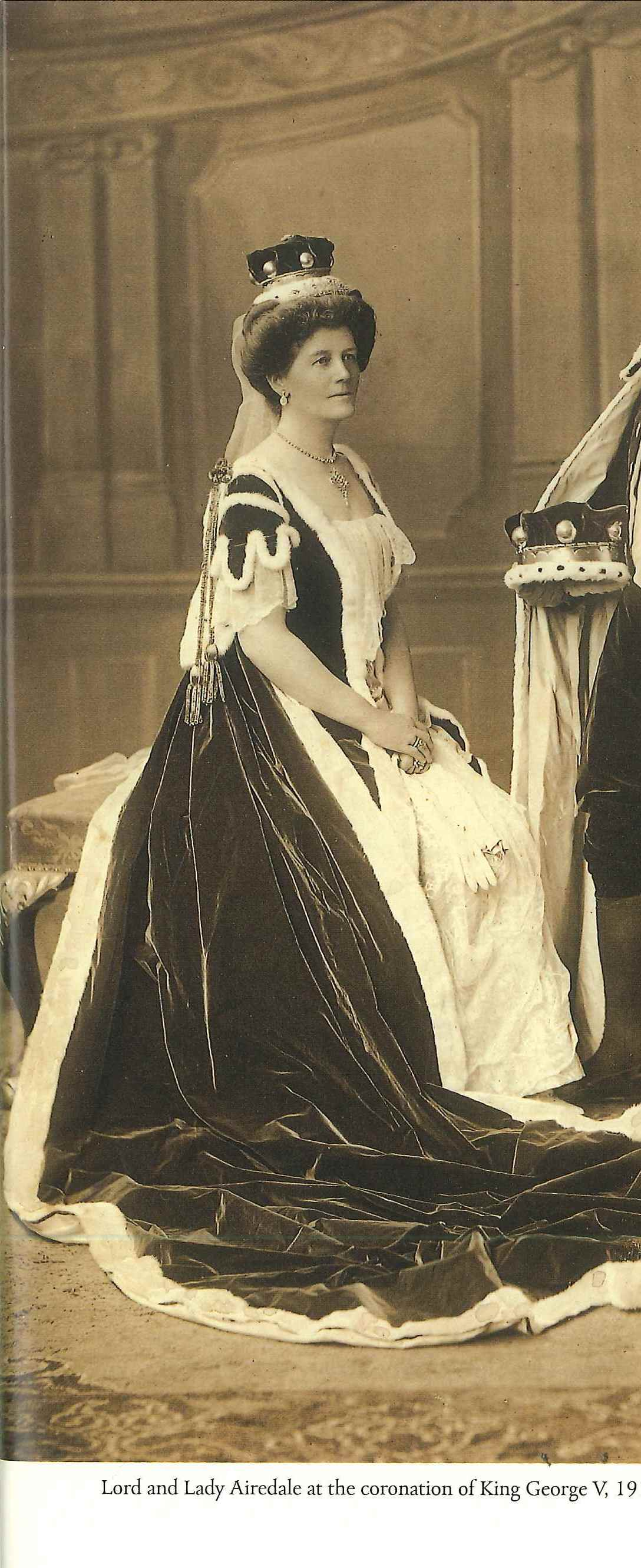
Olive Middleton volunteered with her second cousin Baroness Airedale, pictured at the coronation of George V

Robert Lacey describes the Middleton family as having aristocratic kinship. The Middletons were "friends of British royalty" to whom, in their civic capacity, they "played host as long ago as 1926". The great-grandfather of Catherine, Princess of Wales, Noël Middleton, and his elder brother, photographer and civil engineer Captain William Middleton (1874–1940) reportedly wed their fiancées in Leeds at Mill Hill Chapel in the years before the First World War. Mrs William Middleton (née Agnes Clara Talbot) was the niece of Sir James Kitson, 1st Baronet (later 1st Baron Airedale), who led the chapel's congregation at this time, while Mrs Noël Middleton (née Olive Christiana Lupton) was the first cousin-once-removed of Baroness von Schunck (née Kate Lupton), and the second cousin of Baroness Airedale (née Florence von Schunck) and of Lady Bullock (née Barbara Lupton). The 1990 edition of Debrett's Peerage records that the daughter of Mr and Mrs William Middleton - Clara Talbot Middleton (1903-1985) - married Thomas Arthur Charles Pakenham, scion of the Earls of Longford in December 1925.

Two of the grandchildren of William Middleton (1807–1884) were solicitor Henry Dubs Middleton (1880–1932), a Charterhouse alumnus, and Gertrude Middleton (1876–1942), educated at St Leonards School, who were both students at the University of Oxford between 1899 and 1903; Gertrude, the "wealthy" sister of Noël Middleton, studied at St Anne's College while her cousin studied law at University College. Henry served as Chairman of Leeds General Infirmary where he played host to Princess Mary in 1932. He was married to golfer Jane Middleton (née Berney) (1878–1964), a daughter of Sir Henry Hanson Berney, 9th Baronet (great-grandson of George Neville, 1st Earl of Abergavenny). Their sons were Ralph Middleton (1908–1990), who was, like their father, a solicitor who later headed the family law firm, and cricketer Cecil Middleton (1911–1984). They were educated at Charterhouse and University College, Oxford.

=== Family law, oil and woollen manufacturing firms ===
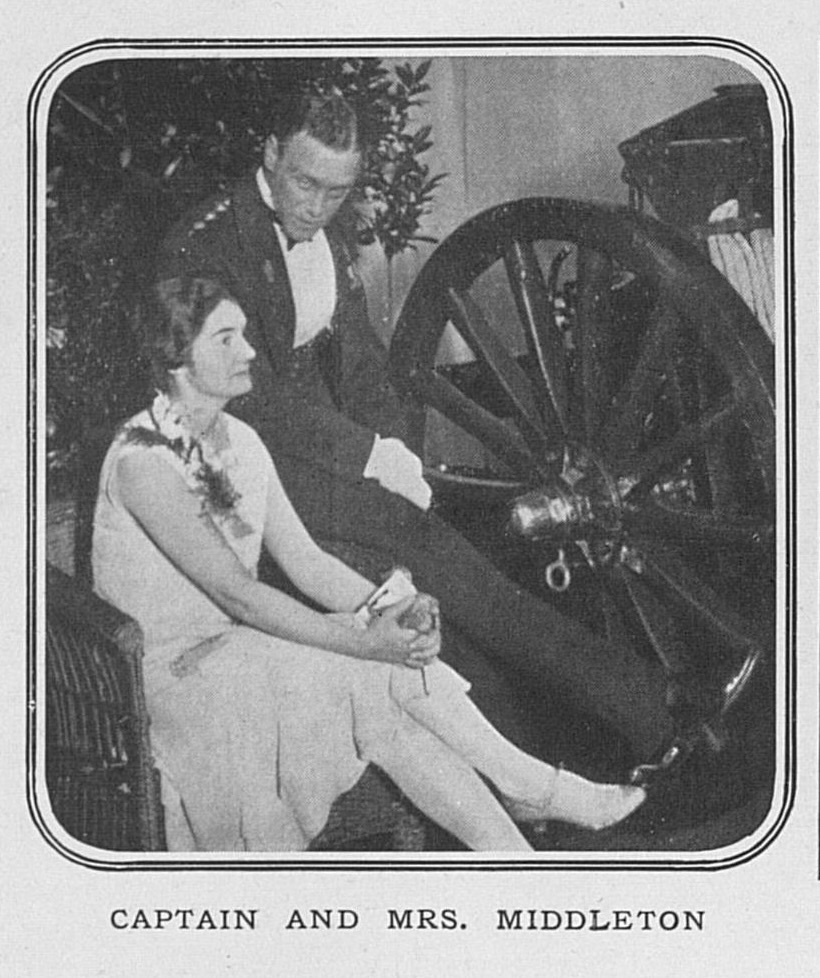
Photo from 1928 Tatler: Captain A. L. and Mrs Middleton, of The Terrace, Boston Spa.

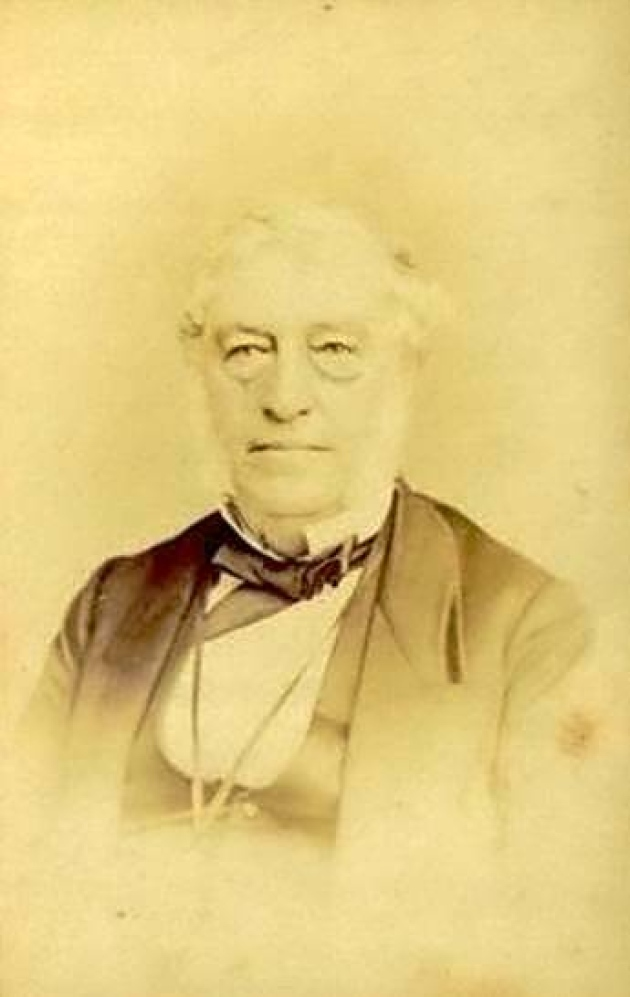
John William Middleton, of Fairfield far Headingley.

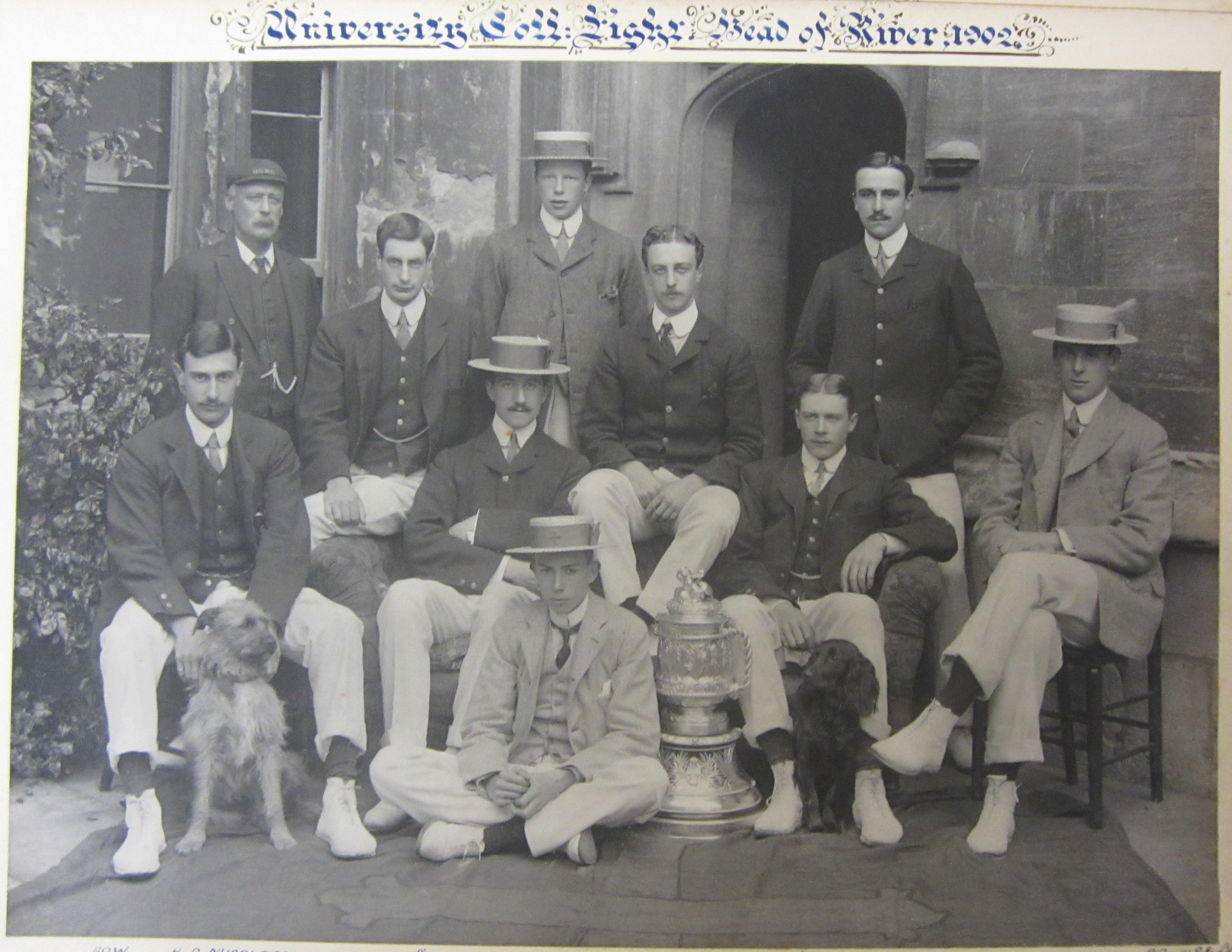
1902: University College, Oxford Rowing VIII Head of the River—far right (with boater) is Henry Dubs Middleton

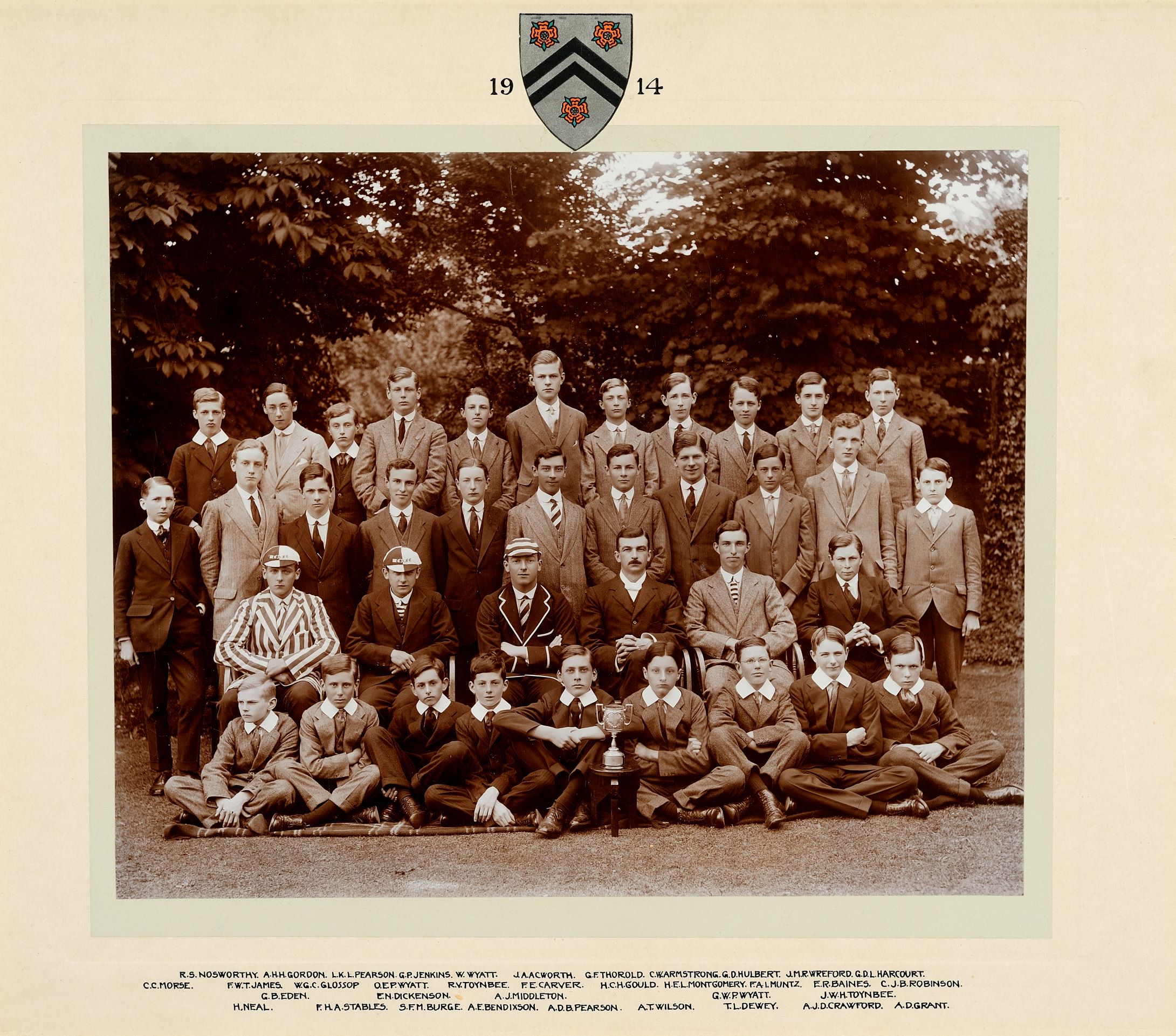
John A. Middleton, Winchester College, seated on chair, 3rd from left wearing cricket cap worn when playing in the 1914 Eton Match

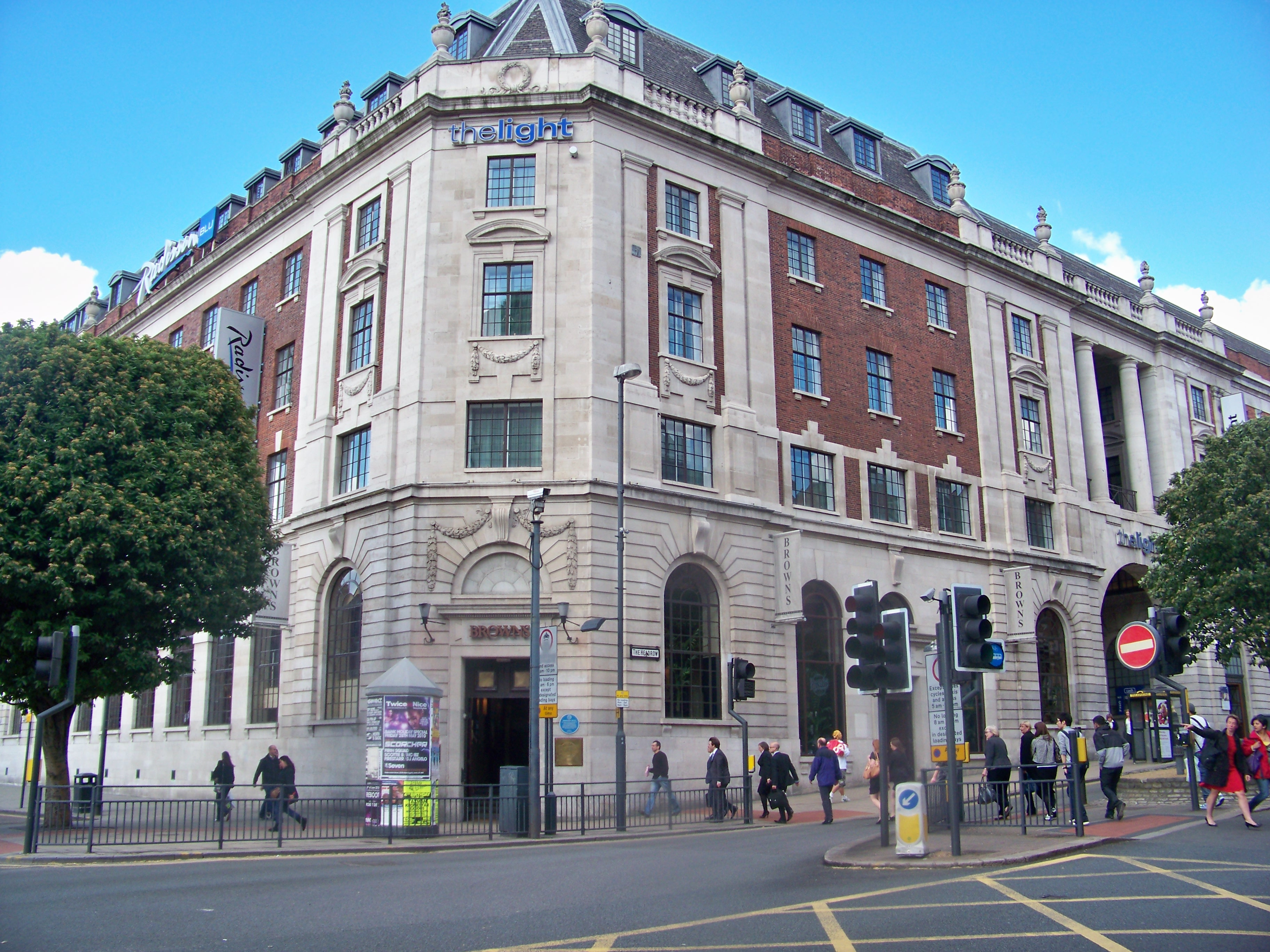
Permanent House, the former head office of the Leeds Permanent Building Society, which was once occupied by the law firm Middletons.

Many relatives of Michael Middleton (father of the Princess of Wales) were solicitors in the Leeds-based family firm, Messrs Middleton & Sons. His grandfather Noël Middleton, great-grandfather John William Middleton, Esq. (1839–1887), and great-great-grandfather William Middleton, Esq., as well as many other Middleton relatives, were all solicitors at the law firm which William had established in 1834. William Middleton's 1884 obituary in the Leeds Times records that the firm Middleton & Sons had been solicitors to the Leeds Permanent Building Society since its establishment in 1848.

William Middleton's great-grandson John Alfred Middleton (later Middleton-Joy, 1895–1975) was the son of Gilbert Middleton (1865–1921), a church soloist (the Church of St Oswald, Filey and St Chad's Church, Far Headingley) and solicitor. John Alfred Middleton studied at Winchester College where he was a substitute in the college's First XI in the 1914 Eton Match. He studied at Christ Church, Oxford where he gained a legal qualification (Jurisprudence). In 1962, Middleton-Joy was a director of Edward Joy & Sons Ltd, manufacturers of Filtrate Oil, having previously been chairman of the company. He married Dorothea, daughter of Judge Thomas D. Beighton. Middleton and his wife were members of Ascot Heath. Reportedly one of "the keenest women in Leeds on horse-racing matters", Mrs John Alfred Middleton-Joy and her husband dined alongside fellow racing enthusiasts Princess Mary and her husband, the Earl of Harewood, at a Tangiers hotel in February 1934.

John Middleton-Joy's elder brother, solicitor Alan Lomas Middleton (1893–1970) was, like his brother, an Oxford graduate. Alan and their father Gilbert, a Cheltenham College alumni, were members of the Yorkshire Ramblers' Club as was Gilbert's brother Noël Middleton. Alan's son David Middleton (died 2023, age 95) attended Winchester and then went up to New College, Oxford University after which he was a solicitor at the family law firm and President of the Leeds Law Society. David attended the wedding at Westminster Abbey in April 2011 of Catherine Middleton – his second cousin, once removed – to Prince William.

Noël Middleton was a director of William Lupton & Co., the Leeds textile manufacturing firm his wife, Olive, had inherited in 1921. His two elder sons, Christopher Maurice Middleton (later Lupton)—an alumnus of Clifton College and Cambridge University's Emmanuel College—and Anthony John Middleton a graduate of Clifton College, worked at the family's manufacturing firm. In 1958, after closing their business, Anthony moved to Beaconsfield, Buckinghamshire.

Described by Tina Brown as being at the "top level of the legal profession in Leeds", Middletons solicitors (formerly known as Middleton & Sons) existed for over 150 years, then absorbed into Booth & Co in 1985 - itself later absorbed by Addleshaw and merged with Theodore Goddard in 2003 to form Addleshaw Goddard.

Michael Middleton's niece, Lucy Middleton, is a London-based solicitor and a godparent of Prince Louis.

== Peter and Valerie Middleton ==
Michael Middleton's father was Captain Peter Francis Middleton (1920–2010), a commercial pilot and Royal Air Force officer.

His boyhood in Leeds saw Peter Middleton share a governess with his second cousins, Dr Francis G. H. Lupton OBE (1921–2006) and Arthur Ralph Ransome Lupton (1924–2009), both nephews of Arthur Ransome.

As all three of Middleton's maternal uncles died in the First World War, the family seat, Beechwood Estate, was inherited by his grandfather's younger brother, Arthur Greenhow Lupton (1850–1930), and later controlled by his spinster daughters, Dr Elinor Gertrude Lupton (1886–1979), a Lady Mayoress of Leeds, and Elizabeth Lupton (1888–1977). Francis Lupton's 2001 book, The Next Generation: A Sequel to The Lupton Family in Leeds by C.A. Lupton contains Middleton's memoirs in which he recalls attending formal family gatherings at Beechwood:

"...the even greater ordeal of the annual Beechwood Party, for which I still remember the horrors of trying to tie a black bow tie for my first dinner jacket. Nor will I forget my terror of Lady Bryce..."

Lady Bryce was the aunt of his mother's first cousins, sisters Elinor and Elizabeth Lupton. Middleton wrote that he was "somewhat in awe" of his unmarried cousins who shared a love of animal husbandry with their friend Princess Mary. The two sisters also shared great-grandparents with Beatrix Potter.

Middleton boarded at Clifton College (1934-1939) and then studied English at New College, Oxford. After leaving in 1940 he served as a RAF fighter pilot during the Second World War. Commissioned as a pilot officer (on probation) in the RAFVR on 9 March 1941, Middleton was confirmed in his rank and promoted to flying officer (war-substantive) on 9 March 1942. In May 1942, he was posted to No 37 Service Flying School in Calgary, Canada where he spent two-and-a-half years as an instructor, training Spitfire, Hurricane and Lancaster pilots. On 9 March 1943, he received a promotion to flight lieutenant (war-substantive). After joining the reservist 605 Squadron at Manston, near Ramsgate in Kent, in August 1944, Middleton flew a de Havilland Mosquito fighter bomber, nudging the wings of unmanned German V1 flying aircraft to divert them from hitting London. After the war, he flew with Lancashire Aircraft Corporation, but remained in the reconstituted RAFVR, receiving a reserve commission as a flying officer on 12 August 1949. Promoted to flight lieutenant on 1 March 1951, In 1952 Peter joined British European Airways (BEA) and the family moved to Beaconsfield, Buckinghamshire. He relinquished his reserve commission on 12 August 1959. Middleton retired in May 1974. On the last page of his flight logbook, Middleton calculated that he had flown 16,000 hours or five and a half million miles during his flying career, “or 220 times around the world”. Owning a number of yachts, he contributed to the 2013 book Total Loss: Dramatic First-Hand Accounts of Yacht Losses at Sea describing how, in August 1976, he and his wife set sail from the Hamble in their 35ft ketch to cross the Atlantic. Heading for the Bahamas, he wrote that the following February, ten miles off the coast of the island of Mayaguana, with a terrible crash they hit a reef. He concluded that "at the age of 70, after 40 years cruising, I sold our latest boat and 'swallowed the anchor'."

On a two-month tour of South America in 1962, Prince Philip piloted 49 of the tour's 62 flights with Peter Middleton as his co-pilot, to whom he sent a letter of thanks and a pair of gold cufflinks. British Pathé newsreel captured the two men during the tour. Middleton met his granddaughter's fiancé, Prince William, on his 90th birthday and William attended his funeral in November 2010.

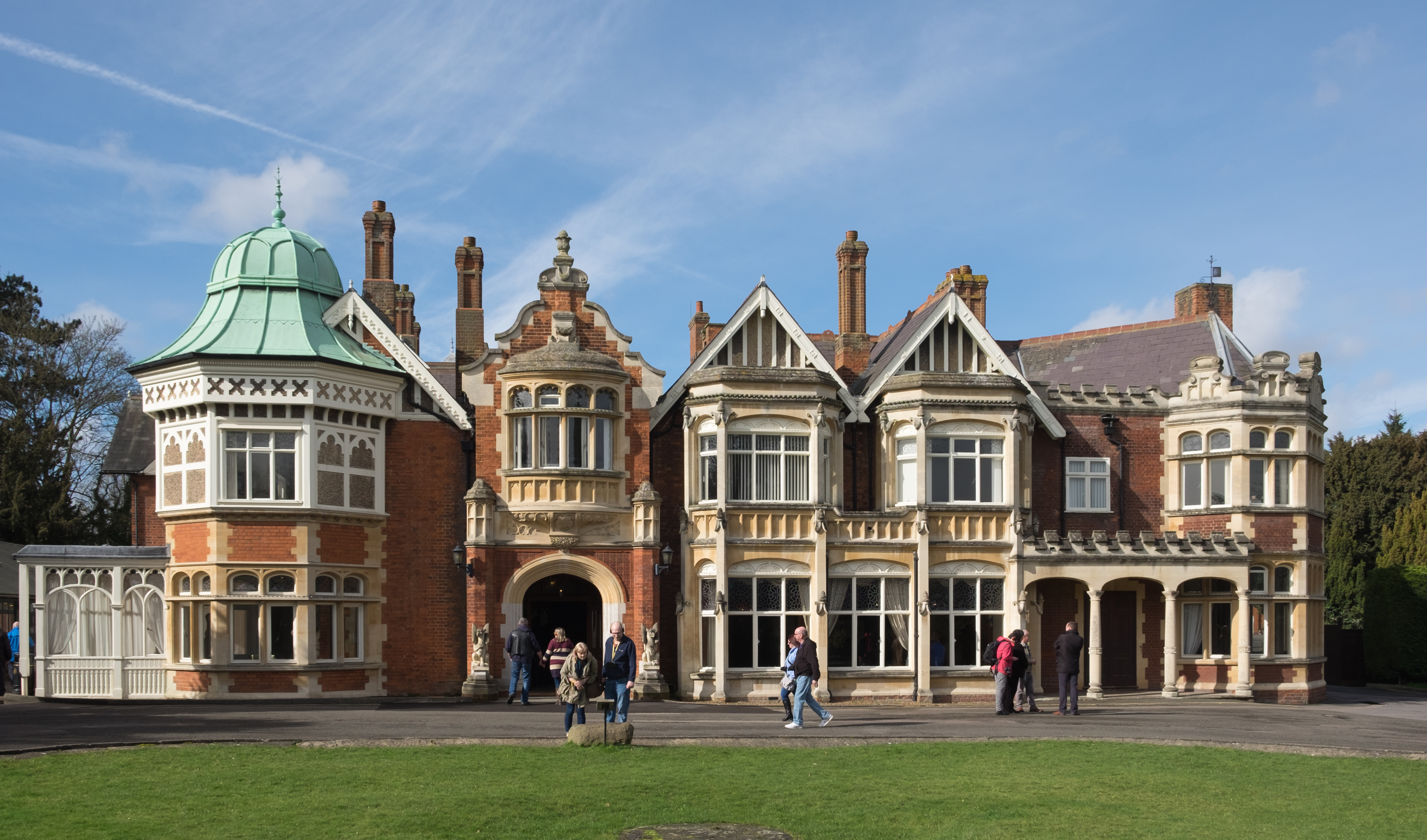
A memorial at Bletchley Park commemorates Valerie Middleton's work there as a code-breaker

Michael's mother, Valerie (née Glassborow, 1924–2006) was the daughter of bank manager Frederick Glassborow and his wife, Constance (née Robison). She and her twin sister Mary were born in Marseille and grew up in France. They were bilingual. Valerie attended an English boarding school and later studied at a private secretarial college. Valerie Middleton served as a VAD nurse during the Second World War and in August 2020, in commemoration of the British Red Cross, her granddaughter, Catherine, Princess of Wales, shared a "personal family photo" of her grandmother wearing her British Red Cross uniform.

Valerie and Mary also worked at the Government Code and Cypher School in Bletchley Park where a memorial commemorates her work as a code-breaker. Her colleague and friend, Lady Body (née Marion Graham), recalled in 2014 that she had shared a "rather special moment" with Valerie: "Our superior officer, Commander Williams, came into the room smiling and he said, 'Well done, girls. A signal has been intercepted from Tokyo to Geneva and it's the signal that the Japanese are surrendering'. He told us that a message has gone to the King and the Prime Minister but that it could not be announced until Geneva has sent on the message to London". Mary (1924–1975) married Peter's brother Anthony Middleton on 5 April 1947.

== Grandparents of Michael Middleton ==
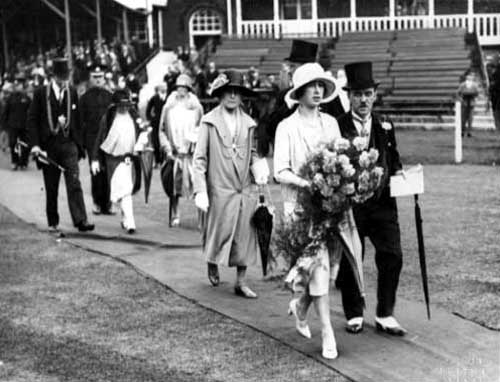
Olive Middleton in a white hat and fur shawl at the back of a procession of dignitaries accompanying Princess Mary in Headingley, Leeds in 1927

Trust funds had been established from the fortunes of Michael Middleton's grandmother, heiress Olive Christiana Middleton (1881–1936), a member of the Lupton family. Olive was educated at Roedean School and was accepted into Cambridge University's Newnham College where her sister Anne later studied. Olive was in the procession of dignitaries accompanying Princess Mary in Headingley in 1927 and on the princess' fundraising committee for the Leeds General Infirmary.

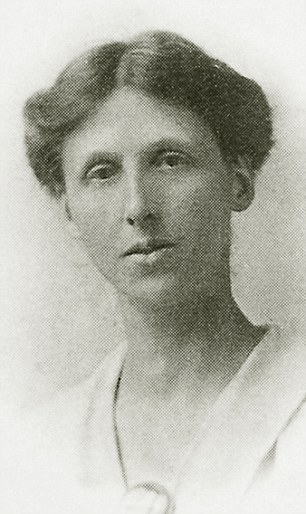
Olive Christiana Middleton (née Lupton)

Olive's husband was Leeds-born (Richard) Noël Middleton (1878–1951), who boarded at Clifton College until 1896. Although accepted to study at New College, Oxford, he chose to commence his legal training in Leeds whilst attending law lectures at Victoria University, Leeds. In 1898 and 1899, as a member of the Leeds Law Students' Society, Noël partook in debating competitions.

Noël Middleton "married the aristocrat", Olive, at the Mill Hill Chapel in Leeds in 1914. In 1919, he retired as a solicitor from the legal practice in Leeds he shared with Sir William Henry Clarke (1861–1930) who had served his clerkship in Leeds with Middleton's father, John William Middleton (1839–1887) and was a City of Leeds councillor alongside Olive's father.

Members of the Middleton family were politically active – "staunch Conservatives" (Tories) and adhered to High Church Anglicanism. They were close to the Venerable Archdeacon J.B. Seaton (Oxford) who, in 1921, officiated at the funeral of Noël Middleton's brother, solicitor Gilbert Middleton, at the wedding of Gilbert's daughter Margaret in Leeds in 1925 and his son Alan's wedding in 1926 at St. Mary Abbots Church, Kensington at which the groomsmen reportedly included Alan's brother John, a Winchester alumni and Christ Church, Oxford graduate in Jurisprudence and their uncle, solicitor Noël Middleton.

Noël Middleton was a co-founder of the Yorkshire Symphony Orchestra and a regular guest at musical soirées at Harewood House, home of Mary, Princess Royal. He was reported in November 1949 as representing the Leeds Musical Festival Committee when conversing with the Princess and her son, George Lascelles, 7th Earl of Harewood at the Leeds Civic Hall. His daughter Anne Margaret Middleton married James Barton, Violinist; member of Allegri Quartet.

In 1909, Middleton was a committee member of the Leeds Art Gallery alongside architect Sydney Kitson (1871–1937).

Olive Middleton's family had contributed to the political life of both the UK and to the civic life of Leeds, especially in the areas of education, housing, and public health, for several generations. Her father, Francis Martineau Lupton, was a landowner and lead magistrate who dealt with probate matters for the Leeds and West Riding Court. The 1899 House of Commons Parliamentary Papers record Lupton as being instrumental in establishing a Parliamentary Inquiry into the religious education for dissenting Protestants.

In June 1914, Olive and her sister-in-law Gertrude—"Mrs Middleton and Miss Middleton"—and Olive's second cousin "Miss Lupton" (later Lady Bullock) were reported as guests at the First and Third Trinity Boat Club May Ball. Olive Middleton was close to the Hon. Doris Kitson, daughter of her second cousin, Florence, Baroness Airedale (née von Schunck), and attended society balls at her home, Gledhow Hall. During the First World War, the house was converted into a Voluntary Aid Detachment hospital run by the Red Cross and the newly married Olive worked there as a nurse with Doris, a fellow Old Roedeanian. Gledhow Hall’s commandant during the war was Lady Nussey (nee Edith Cliff), the first cousin of Mrs William Middleton (nee Agnes Clara Talbot). Catherine, Princess of Wales visited London's Imperial War Museum in 2018 to read records stating that her great-grandmother was "in residence"—on and off—as a VAD nurse at Gledhow Hall from May 1915 to April 1917. Olive remained involved with the VAD cause for many years.

Olive Middleton supported the Leeds branch of the Association for the Care and Protection of Friendless Girls which her grandmother Frances Lupton (née Greenhow) had helped establish in 1885. Also reportedly supporting the association was another of Frances's granddaughters, Elinor, as well as Baroness von Schunck (née Kate Lupton) and her daughter, the Hon. Mrs Albert Kitson (née Florence von Schunck, later Baroness Airedale), the respective niece and great-niece of Frances.

Olive Middleton's brother, Lionel Martineau Lupton (1892–1916) attended Rugby alongside Alan Lomas Middleton, following which he attended Trinity College, Cambridge at the same time as Diana, Princess of Wales's grandfather Albert Spencer, 7th Earl Spencer where both men studied the same subject. They joined up together to fight in the Great War which saw Lionel and his two brothers killed. In April 1917, George V "commanded" that a letter be written to the brothers' father in which the King recognised the exceptional loss of "your gallant" sons. Olive and her family were reportedly invited in 1905 to the "fashionable wedding" at Holy Trinity, Sloane Street of her second cousin Alan Cecil Lupton to Mary, sister of Sir Merrick Burrell, 7th Baronet at which another of Olive's second cousins, Norman Darnton Lupton (1875–1953), acted as best man and his sister Agnes as bridesmaid. Nöel Middleton references having met with Norman in a telegram he sent to his father-in-law, Francis Martineau Lupton, upon the death of Francis' eldest son, Major Francis Ashford Lupton on the Western Front in 1917.

=== Newton Park and Beechwood Estates ===
Members of Olive Middleton's family owned the Newton Park and Beechwood estates in Leeds, the latter being the family seat where, for decades, the "whole family would gather". The Lupton family are described in the Leeds City Council's photographic archive as "woollen manufacturers and landed gentry—a political and business dynasty"; Olive's first cousin-once-removed, Baroness von Schunck (née Kate Lupton), alongside her daughter and son-in-law, Baron and Baroness Airedale, had been invited to the coronation of King George V in 1911.

In 1891, Olive Middleton's grandmother Frances employed seven indoor servants, including a lady's maid at Beechwood; the estate's cottages housed gardeners, grooms, coachmen and a farm bailiff.

Her father, Francis Martineau Lupton, was the eldest son and heir of Francis Lupton III and grew up initially at Potternewton Hall on the family's Newton Park Estate and then their Georgian Beechwood Estate, in Roundhay. Whereas the family eventually sub-divided Newton Park, the Beechwood estate was entailed to Olive's eldest brother, Francis Ashford Lupton, who lacked a male heir. His death on 26 February 1917 followed the deaths of his two younger brothers—all First World War casualties. Their father's death occurred in 1921. Olive Middleton and her sister, Anne Lupton, inherited a portion of the Newton Park Estate but were prohibited from inheriting Beechwood and the estate succeeded to their father's brother, Arthur Greenhow Lupton. Arthur's only son, Major Arthur Michael Lupton married Dorothy Winifred Lupton, widow of Francis Ashford. He died in 1929 following an accident on his horse the previous year whilst fox hunting on the Bramham Moor Hunt, and Beechwood passed to his only son, Thomas “Tom“ Michael Lupton (1920–2008). As Tom was only nine at the time of his father's death, his spinster aunts, Elinor and Elizabeth—"The Misses Lupton"—were granted a life interest in Beechwood and continued to live there, occasionally opening their gardens to the public. After their deaths (Elizabeth in 1977 and Elinor in 1979), Tom inherited Beechwood and in 2016, his children continue to retain some of the estate.

=== City of Leeds dignitaries ===
On 2 September 1914, Lord Mayor Lord Brotherton announced that the Leeds City Council would be raising a new battalion: the Leeds Pals. His committee was composed of "City dignitaries" including Olive Middleton's father, alderman Francis Martineau Lupton and his brother Arthur Greenhow Lupton. The following year, they were filmed inspecting the Pals troops alongside another one of their brothers, Lord Mayor Sir Charles Lupton. Olive's first cousin, Lady Mayoress Elinor Lupton, regularly played host to the Princess Royal.

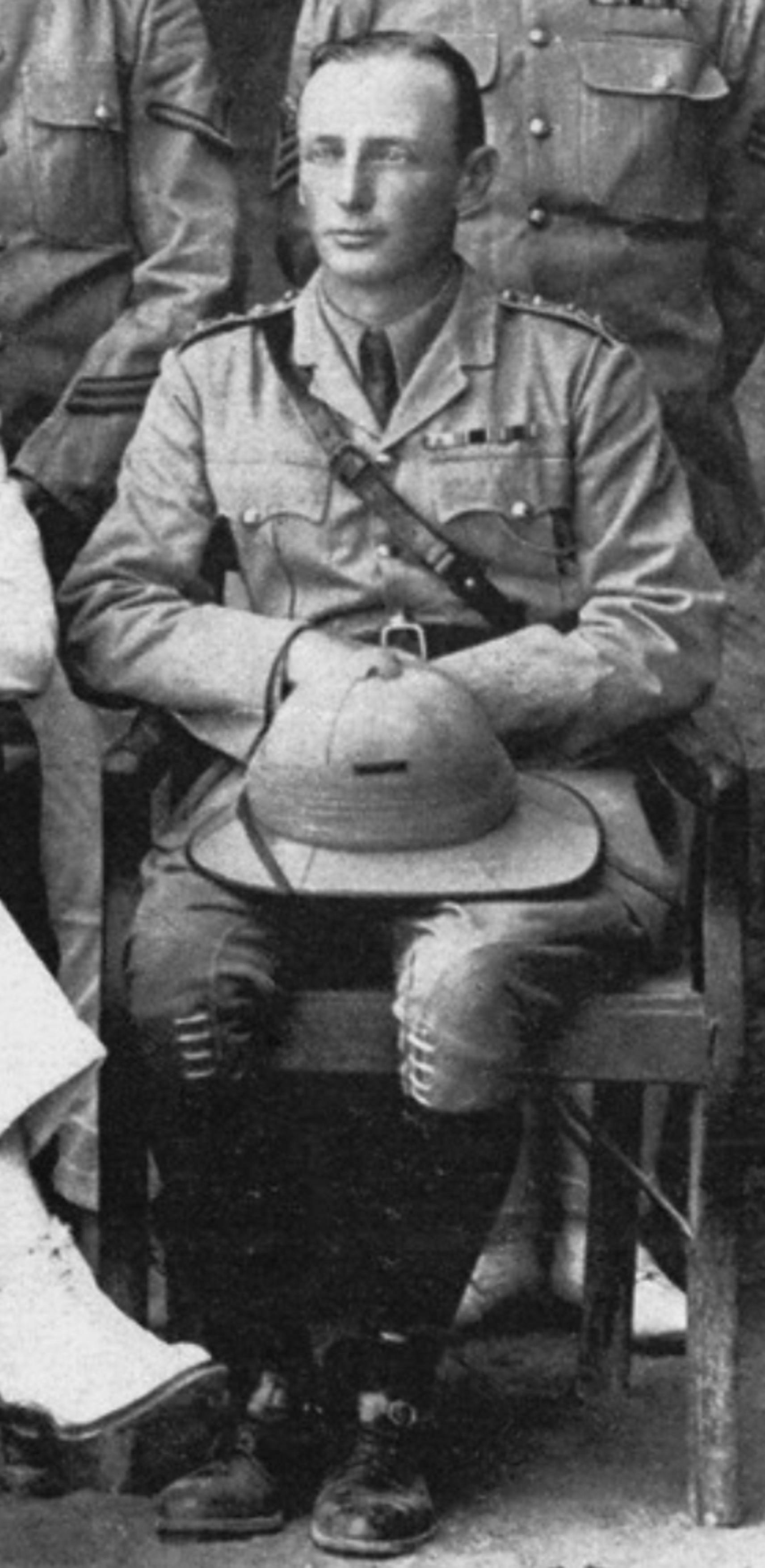
Winchester and Sandhurst graduate Major Arthur Daryl Middleton

In the 1930s, both Noël Middleton and his first cousin, Major Arthur Daryl Middleton (1892–1962), were committee members of the Leeds Triennial Musical Festival. In 1942, Major Middleton was a member of the Trustees of the Patronage of Leeds Vicarage alongside Henry Lascelles, 6th Earl of Harewood. He was a solicitor at Messrs Middleton & Sons. He married Muriel Winifred Paul (1904-1979), daughter of Colonel James A. Paul, of Bramhope Hall. Her nephew was Sir Timothy Kitson.

As the Assistant Commissioner for the Leeds County Scouts Association, solicitor Alan Lomas Middleton arranged a visit by the Prince of Wales (later Edward VIII) to Leeds in June 1923 where the Prince's position as the Chief Scout of Wales reportedly saw him examine—"with deep interest"—Middleton's scouts, most of whom were visually-impaired. The Prince and Middleton had a "very sympathetic conversation" after which the Prince expressed his good wishes and gave them a salute.

Two of Olive Middleton's uncles were Lord Mayors of Leeds: brothers Hugh Lupton and Sir Charles Lupton. Sir Charles also served as Deputy lieutenant of Yorkshire County (West Riding), and his Lord Lieutenant was Princess Mary's father-in-law, Henry Lascelles, 5th Earl of Harewood. Amongst the mourners at Charles' funeral in 1935 – which paid tribute in particular to his twenty-one years as chairman of the Leeds General Infirmary – were Norman D. Lupton, Alan Cecil Lupton, Lady Bryce, Sir Edwin Airey, Lord Ashton of Hyde, Beatrice Kitson, Lady Clarke, Alan Lomas Middleton, Mrs Henry Dubs Middleton and Mr and Mrs Noël Middleton. In February 1947, the Leeds funeral of former Lord Mayor Hugh Lupton was attended by civic dignitaries and family, including his great-nephews, brothers Christopher, Anthony and Peter Middleton, and their father, Noël Middleton.

=== Nursing and welfare ===
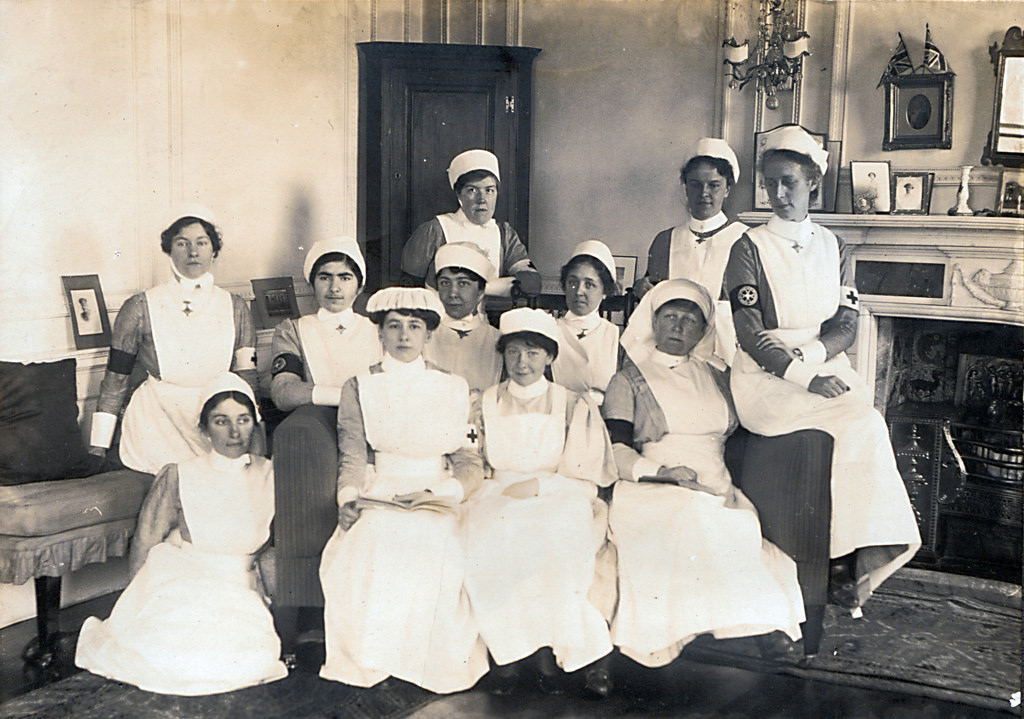
Olive Middleton, far right, seated on arm of couch, in 1915 at Gledhow Hall. Olive's sister-in-law, Gertrude Middleton, is standing beside her

In 2018, Catherine, Princess of Wales, stated that her patronage of the Nursing Now campaign meant a lot to her personally as both her great-grandmother, Olive Middleton, and grandmother, Valerie Middleton, have been VAD nurses. In 2022, it was revealed that Catherine's great-great-aunt Gertrude Middleton was also a VAD nurse at Gledhow Hall, the home of Baroness Airedale, Olive's second cousin.

In 1903, Gertrude's twin sister Caroline Middleton (1876–1961) published an essay in the Leeds Girls' High School annals about working with Helen Gladstone at London's Women's University Settlement:

"...where people like ourselves...live amongst the poor and get to know them in order that they may be able to help them in the best and wisest way. This is by helping the poor to help themselves. It is our work is to advise ways and means to help and advise bettering their conditions."

In 1930, another of Noël Middleton's spinster sisters – Miss Olive Middleton (1870–1961) – was reportedly a committee member of the Workpeople's Hospital Fund alongside her aunt Mrs Arthur Middleton (1858–1950) who, like her niece, was a committee member of the Leeds Association of Girls' Clubs and a friend of the Rev. E. H. Dykes, Vicar of Oulton (1898–1903).

Noël Middleton's brother, Gilbert, was a lead choralist and Church warden of St Chad's Church, Far Headingley and owned Glebe House, Hollin Lane, Far Headingley which, from 1889 until 1893 had operated as St Chad's Home for Girls. The service at the funeral in 1887 of the brothers' father, J.W. Middleton, was read by the Rev. Dr. Smyth, vicar of St Chad's Church where his son Arthur Middleton had also been a "regular attender" and had his own funeral in 1907.

Noël Middleton and his niece, Mrs Ronald Broughton Hopkins (née Margaret Middleton, 1900–1972), held honorary positions on nursing and welfare-related committees in Leeds.

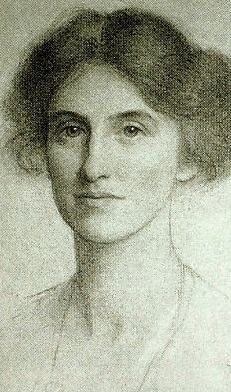
Portrait of Anne Lupton (sister of Olive Middleton née Lupton) who was a leading children's welfare campaigner

In August 2025, The Times reported that the Princess of Wales's great-great aunt – Anne Lupton (sister of the Princess's great-grandmother Olive Middleton), shared her passion for children's welfare with her great-great niece: the Princess. A prominent housing campaigner, Anne set up the London Housing Centre in 1935 where she "mingled with George V, Queen Mary, Edward VIII and the Queen Mother, all of whom visited Anne's centre".

=== Photography ===
Many generations of Catherine's family have participated in the art of photography, including her great-great grandfather solicitor John Middleton, her great-grandfather solicitor Noël Middleton, his brother William and their sister Margaret, who was due to study at the University of Oxford but drowned in April 1900 whilst taking photographs of Filey Brigg. Catherine's grandfather, Peter Middleton, further nurtured his family's passion for photography.

== Ancestry ==
Ancestors of Catherine, Princess of Wales

16. John William Middleton
8. Richard Nöel Middleton
17. Mary Asquith
4. Peter Francis Middleton
18. Francis Martineau Lupton
9. Olive Christiana Lupton
19. Harriet Albina Davis
2. Michael Francis Middleton
20. Frederick John Glassborow
10. Frederick George Glassborow
21. Emily Jane Elliott
5. Valerie Glassborow
22. Gavin Fullarton Robison
11. Constance Robison
23. Sarah Ann Gee
1. Catherine, Princess of Wales
24. John Goldsmith
12. Stephen Charles Goldsmith
25. Jane Dorsett
6. Ronald John James Goldsmith
26. Theophilus Benjamin Chandler
13. Edith Eliza Chandler
27. Amelia White
3. Carole Elizabeth Goldsmith
28. John Harrison
14. Thomas Harrison
29. Jane Hill
7. Dorothy Harrison
30. Thomas Temple
15. Elizabeth Mary Temple
31. Elizabeth Myers
