= St Andrew's School, Pangbourne =

St Andrew's School, Berkshire

Location
- Pangbourne, Berkshire, RG8 8QA; England; 51.465634°N 1.133214°W

Information
- Type: Private preparatory school Day and boarding
- Motto: Altiora Petimus (Latin: "We seek higher things")
- Religious affiliation: Church of England
- Established: 1934
- Founder: R. W. Robertson-Glasgow
- Headmaster: Ed Graham
- Staff: 50
- Gender: Coeducational
- Age: 2 to 13
- Enrolment: ~300
- Houses: 4
- Colours: Green, Black and white
- Publication: The Chronicle
- Former pupils: Old St Andrew's (OSAs)
- Website: www.standrewspangbourne.co.uk

St Andrew's School is an independent preparatory school in the hamlet of Buckhold, near Pangbourne, Berkshire, England. Together with its 'Pre-Prep – Early Years' department, the school educates girls and boys aged between three and thirteen. In 2011, there were 266 children at the school, of whom 155 were boys and 111 were girls.

Scholarships are awarded to some children above the age of eleven, based on merit. St Andrew's has a school council to involve children in decisions.

In March 2011 an Independent Schools Inspectorate report endorsed the school's success.

== History ==
The school was founded in 1934 as a boarding school for boys, and consisted of just two staff and eight boys. Historically, as the school grew, boys would leave to go onto schools such as Eton, Harrow and Winchester, however its ties with these schools slowly deteriorated after it first admitted girls in 1971, going on to become fully co-educational. The school's main building, a listed Victorian Gothic country house called Buckhold, which was designed by Alfred Waterhouse in 1885 for Herbert Watney, is set in fifty-four acres of woods and playing fields.

== Catherine, Princess of Wales ==
The school's most famous alumna is Catherine, Princess of Wales. Following her family's return to Berkshire from Amman when she was four years old, Catherine was enrolled at St Andrew's, and she boarded part-weekly at the school in her later years. It was at this school in 1991 that Middleton first saw her future husband, Prince William, when he was part of a Ludgrove School hockey team that came to play a match at Middleton's school.

== Notable former pupils ==
Former students of the school are called "Old St Andrew's", and there is an OSA Association.

- Adrian Liddell Hart, author and adventurer
- Adam Boulton, journalist, broadcaster and author
- John le Carré (David Cornwell), spy fiction writer
- Adam Hart-Davis, broadcaster
- Sir Howard Hodgkin, artist
- Will Lyons (born 1976), journalist, broadcaster and wine writer
- Catherine, Princess of Wales, wife of William, Prince of Wales
- James Middleton, businessman
- Pippa Middleton, events manager, columnist

== Notable former staff ==
- William Anthony Nugent, 13th Earl of Westmeath

== Headmasters ==
- 1934 – 1954: R. W. Robertson-Glasgow
- 1934 – 1945: Bill Ward-Clark
- 1945 – 1975: Jack Llewellyn-Smith
- 1952 – 1970: Rodney Stebbing
- 1949 – 1952: Bill Berkley
- 1975(?)- 1985: Bill Philipps
- 1985 – 1995: Bob Acheson
- 1995 – 2009: Jeremy Snow
- 2009 – 2015: Dr David Livingstone
- 2015 – 2021: Jonathan R. Bartlett
- 2021–Present: Edward Graham
