= Yorkshire Symphony Orchestra =

Orchestra in Leeds, England

The Yorkshire Symphony Orchestra (YSO) is an orchestra based in Leeds, West Yorkshire, England. It was first active from its establishment in 1947 until its demise in 1955, and then revived in 2021. Initially based in the Leeds Town Hall, it is now based at Yeadon Town Hall, on the outskirts of Leeds. Maurice Miles was the orchestra's Principal Conductor, followed by Nicolai Malko.

== Background ==
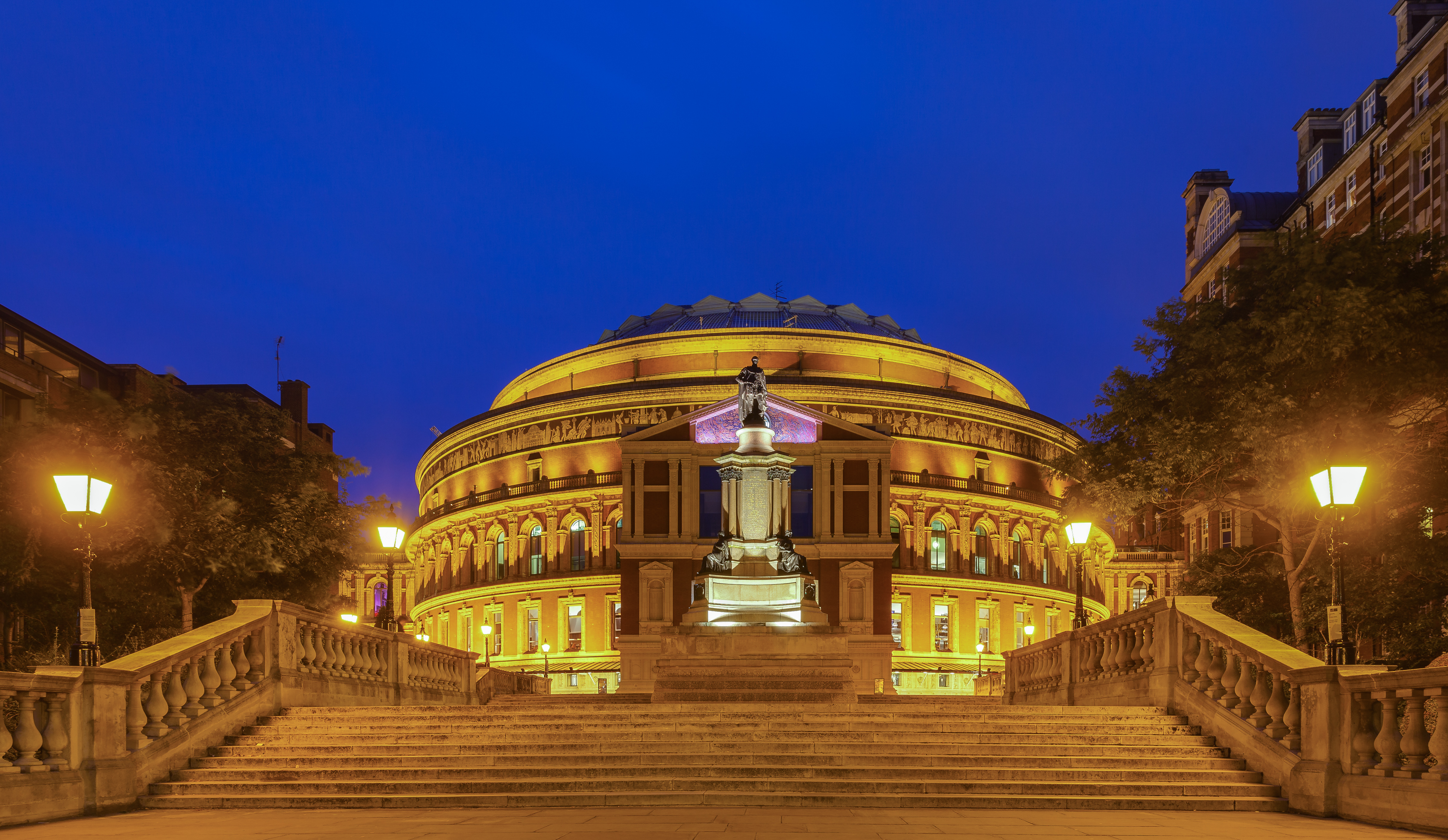
The Yorkshire Symphony Orchestra performed at the Royal Albert Hall in March 1950

The orchestra – YSO – was founded in 1947 by the West Riding of Yorkshire. Funding for the YSO was unique as it was achieved from a multiplicity of local authorities, with notable support from the Leeds Corporation which funded the YSO with £40,000 a year to keep it going with a strength of 50 musicians. Its initial principal conductor was Maurice Miles who remained with the orchestra well into the next decade. The inaugural season of 120 concerts included 60 in Leeds. Over thirty 20th century British works were featured in the season. By 1950, Miles was suggesting to a County Borough of Leeds councillor that the orchestra perform at the Royal Albert Hall.

In March 1950, the Yorkshire Symphony Orchestra gave a performance at the Royal Albert Hall.

At Harewood House on 11 April 1950, Miles reportedly "conducted a section of the Yorkshire Symphony Orchestra before a large and appreciative audience in which the Princess Royal and the Earl and Countess of Harewood were present". Harewood House was the home of both the Princess, an early supporter of the orchestra and her son George Lascelles, 7th Earl of Harewood, patron of the orchestra.

Attending the YSO soirées at Harewood House was Richard Noël Middleton, one of the orchestra's founders. Middleton was the great-grandfather of Catherine, Princess of Wales.

In May 1951, the orchestra performed at the Royal Festival Hall.

Maurice Miles championed the music of British composers in many of his YSO programmes and directed a Festival of British Music in Leeds in 1951 (Festival of Britain year). He had won a scholarship to the Royal Academy of Music in London where he came under the tutelage of conductors such as Sir Henry Wood and Julius Harrison. Miles left his post in Yorkshire to become principal conductor of the City of Belfast Orchestra and in 1966 became the inaugural conductor of the Ulster Orchestra.

In 1953, the film score for Engineers in Steel was composed and recorded by the Yorkshire Symphony Orchestra and conducted by Maurice Miles. The film was about "An introduction to the English Steel Corporation group of companies"; history and activities, examples of their work."

In 1954, Norman Del Mar was conductor of the Yorkshire Symphony Orchestra.

Nicolai Malko, the chief conductor of the Chicago-based Grant Park Orchestra, returned to England in 1954, to take up the post of chief conductor of the Yorkshire Symphony Orchestra, which he held for only one season, 1954–1955, before the orchestra, essentially supported by the rate-payers of Leeds, was disbanded. BBC Radio dramatised in 2014 the YSO's history and demise as Death of an Orchestra featuring Alan Bennett. The orchestra was also the feature of the sequel BBC Radio programme Birth of an Orchestra, which followed the journey of David Taylor as he created the Yorkshire Young Sinfonia (YYS).

== 2021 revival ==
In 2021, local Yorkshire-based conductor Ben Crick, Leeds-based concert promoter Jamie Hudson and sisters Ann and Clair Challenor-Chadwick from Cause UK resurrected the Yorkshire Symphony Orchestra, re-employing professional musicians whose musical careers have been paused during the COVID-19 crisis. The orchestra's home is Yeadon Town Hall and plays engagements throughout Yorkshire, including performances at Harewood House.

Playwright Alan Bennett and poet Ian McMillan are Honorary Patrons of the Yorkshire Symphony Orchestra.

== Principal conductors ==
- Maurice Miles (1947–1953)
- Norman Del Mar (1954)
- Nicolai Malko (1954–1955)
- Ben Crick (2021–)
