= Ashampstead Common =

English common

Coordinates: 51°28′10.8″N 1°10′11.94″W

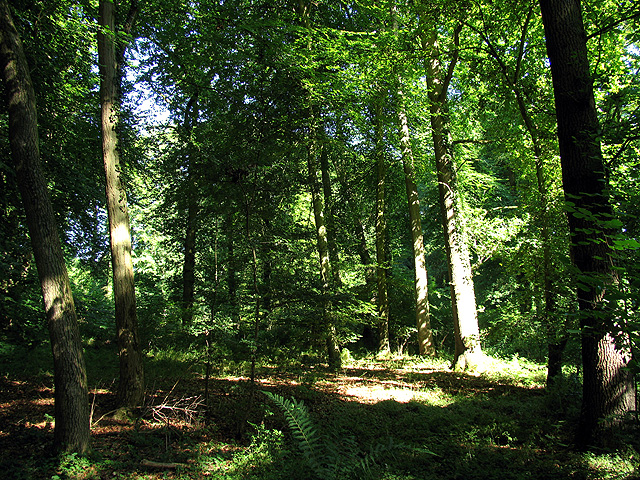
Woods in Ashampstead Common

Ashampstead Common is a common in the English county of Berkshire, within the civil parish of Ashampstead.

The common lies north of the M4 motorway, near to Ashampstead, Lower Basildon and Yattendon.
