= Southend, Berkshire =

Village in Berkshire, England

Coordinates: 51°25′58″N 1°08′32″W

Southend
- Village
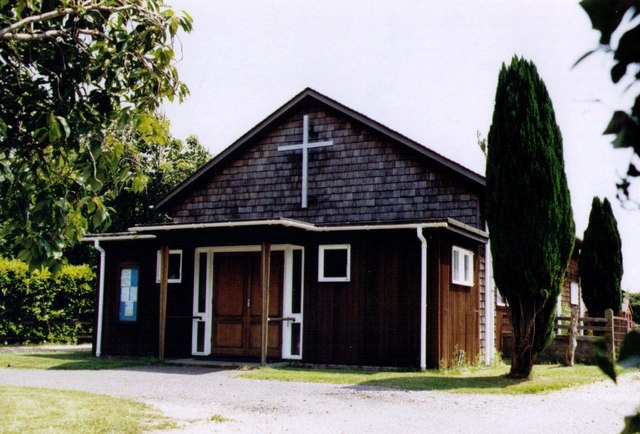
- St Peter's Church, Southend Bradfield

- Location within Berkshire
- Population: 738 (2011 census)
- Civil parish: Bradfield
- Unitary authority: West Berkshire
- Ceremonial county: Berkshire
- Region: South East
- Country: England
- Sovereign state: United Kingdom
- Post town: READING
- Postcode district: RG7
- Dialling code: 0118
- Police: Thames Valley
- Fire: Royal Berkshire
- Ambulance: South Central
- UK Parliament: Newbury

Southend or Bradfield Southend is a village in the west of the civil parish of Bradfield in the West Berkshire district, in the ceremonial county of Berkshire, England. (Note: Upper Bucklebury to Bramfield) Until the 1965 opening of its church it was a hamlet. In the 2011 census it had 738 residents, forming 33.9% of the civil parish's recorded population.

== Church ==
St Peter's Church in Southend, Bradfield is in a shared Church of England parish with Bradfield. Opened in 1965, the church seats 100.

== Transport ==
Buses 41 to and from Thatcham stop several times a day in the village. The nearest railway station is Aldermaston, about 3 miles (4.8 km) by road to the south.

== Governance ==
Administratively it is in West Berkshire, below which the civil parish council is responsible for minor recreational and events amenities, as well as being a statutory force and consultee in the town and country planning local plans and for all applications submitted within its area.

After each Periodic review since its 1885 creation, Southend has consistently been in the Newbury Westminster constituency.

== Demography ==
Excluding outlying farms and cottages of Bradfield, Southend, often shown on maps as Bradfield Southend, comprised two Output Areas of the 2011 census. The number of households who had no car or van was 5.7% divided as follows:

Output Area	Households with Cars/Vans	Households without	% without	Population 2011 Census	Area
E00082166 (east half)	130	14	10.7%	388	61 hectares (150 acres)
E00082167 (west half)	135	1	0.7%	350	57 hectares (140 acres)

== Notable residents ==
Sisters Catherine and Pippa Middleton lived here with their family throughout the 1980s.
