= Henry Dübs =

German-born British engineer

Henry Dübs (1816 – 24 April 1876), was a 19th century German-born engineer and shipbuilder in Scotland.

== Early life ==
Born Heinrich Dübs in Guntersblum near Darmstadt in the then Rhenish Hesse section of south-west Germany, he emigrated to Great Britain and founded Dübs & Company, at one time the second largest locomotive manufacturer in Britain.

Dübs was apprenticed to a machine tooling business around 1830. At the age of 21, having gained further experience in Mainz and Aachen, he had become a machine shop manager.

== Britain ==
=== Vulcan Foundry ===
In 1842 he moved to England and was appointed as works manager of the Vulcan Foundry near Warrington. in 1842, at which time he anglicised his name to Henry Dübs.

=== Beyer Peacock ===
From around 1843 to 1857 Dübs appears to have worked for the Lancashire locomotive builders Beyer, Peacock & Company in Manchester. He lost his position as works manager in 1857 for reasons which may have had to do with his managerial style rather than his technical abilities.

=== Neilson and Company ===
In 1858 Dübs was appointed works manager and company partner at the Clydeside engineers and locomotive builders, Neilson & Company, in place of the existing works manager, James Reid, on the strength of his knowledge of locomotive building. Neilson & Company were at that time changing from being a general engineering concern into specialist locomotive builders.

Neilson realised that he needed "a manager for my works who had some name and reputation for this department of engineering . . . At this time a german (sic) Henry Dubs was strongly recommended to me, as a man in great favour and estimation by locomotive superintendents, and as likely to be of great value to me. Dubs was out of employment, and pressed memuch for the situation". "I made Mr Dubs a partner, it having been always a principle with me that those whom I employed in any undertaking should not only have a sufficient salary, but also an interest in the undertaking".

Neilson rapidly grew disenchanted with Dubs who "turned out to be an excellent draughtsman, but was a poor engineer". Neilson judged him to be "a most pig headed german (sic) and a most difficult man to get along with". "Dubs made himself so excessively disagreeable and having offered to give up his partnership and leave the works upon my paying him a certain sum of money which I accepted".

=== Dübs and Company ===
In 1863 Dübs surrendered his partnership in Neilson & Company and set up his own locomotive building company. Walter Neilson stipulated that it should no closer than three miles to his new Hyde Park Works in Springburn, Glasgow; accordingly, Dübs chose a site in Queens Park in Polmadie on the south side of Glasgow, which began business as the Glasgow Works in 1864.

Dübs' new company, Dübs & Company, soon proved successful. Despite disagreements with Walter Neilson of Neilson & Company, Dübs had managed to inspire sufficient loyalty that a number of workers left Neilson to work for him, including Neilson's chief draughtsman. Additionally, a number of Neilson's customers began placing orders with Dübs.

Dubs received his first foreign orders in 1866, for the unusual Ottoman Railway Company traction engine and East Indian Railway Company locomotives. The list of countries to which engines were subsequently sold is as impressive as Neilson’s.

Although making locomotives was its main business, Dübs & Company also manufactured traction engines and steam cranes. His company is further notable in that it was the first to employ women in its drawing office (from 1866).

== Death ==
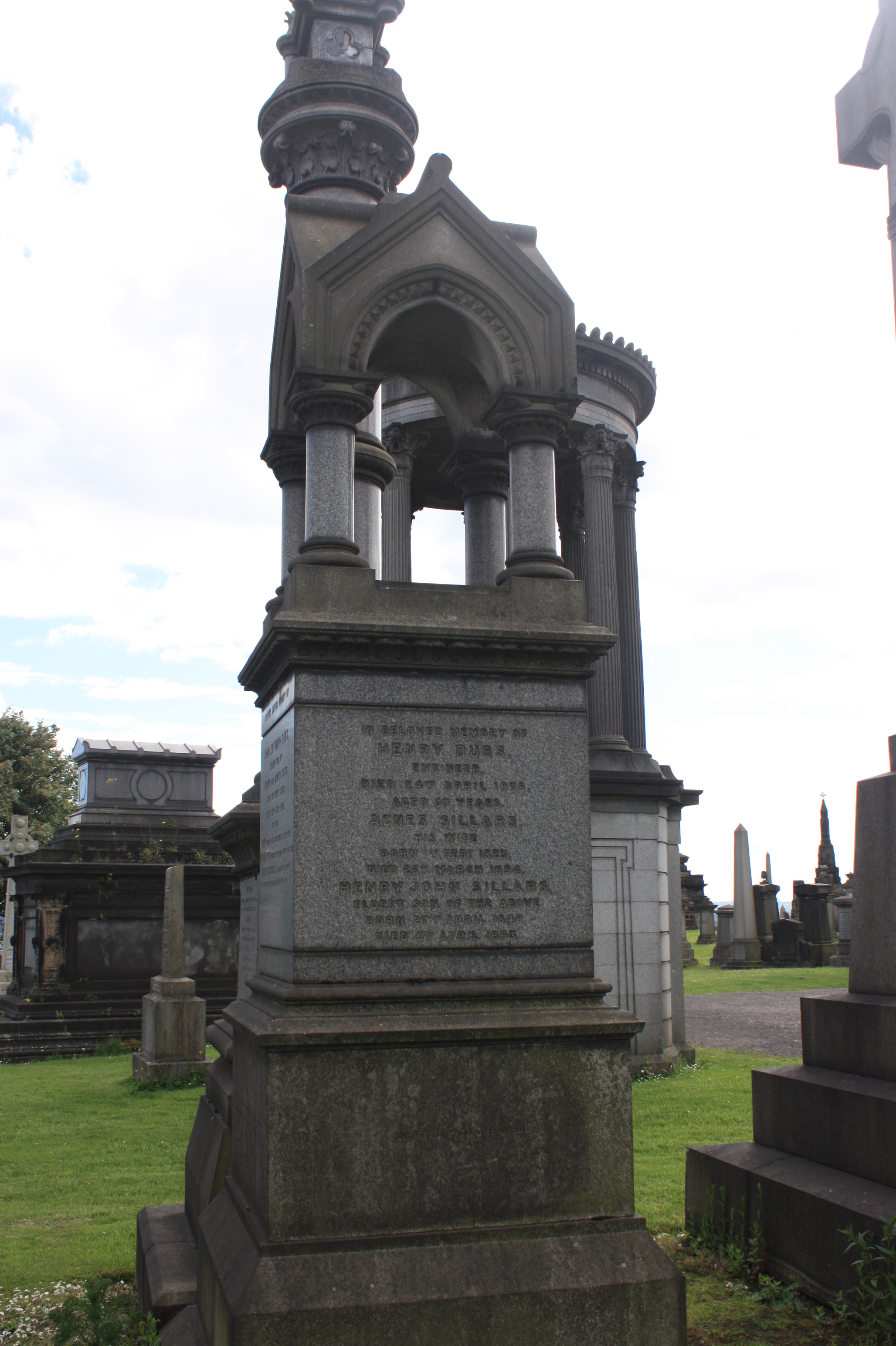
The grave of Henry Dubs, Glasgow Necropolis

In later life Dubs lived at 2 Wellesley Place in Glasgow.

Henry Dübs died of pancreatic cancer in 1876, at the age of 60. He is buried near the summit of Glasgow Necropolis with his wife Agnes Sillars (1823-1894).

He was succeeded as managing partner by Sir William Lorimer (1844-1922) who had joined the company in 1864. Lorimer held this position until 1903.

== Company merger ==
Following Dübs' death, the company expanded its export business and in 1903 merged with Manchester locomotive builders, Sharp, Stewart & Company and Neilson, Reid & Company to become the North British Locomotive Company. At the time Dübs & Company were the second largest locomotive manufacturer in Britain. The amalgamated company was the largest locomotive builder in the world outside of the United States, employing 7,570 men and capable of building 600 locomotives a year.
