= Bucklebury Manor =

Manor in Bucklebury, West Berkshire, England

- Location within Berkshire
- 51°25′37″N 1°12′03″W

History
- Built: 1830s
- Built for: Winchcombe Henry Howard Hartley

Site notes
- Architectural style: Regency

Listed Building – Grade II
- Official name: The Manor
- Designated: 29 November 1983
- Reference no.: 1212907

Bucklebury Manor is a Grade II listed manor house in the civil parish of Bucklebury in the English county of Berkshire. Since 2012, it has been the home of Michael and Carole Middleton, parents of Catherine, Princess of Wales.

== History ==
=== Manorial status ===
The land on which the house stands was part of the Bucklebury Estate, belonging to the Winchcombe family and their descendants for many generations. In 1830, their home, Bucklebury House, was gutted by fire and demolished shortly afterwards, leaving only servants' quarters and associated outbuildings standing. In the mid-1830s, Winchcombe Henry Howard Hartley had a smaller Georgian manor house built on the higher ground immediately south of the old house, calling it 'The Cottage'.

The Hartley family then mostly lived on their estates in Gloucestershire. However, shortly before these were sold in 1906, the chief heiress to the estates, Mrs Nina Webley-Parry, moved to the Cottage and renamed it 'Bucklebury Manor'.

=== Post-manorial house ===
The Winchcombe descendants finally left the Manor and it ceased to be the local manor house when Major Derrick Hartley Russell restored the buildings at old Bucklebury House in 1957.

In 2012, Bucklebury Manor and its eighteen acres of grounds were purchased by Michael and Carole Middleton, the parents of Catherine, Princess of Wales.

== Architecture ==
The Georgian Bucklebury Manor contains within its interior an early C17 ashlar fireplace that is carved with panelled pilasters that support a rich cornice. There is also an over-mantel with shallow carved decoration, and a moulded flat arch with Delft type glazed tiles behind. There are seven bedrooms. Bucklebury Manor has been listed as Grade II by English Heritage since 29 November 1983.

== Location ==
Bucklebury Manor is located at Pease Hill in Bucklebury, a village in West Berkshire. The house's surrounding estate covers 18 acres.
