= Kitson (surname) =

Kitson is an English surname first found in Yorkshire. Notable people with the surname include:

- Albert Ernest Kitson (1868–1937), British-Australian geologist and naturalist
- Albert Kitson (1863–1944), British peer
- Alec Kitson (1921–1997), British trade unionist
- Alison Kitson, British health scientist and nursing leader
- Arthur Kitson (1859–1937), British monetary theorist and inventor
- Arthur Octavius Kitson (1848–1915), British biographer of Captain James Cook
- Barry Kitson, British comics artist
- Charles Herbert Kitson (1874–1944), English organist, teacher and music educator
- Daniel Kitson (born 1977), British comedian
- Dave Kitson (born 1980), English former footballer
- David Kitson (1925–2002), English cricketer
- Frank Kitson (1926–2024), British Army officer and writer on military subjects
- Harold Kitson (1874–1951), South African tennis player
- Henry Kitson (1877–1952), Royal Navy officer
- Henry Hudson Kitson (died 1947), English-American sculptor
- James Kitson (1835–1911), British politician
- Jessie Beatrice Kitson (1876–1965), Lord Mayor of Leeds
- Jill Kitson (1939–2013), Australian radio broadcaster and literary journalist
- Joey Kitson (born 1969), Canadian musician and lead singer of the band Rawlins Cross
- John Kitson (1818–1907), English cricketer
- John William Kitson (1846–1888), English architectural sculptor
- Ken Kitson (born 1946), British actor
- Norma Kitson (1933–2002), South African political activist
- Oliver Kitson (1915–1996), British peer
- Paul Kitson (born 1971), English former footballer
- Peter Kitson (born 1958), British academic and author
- Robert Hawthorn Kitson (1873–1947), British painter
- Roland Kitson (1882–1958), British businessman
- Simon Kitson (born c. 1967), British historian
- Suzie Kitson (born 1969), English woman test cricketer
- Syd Kitson (born 1958), American football guard
- Theo Alice Ruggles Kitson (1871–1932), American sculptor
- Thomas Kitson (1485–1540), English merchant
- Timothy Kitson (1931–2019), British politician
