= Kitson =

Kitson may refer to:

People with the surname Kitson:

- Kitson (surname)

== Other ==
- Kitsonville, West Virginia, an unincorporated community, United States
- Kitson & Co., locomotive builders
- Kitson Meyer, an articulated locomotive
- Kitson (store), fashion boutique with stores in Los Angeles, California, United States

== See also ==
- Kittson (disambiguation)
