= Ufford =

Ufford may refer to the following places in England:

- Ufford, Cambridgeshire
- Ufford, Suffolk
