= Edith Cliff =

Commandant

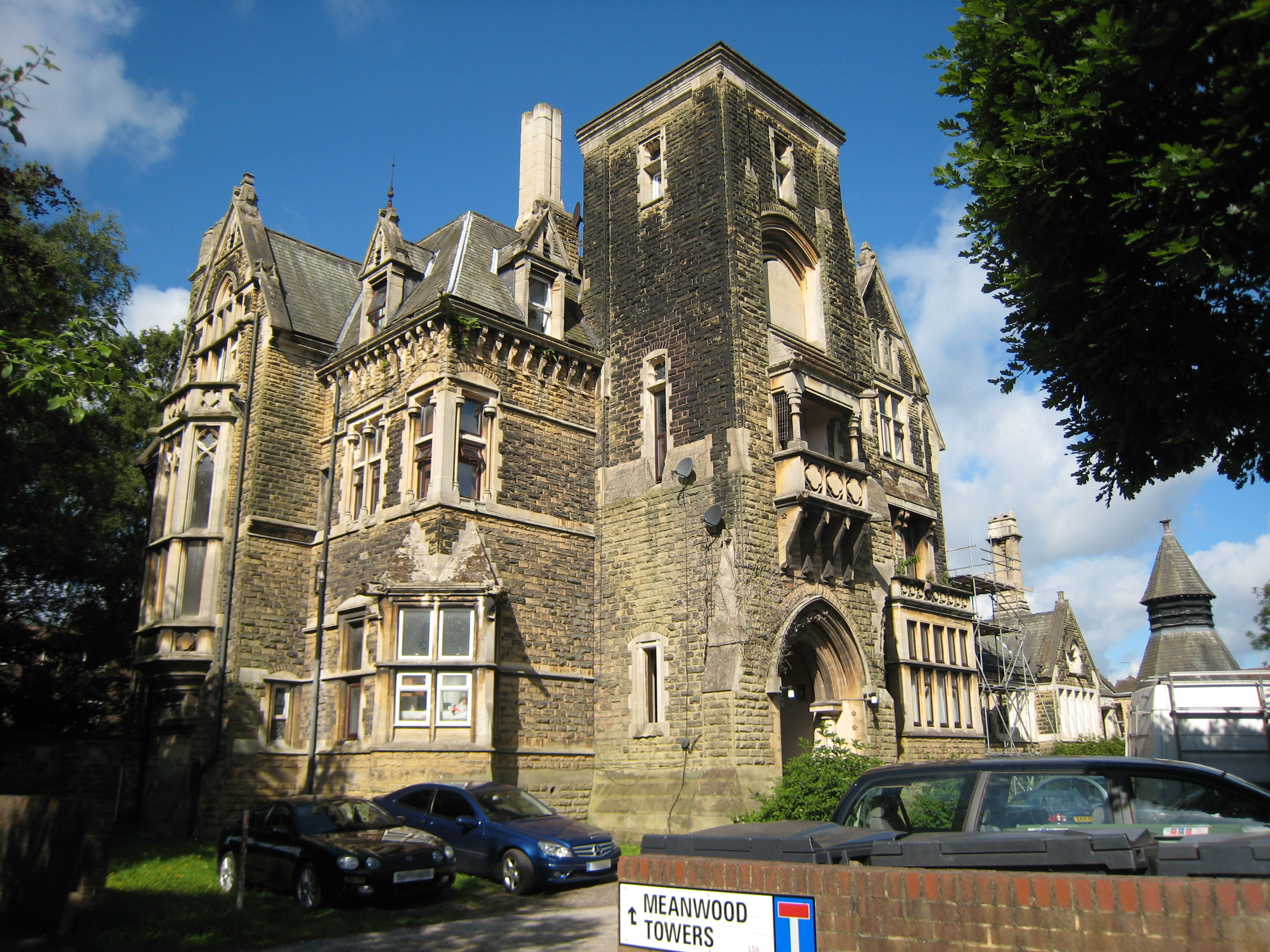
Meanwood Towers, birthplace of Edith Cliff

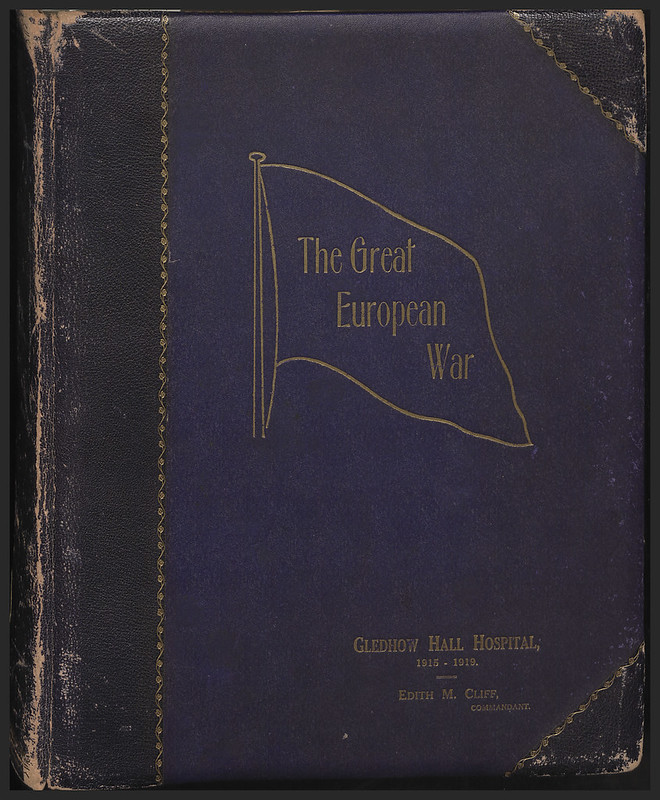
Front cover of scrapbook compiled by Edith Cliff during the First World War.

Edith Cliff, OBE, (1871–1962) was the Commandant of Gledhow Hall Military Hospital in Gledhow, Leeds, Yorkshire, England from its opening in 1915, throughout the First World War until it closed 1919.

Edith Maud Cliff, daughter of William Dewhirst Cliff of Meanwood Towers in Leeds was born in 1871. A woman of independent means, she began to train as a Voluntary Aid Detachment (VAD) nurse in 1911. After the outbreak of the First World War, her cousin Albert Kitson, 2nd Baron Airedale offered his home, Gledhow Hall, for use as a VAD hospital. It opened in 1915 and Cliff was appointed its commandant, that is, officer in charge, a position she held throughout the war. Cliff was awarded an OBE in the 1919 New Year Honours for her service.

Cliff's scrapbook, The Great European War, Gledhow Hall Hospital, documents life there between 1915 and 1919 in letters, photographs and newscuttings. Leeds Libraries consider this one of the treasures of their collection, along with a 1480 Book of Hours.

In 1935 Edith Cliff married Sir Thomas Willans Nussey, a barrister and Liberal Party Member of Parliament until 1910. They were in their mid-60s when they married.

Edith Cliff, Lady Nussey, died aged 90 in 1962. Her husband had predeceased her by 15 years.
