= Joyce Dennys =

English cartoonist, illustrator and painter (1893–1991)

- Born: Isobel Dorothy Joyce Dennys; 14 August 1893; India
- Died: 22 February 1991 (aged 97); Camden, London, England
- Citizenship: United Kingdom
- Education: Princess Helena College; Exeter Art School
- Occupations: Cartoonist; Illustrator; Painter
- Years active: 1916–1986
- Spouse: Tom Evans (m. 1919–1965)
- Children: 2

Isobel Dorothy Joyce Dennys (14 August 1893 – 23 February 1991) was an English cartoonist, illustrator and painter. She worked for the Voluntary Aid Detachment during the First World War and designed and created recruitment posters for both it and the Women's Royal Naval Service. Dennys spent 1919 and 1921 working in Australia before returning to England in 1921. She contributed humorous illustrations in the form of sketches and strip cartoons to journals and illustrated a series of books. Dennys also published plays catered primarily for amateurs and provided the cover illustrations to many of them. She took up oil painting at age 70 and she authored her autobiography in 1983. Examples of her oil paintings are held by three museums and a blue plaque has been installed at her Budleigh Salterton home since April 2015 to commemorate her life.

== Early life ==
On 14 August 1893, Dennys was born in either Murree or Shimla in India, then a part of the British Empire. She was the daughter of the Indian Staff Corps captain Charles John Dennys who was stationed in the country and his wife, the Scottish-born housewife Lucy Winewood (née Tulloch). Dennys relocated from India to Eastbourne with her three older siblings and mother in 1896. She attended kindergarten in Eastbourne and went to Eastbourne Ladies' College. Following the retirement of her father to Budleigh Salterton, Devon, Dennys boarded at Ealing's Princess Helena College from 1909 to 1912. She excelled in art and sport, both of which were noted in the school magazine. Dennys then studied at Exeter Art School. During the First World War, she served in the Voluntary Aid Detachment (VAD) as a member of the Joint War Committee of the British Red Cross Society and the Order of St John at Budleigh Salterton Auxiliary Hospital in the local Budleigh Salterton hospital nursing wounded soldiers between December 1914 and December 1915. Dennys then served at the larger No. 2 Exeter Military Hospital from January 1916 to October 1916. She also studied at the London School of Art, and worked for the Joint War Committee at its Devonshire House headquarters.

== Career ==
During her period in Exeter, she designed and created recruitment posters for both the VAD in 1915 and the Women's Royal Naval Service when it was established two years later. Dennys was commissioned to create a series of pictures for three editions of the book Our Hospital ABC that was written by Hampden Gordon and MC Tindall published by John Lane for both the 1916 and 1917 Christmas periods. She illustrated the set of rhymes about the YMCA called Our Girls in War Time and Rhymes of the Red Triangle for the Christmases of both 1917 and 1918. In May 1918, some of Dennys' pictures were exhibited by the Ridley Art Club at the Grafton Galleries to aid the Serbian Red Cross Society.

Following the First World War, she moved to Kyogle, Richmond River, New South Wales in 1919. Dennys was in high demand in the state and her works were frequently exhibited at the New South Wales Society of Artists and the Salon of Fine Art, Sydney. Her work was accepted by The Bulletin and her drawings were reproduced by Art of Australia in July 1919 and in each of the March 1921, August 1921 and September 1921 issues of Home. Dennys had an unhappy experience in Australia and returned to Budleigh Salterton in 1921. She continued to work as an artist, exhibiting pictures of her time in Australia at the Suffolk Street Galleries by the Ridley Art Club that October. Dennys provided cover illustrations for Mills and Boon as well as other publishers and illustrated works for others such as the 1926 book A Winter Sports Alphabet.

She also contributed humorous illustrations in the form of sketches and strip cartoons to journals such as Harper's Bazaar, Punch and The Sketch and worked commercially such as doing advertisements for Abdulla cigarettes. Dennys authored and illustrated a trilogy of short series concerning the difficulties of doctors wives' in Mrs Dose the Doctor's Wife (1930), Repeated Doses (1931), and The Over-Dose. The latter book introduced the character of Henrietta Spatula, a heroine created for The Sketch, and several of her drawings from the book Mrs Dose the Doctor's Wife were exhibited at the Foyle Art Gallery in late 1930. In 1932, Dennys was illustrator for the Beverley Nichols book For Adults Only. She and V.C. Clinton-Baddeley published her first play, The Cup That Cheers, in 1934. Dennys wrote the play Rain Before Seven about an young English wife's loneliness in Australia and provided Maurice Denham's London stage debut in 1936.

Throughout the Second World War, she illustrated the works of several Rodney Bennett children's books. Dennys also contributed illustrations of letters to humorous articles from Heniretta for The Sketch from October 1939 to August 1946. She went on to contribute further letters by Henrietta between January 1954 to March 1955, and from March to October 1955, preceding a series of vignettes about a duo of town-dwellers who relocated to the country. In 1947, Dennys' play The Bells Ring on a country doctor's life was first performed followed by The End of the Song on the West Country's changing social reflection two years later. She continued to write a variety of plays catered mainly for amateurs and frequently supplied the cover illustrations to Samuel French and H. F. W. Deane between the late 1940s to the early 1960s.

At age 70, Dennys took up oil painting, firstly painting flowers and then pictures of Budleigh Salterton. Examples of these works are held by Budleigh Salterton Town Council, the Fairlynch Museum and the Imperial War Museum. In 1983, Dennys' autobiography, And Then There Was One, was published by Tabb House. Parts of the Henrietta letters were republished by Deutsch in two collections Henrietta's War: News From the Home Front, 1939–1942 and Henrietta Sees It Through in the mid-1980s.

== Personal life ==
Dennys was married to the doctor of medicine Thomas Charles Cann (Tom) Evans from 2 January 1919 until his death in 1965. They had two children. On 23 February 1991, Dennys died at her home in Camden, London.

== Legacy ==
Alison Bailey wrote of Dennys: "Between the wars Dennys flourished as an illustrator of the works of others and was well known as a contributor of humorous illustrations to magazines before turning to writing her own works in the 1930s. Her lasting reputation rests on her ability, during the First and Second World Wars, to capture the spirit of the times. The vivacity and gently mocking humour of her wartime illustrations and letters have each proved as attractive to later generations as to her contemporary readers."

In April 2015, following a campaign, a blue plaque was installed at her residence in Budleigh Salterton to commemorate her life. For that year, Dennys' paintings of Budleigh Salterton were put online by the BBC in partnership with the Public Catalogue Foundation since several works held by Fairlynch Museum were included in the national collection. A planned exhibition of her work by Fairlynch Museum was abandoned due to "unforeseen circumstances" in January 2016. The British Red Cross and Museum holds a hand written note accompanied by drawings from the First World War by Dennys in its collection.

== Books ==
- Dennys, Joyce; Evoe (1926). A Winter Sports Alphabet. London: John Lane.
- Dennys, Joyce (1930). Mrs Dose – The Doctor's Wife. London: John Lane.
- Dennys, Joyce (1983). And then there was one. Padstow: Tabb House.
- Dennys, Joyce (1985). Henrietta's War: News from the home front 1939 to 1942. Deutsch. ISBN 0233978291.
- Dennys, Joyce (1986). Henrietta sees it through: More news from the home front – 1942 to 1945. Deutsch. ISBN 0233979700.
