= Gledhow Hall =

Country house in Leeds, West Yorkshire, England

Coordinates: 53°49′44″N 1°31′19″W

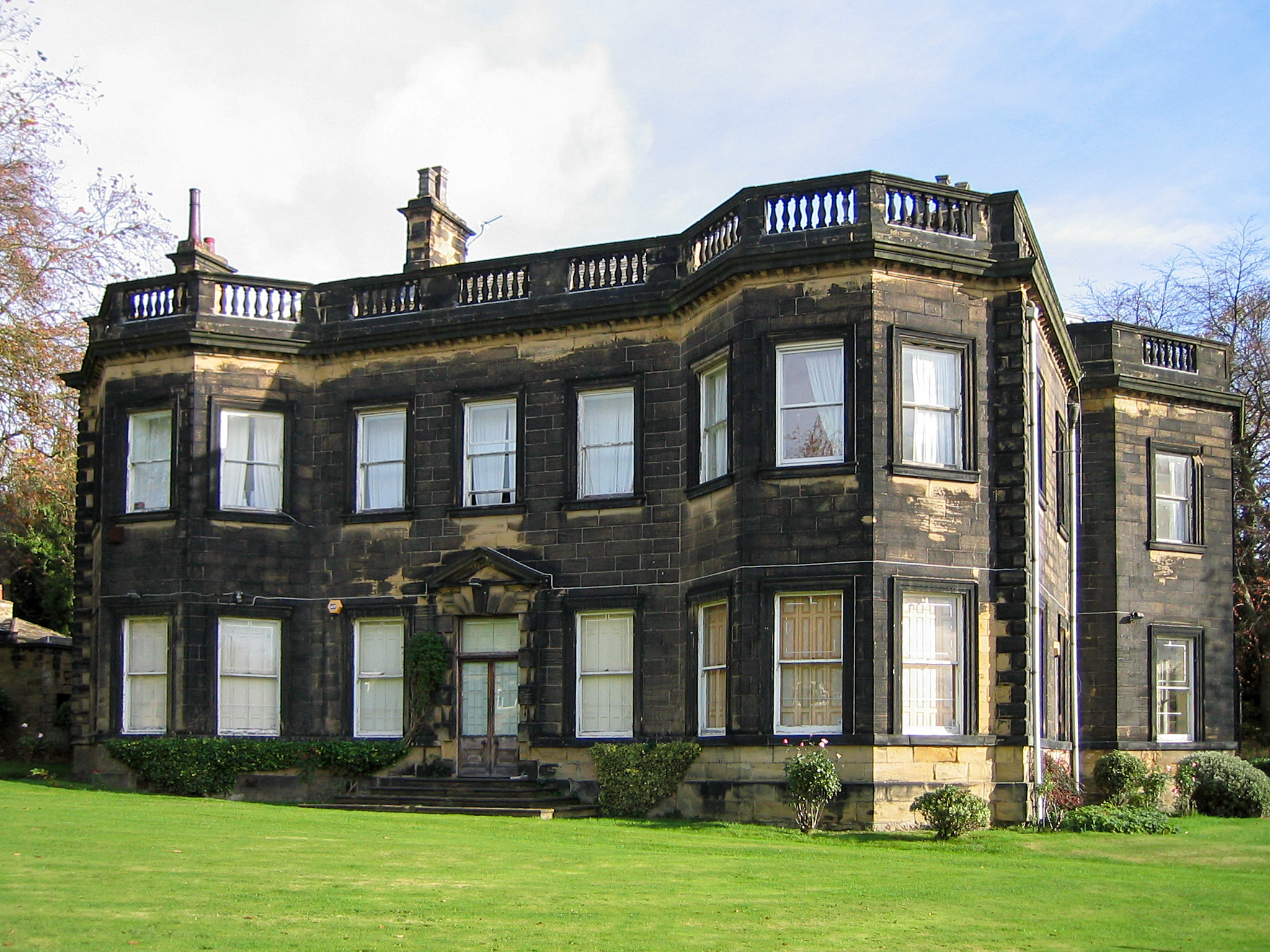
Gledhow Hall, 2007

Gledhow Hall is an English country house in Gledhow, Leeds, West Yorkshire, rebuilt for Jeremiah Dixon in 1764, by the Yorkshire architect John Carr. It is a Grade II* listed building.

== History ==
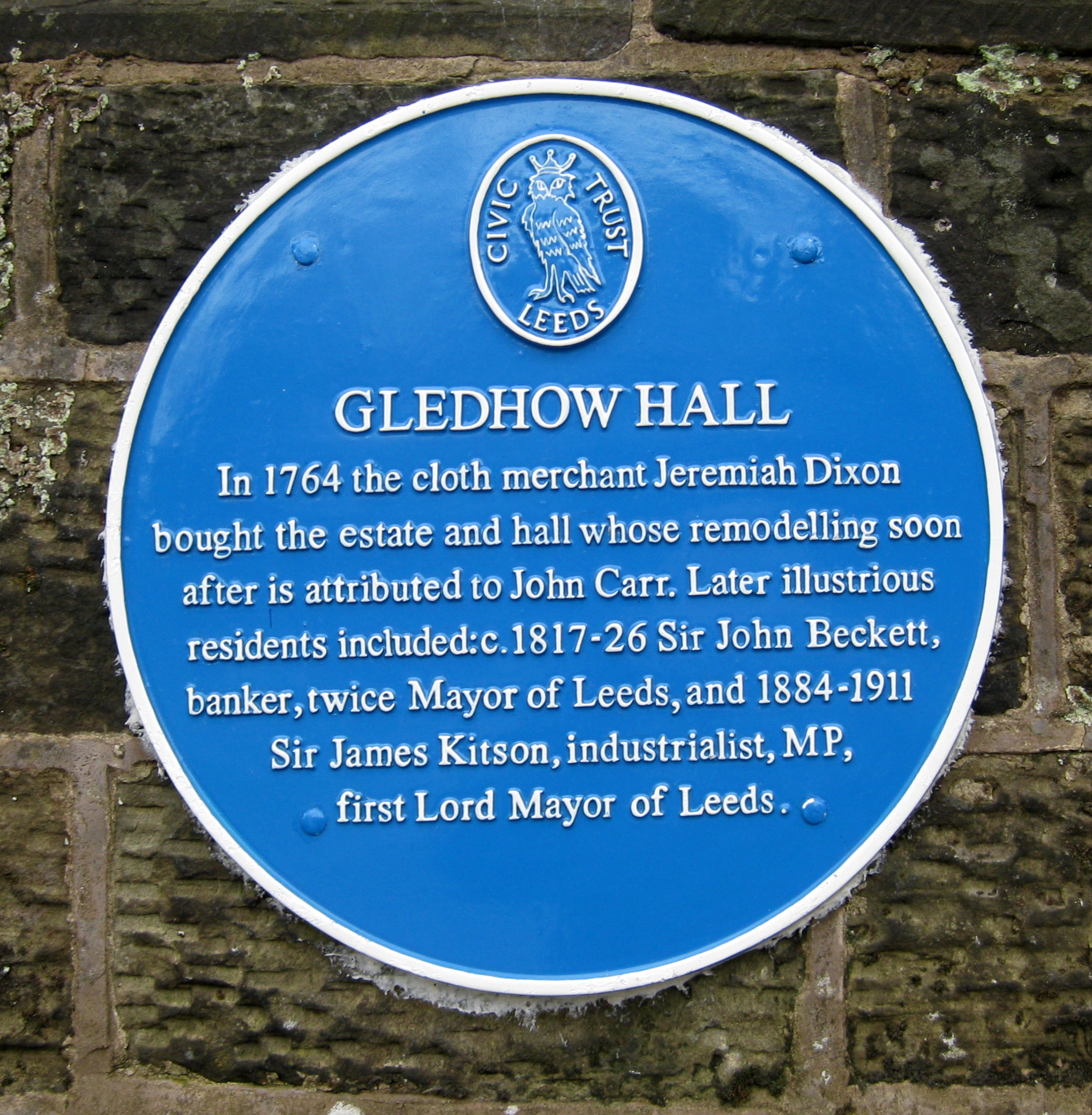
Civic Trust plaque

Gledhow Hall is built on former monastic land that belonged to Kirkstall Abbey. The abbey was the major landowner in the Allerton area in the 13th century. The abbey lands were seized by the Crown in 1539 at the Dissolution of the Monasteries. John Thwaites bought the land and built a house in the 17th century.

Jeremiah Dixon bought Gledhow Hall in 1764. He engaged John Carr, who extensively remodelled the hall and estate over three years to 1767.

J. M. W. Turner painted a watercolour view of the hall in about 1816, staying at the house while he made preparatory sketches.

By 1885, James Kitson, 1st Baron Airedale, industrial magnate, founder of the Kitson Airedale locomotive foundries and notable figure in the Liberal party, had purchased the hall from Samuel Croft and was living there. The hall was altered and extended by Leeds architects, Chorley and Connon between 1885 and 1890.

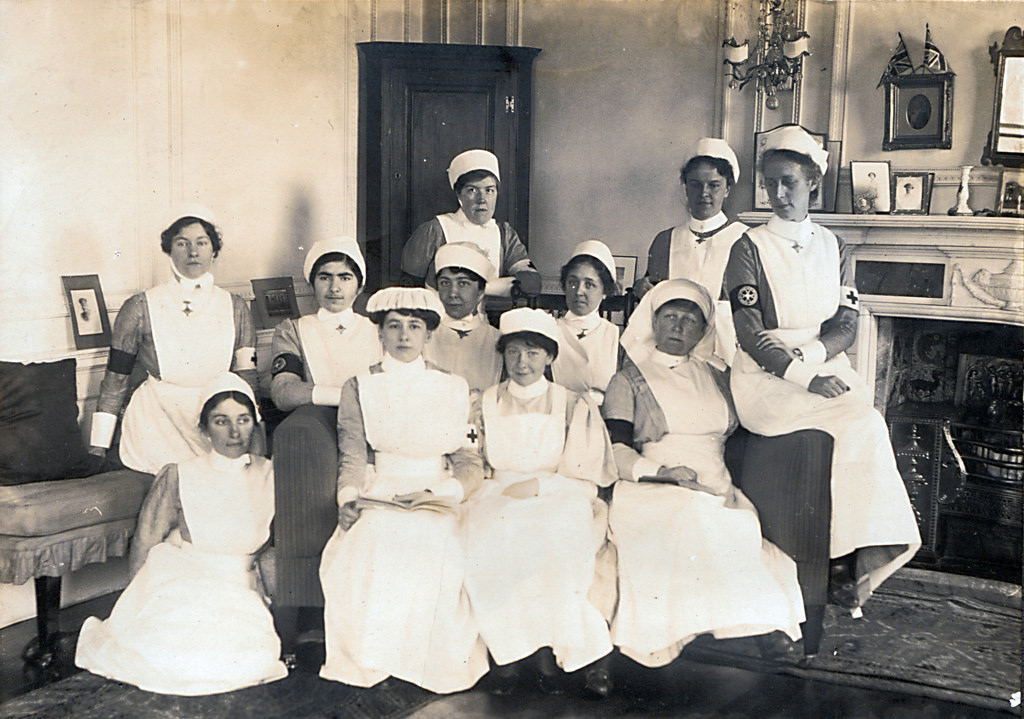
Gledhow Hall in 1915, Olive Middleton, far right next to Edith Cliff, Doris Kitson is centre row third left.

Albert Kitson, 2nd Baron Airedale succeeded to the title and the estate on his father's death in 1911. After the outbreak of the First World War, Lord Airedale offered the hall for use as a Voluntary Aid Detachment (VAD) hospital. Run by the British Red Cross, it was staffed by both professional and VAD nurses. The hospital opened in 1915 and his cousin Edith Cliff was its commandant (officer in charge) throughout the war. She kept a scrapbook, The Great European War, Gledhow Hall Hospital, documenting life there between 1915 and 1919.

The scrapbook, filled with "photographs, newscuttings, letters and ephemera" is held by Leeds Libraries as one of its most important treasures. The scrapbook was chosen for the UK-wide Digital War Memorial, hosted by Historypin, a user-generated archive in 2014. Community groups from local libraries, guided by an artist, worked to "find the voice" of the scrapbook and explore themes around it, visited and photographed Gledhow Hall including its faience bathroom.

== Description ==
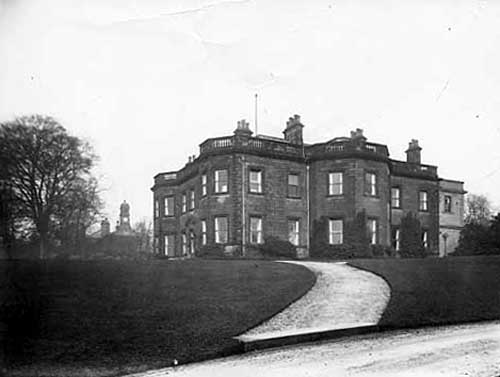
Gledhow Hall c. 1890

The two-storey house is built in stone ashlar, with chamfered quoins, cornices, a balustraded parapet, and a hipped roof in slate and lead with a tall chimney stack. The south front has two two-storey canted bay windows with three sash windows between them. The centrally-placed doorway has a Gibbs surround, a fanlight and a pediment and is accessed by stone steps. The extension by Chorley and Connon at the rear has three bays, two pairs of Ionic columns forming a loggia, and a porch in the corner with Tuscan columns, over which is an oriel window.

The main entrance through the rear loggia has paired panelled doors glazed in stained glass with fruit and butterfly motifs. The entrance hall has mosaic floor and has been partition for flats. The stone cantilevered staircase has a wrought-iron scrolled balustrade and a mahogany handrail. The top-lit stair well retains eight lunette windows, each with stained glass representing foliage, flowers and fruit. On the first floor is the tiled bathroom from 1885. The elaborate faience (glazed architectural terra-cotta) bathroom in Burmantofts Pottery was created for a visit from the Prince of Wales. The bathroom has panelled mahogany doors and a bolection moulded fireplace. The walls are covered with moulded tiles in brown, blue and white, with a dado, moulded rail, scrolled frieze and a dentilled cornice. The ceiling is tiled in a strapwork design and has three diamond-shaped vents. The adjacent toilet is similarly decorated.

Jeremiah Dixon built the bridge over Gledhow Lane to the pleasure gardens in 1768, and the Gledhow ice-house. Dixon planted large scale plantations, introducing Swiss or Aphernously Pine, which became known as the Gledhow Pine.

== See also ==
- Grade II* listed buildings in West Yorkshire
- Listed buildings in Leeds (Roundhay Ward)
