= Voluntary Aid Detachment =

Voluntary unit of the British Empire

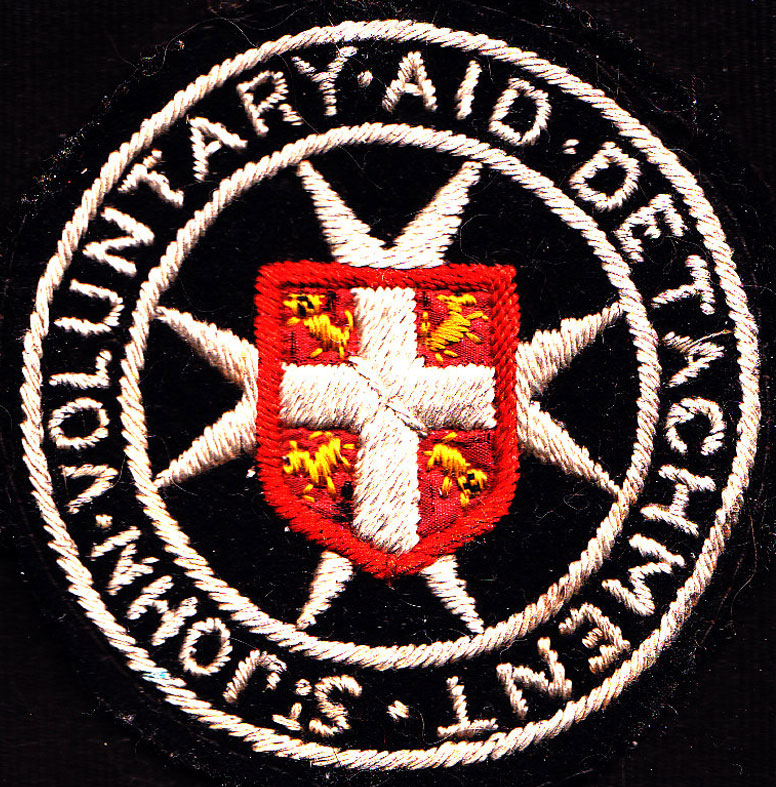
St John's VAD cloth embroidered insignia (1916)

The Voluntary Aid Detachment (VAD) was a voluntary unit of civilians providing nursing care for military personnel in the United Kingdom and various other countries in the British Empire. The most important periods of operation for these units occurred during World War I and World War II. Although intimately bound up in the war effort, VAD volunteers were not military nurses, as they did not come under the control of the military, unlike the Queen Alexandra's Royal Army Nursing Corps, the Princess Mary's Royal Air Force Nursing Service, and the Queen Alexandra's Royal Naval Nursing Service. VAD nurses worked in field hospitals, i.e., close to the battlefield, and in longer-term places of recuperation in Britain.

== World War I ==
First World War recruitment poster for Voluntary Aid Detachments

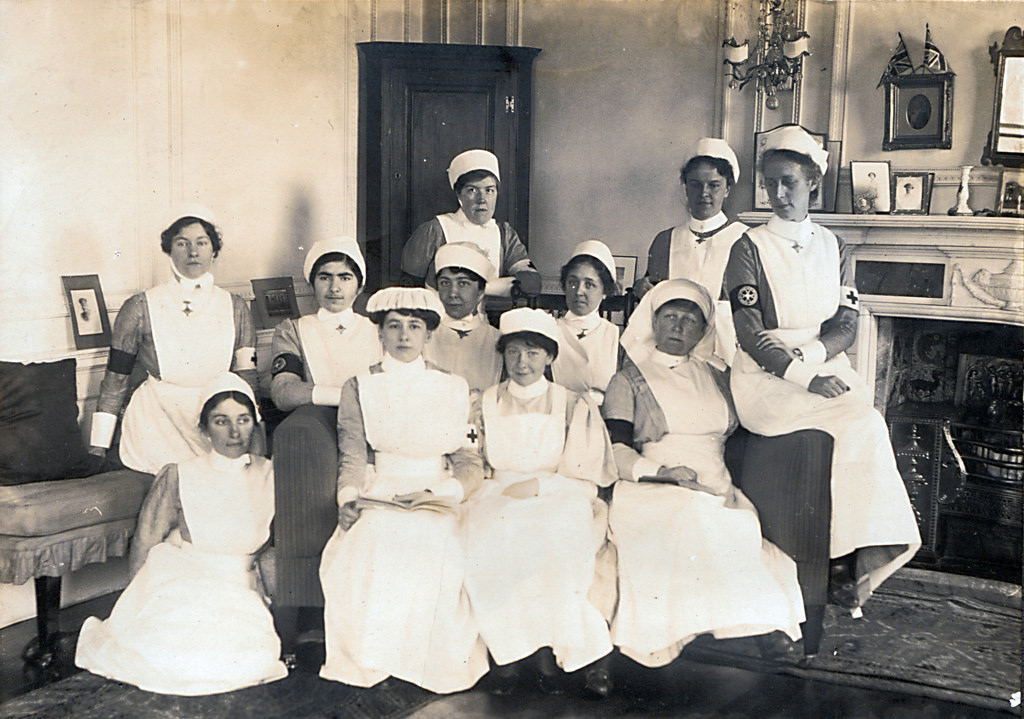
VAD nurse Olive Middleton, back row far right, in 1915 at Gledhow Hall, the estate of her cousin Baroness Airedale

The VAD system was founded in 1909 by the British Red Cross and Order of St John at the request of the War Office. By the summer of 1914 there were over 2,500 Voluntary Aid Detachments in Britain. Of the 74,000 VAD members in 1914, two-thirds were women and girls. In August 1914, just after the outbreak of war in Europe, the British Red Cross and the Order of St John proposed to form a Joint War Organisation with the intention of working with common aims, reducing duplication of effort and providing St John personnel with the protection of the Red Cross; an agreement was concluded on 24 October 1914.

At the outbreak of the First World War, VAD members eagerly offered their service to the war effort. The British Red Cross was reluctant to allow civilian women a role in overseas hospitals: most volunteers were of the middle and upper classes and unaccustomed to hardship and traditional hospital discipline. Military authorities would not accept VADs at the front line. Initially, the VADs were officially recorded as being assigned to the one hospital, but as time went on, they also worked - often unofficially and only for a few days at a time - at a number of hospitals in their local area, potentially providing a continuity of care to certain patients when hospital transfers occurred.

Katharine Furse took two VADs to France in October 1914, restricting them to serve as canteen workers and cooks. Caught under fire in a sudden battle the VADs were pressed into emergency hospital service and acquitted themselves well. The growing shortage of trained nurses opened the door for VADs in overseas military hospitals. Furse was appointed commander-in-chief of the detachments and restrictions were removed. Female volunteers over the age of twenty-three and with more than three months' hospital experience were accepted for overseas service.

By 1916 the military hospitals at home were employing about 8,000 trained nurses with about 126,000 beds, and there were 4,000 nurses abroad with 93,000 beds. By 1918 there were about 80,000 VAD members: 12,000 nurses working in the military hospitals and 60,000 unpaid volunteers working in auxiliary hospitals of various kinds. Some of the volunteers had a snobbish attitude towards the paid nurses.

VADs were an uneasy addition to military hospitals' rank and order. They lacked the advanced skill and discipline of trained professional nurses and were often critical of the nursing profession. Relations improved as the war stretched on: VAD members increased their skill and efficiency and trained nurses were more accepting of the VADs' contributions. During four years of war 38,000 VADs worked in hospitals and served as ambulance drivers and cooks. VADs served near the Western Front and in Mesopotamia and Gallipoli. VAD hospitals were also opened in most large towns in Britain. Later, VADs were also sent to the Eastern Front. They provided an invaluable source of bedside aid in the war effort. Many were decorated for distinguished service.

At the end of the war, the leaders of the nursing profession agreed that untrained VADs should not be allowed onto the newly established register of nurses.

== Notable VAD nurses ==
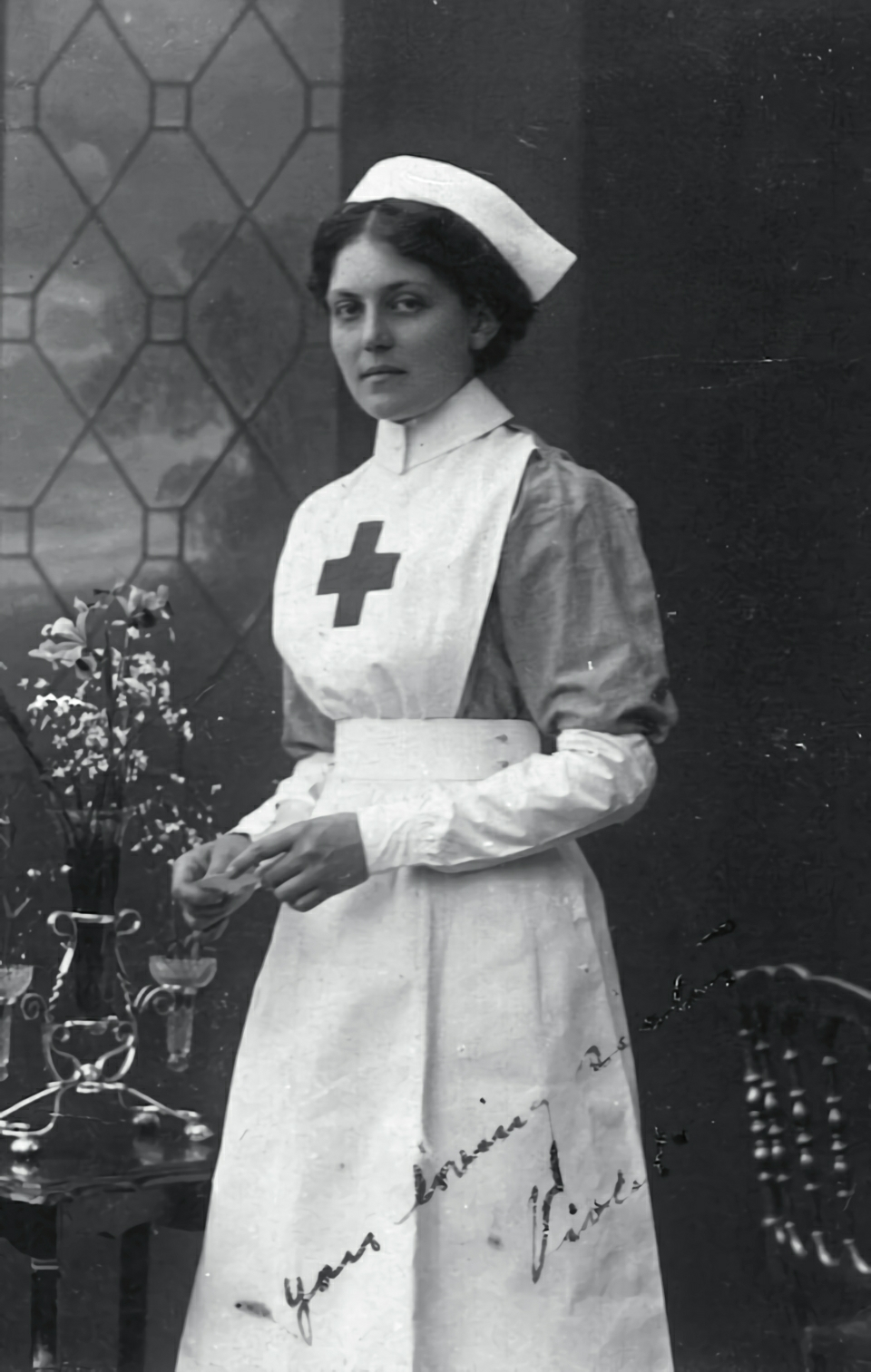
Violet Jessop in her Voluntary Aid Detachment uniform

=== Memoirists ===
Some VADs left written records of their service:

- Lucilla Andrews, novelist whose autobiography No Time for Romance included vivid descriptions of her WWII nursing experiences
- Enid Bagnold, British author of the novel National Velvet, on which the 1944 film with Elizabeth Taylor was based. Her account of her experiences are related in her memoir A Diary Without Dates published in 1918
- Vera Brittain, British author of the best-selling 1933 memoir Testament of Youth, recounting her experiences during World War I
- Mary Cameron (pseudonym?) wrote an autobiography Merrily I Go to Hell (Allen and Unwin, 1932) including extensive experiences as V.A.D.
- Agatha Christie, British author who briefly details her VAD experiences in her posthumously published Autobiography
- Frances Cluett, from Newfoundland, whose letters describe the horrors of World War I
- Lady Ursula d'Abo, English author who details her VAD experiences in her memoir titled The Girl with the Widow's Peak: The Memoirs
- E. M. Delafield, British author of the autobiographical Diary of a Provincial Lady series and some 30 novels; her experiences working at the Exeter VAD Hospital provided her with material for one of her most popular novels, The War Workers, published in 1918
- Mollie Skinner (under the nom de plume R. E. Leake) wrote Letters of a V.A.D. (London: Andrew Melrose, 1918)

=== Medical personnel ===
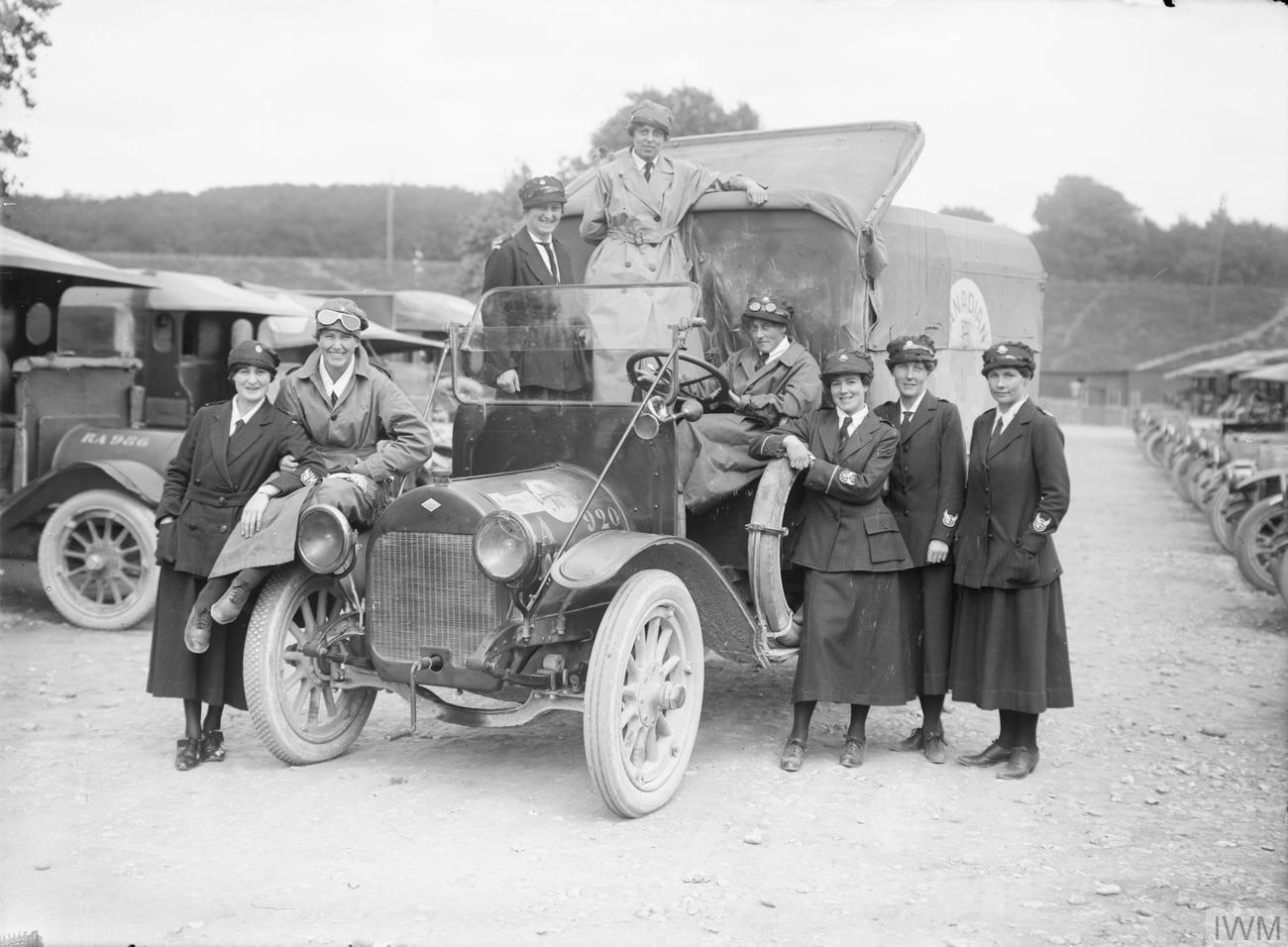
A group of ambulance drivers from the Voluntary Aid Detachment with their vehicle, a Canadian Red Cross ambulance, at Étaples, France, 1917

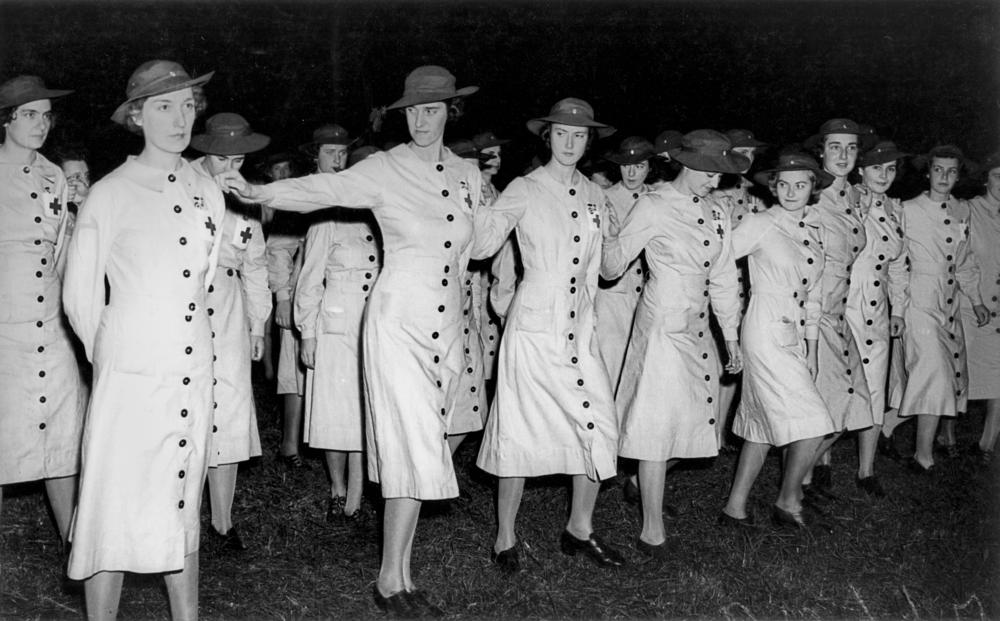
Voluntary Aid Detachment members in Brisbane, Australia, c. 1940

People notable for their contributions to nursing, health, or science, or for their VAD service itself:

- Dame Anne Bryans DBE DStJ, head of the Middle East Command of the Voluntary Aid Detachment during World War II, first director (and later chairman) of the St John and Red Cross Service Hospitals Welfare Department in 1945, vice-chairman of the British Red Cross Executive Committee in 1964
- Edith Cliff OBE, commandant of Gledhow Hall Military Hospital, one of many such directors to be honoured for her nursing work
- Violet Jessop, British ocean liner stewardess trained as a VAD nurse after the outbreak of World War I. She had been a stewardess aboard the RMS Titanic when it sank in 1912 and was also aboard the hospital ship HMHS Britannic (the Titanic's sister ship) as a Red Cross nurse when it sank in 1916
- Aileen Preston, worked for the VAD's Watson Unit, was head of the first autonomous British women’s ambulance unit and was the first woman in history to qualify for the Automobile Association Certificate in Driving
- Marjory Stephenson MBE FRS ARRC, biochemist, bacteriologist and one of the first two women elected to the Royal Society in 1945

=== Other ===
Many VADs were prominent in fields outside their war work:

- Clemence Margaret Acland (1889-1973), English nature photographer, ornithologist and researcher
- Ida Nancy Ashburn, Australian headmistress
- Blanche Badcock, target rifle shooter who was the first woman to compete in the King's Prize
- Mary Borden, Anglo-American novelist
- The Cadiz sisters, Irish suffragettes
- May Wedderburn Cannan, British poet
- Dame Rachel Crowdy, English nurse who was Chief of the Department of Opium Traffic and Social Issues Section of the League of Nations from 1919 to 1931
- Joyce Dennys, English artist
- Lottie Dod, English sportswoman best known as a tennis player. She won the Wimbledon Ladies' Singles Championship five times in the late 19th century
- Amelia Earhart, American aviation pioneer
- Hilda May Gordon, British painter
- A. M. Irvine, author, wrote 28 books, some on a medical themes, mostly stories for girls
- Hattie Jacques, English comedy actress
- Angela Manners, aristocrat and socialite
- Naomi Mitchison, Scottish writer
- Olivia Robertson, British author and co-founder of the Fellowship of Isis
- Sophia Duleep Singh, suffragette
- Venetia Stanley, aristocrat and socialite
- Freya Stark, explorer and travel writer
- Doreen Tovey, British writer on animals, President of RSPCA for North Somerset
- Jessie Traill, Australian painter
- Eleanor Vachell, Welsh botanist
- Anna Zinkeisen, Scottish painter and illustrator
- Doris Zinkeisen, Scottish painter, commercial artist and theatrical designer

== See also ==
- Voluntary Service Detachment, a parallel organisation in Australia

== Sources ==
- A VAD in France, Olive Dent, Diggory Press, ISBN 978-1-905363-09-4
