= Baron Airedale =

Title in the Peerage of the United Kingdom

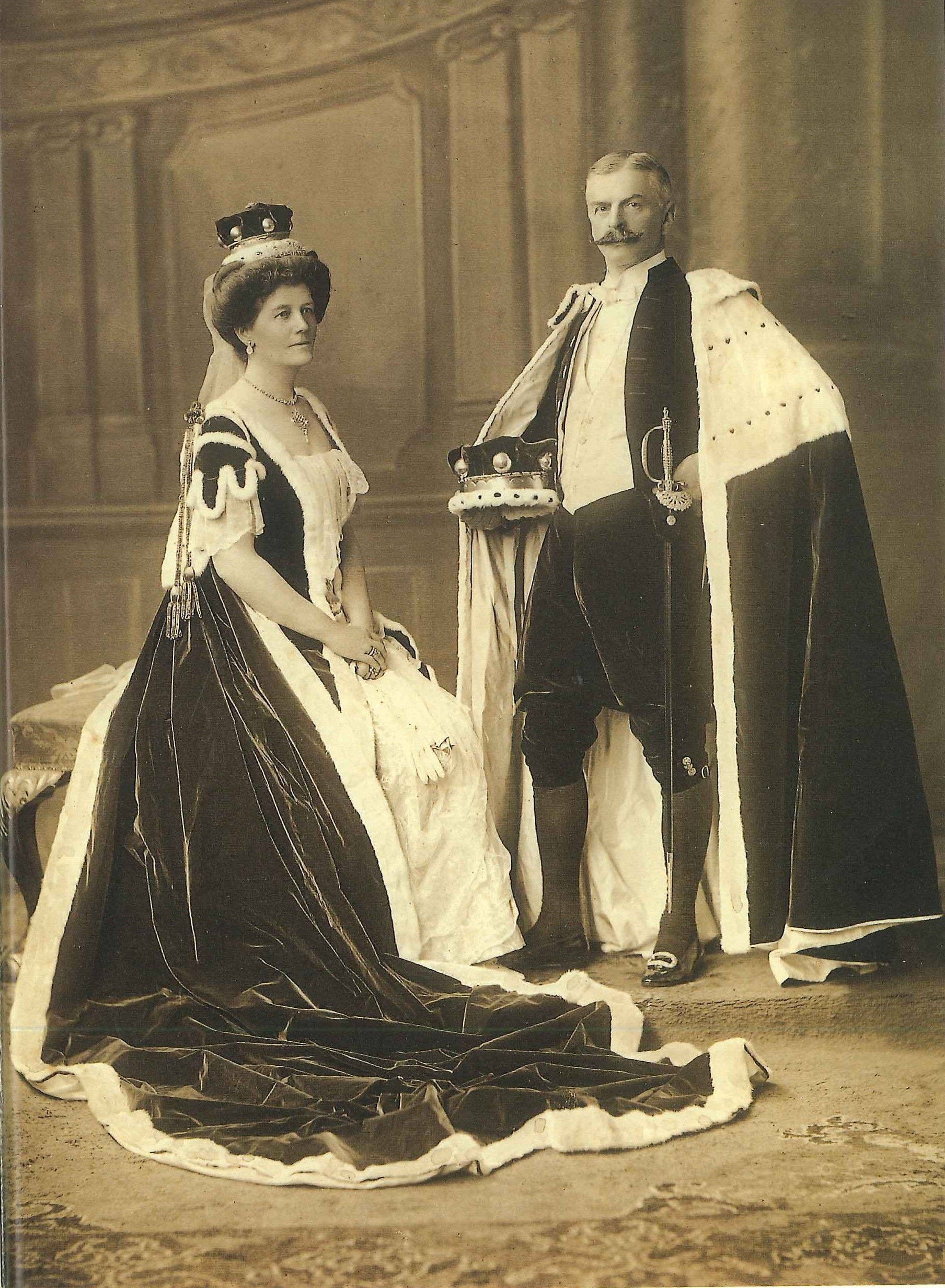
Albert Kitson, 2nd Baron Airedale and his wife, Lady Airedale at the coronation of King George V, 1911

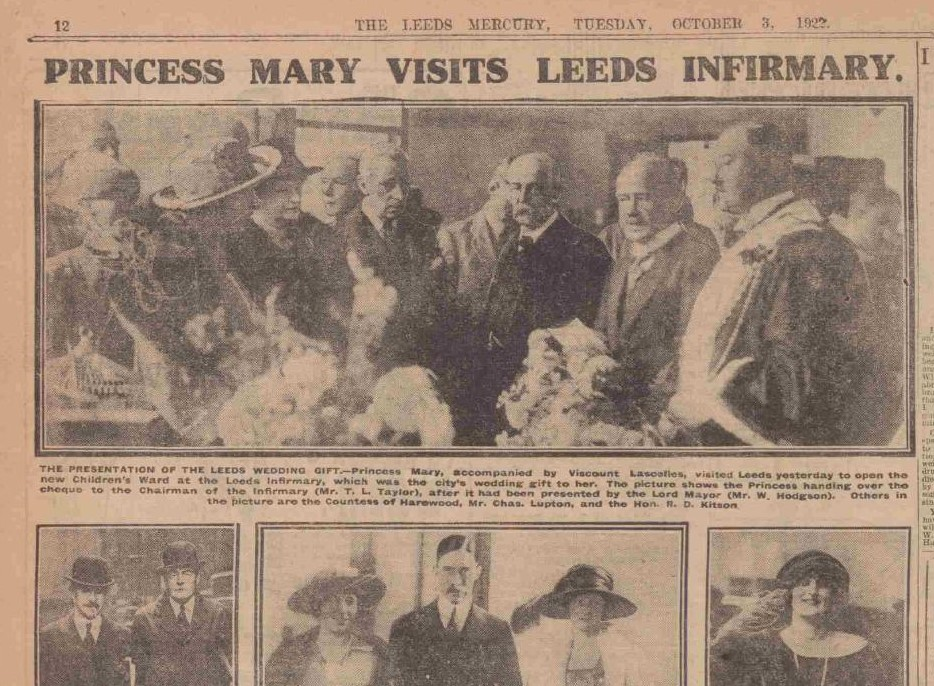
Leeds, 1922 – Roland Kitson, later 3rd Baron Airedale (second from right) with Princess Mary (far left with hat, holding bouquet). Charles Lupton, former Leeds Lord Mayor, is fourth from right

Baron Airedale, of Gledhow in the West Riding of the County of York, was a title in the Peerage of the United Kingdom. It was created on 17 July 1907 for the Liberal politician Sir James Kitson, 1st Baronet, who had previously represented Colne Valley in the House of Commons and served as Lord Mayor of Leeds. Kitson had already been created a Baronet, of Gledhow in the West Riding of the County of York, in the Baronetage of the United Kingdom on 28 August 1886. Variations of the name Kitson included Kittson whose family crest incorporated a demi-unicorn. This unicorn is evident in the Airedale crest atop the arms granted to James Kitson, 1st Baron Airedale in 1907.

Both the title (Barony) and Baronetcy became extinct on the death of his grandson, the 4th Baron, in 1996.

== Barons Airedale (1907) ==
- James Kitson, 1st Baron Airedale (1835–1911)
- Albert Ernest Kitson, 2nd Baron Airedale (1863–1944)
- Roland Dudley Kitson, 3rd Baron Airedale (1882–1958)
- Oliver James Vandeleur Kitson, 4th Baron Airedale (1915–1996), left no heir.

== Arms ==
Coat of arms of Baron Airedale
Crest Issuant from park pales Proper a demi-unicorn Argent gorged with an annulet Azure. Escutcheon Or on a pale Azure a pike haurient of the first a chief of the second thereon an annulet between two millrinds erect of the field. Supporters On either side an owl close and affronteé Argent gorged with a collar Gules pendent therefrom an escutcheon of the arms. Motto Palmam Qui Meruit Ferat

Baronetage of the United Kingdom
Preceded by Mappin baronets	Kitson baronets of Gledhow; 28 August 1886	Succeeded by Jones-Parry baronets
