= Ufford Hall, Cambridgeshire =

Ufford Hall
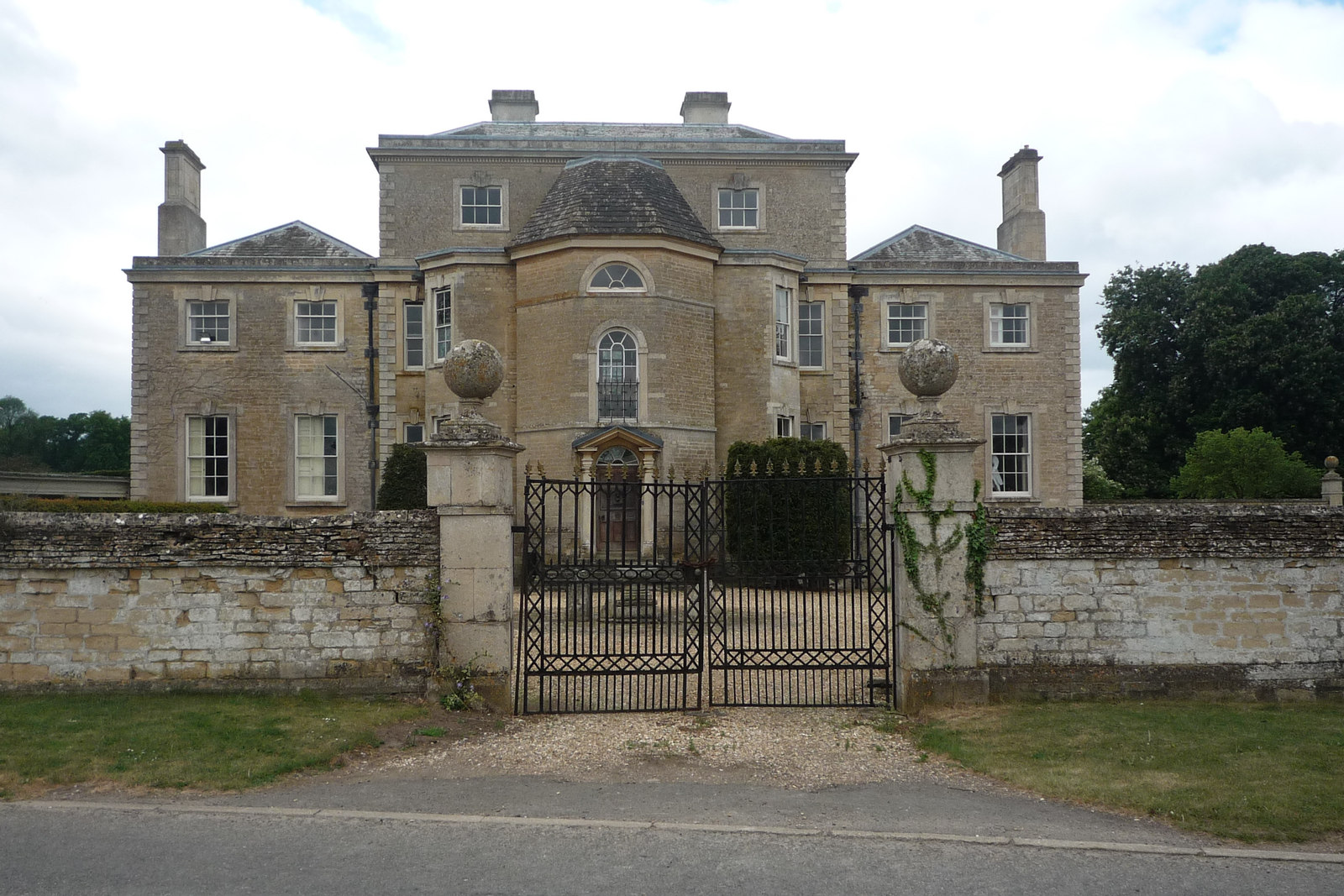

- Location within Cambridgeshire
- 52°37′32.880″N 0°23′11.875″W
- Location: Ufford, Cambridgeshire
- OS grid reference: TF0930404339

History
- Built: 1734
- Built for: Lord Charles Manners

Site notes
- Restored: 2015-2017

Listed Building – Grade I

Ufford Hall is a Georgian country house in the village of Ufford, now in the Peterborough unitary authority area of the ceremonial county of Cambridgeshire, England. Ufford was part of the Soke of Peterborough, which was associated with Northamptonshire but had its own county council from 1888 until 1965, and then formed part of Huntingdon and Peterborough until 1974. The nearest town is Stamford, Lincolnshire.

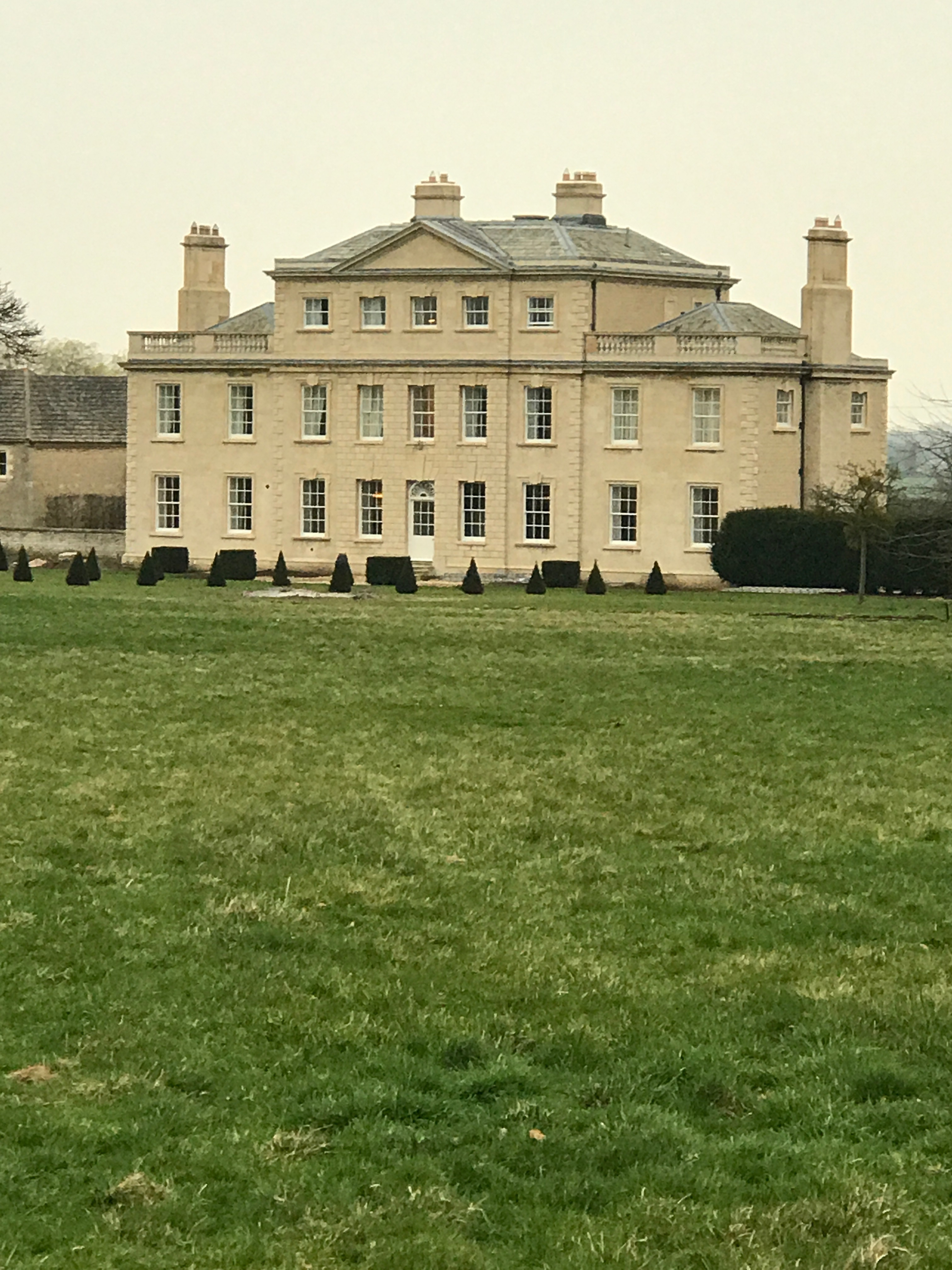
The rear of Ufford Hall following its restoration

The Hall is a Grade I listed building. The house is built of ashlar, the central five bays of three storeys with two-bay flanking wings on both sides, each of two storeys. At the front is a central pedimented porch with Tuscan columns. The Hall stands in a gravelled courtyard with the entrance façade facing the village street and with parkland to the rear.

== History ==
The Hall was built in 1734 for Lord Charles Manners, a younger son of the Duke of Rutland and Lucy Manners, Duchess of Rutland, on land he had bought from his mother. On his death it passed to his brother James who enlarged the original house by adding an extra floor and the flanking wings and also built a stable block. James left the house to his nephew, George Manners, who sold it by auction.

It was bought by William Leigh Symes, owner of the Oxford estate, a sugar plantation in Jamaica, and, in 1797, inherited by his son, Robert. The latter never occupied the hall and it was leased to a succession of tenants for the next 100 years or so. Among the residents was Tory MP Henry Swann (1763 – 1824). In 1902 it was bought by Malcolm Wolryche–Whitmore who, on his death in 1940, left it to his nephew, Oliver Kitson, from 1958 Lord Airedale. His father, Roland Kitson, 3rd Baron Airedale, lived there until his death in 1958. The fourth Lord Airedale lived in the basement and converted the rest of the house into apartments. The stable block became a self-contained dwelling known as Fountain Court.

Upon the death of Lord Airedale in 1996, the Hall passed to the National Trust who sold it on due to its poor physical condition. In 2015 a major restoration project was begun by the new owners; the renovations were completed in 2017.
