= Hilda May Gordon =

British painter (1874-1972)

- Born: 20 September 1874; Isle of Wight, England
- Died: 21 November 1972 (aged 98); Chelsea, London
- Education: The Herkomer School
- Known for: Painting

Hilda May Gordon (20 September 1874 – 21 November 1972) was a widely travelled British artist, known for her watercolour paintings of landscapes and figures.

== Biography ==
Gordon grew up on the Isle of Wight to Scottish parents who had previously lived in South Africa. Gordon studied under Hubert von Herkomer at his art school in Bushey and was also taught by Frank Brangwyn. During 1900 she accomplished Brangwyn on a sketching trip to France. In 1907 she had a solo show at a Bond Street gallery. During World War I she served as a Voluntary Aid Detachment nurse in Europe and the Middle East, eventually returning to Britain in 1921. In 1922 she embarked on an independent round-the-world trip which eventually took six years to complete and involved visiting 22 different countries, including a number of the Balkan countries, Greece, India, China, Korea and Japan. She endured numerous dangers and stayed in both local huts and palaces, witnessed a volcano exploding in Bali and a royal funeral pyre in Siam. Gordon painted throughout the trip and her final stop before returning to England was in New York during March 1928, where she exhibited watercolours from her travels. A similar exhibition was held at the Fine Art Society gallery in London when she returned to England. Gordon became a Fellow of the Royal Geographical Society in 1928. She continued to paint and travel and in due course settled at Chelsea in London, where she died in 1972. The Martyn Gregory Gallery held a retrospective in Britain in 1987 and a further, short, exhibition of her work in New York in 2018.
