= Roland Kitson, 3rd Baron Airedale =

British businessman (1882-1958)

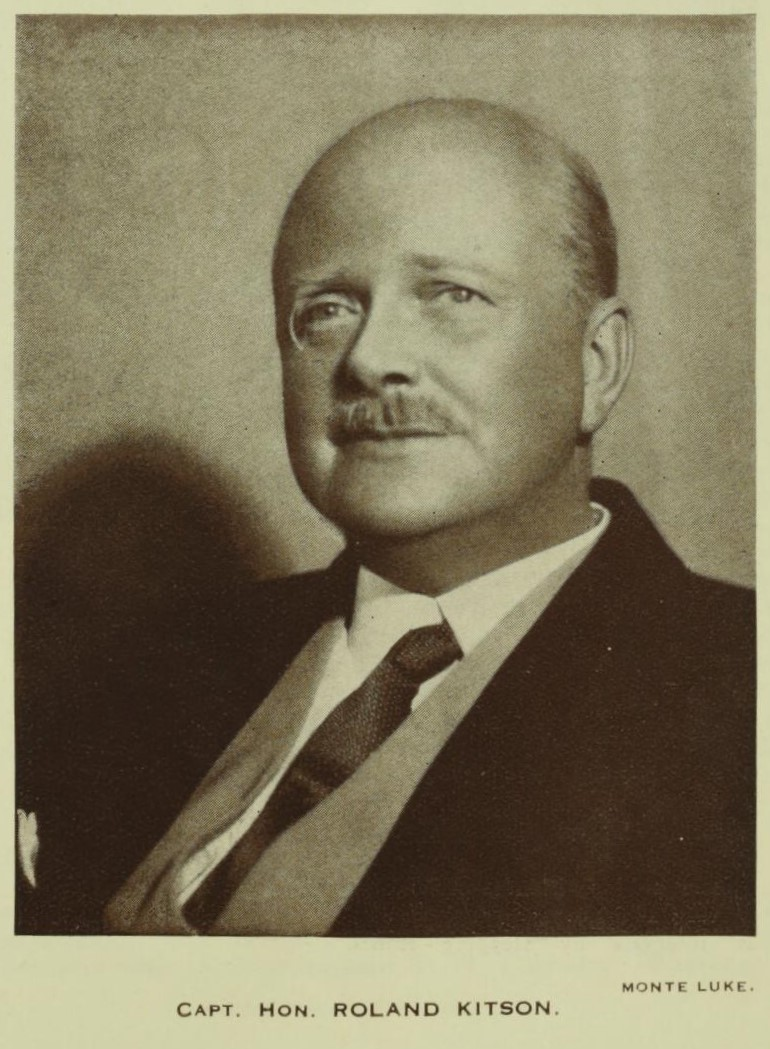
Portrait of Kitson taken in 1932 during his visit to Sydney, Australia.

Captain Roland Dudley Kitson, 3rd Baron Airedale DSO, MC (19 July 1882 – 20 March 1958), businessman, was born in Leeds, son of Sir James Kitson, 1st Baron Airedale and his second wife, Mary Laura, daughter of Edward Fisher Smith. Roland's elder half-brother was Albert Kitson, 2nd Baron Airedale.

== Career ==
Born in Leeds, Kitson's family had a long association with Yorkshire. His father and grandfather both served as Lord Mayor of Leeds. His father was MP for Colne Valley 1892–1907. Kitson was educated at Westminster and Trinity College, Cambridge.

As "the Hon. R. D. Kitson", he is recorded in April 1913 as working as a Leeds magistrate alongside Alderman Francis Martineau Lupton, whose first cousin (once removed) was Florence, Baroness Airedale, Kitson's sister-in-law.

He served in the 1914–1918 war with the West Yorkshire Regiment, being appointed a Companion of the Distinguished Service Order (DSO) and the Military Cross (MC).

His grandfather James had founded Airedale Foundry in Hunslet in 1835. Under Roland's father, also James Kitson and uncle, Frederick Kitson, and known as Kitsons of Leeds, this business became the manufacturer of about 5,400 locomotives in its first century.

He worked for a time in the Airedale Foundry and in the Monk Bridge Iron and Steel Company works.

His directorships included:

- director and deputy chairman of Dorman Long.
- director of the Bank of England 1923–1947
- director of Ford Motor Company Limited from its incorporation in 1928,
  he succeeded Lord Perry as chairman in 1948, until 1954
- director of North-Eastern Railway before its amalgamation
- director of London Assurance Corporation
- director of John Dickinson and Company Limited

He succeeded to the titles of 3rd Baron Airedale, of Gledhow, and 3rd Baronet on the death of his elder half-brother, 11 March 1944.

He was living in the 1940s until his death in 1958 at Ufford Hall, Cambridgeshire.

== Family ==
He married Sheila Grace, daughter of F E Vandeleur in 1913. They had a daughter and a son:

- Oliver James Vandeleur Kitson (1915–1996); Oliver assumed the additional name of Vandeleur by deed poll in 1935.

After the death of his first wife in 1935 he married Dorothy Christabel Rowland Pelly, widow of Capt H M Rowland, on 16 September 1937.

He died in London, aged 75.

== Arms ==
Coat of arms of Roland Kitson, 3rd Baron Airedale
Crest Issuant from park pales Proper a demi-unicorn Argent gorged with an annulet Azure. Escutcheon Or on a pale Azure a pike haurient of the first a chief of the second thereon an annulet between two millrinds erect of the field. Supporters On either side an owl close and affronteé Argent gorged with a collar Gules pendent therefrom an escutcheon of the arms. Motto Palmam Qui Meruit Ferat

Honorary titles
Preceded by Sir William Plender, Bt	High Sheriff of the County of London; 1928–1929	Succeeded by Albert Gladstone
Peerage of the United Kingdom
Preceded by Albert Kitson	Baron Airedale; 1958–1996	Succeeded by Oliver Kitson
