= Ufford, Cambridgeshire =

Village in Cambridgeshire, England

Coordinates: 52.624°N 0.385°W

Ufford
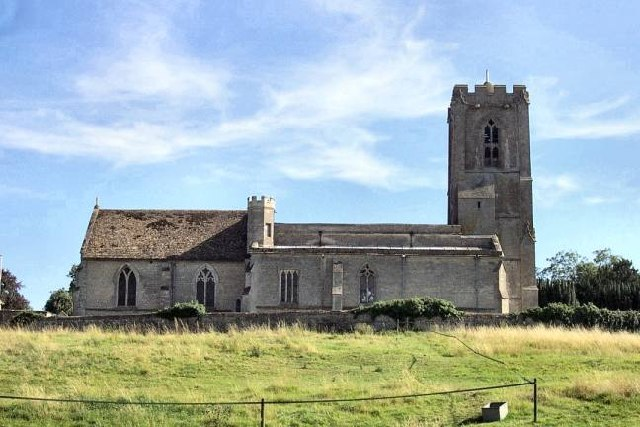
- St Andrew's Church, Ufford

- Location within Cambridgeshire
- Unitary authority: Peterborough
- Ceremonial county: Cambridgeshire
- Region: East
- Country: England
- Sovereign state: United Kingdom
- Post town: STAMFORD
- Postcode district: PE9

Ufford is a village and civil parish, now in the Peterborough unitary authority of the ceremonial county of Cambridgeshire, England. It was historically part of the Soke of Peterborough, which was associated with Northamptonshire but had its own county council from 1888 until 1974. For electoral purposes it forms part of Barnack ward and is in the North West Cambridgeshire constituency.

St Andrew's Church is a Grade I listed medieval building that is closed and has passed into the care of the Churches Conservation Trust. Most of the church dates from the 14th century. It consists of a nave without a clerestory, aisles, and a chancel. There is also a west tower, and a rood turret near the junction of the nave and chancel, both of which are embattled. The church contains a series of 20th-century Arts and Crafts stained glass by Mary Lowndes.

Ufford Hall is also a Grade I listed building. The hall was built in 1734 for Lord Charles Manners, a younger son of the Duke of Rutland. Until his death in 1996 it was lived in by Oliver Kitson, 4th Baron Airedale.

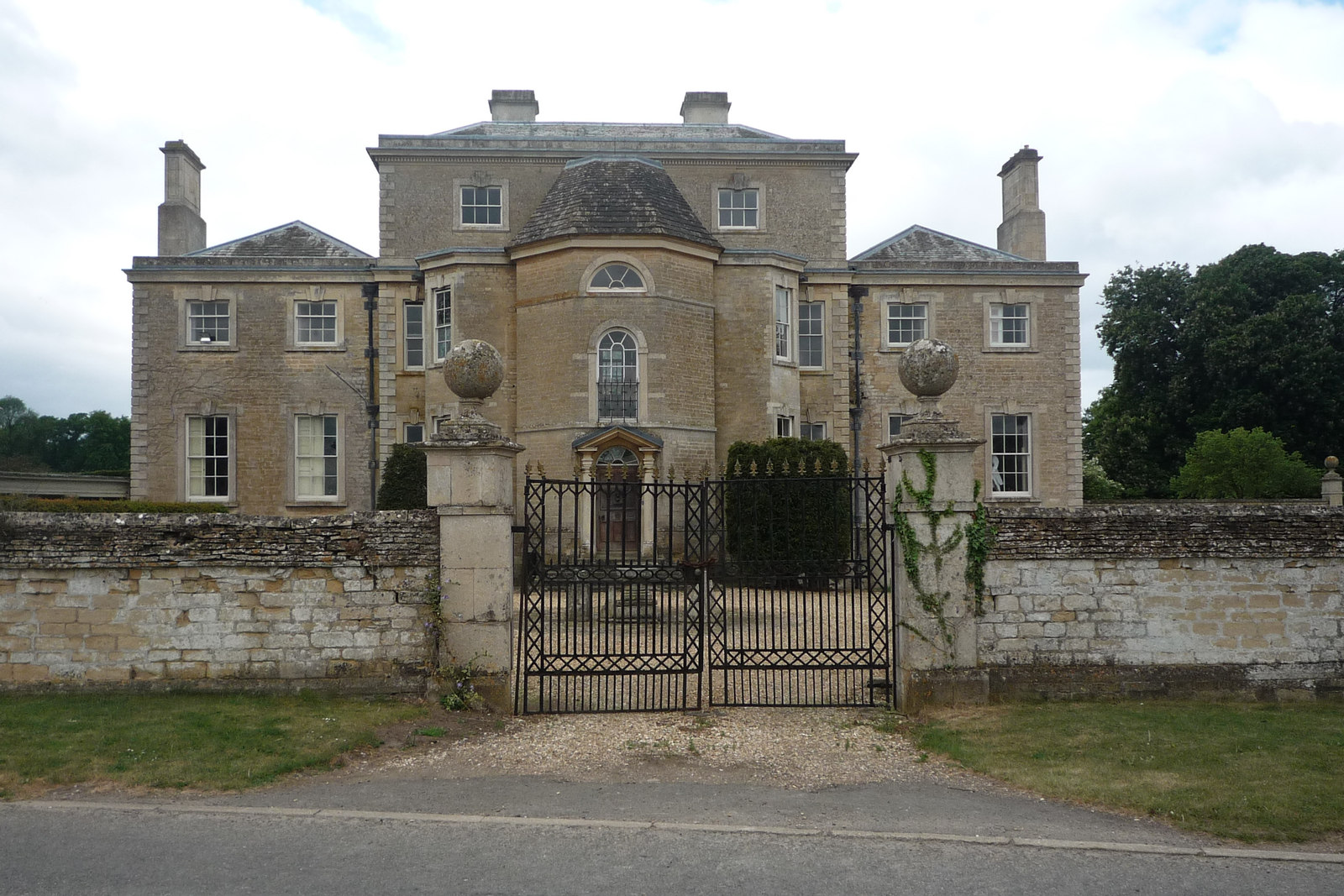
Ufford Hall

== See also ==
- Ufford Bridge railway station
