= Blanche Badcock =

British rifle shooter (1892–1957)

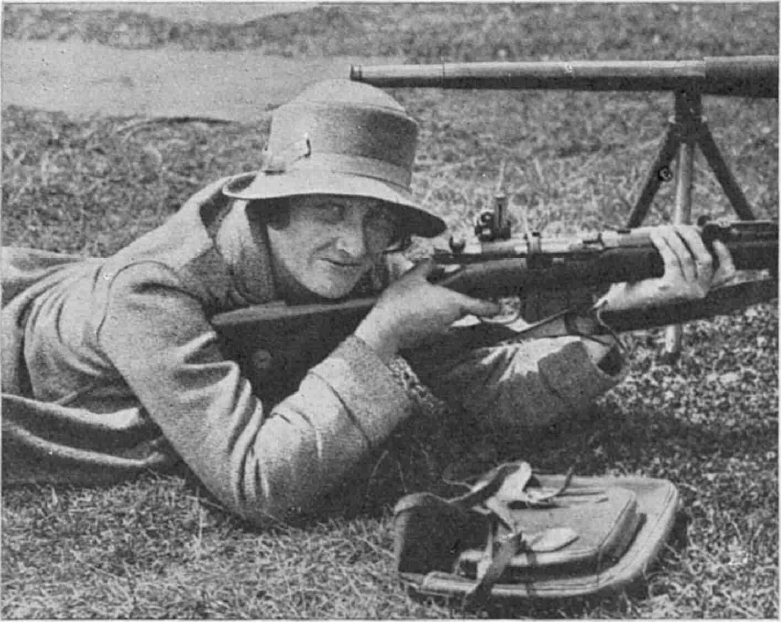
- Shooting for the King's Prize in 1926

Personal information
- National team: India
- Citizenship: British
- Born: Blanche Margaret Mary Badcock; 1892 British India
- Died: 20 January 1957 (aged 64–65)
- Occupation: Poultry farmer
- Life partner: Marjorie Foster

Sport
- Sport: Fullbore target rifle
- Military career
- Allegiance: United Kingdom
- Service: British Army; Royal Air Force
- Rank: Flight officer
- Units: Army Service Corps; Women's Auxiliary Air Force
- Wars: First World War; Second World War

Blanche Margaret Mary Badcock (1892 – 20 January 1957) was a British rifle shooter. She was the first woman to compete in the Sovereign's Prize and the first to be selected for the Kolapore Match, respectively the most prestigious individual and team competitions in British target rifle shooting. She was the life partner of Marjorie Foster, the first woman to win the Sovereign's Prize.

Born in British India in 1892, Badcock was the daughter of an English civil servant, and spent her early life in Kent and in Cheltenham. She became a Voluntary Aid Detachment nurse and an Army Service Corps driver during the First World War, where she met Marjorie Foster. After the war, Foster and Badcock moved to a poultry farm near Bisley Camp in Surrey, the centre of British target rifle shooting, where Foster encouraged Badcock to take up the sport. In 1926, Badcock became the first woman to compete in the Sovereign's Prize, and she reached the final of the event in 1932. As a team shooter, she represented Hampshire and India: she was selected as a reserve for the latter in the 1938 Kolapore Match.

During the Second World War, Badcock served as an officer in the Women's Auxiliary Air Force, and was made an Additional Member of the Order of the British Empire. She lived with Foster on her farm for the rest of her life, and died on 20 January 1957.

== Life ==
Blanche Margaret Mary Badcock was born in British India in 1892. She was the daughter of Francis Badcock, a native of Taunton in Somerset serving in India with the Indian Civil Service, and his second wife, Adele Margaret. In 1895, Francis Badcock returned to England, moving first to Detling in Kent, where Badcock was educated by a governess. By 1911, the family were living at College Green in Cheltenham, by which point Badcock's education appears to have concluded.

In December 1914, following the outbreak of the First World War, Badcock became a Voluntary Aid Detachment nurse at Suffolk Hall Hospital in Cheltenham, holding the position until January 1917. She also served as a driver in the Army Service Corps. During the war, she met her life partner, Marjorie Foster, a driver in the Women's Legion of Motor Drivers. After the war, they ran a poultry farm and home together at Coleford Paddocks in the village of Frimley Green, near Bisley Camp in Surrey, the centre of British target rifle shooting.

In October 1925, Foster persuaded Badcock to take up rifle shooting, and they both joined the South London Rifle Club, the only Bisley club which accepted women. In 1926, Badcock became the first woman to compete in the King's Prize, the most prestigious competition in British target rifle shooting, which at the time was restricted to competitors who had served in the British military. She reached the second of the three stages of the event, missing qualification for the final hundred by a single point out of 150. She made the final of the King's in 1932. In the same year, along with Foster, she shot for Hampshire in the County Championship Short Range: both scored 141, the highest of the team. In 1938, she was selected as a reserve for India in the Kolapore Match, the premier competition in Commonwealth team shooting, becoming the first woman to be a member of a Kolapore team. (Note: Cornfield 1987, p. 120. For Badcock's reserve status, see Reader 2021, p. 27.) She shot in the Mackinnon long-range international match in 1936, 1938, 1939 and 1946, in the latter year representing India.

The owner of Coleford Paddocks, Reginald Cory, bequeathed the farm to Badcock upon his death in 1934; the administrative transfer of it into her ownership was probably completed by 1938. During the Second World War, Badcock served in the Women's Auxiliary Air Force: she was made a company assistant, the lowest officer rank, with effect from 24 October 1939, and later became a flight officer. In 1940, she was made an Additional Member of the Order of the British Empire; her address was given in the London Gazette as the India Rifle Club in London. She continued to run her poultry farm, along with Foster, for the remainder of her life. She died on 20 January 1957, leaving an estate valued at £7,302 10s 6d (equivalent to £152,951 in 2025) to her widowed sister, Estelle.

== Works cited ==
- "19 'Amazons' to Shoot at Bisley". Evening Standard. 18 June 1928. p. 19 – via Newspapers.com.
- Cornfield, Susie (1987). The Queen's Prize: The Story of the National Rifle Association. London: Pelham. ISBN 0-7207-1751-5.
- Kay, Joyce (23 September 2004). "Foster, Marjorie Elaine (1893–1974), Rifle Shot and Poultry Farmer". Oxford Dictionary of National Biography. Vol. 1 (online ed.). Oxford University Press. doi:10.1093/ref:odnb/65174. ISBN 9780198614128. (Subscription, Wikipedia Library access or UK public library membership required.)
- Masterson, Margery (September 2023). "Shots Fired". History Today. pp. 78–85.
- Reader, Jean (2021). "Reginald Cory, Blanche Badcock and a Poultry Farm in Surrey" (PDF). Welsh Historical Gardens Trust Bulletin. 80: 25–27.
- Sayer, Karen (2013). "'His Feet upon Her Shoulders': The Place of Women Within Poultry Keeping in the British Countryside, c. 1880 to c. 1980" (PDF). Agricultural History Review. 61 (2): 301–329.
- Tames, Richard (2005). Sporting London: A Race Through Time. London: Historical Publications. ISBN 978-1-905286-06-5.
- Williams, Jean (2014). A Contemporary History of Women's Sport, Part 1: Sporting Women 1850–1960. Routledge Research in Sports History. New York: Routledge. ISBN 978-0-415-88601-7.
- "Woman Wins the King's Prize at Bisley". The Brisbane Courier. 21 July 1930. p. 11.
- "Women in Sport". The Illustrated Sporting and Dramatic News. 24 July 1926. pp. 248, 250.
