= Kittson =

Kittson may refer to:

- Kittson County, Minnesota, United States
- USS Kittson (APA-123), a Haskell-class attack transport
- Kittson (processor), the codename for the Itanium 9700 processor series by Intel

== People with the surname ==
- Jean Kittson (born 1955), Australian multi-talented performer and writer
- Norman Kittson (1814-1888), American fur trader, steamboat-line operator, and railway entrepreneur

== See also ==
- Kitson (disambiguation)
