= Marjorie Foster =

British rifle shooter (1893–1974)

Marjorie Foster MBE
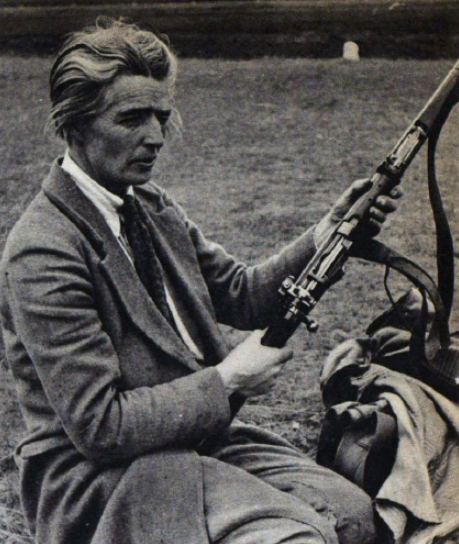
- Photographed during the 1939 King's Prize

Personal information
- Full name: Marjorie Elaine Foster
- Born: June 20, 1893 Hampstead
- Died: March 30, 1974 (aged 80) Woking
- Occupation: Poultry farmer
- Life partner: Blanche Badcock (died 1957)

Sport
- Sport: Fullbore target rifle

Marjorie Elaine Foster MBE (20 June 1893 – 30 March 1974) was a British rifle shot and poultry farmer. In 1930 she became the first woman to win the prestigious King's Prize for shooting.

== Life ==
Foster was born in Hampstead in 1893 and when she was eight her father encouraged her to join a shooting club. Her father, Lancelot Henry William Foster, made syphons and her mother was Mary Aldridge (born Leetham). She later recalled that her parents had encouraged her to give up shooting at the age of fourteen, so as to concentrate on her school-work.

When the First World War started Foster was working as a sculptor. She joined the Women's Legion of Motor Drivers, where she acted as a driving instructor and ambulance driver. She met Blanche Badcock, a driver in the Army Service Corps, and after the war they set up a poultry farm and home together. Around 1925, she visited Bisley, where she met George Fulton, the winner of the 1888 Queen's Prize who owned an armourer's shop on the site. Fulton encouraged her to return to shooting and lent her a rifle.

Foster was one of the first women to rank competitively in mixed-gender shooting events. In October 1925, she persuaded Badcock to take up the sport, and they both joined the South London Rifle Club at Bisley, the only one which accepted women. Foster won the club championship four times. The most prestigious competition for shooting was the King's Prize which was an annual event that had been won every year since 1860 by a man who was or had been a member of the armed forces. Blanche Badcock had been the first woman to compete in it in 1926; Foster made her first entry in 1929. In 1929, Foster became the first person to shoot a perfect score on the newly resized Bisley targets, which had smaller bullseyes than those previously used.

On 19 July 1930, Foster became the first woman to win the Sovereign's Prize. In total, 861 men and four women entered that year's competition; Foster became the first woman to qualify for the competition's third and final stage, The final was contested between the top hundred competitors: Foster had placed fourth in the second stage and joint first, tied with six male shooters, in the first. In the final, she scored 280 points, ahead of Lieutenant Eccles of the Seaforth Highlanders, who scored 279: she won the competition on the final shot, scoring a bullseye (worth five points) to Eccles' outer, worth two. During the same Imperial Meeting, she placed second in the St George's Vase competition, losing by a single point.

For her King's victory, Foster received £250 (equivalent to £19,964 in 2023) in prize money, a gold medal and a personal telegram from the King. In keeping with tradition she was "chaired" off the range in a sedan chair carried by the spectators, while the scene was filmed by Pathé News. She was returned to Frimley on their fire engine and she toured the town. The people of Frimley gave her a car paid for by public subscription.

The public reaction to Foster's victory was highly enthusiastic. The Daily Telegraph called Foster's win "an epoch-making event", while Equal Rights, the magazine of the US National Woman's Party, declared that it had "asserted woman's superiority over the best marksmen of the Empire". She also received a telegram of congratulations from George V, calling her success "a wonderful achievement in the history of rifle shooting [which] will be universally acclaimed". Her victory received substantially greater press coverage than that of previous male winners, which the sporting historians Mike Huggins and Jack Williams attribute to the rarity at the time of women as winners in male-dominated sports such as shooting.

During the Second World War, Foster served as a driver, shooting instructor, and nurse, and was made an MBE for her service. From the summer of 1940, she was among several women who campaigned unsuccessfully for women to be allowed to join the Local Defence Volunteers and Home Guard. In response to their rejection from the LDV, she became a founding member of the Amazons, a women's organisation which campaigned against the decision and trained women in shooting and military skills.

Foster was capped a single time for Great Britain, shooting in the 1949 Kolapore international match;

Foster was a lifelong teetotaller, though she announced that she would permit herself a glass of champagne to celebrate her King's victory. She was known for her shooting attire, a characteristically masculine outfit of a tweed coat, breeches, short hair and a beret. Badcock died in 1957; Foster left her farm and moved into a bungalow on the grounds of Bisley Camp. Her health deteriorated, probably due to Alzheimer's disease, by 1970, and she died in Brookwood Hospital near Woking on 30 March 1974. Her status as the only woman to win the Sovereign's Prize lasted until 2000, when it was won by Joanna Hossack.

== Works cited ==
- Bull, Stephen (2016). Churchill's Army 1939–1945: The Men, Machines and Organisation. London: Bloomsbury. ISBN 9781844863990.
- Cornfield, Susie (1987). The Queen's Prize: The Story of the National Rifle Association. London: Pelham. ISBN 0720717515.
- Crawford, Scott (2001). "Shooting". In Christensen, Karen; Guttmann, Allen; Pfister, Gertrud (eds.). International Encyclopaedia of Women and Sports. Vol. 3. New York: Macmillan Reference USA. ISBN 0028649532.
- "First woman to win Bisley in 70 years". The Independent. 24 July 2000.
- Huggins, Mike; Williams, Jack (2006). Sport and the English, 1918–1939. Abingdon: Routledge. ISBN 9780415331852.
- Kay, Joyce (23 September 2004). "Foster, Marjorie Elaine (1893–1974), rifle shot and poultry farmer". Oxford Dictionary of National Biography. Vol. 1 (online ed.). Oxford University Press. doi:10.1093/ref:odnb/65174. ISBN 978-0-19-861412-8. (Subscription, Wikipedia Library access or UK public library membership required.)
- Lampe, David (2013). The Last Ditch: Britain's Secret Resistance and the Nazi Invasion Plan. Huddersfield: Pen & Sword Books. ISBN 9781473877641 – via Google Books.
- Lyons, Imogen (6 January 2016). "Marjorie Foster: Prize-Winning Rifle Shot and Poultry Farmer". Intriguing People. Archived from the original on 26 March 2016.
- Masterson, Margery (September 2023). "Shots Fired". History Today. pp. 78–85.
- Williams, Jean (2014). A Contemporary History of Women's Sport, Part 1: Sporting Women 1850–1960. Routledge Research in Sports History. New York: Routledge. ISBN 9780415886017.
- "Woman Wins the King's Prize at Bisley". The Brisbane Courier. 21 July 1930. p. 11.
- "Women Hold King's Prizes". Equal Rights. Vol. 16. 1930. p. 207 – via Google Books.
- "Women in Sport". The Illustrated Sporting and Dramatic News. 24 July 1926. pp. 248, 250.
