= James Kitson, 1st Baron Airedale =

British peer and politician

Sir James Kitson c. 1895

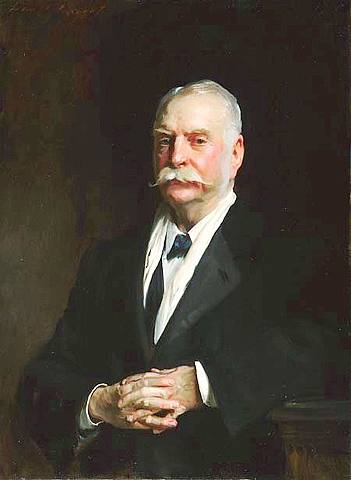
Lord Airedale, oil on canvas, John Singer Sargent, 1905

James Kitson, 1st Baron Airedale (22 September 1835 – 16 March 1911), PC, DSc, was an industrialist, locomotive builder, Liberal Party politician and a Member of Parliament for the Holme Valley. He was known as Sir James Kitson from 1886, until he was elevated to the peerage in 1907. Lord Airedale was a prominent Unitarian in Leeds, Yorkshire.

== Life ==
James Kitson's parents were James Kitson (1807–1885) a self-made locomotive manufacturer who founded Kitson and Company, and his first wife Ann Newton. They had four sons, James being the second. Their daughter Emily, married the royal obstetrician William Smoult Playfair in 1864, and became incidentally involved in a court case with implications for medical ethics that resonate today. Another son was Arthur Octavius Kitson, whose wife was the subject of that court case.

Kitson attended the Wakefield Proprietary School, and studied chemistry and natural sciences at University College London.

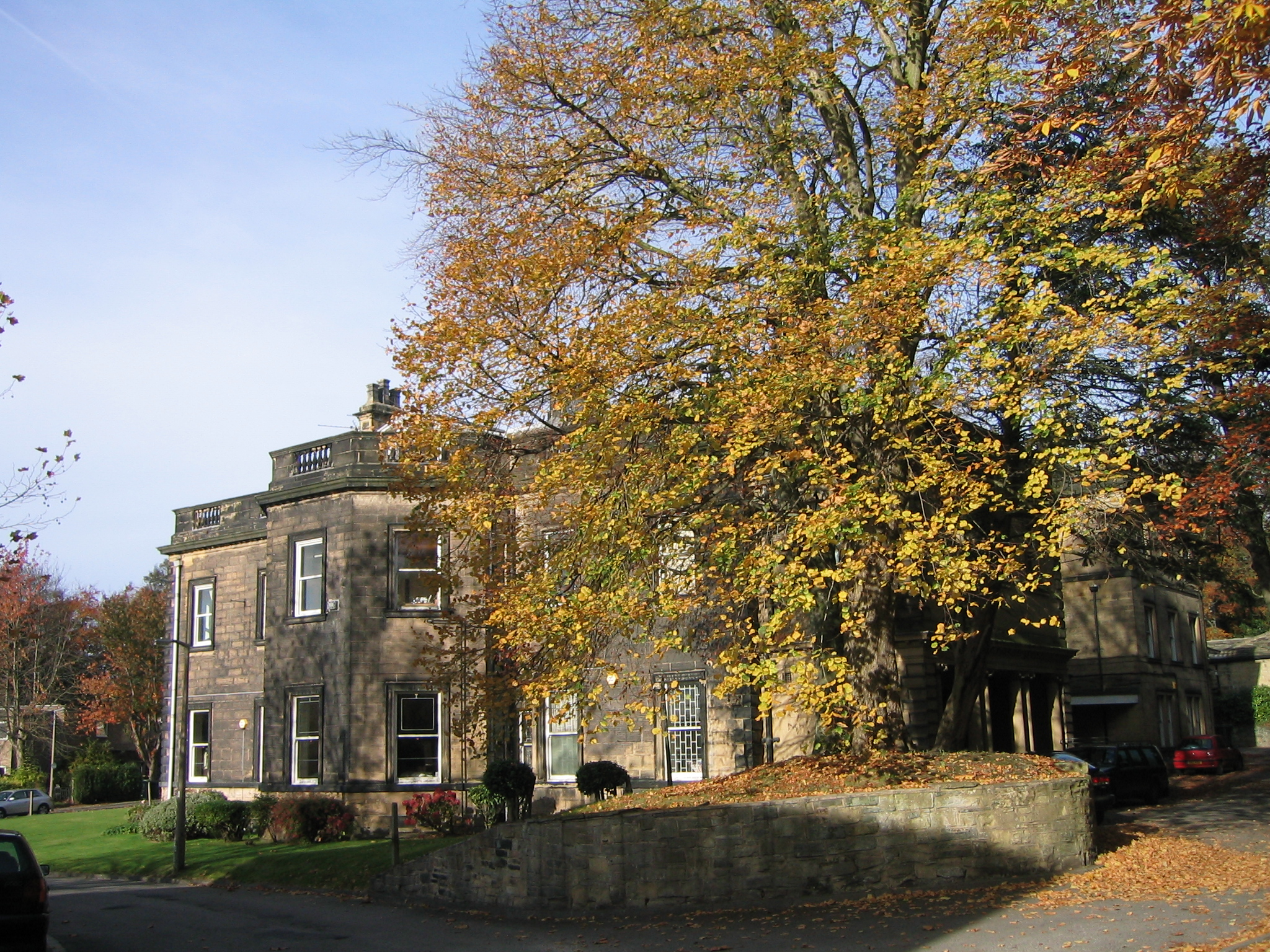
Gledhow Hall

In 1885 Kitson purchased Gledhow Hall in Gledhow, Leeds. He redecorated the hall and entertained lavishly including playing host to Prime Minister William Gladstone and his son, Herbert, who was a witness at Kitson's second marriage to Mary Laura Smith in 1881. He commissioned Burmantofts Pottery to create an elaborate bathroom with faience for a visit from the Prince of Wales c. 1885.

== Career ==
In 1854, when Kitson was aged nineteen, his father bought the ironworks at Monk Bridge and put him and his elder brother, Frederick, in charge. Monkbridge was amalgamated with their father's Airedale Foundry in 1858. In 1886 the business was a limited liability company under family control with £250,000 in capital. Frederick Kitson withdrew from the business because of ill health several years before his death in 1877. Their father retired in 1876 but James Kitson in reality ran the firm from 1862. The Airedale Foundry built nearly 6,000 locomotives for use in Britain and abroad from when it was founded until the end of the 19th century. The company diversified into manufacturing stationary engines for agricultural use and steam engines for tramways. From the 1880s, the Monkbridge works made steel using the Siemens–Martin open-hearth process. The Airedale Foundry and Monkbridge Works both employed about 2000 workers in 1911.

In connection with his business interests Kitson was a member of the Institution of Mechanical Engineers from 1859 and was president of the Iron Trade Association. He was president of the Iron and Steel Institute in 1889 and was awarded the institute's Bessemer gold medal in 1903. Between 1899 and 1901, he was a member of the council of the Institution of Civil Engineers.

Kitson's other interests included the London and Northern Steamship Company and the Yorkshire Banking Company. He was a director of the London City and Midland Bank and president of the Baku Russian Petroleum Company. He was also a director of the North Eastern Railway Company and president of the Leeds Chamber of Commerce from 1880 to 1881.

Financial success allowed Kitson time, money and influence to pursue other interests including politics. He was president of the Leeds Liberal Association and ran the election campaign for William Ewart Gladstone. In 1880, Kitson was a committee member of the Leeds Trained Nurses Institution. He was elected MP for Colne Valley from 1892 until 1907, supporting education, Irish Home Rule, and the provision of old age pensions.

Kitson was a member of the Institution of Civil Engineers and the Institution of Mechanical Engineers. He supported the Mechanics' Institute and the Yorkshire College, the forerunner of the University of Leeds, which awarded him an honorary doctorate, DSc in 1904. Kitson was never a member of Leeds Council but was the city's first lord mayor in 1896–7. He was created a baronet in 1886 and was sworn of the Privy Council in 1906. On 17 July 1907 Kitson was raised to the peerage as the first Baron Airedale of Gledhow in the West Riding of the County of York.

Kitson was appointed Honorary Colonel of the 3rd (Volunteer) Battalion, The Prince of Wales's Own (West Yorkshire Regiment) on 20 December 1902.

He was President of Manchester College, Oxford (now named Harris Manchester College) from 1909 to 1911.

== Death ==
Airedale died following a heart attack in Paris at the Hotel Meurice on 16 March 1911. He had been returning home by train from the south of France. His funeral service was held at Mill Hill Chapel on 22 March before his body was taken for burial to Roundhay Church along a route lined by 4000 workpeople. A subsequent memorial service at St Margaret's Church in Westminster was attended by a hundred MPs.

== Mill Hill Chapel ==
The Kitsons were closely linked to Mill Hill Chapel in Leeds City Square. In 1897 Kitson paid for an extension to the vestry. William Morris designed a window which was dedicated to his mother Ann Kitson who died in 1865. Archibald Keightley Nicholson created a memorial window to Lord Airedale representing the continuation of Christianity. In the early-20th century Lord Airedale was a member of the chapel's small, politically active and very influential congregation. Kitson contributed to a Parliamentary inquiry into the Religious Education for Dissenting Protestants in 1899.

== Family ==
Kitson married Emily Christina Cliff (1837–1873), daughter of Joseph Cliff, Wortley, Leeds on 20 September 1860. Emily was involved in the establishment of the Yorkshire Ladies Council of Education alongside Frances Lupton. Kitson and his wife Emily had issue:

- Albert Ernest Kitson, 2nd Baron Airedale (1863–1944)
- James Clifford Kitson (6 December 1864 – 25 September 1942)
- Charles Clifford Kitson – twin of James Clifford – (born 6 December 1864)
- Emily Kitson (born 1866)
- Edward Christian Kitson (born 1873); married at St Marylebone Parish Church on 14 February 1903 Mary Katharine Hirst, daughter of Samuel Hirst, of South Hampstead, London.
- (Alice) Hilda Kitson (1872–1944)

The death of his first wife Emily in 1873 hit Kitson hard. His sister-in-law Clara Talbot (née Cliff, died 1905), and her husband Grosvenor Talbot (1835–1926) were described as "lifelines", "tending to the grieving man and looking after his children". Kitson and Talbot were college friends and Talbot's sister Hannah married Kitson's brother Frederick William. Four years later, Frederick, a gifted engineer also died. Frederick's son Frederick James Kitson married Florence Talbot, his mother's cousin.

Kitson married Mary Laura Smith (died 1939) on 1 June 1881 and had issue:

- Roland Dudley Kitson, 3rd Baron Airedale (1882–1958)
- Olive Mary (born 1887)

== Mayors and lord mayors ==
Several members of the Kitson family were mayor or Lord Mayor of Leeds:

- In 1860 and 1861, James Kitson
- In 1896 and 1897, his son, Sir James Kitson MP (later the 1st Baron Airedale)
- In 1908 (and briefly in 1910), Frederick J Kitson
- In 1942, Jessie Beatrice Kitson

Lord Airedale's father, James Kitson was Mayor of Leeds in 1860–1861. A generation later it was his son who became the first Lord Mayor in 1896–1897.

The 1908 the lord mayor was Frederick James Kitson, Lord Airedale's nephew.

In late 1942, the elected lord mayor died suddenly, and the council asked a fourth Kitson to take over: Jessie Beatrice Kitson (born 1877), daughter of John Hawthorn Kitson (died 1899) the younger brother of the first Lord Airedale.

== Arms ==
Coat of arms of James Kitson, 1st Baron Airedale
Crest Issuant from park pales Proper a demi-unicorn Argent gorged with an annulet Azure. Escutcheon Or on a pale Azure a pike haurient of the first a chief of the second thereon an annulet between two millrinds erect of the field. Supporters On either side an owl close and affronteé Argent gorged with a collar Gules pendent therefrom an escutcheon of the arms. Motto Palmam Qui Meruit Ferat

Parliament of the United Kingdom
Preceded by Henry Beaumont	Member of Parliament for Colne Valley; 1892–1907	Succeeded by Victor Grayson
Party political offices
Preceded by Henry Fell Pease	President of the National Liberal Federation; 1883–1890	Succeeded by Robert Spence Watson
Peerage of the United Kingdom
New creation	Baron Airedale; 1907–1911	Succeeded by Albert Kitson
Baronetage of the United Kingdom
New creation	Baronet (of Gledhow); 1886–1911	Succeeded by Albert Kitson
