= Albert Kitson, 2nd Baron Airedale =

British peer (1863–1944)

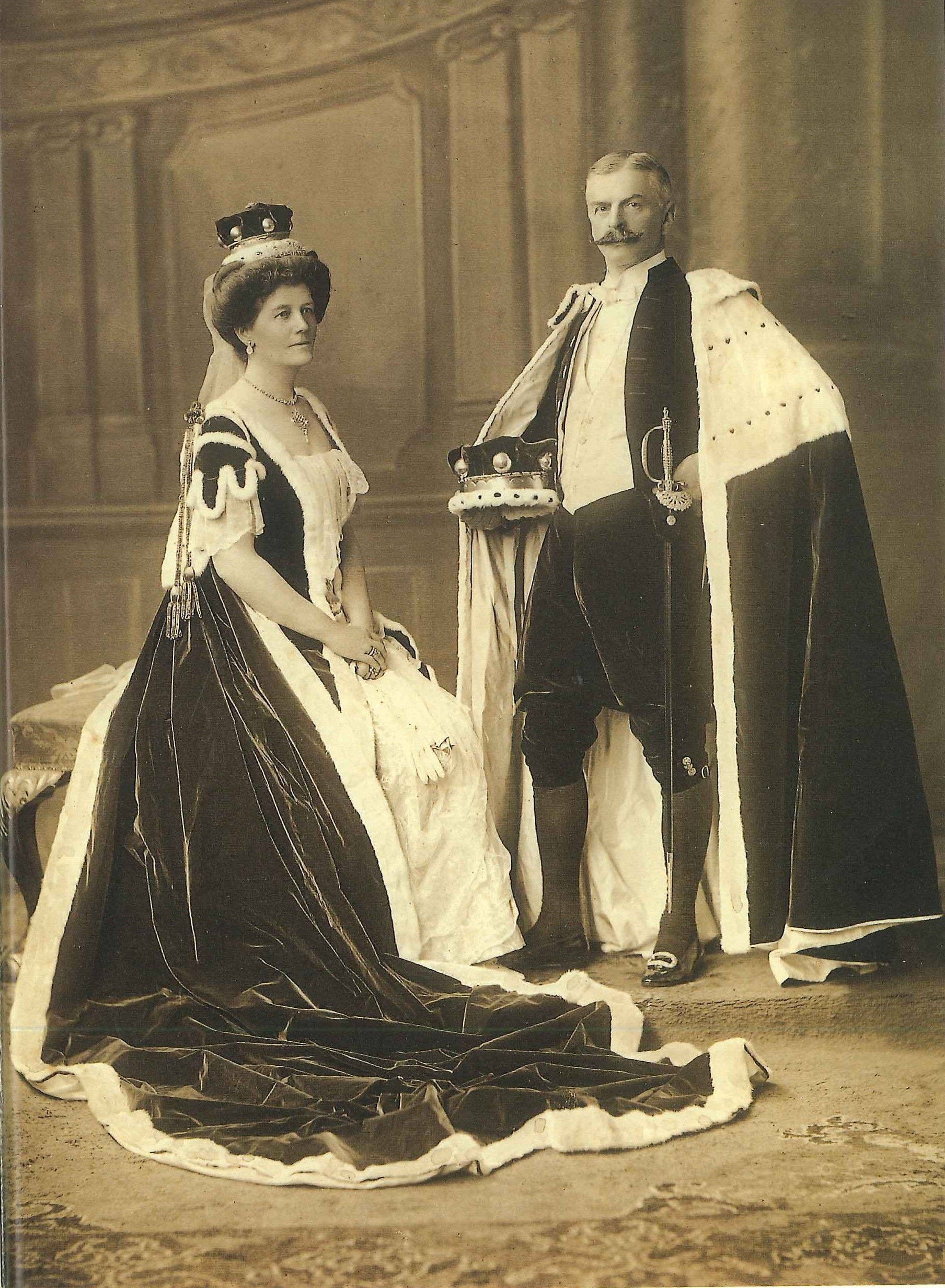
Lord and Lady Airedale at the coronation of King George V, 1911

Albert Ernest Kitson, 2nd Baron Airedale (7 October 1863 – 11 March 1944) was a British peer. He was inter alia a director of Midland Bank.

== Family ==
Kitson was the son of James Kitson, an iron and steel manufacturer in Leeds. He was educated at Rugby and Trinity College, Cambridge, where he gained a BA, before following his father into the family business.

On 23 January 1890, at Mill Hill Chapel in Leeds, Kitson married Florence Schunck (1868–1942), the daughter of Edward, Baron von Schunck and his wife Kate Lupton.

The Kitsons had seven daughters.

Kitson's father was elevated to the peerage in 1907. Albert Kitson succeeded to the titles of 2nd Baron Airedale of Gledhow and 2nd Baronet Kitson on his father's death on 16 March 1911. As peers of the realm, the Kitsons were invited to the coronation of George V at Westminster Abbey on 22 June 1911.

== Career, politics and interests ==
Kitson was a director of Midland Bank. He was president of the Yorkshire and Leeds Liberal Federations. Prime Minister H. H. Asquith was his guest at Gledhow Hall in November 1913.

Kitson was chairman of the finance committee and hon vice-president of the Iron and Steel Institute.

Like his father, Lord Airedale was a music-lover and supported the Leeds Triennial Musical Festival; in 1922, Kitson and his sister Hilda, were guarantors of the festival.

He owned one the country's finest collections of Leeds pottery and regularly competed in golf at The Royal and Ancient Golf Club of St Andrews.

When the Prime Minister's wife, Margaret Lloyd George, visited Leeds in December 1920 for a reception for women supporters of the Liberal Coalition, she stayed at Gledhow Hall.

== Gledhow Hall ==
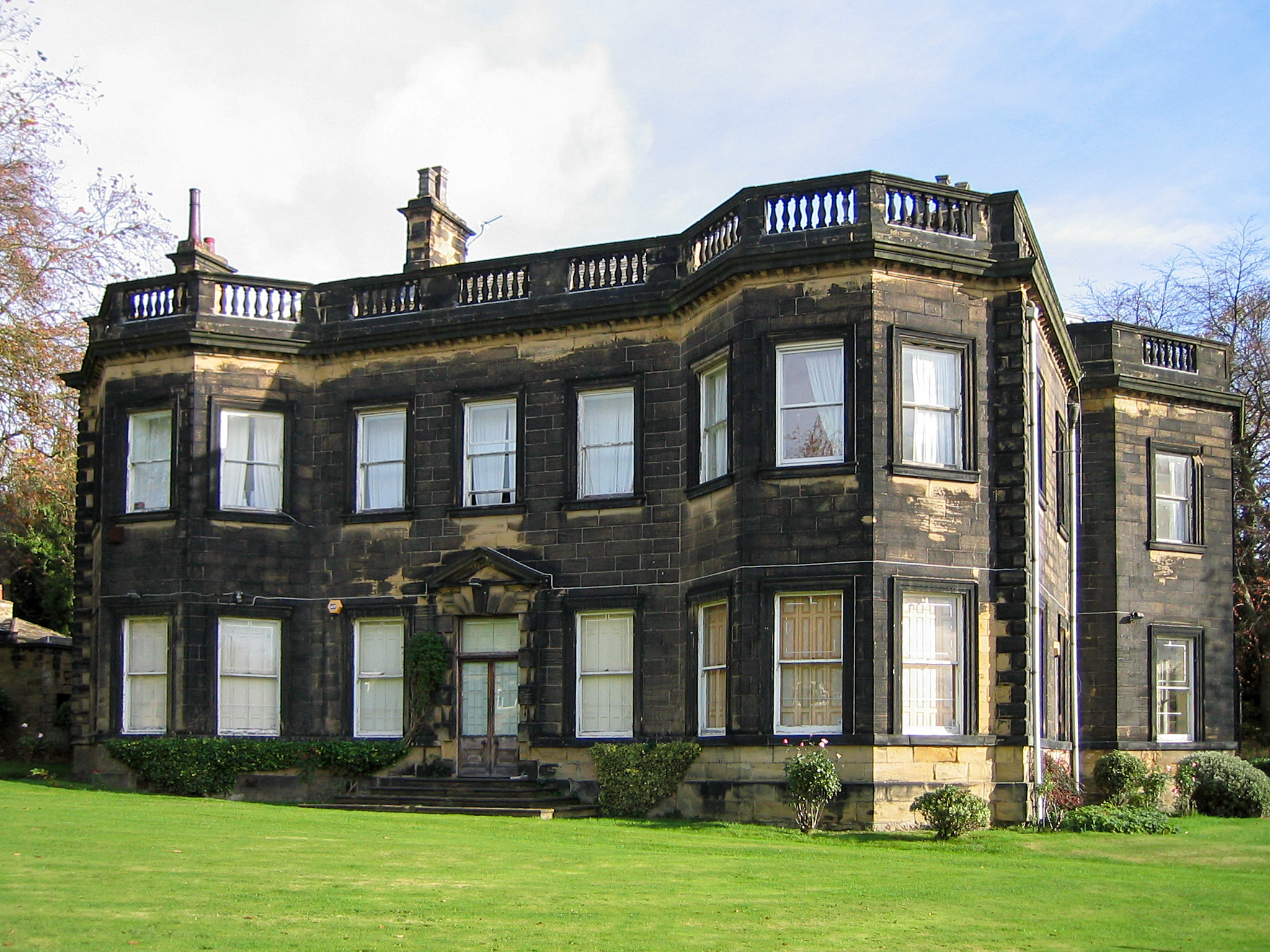
Gledhow Hall

Kitson inherited Gledhow Hall in 1911. During the First World War, he offered the hall for use as a Voluntary Aid Detachment hospital. The hospital was managed by the Headingley Company of the St John Ambulance Voluntary Aid Detachment (VAD). On 22 May 1915, 50 patients were moved to the hall from the 2nd Northern General Hospital at Becketts Park. Kitson's cousin, Edith Cliff, was the Commandant and his daughter Doris and her cousin Olive Middleton were VAD nurses. Kitson's family maintained an interest in nursing after the Great War.

The Kitson's London home, 3 Cadogan Square, was damaged by a bomb during the Second World War and they moved to Stansted in Essex.

== Death ==
Albert Kitson died on 11 March 1944 at Stansted and the barony was inherited by his younger half-brother Roland. His wife had died on 8 July 1942.

== Arms ==
Coat of arms of Albert Kitson, 2nd Baron Airedale
Crest Issuant from park pales Proper a demi-unicorn Argent gorged with an annulet Azure. Escutcheon Or on a pale Azure a pike haurient of the first a chief of the second thereon an annulet between two millrinds erect of the field. Supporters On either side an owl close and affronteé Argent gorged with a collar Gules pendent therefrom an escutcheon of the arms. Motto Palmam Qui Meruit Ferat

Peerage of the United Kingdom
Preceded by James Kitson	Baron Airedale; 1911–1944	Succeeded by Roland Kitson
