= Oliver Kitson, 4th Baron Airedale =

British peer

Oliver James Vandeleur Kitson, 4th Baron Airedale (22 April 1915 – 19 March 1996), "an able and devoted" politician, member of the Liberal Party and then of the Liberal Democrats, was a British peer.

He was the son of Sir Roland Dudley Kitson, 3rd Baron Airedale and his first wife Sheila Grace, daughter of F. E. Vandeleur. He was educated at Eton College and Trinity College, Cambridge and was called to the Bar, Inner Temple, in 1941. He lived at Ufford Hall near Stamford, Lincolnshire. He succeeded to the titles of 4th Baron Airedale, of Gledhow, and 4th Baronet on 20 March 1958. he was an active member of the House of Lords for 38 years: he was Deputy Speaker of the House of Lords from 1962 to 1996, Deputy Chairman of Committees in the House of Lords in 1961, and was a long-standing member of the Joint Committee on Statutory Instruments. Airedale did not marry and the titles became extinct on his death.

Coat of arms of Oliver Kitson, 4th Baron Airedale
| Crest Issuant from park pales Proper a demi-unicorn Argent gorged with an annulet Azure. Escutcheon Or on a pale Azure a pike haurient of the first a chief of the second thereon an annulet between two millrinds erect of the field. Supporters On either side an owl close and affronteé Argent gorged with a collar Gules pendent therefrom an escutcheon of the arms. Motto Palmam Qui Meruit Ferat |

Peerage of the United Kingdom
| Preceded by Roland Kitson | Baron Airedale; 1958–1996 | Extinct |
