= Gledhow =

Suburb of Leeds, West Yorkshire, England

Coordinates: 53.822°N 1.509°W

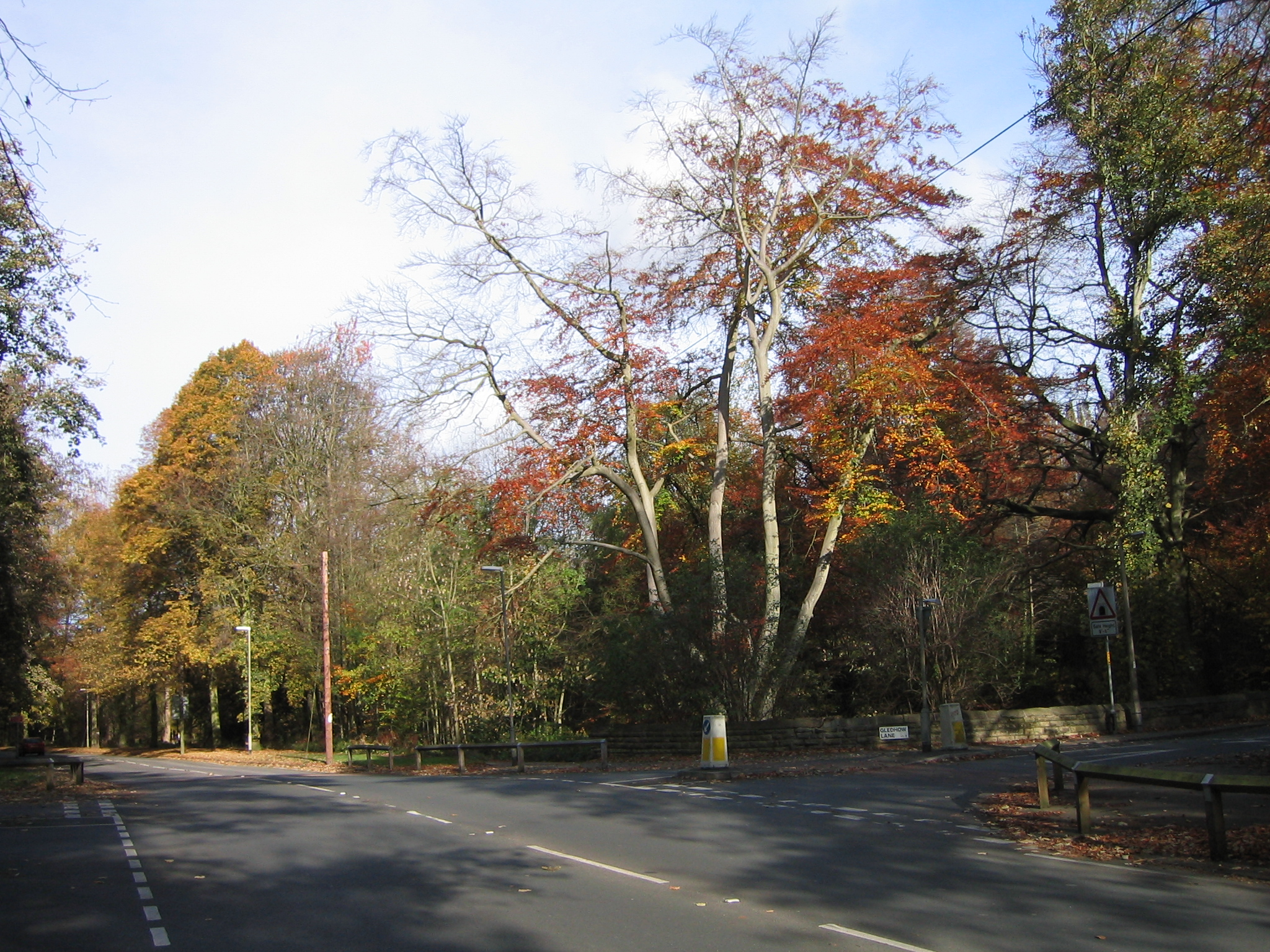
Gledhow Valley Road, junction with Gledhow Lane

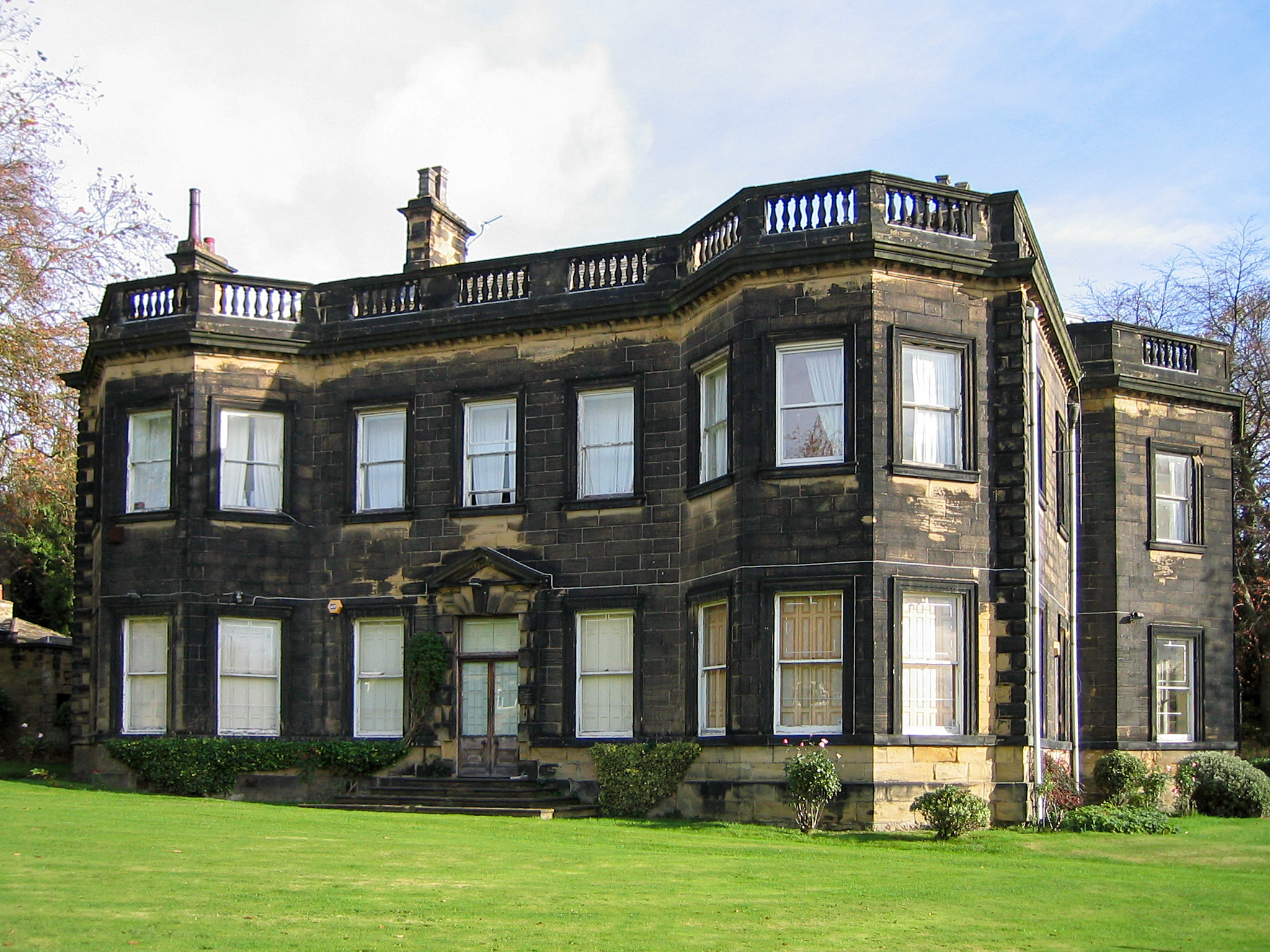
Gledhow Hall

Gledhow is a suburb of north-east Leeds, West Yorkshire, England, east of Chapel Allerton and west of Roundhay. It sits in the Roundhay ward of Leeds City Council and Leeds North East parliamentary constituency.

== Etymology ==
The name Gledhow is first attested the period 1334–37 as Gledhou. Its etymology is uncertain. The gled- element could plausibly come from the Old English words gleoda ('kite, bird of prey') or glēd ('embers, burning coals'). The second element could be from Old English hōh ('ridge, escarpment') or Old Norse haugr ('hill'). It has been suggested (in relation to similar names like Gledhill) that a gled- element may alternatively be based on the Old Norse 'å glede' (to please, or be glad about a subject) giving a translation of "Pleasant Hill".

== Description and history ==
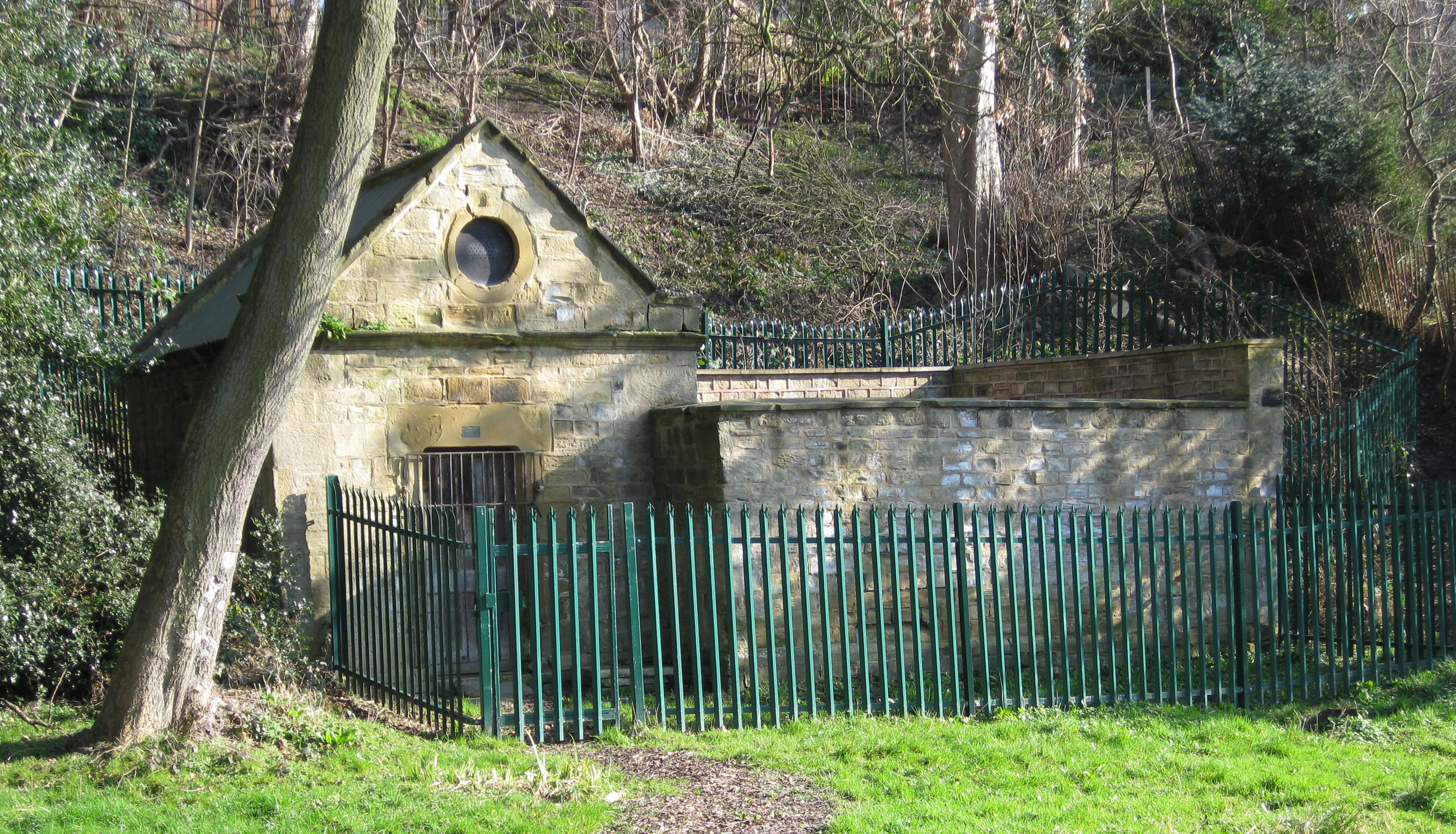
Gipton Spa

Well into the 19th century, Gledhow was known as a picturesque area of woodland near Leeds. It had become a suburb of Leeds by the late 19th century. Gledhow Valley is a strip of mixed deciduous woodland on either side of a beck and lake. Gipton Spa, a bathhouse dating from 1671, is in the woods. Passing through the valley is Gledhow Valley Road, built in 1926.

Gledhow Lane crosses Gledhow Valley Road and on the eastern side is a steep road up from the valley. A residential area near the top has been referred to as "Little Switzerland", although a Leeds City Council website refers to this as a "former" name.

== Notable people ==
- Arthur Louis Aaron, Leeds' only Second World War recipient of the Victoria Cross, was born in Gledhow.
- Sir Edmund Beckett, 4th Baronet (1787–1874), railway promoter and politician, was born at Gledhow Hall.
- Albert Johanneson, professional footballer (Leeds United) lived in Gledhow Towers.
- James Kitson, 1st Baron Airedale, industrialist and MP.
- Albert Kitson, 2nd Baron Airedale, inter alia a director of Midland Bank and British peer.

== Parks and green spaces ==
The Green is a small green space located on the junction Gledhow Lane, Lidgett Lane and Gledhow Wood Road. It is identified in the Gledhow Valley Conservation Area Appraisal as an important green space that has been harmed by visually unsympathetic highway works.

== Gallery ==
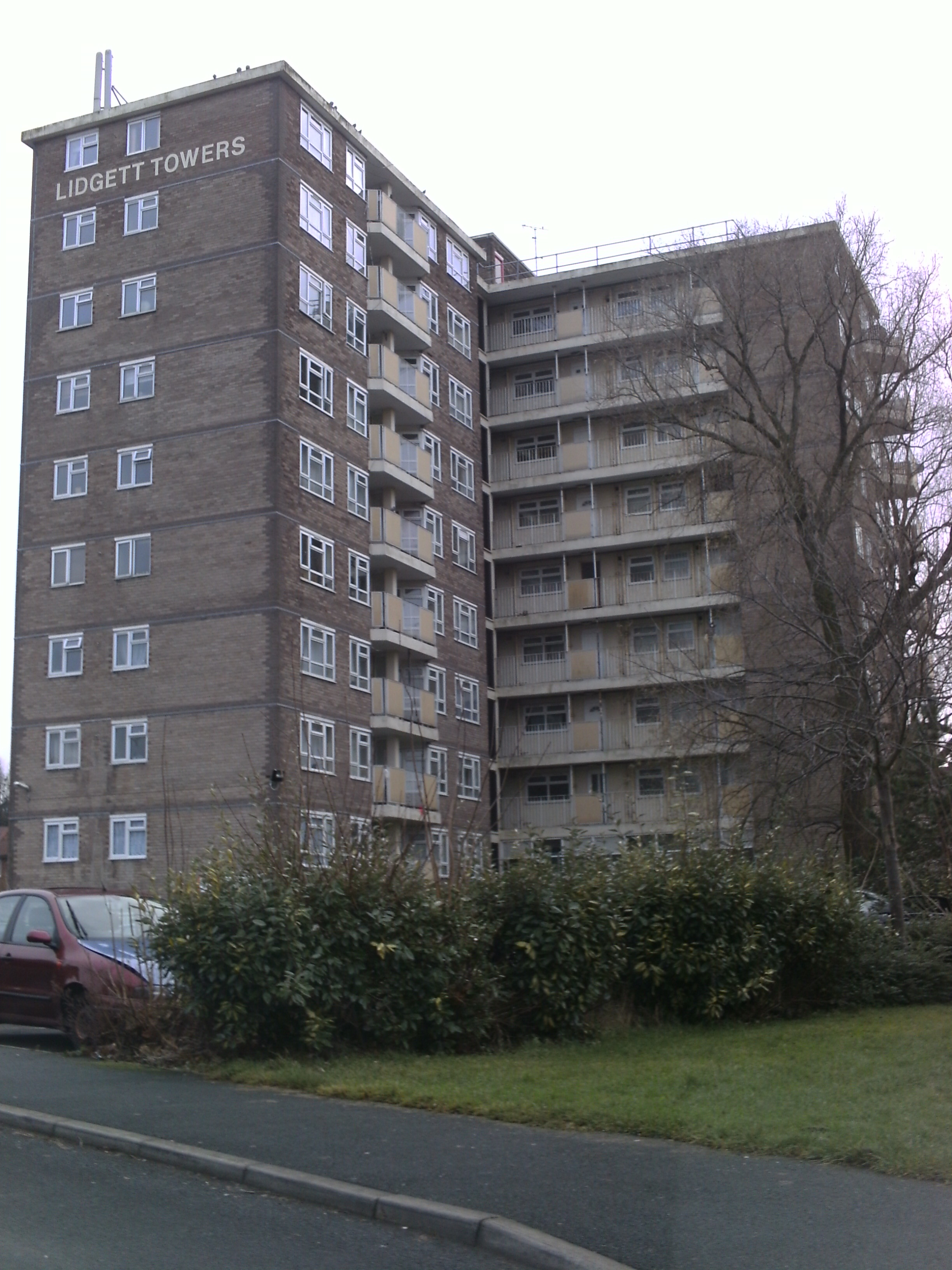
Lidgett Towers

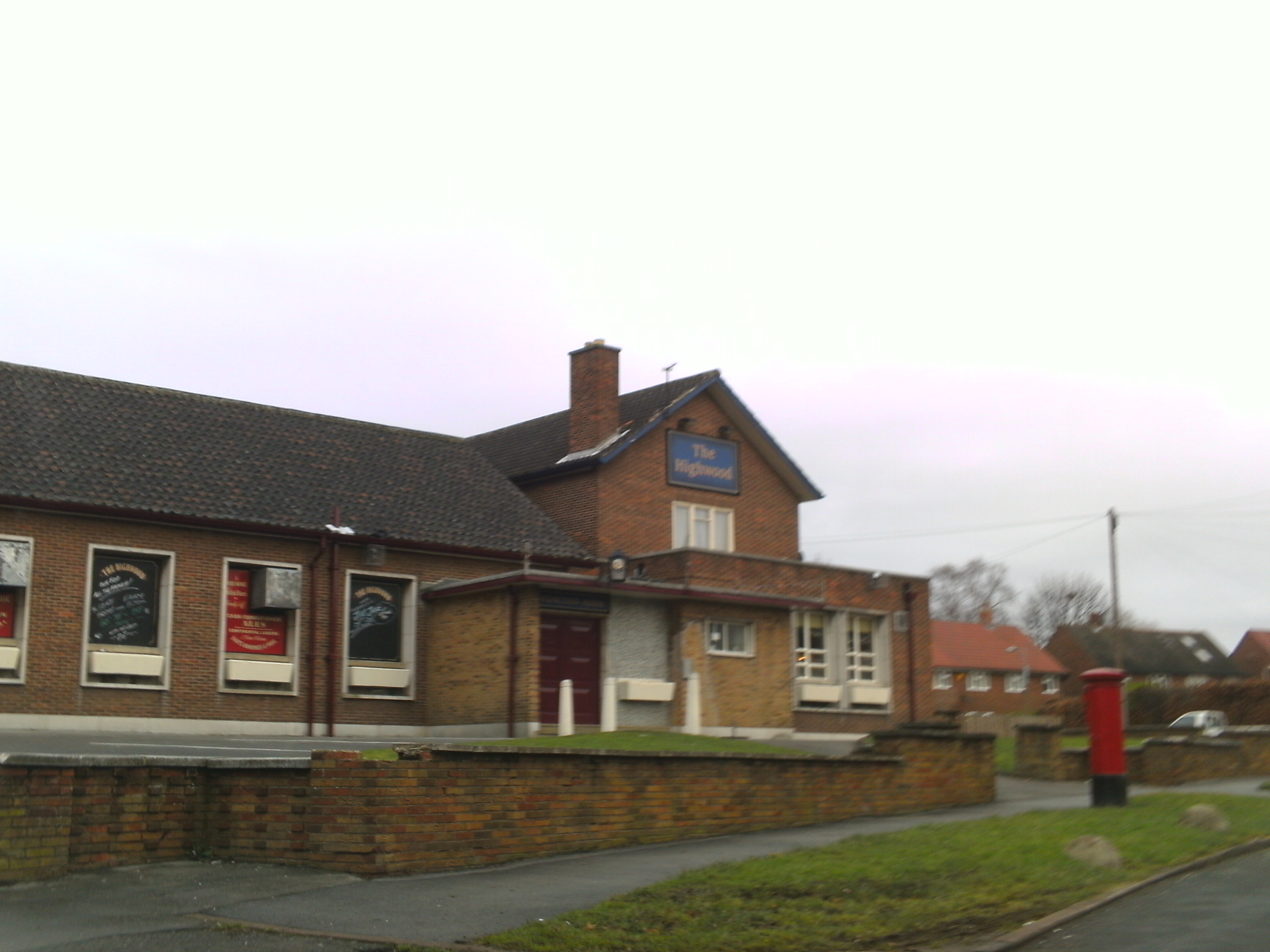
The Highwood public house

== See also ==
- Listed buildings in Leeds (Roundhay Ward)
