= David Foster (disambiguation) =

David Foster (born 1949) is a Canadian musician, record producer, and pianist.

David Foster may also refer to:

- Dave Foster, American drummer, briefly with Nirvana in 1988
- Dave Foster (guitarist), English progressive rock guitarist
- David Foster (cricketer, born 1959), English cricketer
- David Foster (equestrian) (1955–1998), Irish equestrian
- David Foster (novelist) (born 1944), Australian novelist
- David Foster (Royal Navy officer) (1920–2010), pilot
- David Foster (rugby league) (born 1980), rugby league footballer of the 1990s and 2000s
- David Foster (woodchopper) (born 1957), Australian woodchopper
- David J. Foster (1857–1912), U.S. representative from Vermont
- David Jack Foster (1859–1948), U.S. brigadier general during World War I
- David Foster (writer), American television writer (House), producer and medical doctor
- David Blythe Foster (1858–1948), British politician, Lord Mayor of Leeds
- David Kirby Foster (1882–1969), Baptist minister, community leader and counselor to President Harry S. Truman
- David Foster (film producer) (1929–2019), American film producer (The Mask of Zorro, The Thing)
- David Foster (1946–2017), vocalist, songwriter and bass guitarist (The Warriors, Badger)
- David Foster Wallace (1962–2008), American novelist and social critic

== See also ==
- David Foster (album), 1986
- David Foster (game character)
- David Foster Wallace (1962–2008), American novelist, essayist, and short-story writer
