= Mayors in England =

Public office in England

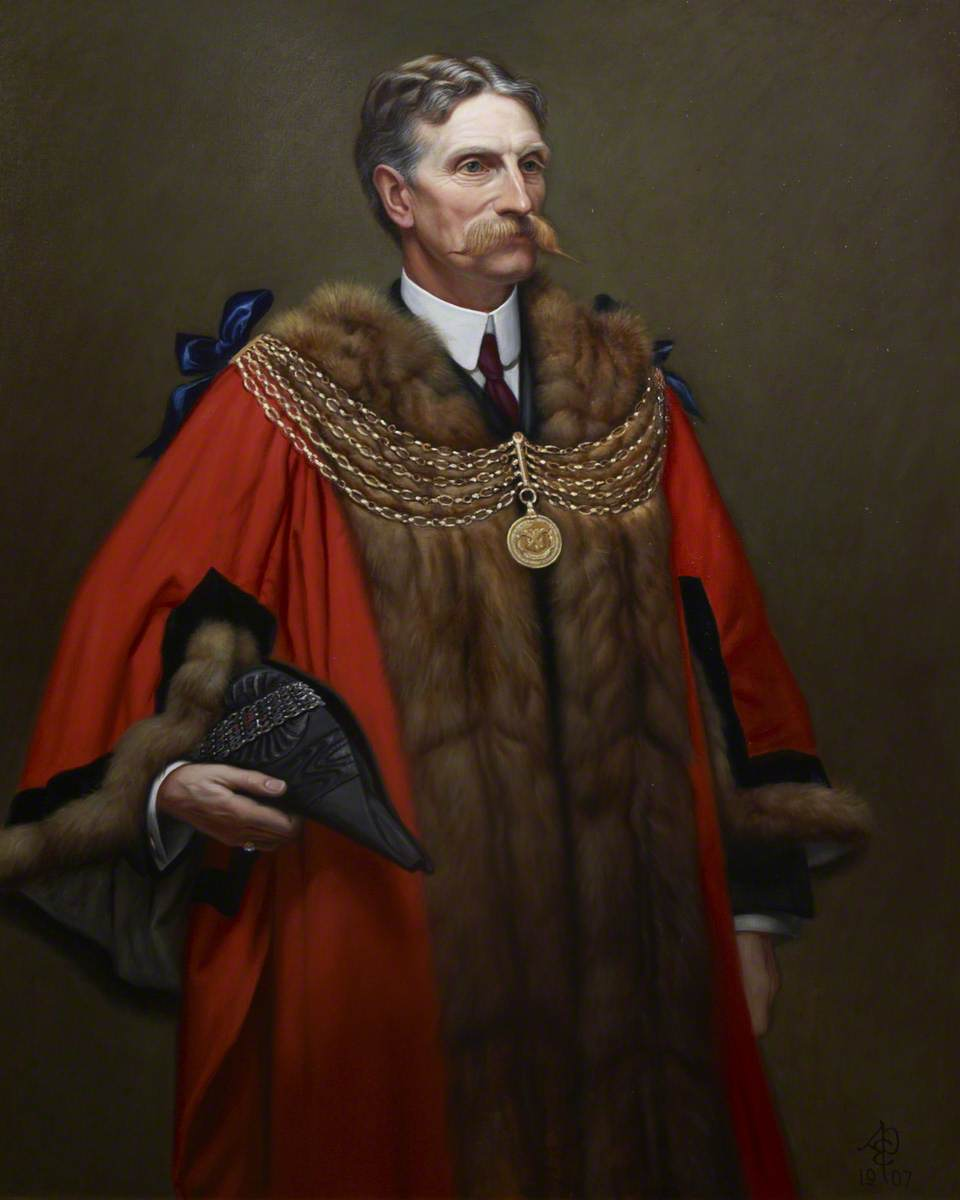
Painting of John Frederick Winnicott, mayor of Plymouth in the early 20th century, in mayoral regalia

In England, the office of mayor has several different roles. Until 2000, the only type of mayors were ceremonial mayors and lord mayors which have existed for centuries and are largely apolitical roles. More recently, powerful directly elected strategic authority mayors have been established to lead large areas of England and directly elected local authority mayors have been introduced in some areas.

== Strategic authority mayors ==
Strategic authority mayors are directly elected by local voters for four-year terms to lead a strategic authority, in which they have devolved powers over public services such as transport, skills, housing, local infrastructure, and economic development. As of June 2026, England has 14 strategic authority mayors.

== Directly elected local authority mayors ==
Most English local authorities are led by a council leader who is a councillor indirectly elected by the other councillors. The Local Government Act 2000 gave principal councils in England the right to hold a local referendum on whether to establish a directly elected local authority mayor to lead the council. As of June 2026, England has 13 directly elected local authority mayors.

== Ceremonial mayors ==
A ceremonial mayor is traditionally a local councillor, chosen from amongst fellow councillors, to be the ceremonial chair of a city, royal borough, borough, or town council in England. They have the status as first citizen, after the Sovereign, in their local authority area. A ceremonial mayor's one-year term of office denotes the municipal year.

In the following types of English local authority, the chair of the council is not typically entitled to be addressed as mayor. They otherwise have exactly the same role and status.

- County councils
- District councils that have not been awarded city, royal borough, or borough status
- Parish councils that have not declared themselves by resolution to be a town council

=== Election ===
In England, where a borough or a city is a local government district or a civil parish, the mayor is elected annually by the council from their number and chairs meetings with a casting vote. Where the mayoralty used to be associated with a local government district, but that district has been abolished, charter trustees can be established to provide continuity until a parish council may be set up. Where a parish council (whether the successor of a former borough or not) has resolved to style itself a town council, then its chair is entitled to the designation of town mayor, though in practice, the word "town" is often dropped.

=== Lord mayors ===
The right to appoint a lord mayor is a rare honour, even less frequently bestowed than city status.

Currently, 24 cities in England have lord mayors:

- Birmingham
- Bradford
- Bristol
- Canterbury
- Chester
- Coventry
- Exeter
- Kingston upon Hull
- Leeds
- Leicester
- Liverpool
- City of London
- Manchester
- Newcastle upon Tyne
- Norwich
- Nottingham
- Oxford
- Plymouth
- Portsmouth
- Sheffield
- Southampton
- Stoke-on-Trent
- City of Westminster
- York

=== Honorifics ===
The Lord Mayors of London and York are styled The Right Honourable. All other Lord Mayors, as well as the Mayors of cities and the original Cinque Ports (Sandwich, Hythe, Dover, Romney and Hastings), are styled The Right Worshipful. (Bristol styles its lord mayor "Right Honourable" instead, but this usage is without official sanction). All other Mayors are styled The Worshipful, though this is in practice rarely used for a Town Mayor. These honorific styles are used only before the Mayoral title and not before the name, and are not retained after the term of office.

A mayor can also be styled Mr Mayor and usually appoints a consort, typically a spouse, other family member or fellow councillor. In England (and the Commonwealth), the designated female consort of a mayor is usually styled Mayoress or occasionally Mrs Mayor and accompanies the mayor to civic functions. A female mayor is also called mayor, not, as sometimes erroneously called, "Lady Mayoress". A mayoress or Lady Mayoress is a female consort of a mayor or Lord Mayor; a male consort of a mayor or Lord Mayor is a Mayor's Consort or Lord Mayor's Consort.

== See also ==
- Local government in England
- Municipal year
- Lord Mayor of London
- Combined authorities and combined county authorities
