= General Foster =

General Foster may refer to:

- David Jack Foster (1859–1948), U.S. Army brigadier general
- George P. Foster (1835–1879), Union Army brevet brigadier general
- Harry Wickwire Foster (1902–1964), Canadian Army major general
- Hubert Foster (1855–1919), Australian Army brigadier general
- Hugh F. Foster Jr. (1918–2004), U.S. Army major general
- Ira Roe Foster (1811–1885), Georgia Militia brigadier general
- John G. Foster (1823–1874), Union Army major general
- Kent Foster (born c. 1938), Canadian Army lieutenant general
- Mayhew Foster (1911–2011), U.S. Air Force brigadier general
- Richard Foster (Royal Marines officer) (1879–1965), Royal Marines general
- Robert Sanford Foster (1834–1903), Union Army brigadier general and brevet major general
- Steven E. Foster (fl. 1970s–2010s), U.S. Air National Guard major general
- William Wasbrough Foster (1875–1954), Canadian Army major general

== See also ==
- Attorney General Foster (disambiguation)
