= List of mayors of Leeds =

Lord Mayor of Leeds
- Coat of arms of Leeds City Council
- Incumbent; Cllr Stephen Holroyd since 2026
- Style: The Right Worshipful
- Status: Lord Mayor
- Member of: Leeds City Council
- Term length: One municipal year ends in May 2026
- Precursor: Mayor of Leeds (1661–1897)
- Formation: 12 July 1897
- Website: Official website

The Lord Mayor of Leeds (until 1897 known as the Mayor of Leeds) is a ceremonial post held by a member of Leeds City Council, elected annually by the council.

By charter from King Charles I in 1626, the leader of the governing body of the borough of Leeds was an alderman, the first holder being Sir John Savile. A second charter, in 1661 from King Charles II, granted the title Mayor to Thomas Danby, after whom Thomas Danby College was named. In 1893 the County Borough of Leeds was granted city status, and in 1897 Queen Victoria conferred the title of Lord Mayor on James Kitson.

The first woman to have the post was Jessie Beatrice Kitson in 1942: she was elected following the death of Arthur Clarke shortly after his election.

In 2019, the council elected Leeds' first ever black Lord Mayor, Eileen Taylor. After serving as a Labour member of council since 2008, she was elected unanimously by fellow councillors at the authority's annual general meeting. Due to the COVID-19 pandemic, Taylor's term was extended for another municipal year until May 2021, the first time a Lord Mayor has served for two municipal years since George Brett's original term of office (1947–48) was extended for a municipal year until 1949. Under the Representation of the People Act 1948, his term was extended until the first meeting held after the May 1949 council election.

In 2026, Stephen Holroyd became the first openly gay Lord Mayor of Leeds, with his partner Simon Mapals styled as Lord Mayor's consort.

Notable former Mayors include Benjamin Gott (1799), Sir George Goodman (1836), several of the Lupton family, Henry Rowland Marsden (1873) and Alf Cooke of the famous printworks (1890).

== List of Lord Mayors ==
| Municipal year | Mayor of Leeds |
|---|---|
| November 9, 1835 | Griffith Wright |
| January 1, 1836 | George Goodman |
| November 9, 1836 | James Williamson, M.D. |
| 1837 | Thomas William Tottie |
| 1838 | James Holdfirth |
| 1839 | William Smith |
| 1840 | William Smith |
| 1841 | William Pawson |
| 1842 | Henry Cowper Marshall |
| 1843 | Hamer Stansfeld |
| 1844 | Darnton Lupton |
| 1845 | John Darnton Luccock |
| 1846 | C. G. Maclea |
| 1847 | Francis Carbutt |
| 1848 | John Hope Shaw |
| 1849 | Joseph Bateson |
| 1850 | George Goodman |
| 1851 | George Goodman |

| Municipal year | Mayor of Leeds |
|---|---|
| November 1865 | Henry Oxley |
| November 1866 | Andrew Fairbairn |
| November 1867 | Andrew Fairbairn |

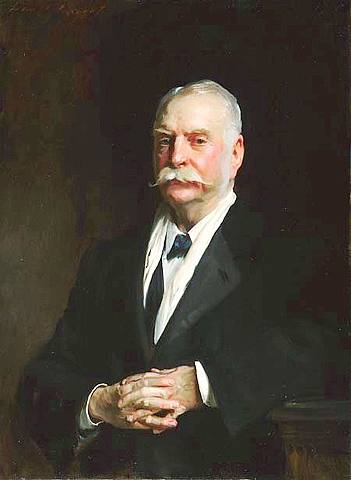
Sir James Kitson, 1st Baron Airedale, first Lord Mayor of Leeds, 1896–97

Robert Armitage, Lord Mayor of Leeds, 1904–1905.

William Middlebrook, Lord Mayor of Leeds, 1910–1911.

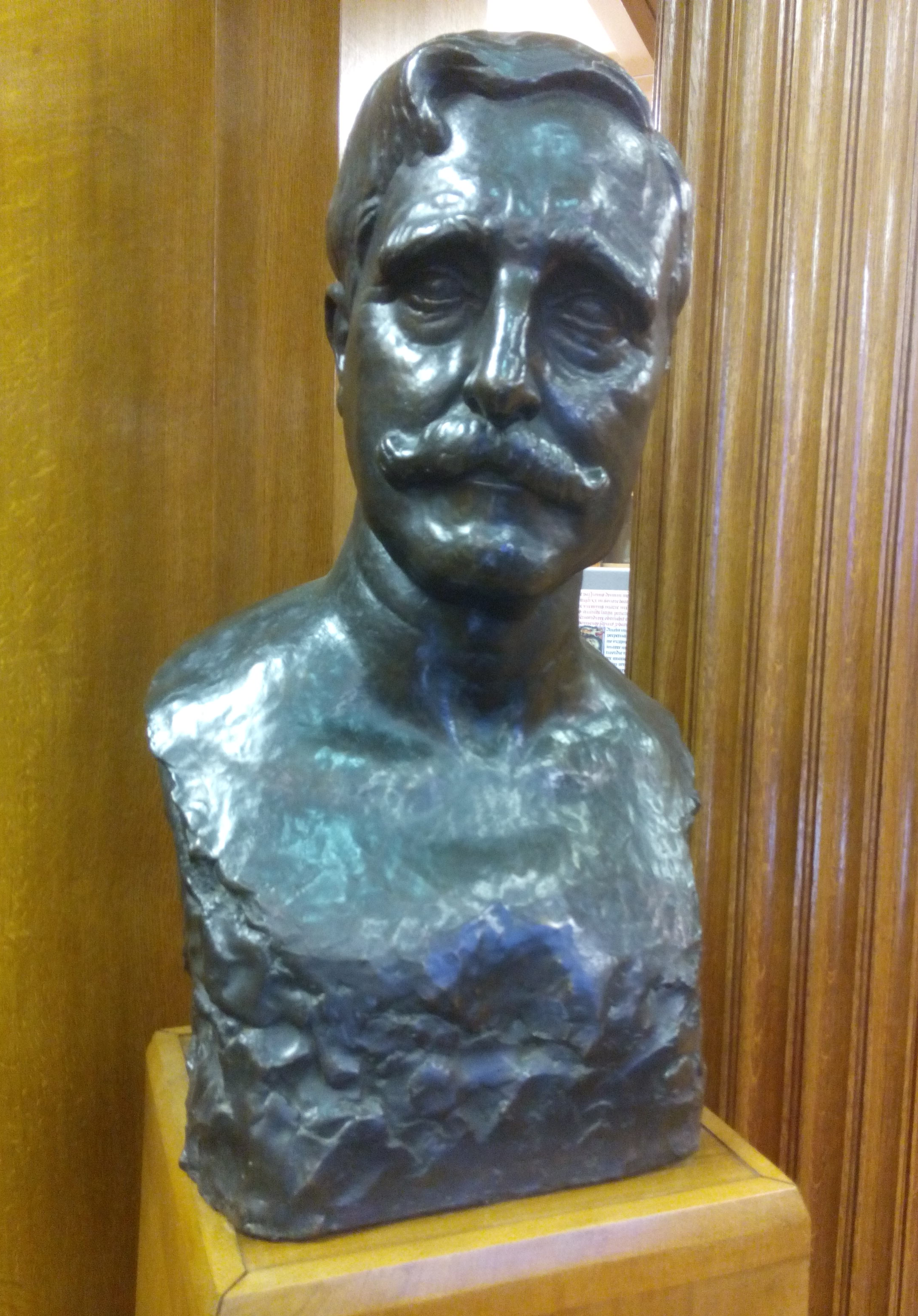
Edward Brotherton, 1st Baron Brotherton, Lord Mayor of Leeds, 1913–1914

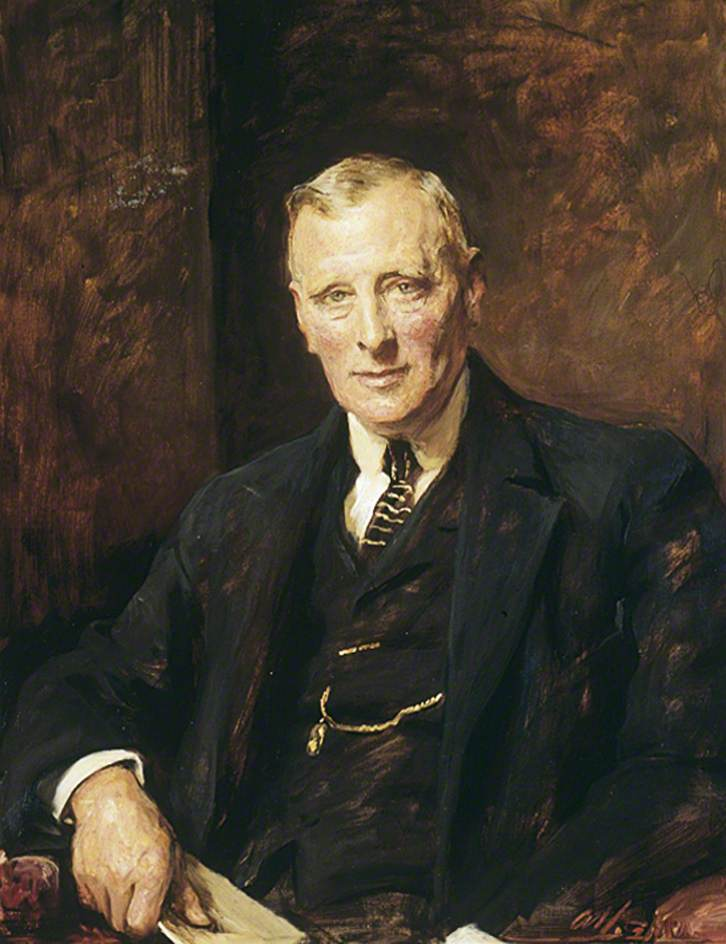
Sir Charles Lupton, Lord Mayor of Leeds, 1915–1916

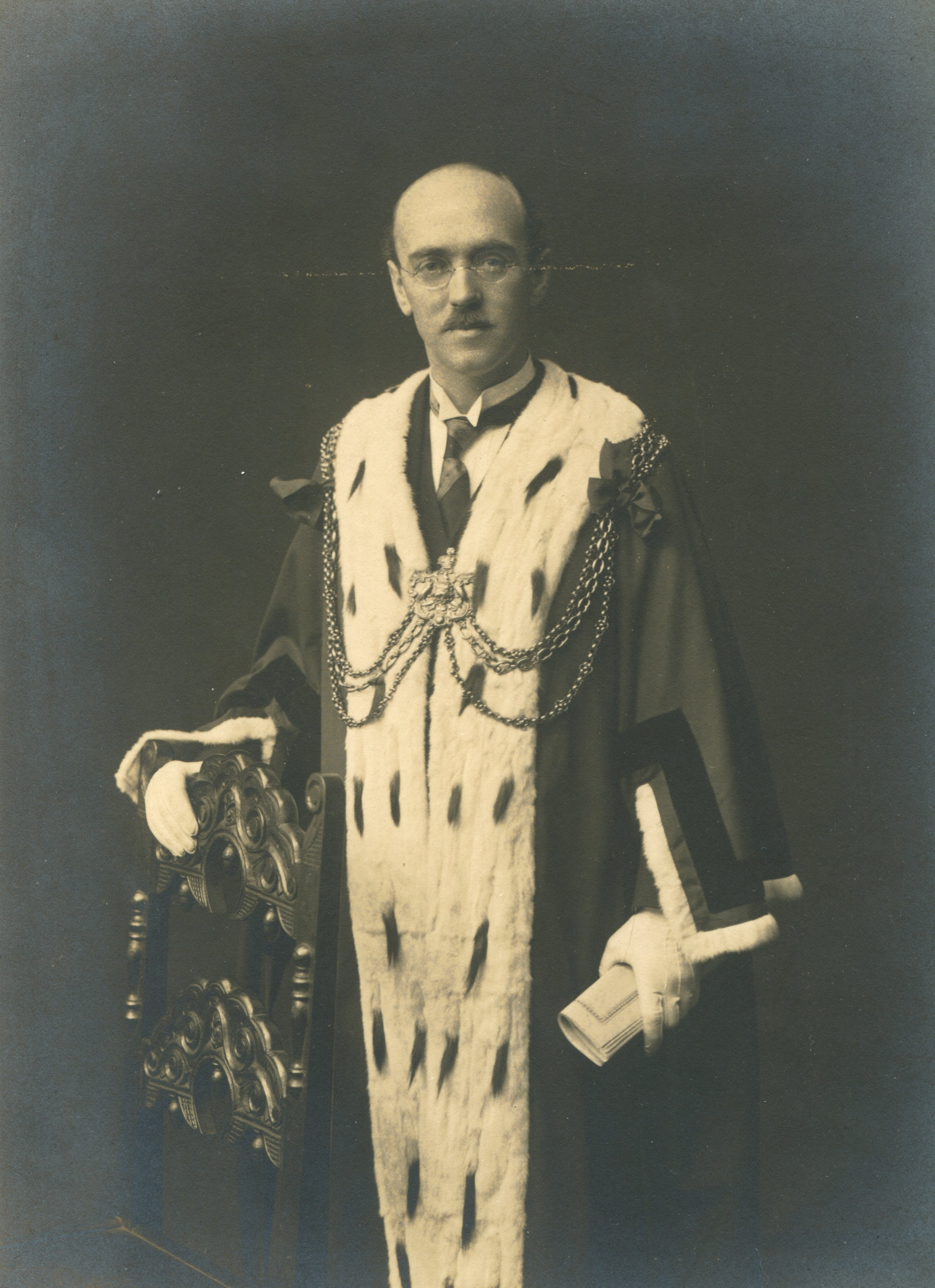
Sir Edwin Airey, Lord Mayor of Leeds, 1923–1924

| Municipal year | Lord Mayor (party nomination - electoral ward if councillor) |
|---|---|
| 1897-1898 | Sir James Kitson, MP for Colne Valley, 1892 (Lib) |
| 1898-1899 | Thomas Walter Harding (LUP) |
| 1899-1900 | John Gordon (Con) |
| 1900-1901 | Frederick W. Lawson (?) |
| 1901-1902 | Ambrose Edmund Butler (?) |
| 1902-1903 | Sir John Ward (?) |
| 1903-1904 | Arthur Currer Briggs (?) |
| 1904-1905 | Robert Armitage, MP for Leeds Central, 1906 (Lib) |
| 1905-1906 | Edwin Woodhouse (?) |
| 1906-1907 | Joseph Hepworth (?) |
| 1907-1908 | Wilfred Lawrence Hepton (?) |
| 1908-1909 | Frederick J Kitson (Lib) |
| 1909-1910 | William Penrose Green (Con) |
| 1910-1911 | William Middlebrook, MP for Leeds South, 1908 (Lib) |
| 1911-1912 | William Nicholson (?) |
| 1912-1913 | Albert Wellesley Bain (?) |
| 1913-1914 | Edward Brotherton, 1st Baron Brotherton (Con) |
| 1914-1915 | James Edward Bedford (?) |
| 1915-1916 | Sir Charles Lupton (Con) |
| 1916-1917 | Edmund George Arnold (Lib nominated) |
| 1917-1918 | Frank Gott (?) |
| 1918-1919 | Joseph Henry |
| 1919-1920 | Thomas Beveridge Duncan (?) |
| 1920-1921 | Albert Braithwaite (Con) |
| 1921-1922 | Willie Hodgson (?) |
| 1922-1923 | Frank Fountain (?) |
| 1923-1924 | Sir Edwin Airey (Con) |
| 1924-1925 | Charles Granville Gibson (?) |
| 1925-1926 | John Arnott (Lab) |
| 1926-1927 | Hugh Lupton (Con) |
| 1927-1928 | George Ratcliffe (Lib) |
| 1928-1929 | David Blythe Foster (Lab) |
| 1929-1930 | Nathaniel George Morrison (?) |
| 1930-1931 | Arthur Hawkyard (?) |
| 1931-1932 | Fred Simpson, MP for Ashton-under-Lyne, 1935 (Lab) |
| 1932-1933 | Robert Holliday Blackburn (Con) |
| 1933-1934 | Albert Edward Wilkinson (Lib) |
| 1934-1935 | William Hemingway (Lab) |
| 1935-1936 | Percival Tookey Leigh (?) |
| 1936-1937 | Tom Coombs (?) |
| 1937-1938 | John Badlay (Lab) |
| 1938-1939 | Rowland Winn (Con) |
| 1939-1940 | Charles Humphrey Boyle (Lib) |
| 1940-1941 | Willie Withey (?) |
| 1941-1942 | Hyman Morris (Con) |
| 1942-1943 | Arthur Clarke (Lib) died 9 November 1942 |
| 1942-1943 | Jessie B Kitson (Ind, Lib nominated) |
| 1943-1944 | Albert Hayes (?) |
| 1944-1945 | Charles Vivian Walker (?) |
| 1945-1946 | David Beevers (Labour) |
| 1946-1947 | Sir George Martin (Con) |
| 1947-1948 | George Brett (Labour) |
| 1948-1949 | George Brett (Labour) |
| 1949-1950 | Norman Vine (?) |
| 1950-1951 | Francis Hugh O’Donnell (?) |
| 1951-1952 | Francis Eric Tetley (?) |
| 1952-1953 | Frank Barlow Burnley (?) |
| 1953-1954 | Donald George Cowling (?) |
| 1954-1955 | Henry Sidman Vick (?) |
| 1955-1956 | Sir James Croysdale (?) |
| 1956-1957 | Thomas Austin Jessop (?) |
| 1957-1958 | Joseph Hiley (?) |
| 1958-1959 | Mary Pearce (?) |
| 1959-1960 | Gertrude Annie Stevenson (?) |
| 1960-1961 | Lillian Hammond (?) |
| 1961-1962 | Percival Arthur Woorward (?) |
| 1962-1963 | Harold Watson (?) |
| 1963-1964 | Edwin Wooler (?) |
| 1964-1965 | Lizzie Naylor (?) |
| 1965-1966 | William R Hargreave (?) |
| 1966-1967 | Joshua "Jos" Walsh (Lab) |
| 1967-1968 | Lawrence Turnbull (?) |
| 1968-1969 | John Rafferty (?) |
| 1969-1970 | Allan Roberts Bretherick (?) |
| 1970-1971 | Arthur Brown (?) |
| 1971-1972 | John Trevor V Watson (?) |
| 1972-1973 | Albert Smith (Lab) |
| 1973-1974 | Kenneth Davison (Con) |
| 1974-1975 | Joan de Carteret (?) |
| 1975-1976 | Alan Pedley (Con, Headingley) |
| 1976-1977 | Ernest Howard Morris (Lab, City & Woodhouse) |
| 1977-1978 | William Hudson (Con, Aireborough) |
| 1978-1979 | Harry Booth (Lab, Beeston & Holbeck) |
| 1979-1980 | Christine Thomas (Con, Chapel Allerton & Scott Hall) |
| 1980-1981 | Eric Atkinson (Lab, Bramley) |
| 1981-1982 | Patrick "Paddy" Crotty (Con, Roundhay) |
| 1982-1983 | Doreen Jenner (Lab, University) |
| 1983-1984 | Martin Dodgson (Con, Halton) |
| 1984-1985 | Douglas Gabb (Lab, Seacroft) |
| 1985-1986 | Sydney Symmonds (Con, Moortown) |
| 1986-1987 | Rose Lund (Lab, Rothwell) |
| 1987-1988 | Doreen Wood (Con, Halton) |
| 1988-1989 | Arthur Vollans (Lab, Seacroft) |
| 1989-1990 | Leslie "Les" Carter (Con, Cookridge) |
| 1990-1991 | Bill Kilgallon (Lab, University) |
| 1991-1992 | Ronald "Ronnie" Feldman (Con, North) |
| 1992-1993 | Denise Atkinson (Lab, Bramley) |
| 1993-1994 | Keith Loudon (Con, Cookridge) |
| 1994-1995 | Christiana Myers (Lab, City & Holbeck) |
| 1995-1996 | Margaret "Peggy" White (Con, Roundhay) |
| 1996-1997 | Malcolm Bedford (Lab, Wortley) |
| 1997-1998 | Linda Middleton (Lab, Middleton) |
| 1998-1999 | Graham Kirkland (LD, Otley & Wharfedale) |
| 1999-2000 | Keith Parker (Lab, Barwick & Kippax) |
| 2000-2001 | Bernard Atha (Lab, Kirkstall) |
| 2001-2002 | David Hudson (Con, Wetherby) |
| 2002-2003 | Bryan North (Lab, Morley South) |
| 2003-2004 | Neil Taggart (Lab, Chapel Allerton) |
| 2004-2005 | Christopher "Chris" Townsley (LD, Horsforth) |
| 2005-2006 | William "Bill" Hyde (Con, Temple Newsam) |
| 2006-2007 | Mohammed Iqbal (Lab, City & Hunslet) |
| 2007-2008 | Brian Cleasby (LD, Horsforth) |
| 2008-2009 | Frank Robinson (Con, Calverley & Farsley) |
| 2009-2010 | Judith Elliott (MBI, Morley South) |
| 2010-2011 | James "Jim" McKenna (Lab, Armley) |
| 2011-2012 | Revd Alan Taylor (LD, Gipton & Harehills) |
| 2012-2013 | Ann Castle (Con, Harewood) |
| 2013-2014 | Thomas "Tom" Murray (Lab, Garforth & Swillington) |
| 2014-2015 | David Congreve (Lab, Beeston & Holbeck) |
| 2015-2016 | Judith Chapman (LD, Weetwood) |
| 2016-2017 | Gerald "Gerry" Harper (Lab, Hyde Park & Woodhouse) |
| 2017-2018 | Jane Dowson (Lab, Chapel Allerton) |
| 2018-2019 | Graham Latty (Con, Guiseley & Rawdon) |
| 2019-2020 | Eileen Taylor (Lab, Chapel Allerton) (Note: Taylor's original one-year term (2019-2020) was extended for an extra municipal year following the COVID-19 pandemic and postponement of the council's Annual Council Meeting and Mayor Making ceremony of a new Lord Mayor for the 2020-2021 municipal year. It was the first time a Lord Mayor had served for two municipal years since George Brett's original term of office (1947-1948) was extended for a municipal year until 1949. Under the Representation of the People Act 1948, his term was extended until the first meeting held after the May 1949 council election.) |
| 2020-2021 | Eileen Taylor (Lab, Chapel Allerton) |
| 2021-2022 | Asghar Khan (Lab, Burmantofts and Richmond Hill) |
| 2022-2023 | Robert "Bob" Gettings (MBI, Morley North) |
| 2023-2024 | Al Garthwaite (Lab, Headingley and Hyde Park) |
| 2024-2025 | Abigail Marshall Katung (Lab, Little London and Woodhouse) |
| 2025-2026 | Dan Cohen (Con, Alwoodley) |
| 2026-2027 | Stephen Holroyd (Lab, Ardsley and Robin Hood) |
