= Attorney General Foster =

Attorney General Foster may refer to:

- Dwight Foster (politician, born 1828) (1828–1884), Attorney General of Massachusetts
- Joseph Foster (politician) (born 1959), Attorney General of New Hampshire
- William John Foster (1831–1909), Attorney General of New South Wales

== See also ==
- General Foster (disambiguation)
