= Roger Lupton =

English priest

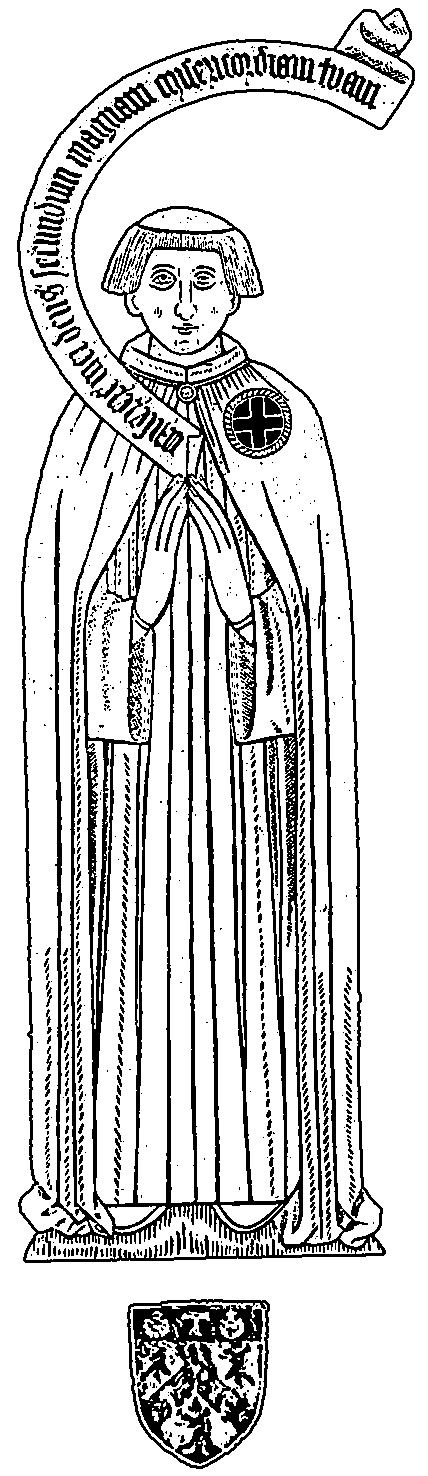
Rubbing of monumental brass in Eton College Chapel, of Roger Lupton (d.1540). His hair displays the tonsure of a cleric. He wears the mantle of a Canon of Windsor (based in St George's Chapel, Windsor Castle), displaying on his left shoulder a Cross of St George within a circle. A speech scroll emanating from his chest is inscribed in the Latin with the opening words of Psalm 51: Miserere mei Deus secundum magnam misericordiam tuam ("Have mercy upon me, O God, according to thy loving kindness"). Below is an heraldic escutcheon displaying his arms

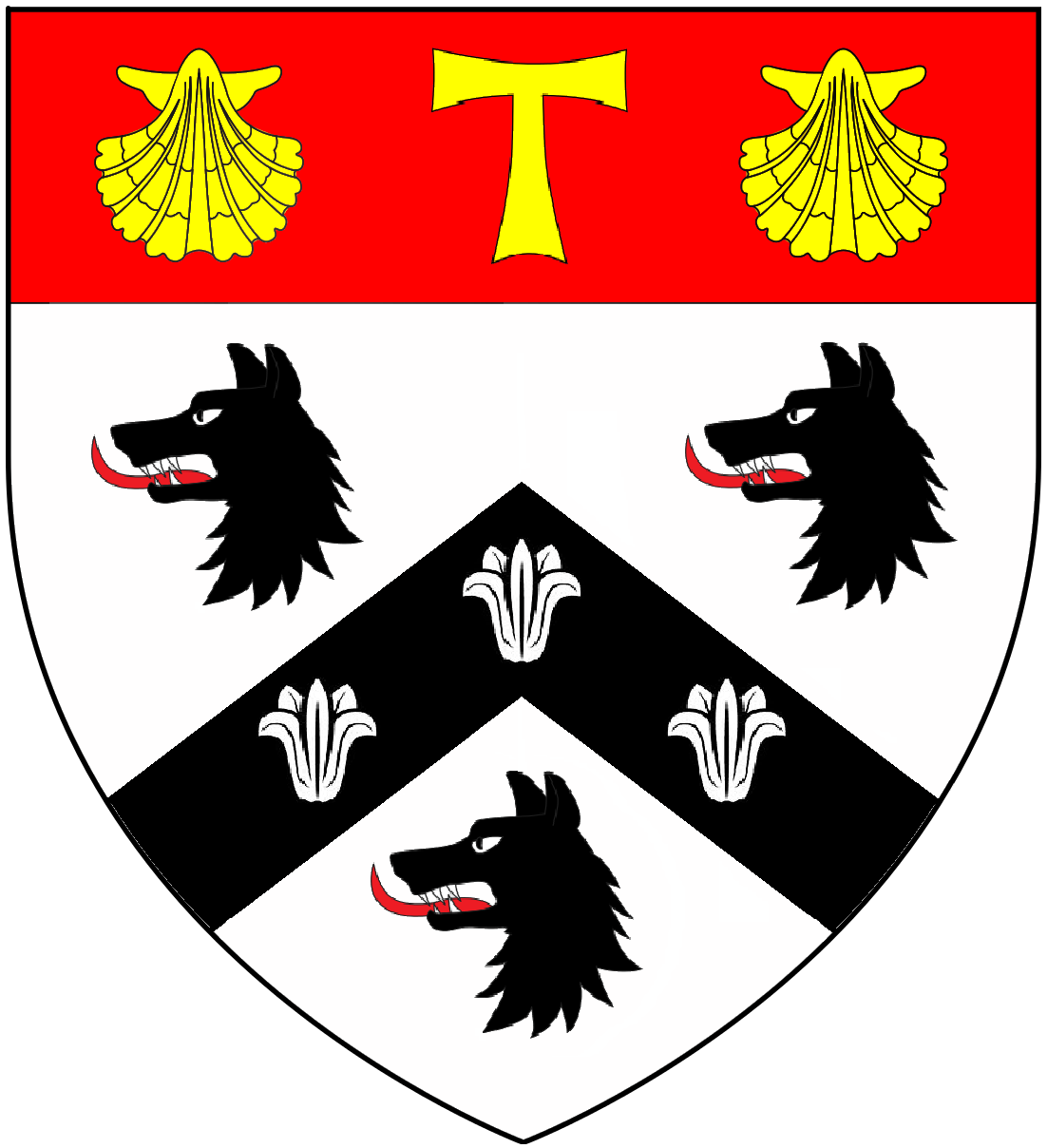
Arms of Roger Lupton: Argent, on a cheveron between three wolves' heads erased sable three lilies argent, on a chief gules a Tau cross between two escallops or

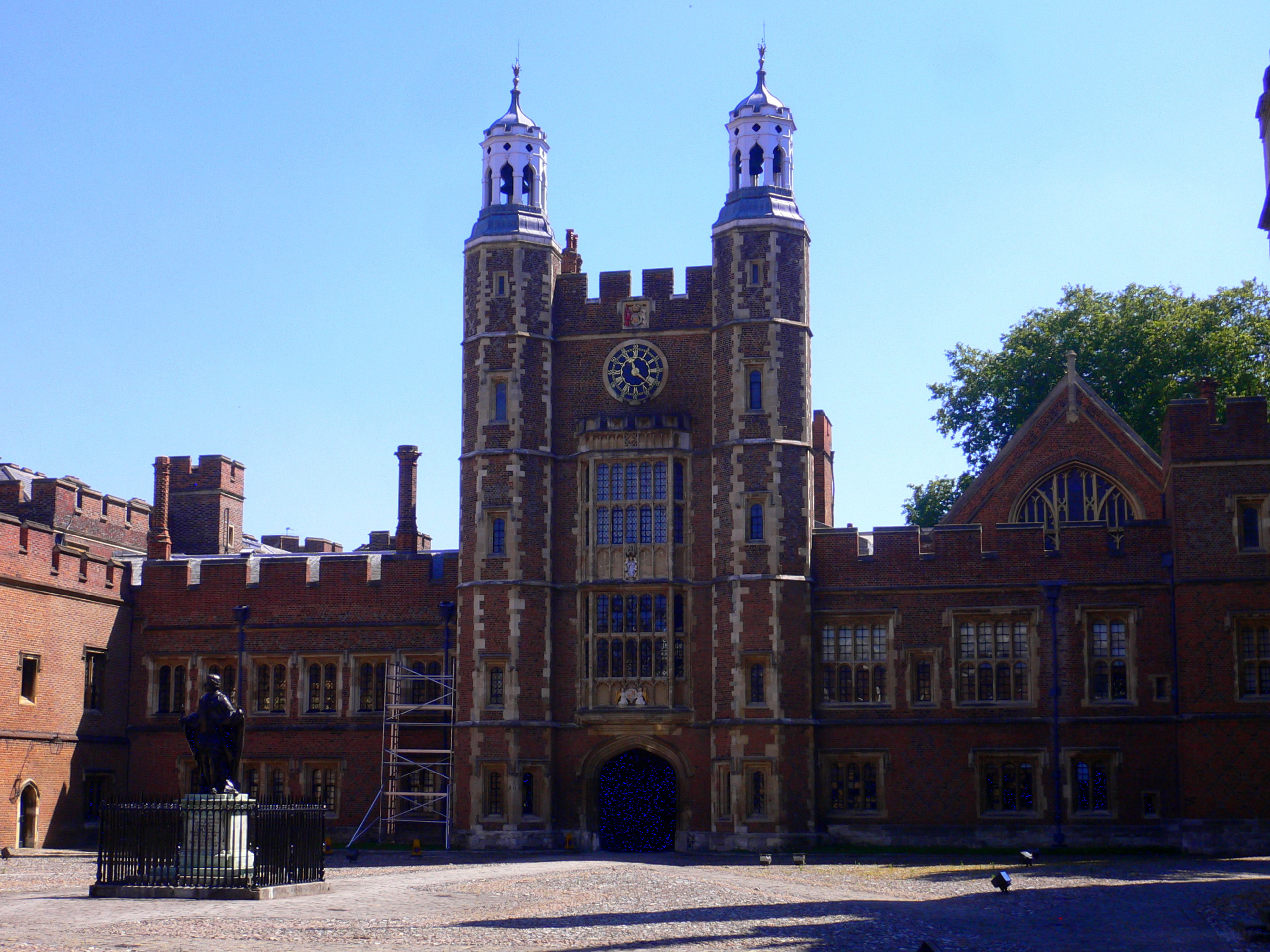
Lupton's Tower, Eton College, built 1514–20, together with Lupton's Chapel

Roger Lupton (1456–27 February 1539/40) was an English lawyer and cleric who served as chaplain to King Henry VII (1485–1509) and to his son King Henry VIII (1509–1547) and was appointed by the former as Provost of Eton College (1503/4–1535).

== Family origins ==
The Lupton family originated at the manor of Lupton, near Kirkby Lonsdale then in Westmorland, in present day Cumbria. The name was first recorded in the 15th century.

== Career ==
Lupton was born in 1456 in the parish of Sedbergh, at that time situated in Yorkshire, the son of Thomas Lupton of Sedbergh. He is first recorded at Cambridge University in 1479, where he was a member of King's College, a twin royal foundation with Eton College, in the governance and development of which latter he subsequently played a major role. He was admitted a Bachelor of Canon Law at Cambridge in 1484 and a Doctor of Canon Law in 1504.

In 1484, shortly after his graduation, Lupton served in the Court of Chancery, and was later appointed Rector of Harlton in Cambridgeshire. In 1500 he succeeded Oliver Dynham (1480–1500) as a Canon of Windsor, namely as the Canon of the 7th Stall, which office he held until his death. In February 1503/4 he was elected a Fellow and then Provost of Eton College, near Windsor, which post he retained until 1535. In 1509/10 he was occupying the post of Master of St. Anthony's Hospital, St Benet Fink in the City of London, but the exact date of his appointment is not known. In 1475 this Hospital, previously an independent foundation, had been annexed and appropriated to the College of St. George at Windsor Castle, and thus Lupton's appointment as Master was by the king.

== Founds Sedbergh School ==
In 1525, Dr Roger Lupton began to provide finance for the founding of Sedbergh School, a Chantry School in Sedbergh, the place of his birth. A few scholars were gathered together under a Chaplain, Henry Blomeyr. Lupton's intentions were twofold: "for the maintaining and increase of learning in Christ's Church", and "for his soul's health". An agreement was made so that the chaplain and scholars should have free seats in the chancel of Sedbergh Church. Sedbergh School continues to use Lupton's coat of arms as its emblem. In 1527, he established six scholarships to St John's College, Cambridge, to be awarded exclusively to boys from Sedbergh School with a preference for founder's kin - Lupton having had no children himself - and that they be sons of men with "lands truly purchased whose mansions were sufficienty built". A document held in the archives of St John's records that the scholars were:

"to be chosen from the grammar scole of Sedbare, wher the sayd Roger Lupton was borne and hath foundyd a perpetuall chauntry and the sayd grammar scole indued sufficiently with lyvelode and lands truly and suerly purchased and manciones sufficiently bylded".

As per the founder's kin clause, Lupton's relative, William Lupton (1732–1782), attended Sedbergh School and then St John's College, Cambridge before being assistant master at Leeds Grammar School and ordained to pursue a ministry in the Anglican church.

After land had been purchased and a school building constructed, almost certainly on the site of the present School Library, the foundation deed was signed, which bound the School to St John's College, Cambridge, which thenceforth had the power to appoint Headmasters. In 1535 two further scholarships to Cambridge were established by Lupton, with provision for two Fellowships also.

== Death and burial ==
He died on 27 February 1539/40 and was buried in Lupton's Chapel at Eton College, a side chapel (within the main College Chapel) which was commissioned by Lupton. His monumental brass survives at Eton, showing him dressed as a Canon of Windsor wearing a long robe with a cross. (Illustrated in Lack, Stuchfield and Whittemore, Monumental Brasses of Buckinghamshire, p. 86; brass rubbing at Ashmolean Museum, ref: "Buckinghamshire 2/106"). Lupton's Tower, a bell tower built during his time as Provost, is also named after him. His death is commemorated each year on 27 February at Eton on Threepenny Day which he founded.

== Lupton coat-of-arms ==
Lupton was chaplain to both Kings Henry VII (1485–1509) and his son Henry VIII (1509–1547) and was executor of Henry VII's will. King Henry VII granted Lupton a coat-of-arms. The arms were: Argent, on a cheveron between three wolves' heads erased sable three lilies argent, on a chief gules a Tau cross between two escallops or The Tau cross was a symbol of Saint Anthony of Egypt and thus probably referred to his mastership of St Anthony's Hospital. The wolves were canting references to his surname from the Latin Lupus, "a wolf", and Sable, three lilies argent, the same arrangement, is the base part of the arms of Eton College. The crest – a wolf's head erased - was borne by Lupton's collateral descendants. Sir John Burke described the coat-of-arms in 1844 as a "Wolf's head and neck erased sable" from the arms granted to the Lupton family's ancestor, Roger Lupton by Henry VII.

== See also ==
- Lupton family

Academic offices
Preceded by Henry Bost	Provost of Eton; 1504–1535	Succeeded by Roger Aldrich
