= Thomas Townend Dibb =

English lawyer (1807–1875)

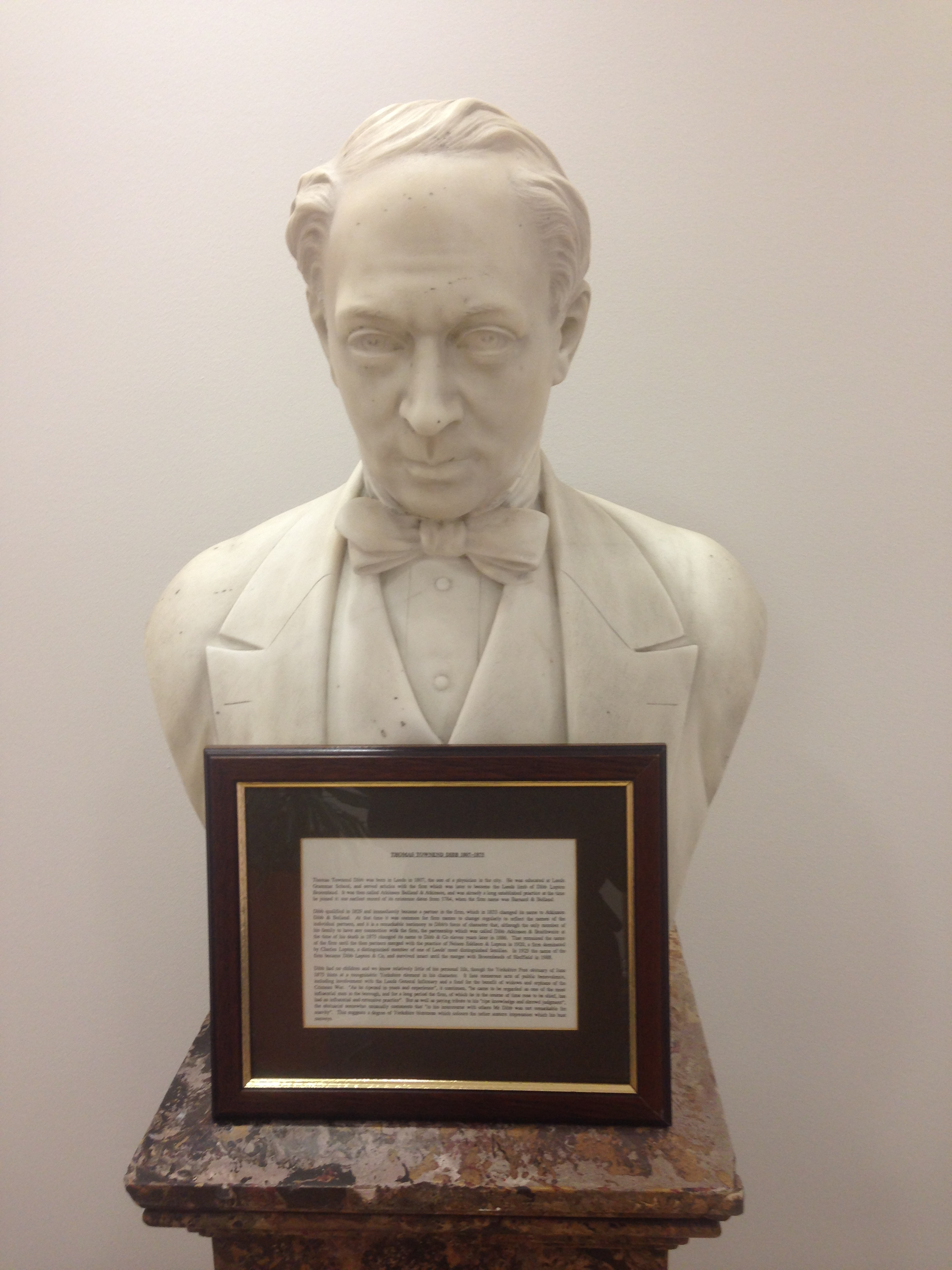

Thomas Townend Dibb was an English lawyer and one of the founders of DLA Piper.

== Early life ==
The son of a medical doctor, Dibb was born in Leeds in 1807. He was educated at Leeds Grammar School and qualified in law in 1829.

== Career ==
He then became a partner of Atkinson Bolland & Atkinson, a well established practice at that time and with record of its existence from 1764. Nearly a century later, the firm was known as Dibb, Lupton & Co.until 1988, when it merged with Broomheads of Sheffield. In 1996, linked with Alsop Wilkinson, the firm was known as Dibb, Lupton, Alsop and shortened to DLA around 2000. DLA became DLA Piper. A Victorian bust of its founder is displayed in the reception foyer of Leeds office.

== Personal life ==
Dibb married in 1835 Elizabeth Piper, daughter of John Piper. They had no children.

The Yorkshire Post obituary of June 1875 lists numerous acts of public benevolence, including involvement with the Leeds General Infirmary and a fund for the benefit of widows and orphans of the Crimean War. "As he ripened in years and experience" it continues, "he came to be regarded as one of the most influential in the borough and for a long period the firm, which he in the course of time rose to be chief, has had an influential and extensive practice". But as well as paying tribute to his "ripe knowledge and shrewd judgement", the obituarist somewhat unusually comments that "in his intercourse with others Mr Dibb was not remarkable for his suavity". This suggests a degree of Yorkshire bluntness which colours the rather austere impression which his bust conveys.
