= Lupton family =

English family

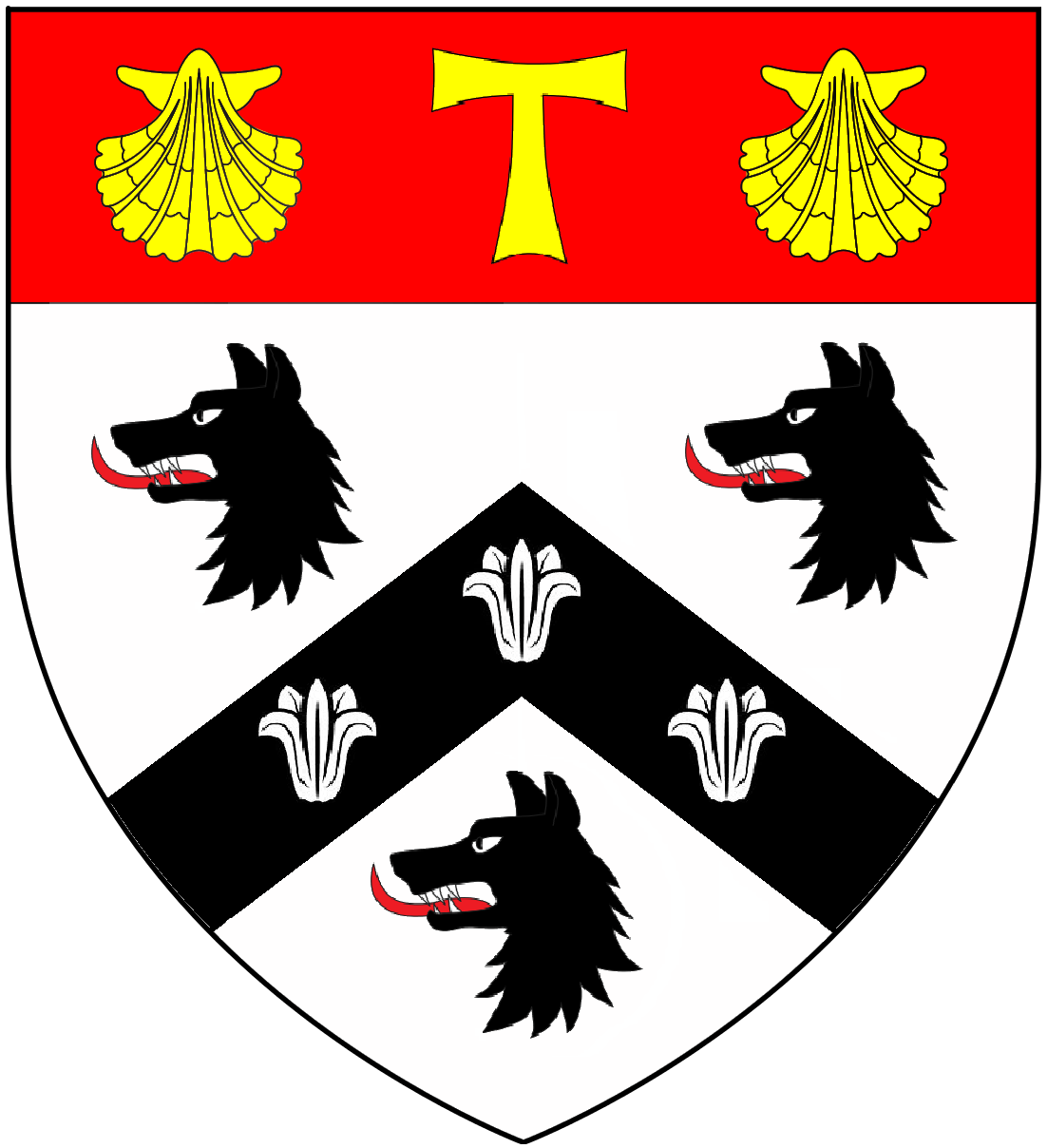
Arms of Dr. Roger Lupton (died 1540): "Argent, on a chevron sable between three wolf's heads and necks erased sable three lilies of the field on a chief gules a Tau cross between two escallops or". Arms granted by Henry VII.

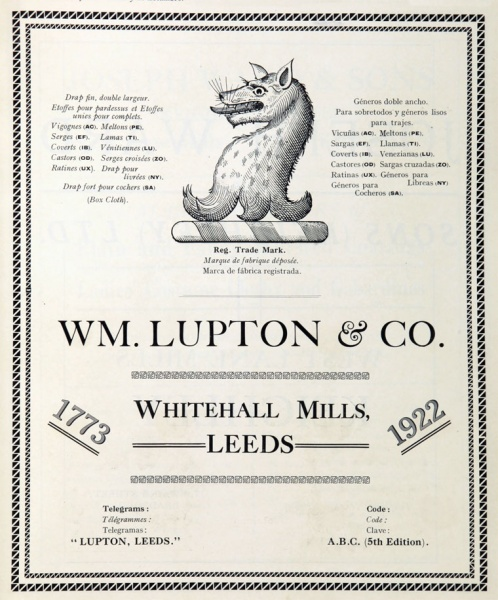
Lupton crest displayed in 1922, recorded by Sir Bernard Burke in 1844 as a "Wolf's head and neck erased sable" from the arms granted to ancestor Roger Lupton by Henry VII

The Lupton family in Yorkshire achieved prominence in ecclesiastical and academic circles in England in the Tudor era through the fame of Roger Lupton, provost of Eton College and chaplain to Henry VII and Henry VIII. By the Georgian era, the family was established as merchants and ministers in Leeds. Described in the city's archives as "landed gentry, a political and business dynasty", they had become successful woollen cloth merchants and manufacturers who flourished during the Industrial Revolution and traded throughout northern Europe, the Americas and Australia.

Members of the family contributed to the political life of the UK and the civic life of Leeds well into the 20th century. Several members were well acquainted with the British royal family and were philanthropists. Some were Lord Mayors of Leeds and M.P.s and progressive in their views. They were associated with the Church of England and the Unitarian church. The Lupton Residences of the University of Leeds are named after members of the family.

Catherine, Princess of Wales is a great-granddaughter of Olive Lupton who married Richard Noel Middleton in 1914.

== Luptons in Yorkshire ==
Lupton is a placename surname connected with Lupton in Cumbria (formerly Westmoreland). The surname in Yorkshire is recorded in 1297 in Subsidy Rolls (Robert Lupton), in the 1379 poll tax in Thornton in Lonsdale (Thomas de Lupton), in Pateley Bridge (Leonard Luptonn) in 1551 and (George Lupton) in 1553 and in 1599 in Keighley (Judithe Luptonne). Father Robert Lupton was the Vicar of Skipton in 1430.

=== Roger Lupton ===
For main article see Roger Lupton.

Roger Lupton, Provost and benefactor of Eton College, was born in Sedbergh, Yorkshire in 1456 and graduated from King's College, Cambridge in 1483. Although he does not appear to have been educated at Eton, a number of his Yorkshire relatives were Etonians, including Ralph Lupton, with whom he had much in common; both were natives of Sedbergh and studied at King's (Ralph was admitted to King's in 1506), and were later benefactors to the college. Another Yorkshire relative was Thomas Lupton of Nun Monkton, an Etonian, who was admitted to King's in 1517. Roger Lupton was a Doctor of canon law and a Canon of Windsor. He was chaplain to Henry VIII at the time of his coronation in April 1509. Lupton founded Sedbergh School as a chantry school while he was Provost of Eton. By 1528, land had been bought and the school built, probably on the site of the current Sedbergh School library, and the foundation deed was signed, binding Sedbergh to St John's College, Cambridge, at which Lupton had established a number of fellowships and scholarships. He was Provost of Eton College for 30 years, and the prominent tower in the school yard is named after him. He died in 1540 and was buried in Lupton's Chapel – his chantry at Eton.

== Luptons of Leeds ==
=== Sixteenth century ===
The earliest recorded member of the Leeds branch of the family is Thomas Lupton of Holbeck whose children included a daughter, Margaret (born 1599) and a son, Thomas (born 1628) who was a scholar at Leeds Grammar School and admitted as a sizar to St John's College, Cambridge in 1648. He became a minister.

==== Clergy, farmers, clothiers and merchants ====
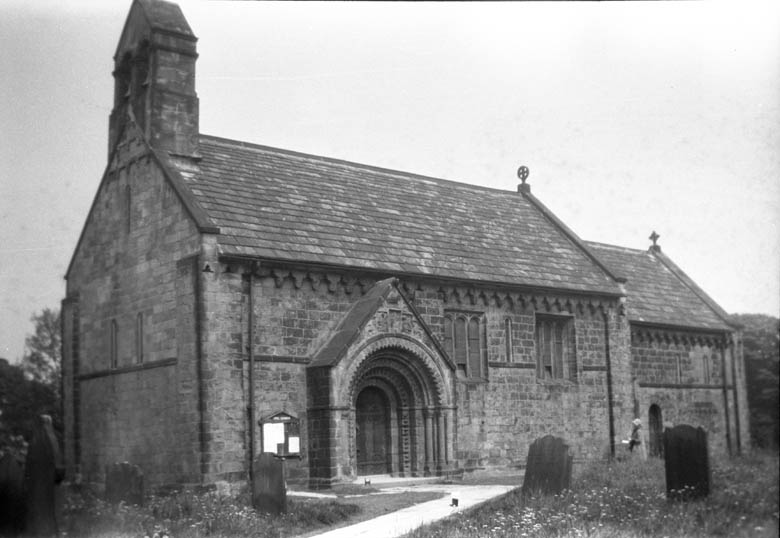
Francis and Esther Lupton married at Adel Church in 1688.

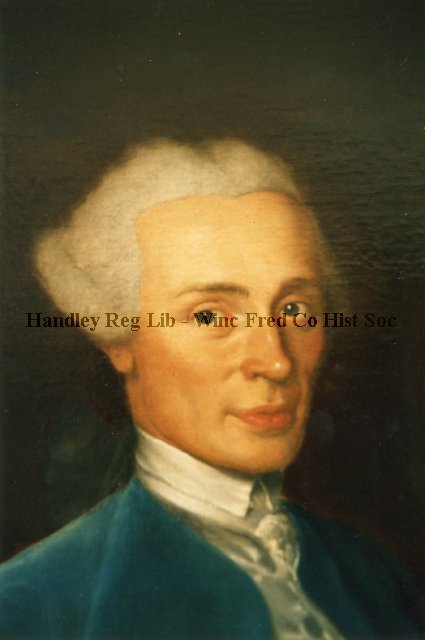
Francis Lupton II (1731–1770), c. 1760s

Francis Lupton (1658–1717) married Esther Midgeley of Breary, daughter of Ralph, a yeoman farmer. They married at Adel Church, near Leeds in 1688. Francis Lupton was appointed clerk at Leeds Parish Church on 31 August 1694. They had nine children. Their son William I (1700–1771), a yeoman farmer and clothier with business connections in the Netherlands and Germany, lived in Whitkirk, Leeds. He was Sir Henry Ibbetson's chief cloth-dresser. Master dressers were skilled artisans who finished the cloth and were the highest paid in the cloth industry. Appointed the sole executor of Ibbetson's partner John Koster, Lupton managed the company for Ibbetson during his last illness. His three sons attended Leeds Grammar School. The eldest, Francis II (1731–1770), was sent to Lisbon to trade in English cloth and was caught up in the 1755 Lisbon earthquake. He was described as "an eminent merchant at that place". Charterhouse School registers record the marriage of Sarah, the only daughter of Francis Lupton of Lisbon in 1788.

William's second son, William II (1732–1782) boarded at Sedbergh School and attended St John's College, Cambridge. He became an assistant master at Leeds Grammar School and was ordained to pursue a ministry in the church at Headingley, near Leeds. His son, the Rev John Lupton (died 1844), held an M.A. from Trinity College, Cambridge. Arthur I (1748–1807), William's third son, was sent to Leopold Pfeil's school in Frankfurt when he was 15, to study High Dutch and French. In 1764, Wolfgang von Goethe, his contemporary at the school, wrote about his schoolmate.

Arthur Lupton returned to England in 1766 before leaving for Lisbon. In 1768, he took on two partners and was joined by John Luccock, with whom he set up a subsidiary company, Lupton & Luccock, in Rio de Janeiro. William Lupton and Company was established in 1773, but traded in cloth before this date. Lupton sat on the committee for the Leeds cloth halls, regulating their activities. In 1774 the leading merchants organised the construction of the 3rd White Cloth Hall. A trade directory of 1790 lists Lupton & Company as Merchants in the Leylands.

Arthur Lupton married Olive Rider, the only daughter of David Rider in 1773. She brought a £5,000 dowry to the marriage. Her father had substantial land holdings in Mabgate and the Leylands between North Street and Wade Lane. Lupton and his wife inherited a life interest in the land after Rider's death, after which the land passed to their sons, William and Arthur.

=== Next generation ===
Rider's grandson William Lupton (1777–1828) inherited 5/8ths of the estate, and his brother Arthur, 3/8ths. They held the estate as tenants in common, but in 1811 divided the property. William took "Town End" which included his father's dressing mill built in 1788, warehouses, the tenter garth stretching to Wade Lane and a substantial house. Its insured assets included a warehouse, counting house, packing shop, machinery and tools for dressing cloth, a hot pressing shop and a steam engine. The property consisted of a woollen mill and reservoir, a substantial house and outbuildings. William, who married Ann, the daughter of tobacconist John Darnton, shared responsibility for the business with his brother, Arthur II (1782–1824).

Trade was unpredictable; losses were made in 1806 but 1809 showed a recovery. In 1819, William formed a partnership with his nephew David Rider; but Rider's share of £1,000 made him very much the junior as Lupton's share was in excess of £38,000. William Lupton became entangled with the estate of his wife's grandfather, Nathan Rider. Winding up Rider's assets while providing an income for his widow and children ultimately took 15 years. John Luccock, their cousin, sought to expand the business in New Orleans in 1822, but was forced to give up a year later. The company's South American trade opened up again, albeit with difficulties in Peru. During the 1820s the business made little profit and Arthur Lupton, the "travelling" partner, reportedly shot himself while suffering from a fever in Paris in 1824. He left a wife, also named Ann, to bring up four children alone. William Lupton died in 1828 leaving a wife, ten children and extensive debts. He owed Becketts Bank more than £13,000 and more than £15,000 to his father-in-law. The Lupton widows maintained their social status and living standards with their own personal estates and by developing their inherited urban landholdings.

William's widow Ann, a woman of "considerable initiative and skill", maintained the family business with her sons Darnton, Francis and Arthur. The sole executrix of her husband's will, she set about developing the land. She laid out Merrion Street in Leeds with plots for terraced houses and Belgrave Street with larger plots and a garden square. She retired to Gledhow Mount in the proto suburb of Potternewton in 1858 where she died aged 81 in 1865. In 1897, Merrion Street Mill was replaced by the Grand Arcade, developed by the Lupton family under the auspices of the New Briggate Arcade Co Ltd. In 1901, another shopping parade called "Roswells" was built on North Street (demolished for construction of inner ring road in 1967).

==== Religion, politics and philanthropy ====
Originally Anglicans, by the early 19th century the Luptons were Dissenters, part of a close group of established merchant families who belonged to the Unitarian congregation of Mill Hill Chapel which included the Luptons, Oates, Bischoff and Stansfield families who were subsequently joined by new money, the Marshalls, the Kitsons and radicals such as Samuel Smiles. Their denominational loyalty was mirrored by their political leanings; mostly, they were Whigs and later Liberals. They supported the New Subscription Library, set up in the early 19th century, with a "mildly whiggish character" as a counter to the Anglican, Tory tone of the Leeds Library. and members of the family subscribed to the building fund of the Leeds Philosophical and Literary Society, a learned society founded in 1819, which established Leeds City Museum.

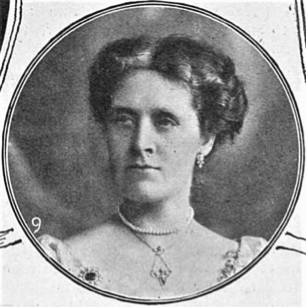
Mrs Arnold Lupton in 1909 when President of the Sleaford Women's’ Liberal Association

Arthur Lupton II (1782–1824) was the father of Unitarian minister Arthur Lupton (1819–1867) whose son, Arnold Lupton, was Liberal MP for Sleaford from 1906 to 1910. Arnold Lupton's wife, Jessie (1859–1938) was involved in political life and active in the Leeds branch of the National Anti-Vivisection Society. She was presented at Court in 1906.

Joseph Lupton was President of Manchester New College, London (now Harris Manchester College, Oxford) from 1881 to 1886.

=== William's descendants ===
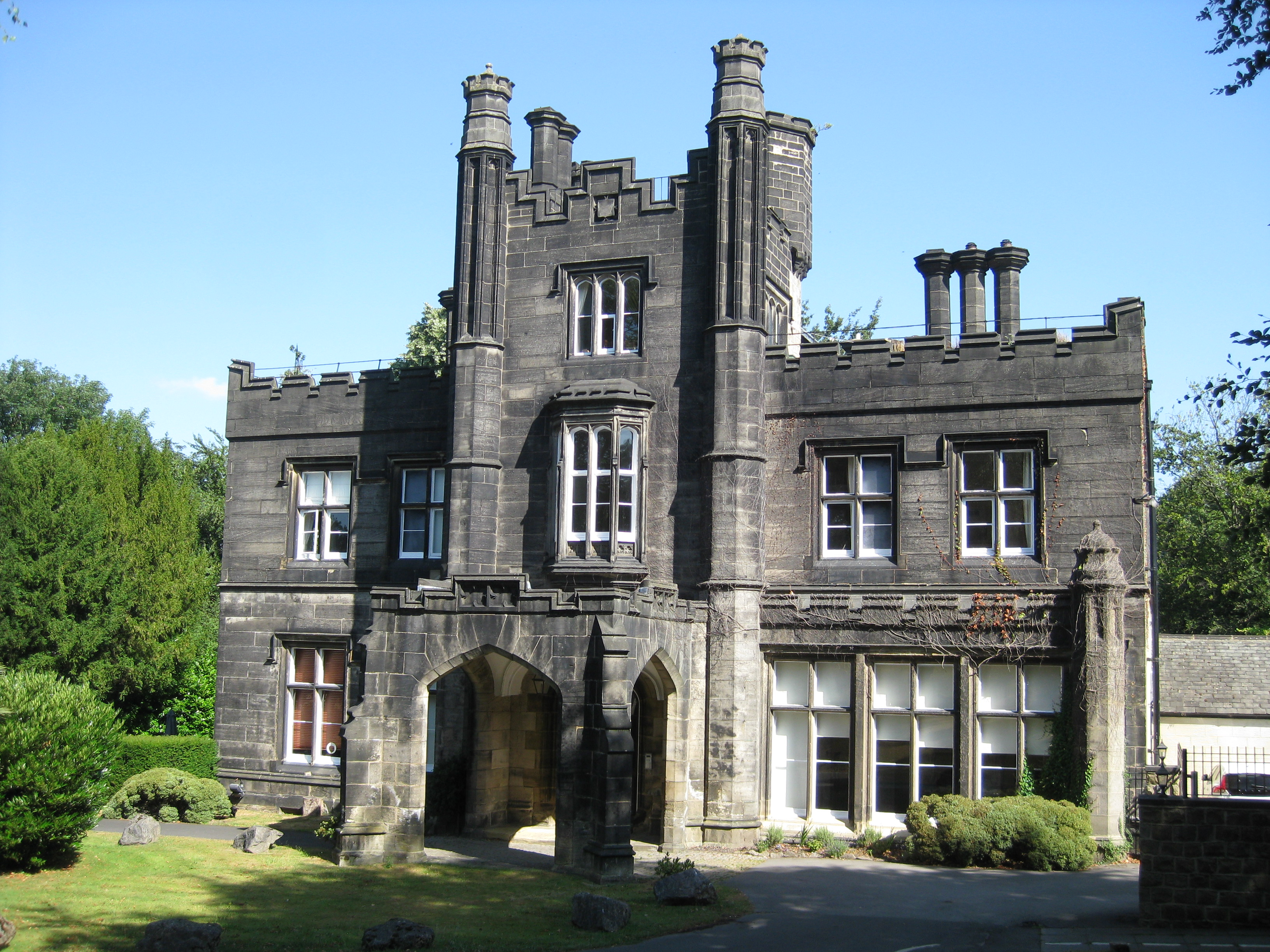
Headingley Castle, Arthur Lupton's home from 1866

==== Arthur Lupton ====
William III's children included Arthur (1809–1889) who moved to Newton Hall in Potternewton which he owned from the early 1840s. He subdivided some of the estate and Newton Grove was built in the 1850s. He married Jane Crawford on 25 April 1866 and moved to The Elms, which was given its original name, Headingley Castle.

==== Darnton Lupton ====
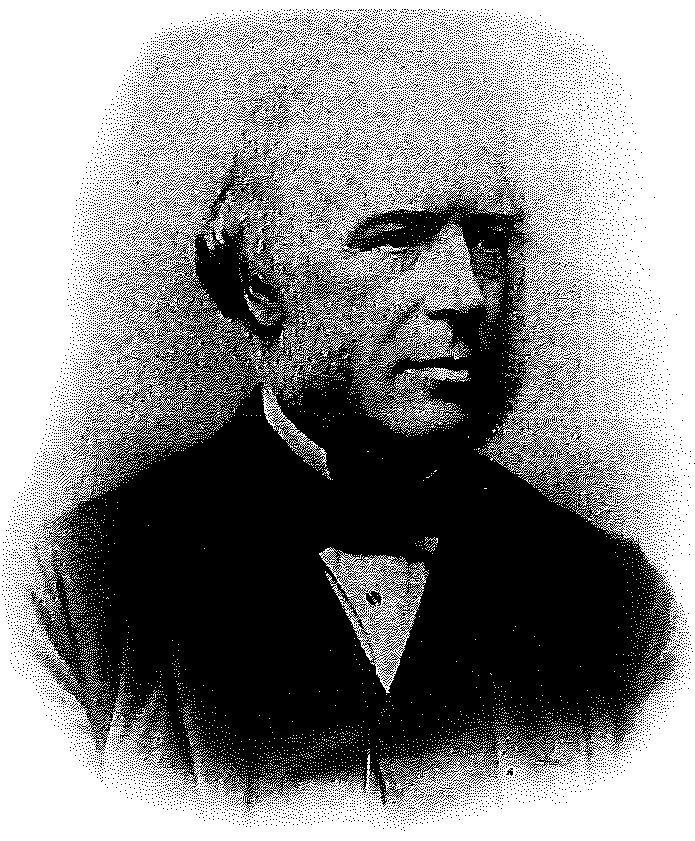
Darnton Lupton, Knight of the Legion of Honour and Mayor of Leeds

Darnton Lupton (1806–1873) lived at Potternewton Hall from the 1830s. He was the Mayor of Leeds in 1844 and a magistrate. He was a director of the Bank of Leeds. Darnton Lupton supported building Leeds Town Hall and as vice president of the Leeds Chamber of Commerce, presided over the Exhibition of Local Industry arranged in conjunction with its opening. He was a member of the welcoming party that greeted Queen Victoria and Prince Albert who opened the town hall on 7 September 1858. He was created a Chevalier of the Legion of Honour by Napoleon III for the Exhibit of Cloths in the Paris Exhibition of 1855. Darnton and Francis Lupton became co-owners of the Newton Hall estate when their brother sold it in 1870.

He married his first cousin, Sarah Darnton Luccock (1806–1834), daughter of John Luccock, who died shortly after the birth in 1833 of Kate, their only child. He then married Anna Jane Busk (1813–1888), granddaughter of Sir Wadsworth Busk at St Peter's Church, Bradford in 1838. Anna Lupton joined her cousin Lord Houghton and sister-in-law Frances Lupton in support of the North of England Council for Promoting the Higher Education of Women.

==== Francis Lupton III ====
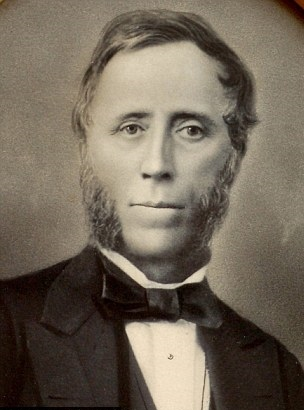
Francis Lupton III, landowner

Francis III (1813–1884) was educated at Leeds Grammar School. He was 15 when his father died, but had already acquired an extensive knowledge of the cloth trade. He joined the board of the Bank of Leeds, became a magistrate of the West Riding of Yorkshire and overseer of the poor in the parish of Roundhay. He was chairman of the finance committee of the Yorkshire College of Science, created in 1874.

In 1847 he married Frances Greenhow, niece of writers and reformers Harriet and James Martineau. A lifelong Unitarian, she was the honorary secretary and "driving force" behind the Yorkshire Ladies Council of Education from 1871 to 1885 and the Leeds representative of the Ladies' Educational Association for the North of England Council for Promoting the Higher Education of Women. In 1875 she chaired a meeting of both organisations to form the committee that raised funds to start Leeds Girls' High School. She was the school council's vice-president until 1891. Frances belonged to the Education for Girls Committee of the Royal Society of Arts.

Francis and Frances Lupton lived at Potternewton Hall from 1847, acquiring the freehold in 1860. It was where their children were born. By 1870, Francis and his brother Darnton had acquired the adjacent Newton Hall estate from their brother Arthur. They developed the land to create the Newton Park Estate. By 1860, Francis and Frances had moved to Beechwood, a Georgian mansion and farm in Roundhay. Their sons, Frank, Arthur, Charles, and Hugh held some of Leeds' most important public offices. Arthur married Harriet Ashton and Charles married her sister Katharine whose brother was Thomas Ashton, 1st Baron Ashton of Hyde.

The 1891 United Kingdom census records that the widow Frances Lupton lived at Beechwood with a staff of servants, including a lady's maid, gardeners, coachmen, grooms and a farm bailiff who lived in cottages on the estate. Following the death of Frances in 1892, Her eldest son Francis's fellow Liberal politician Rowland Barran, son of Sir John Barran lived in Beechwood until WW1.

==== Joseph Lupton ====
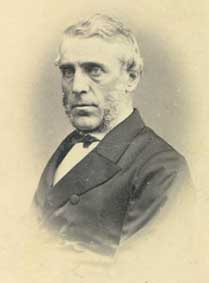
Joseph Lupton, abolitionist

William III's son Joseph (1816–1894), a committed Liberal was on the executive of the National Reform Union. He was the president of the British and Foreign Unitarian Association in 1876–77, president from 1881 until 1886 and later vice-president of Manchester New College, the training college for ministers, during the 1880s and 1890s, helping to plan and finance its move from London to Oxford.

Lupton was a passionate anti-slavery campaigner, joining with the minister of Mill Hill Chapel, Charles Wicksteed and his cousin Harriet Lupton, in being admirers of the campaigner William Lloyd Garrison, an advocate of immediate abolition. Garrison was a guest at his home in July 1877. He supported the campaign for votes for women, sitting on the committee for the National Society for Women's Suffrage. He was the senior partner of firm Luccock, Lupton & Co., merchants, of Bradford.

Joseph married Eliza Buckton (1818–1901) in 1842. Their son, Henry (1850–1932), of Lyndhurst, North Grange Road, Headingley a cloth merchant, married Clara Taylor (1860–1897). They had five surviving children. Their eldest daughter Violet Dorothy (1884–1935) married Hugh Steele Bompas.

John Lupton (1822–1892) of Moorlands, Headingley, married Mary Buckton (1828–1914) in 1858. Their son Edgar (1867–1957) attended Fettes College and became a cloth merchant, becoming President of the Leeds Chamber of Commerce in 1921.

Elizabeth Lupton (1819–1882) married Joshua Buckton (1819–1895) in 1861. This was the third marriage between Buckton and Lupton siblings.

==== Alan Lupton ====
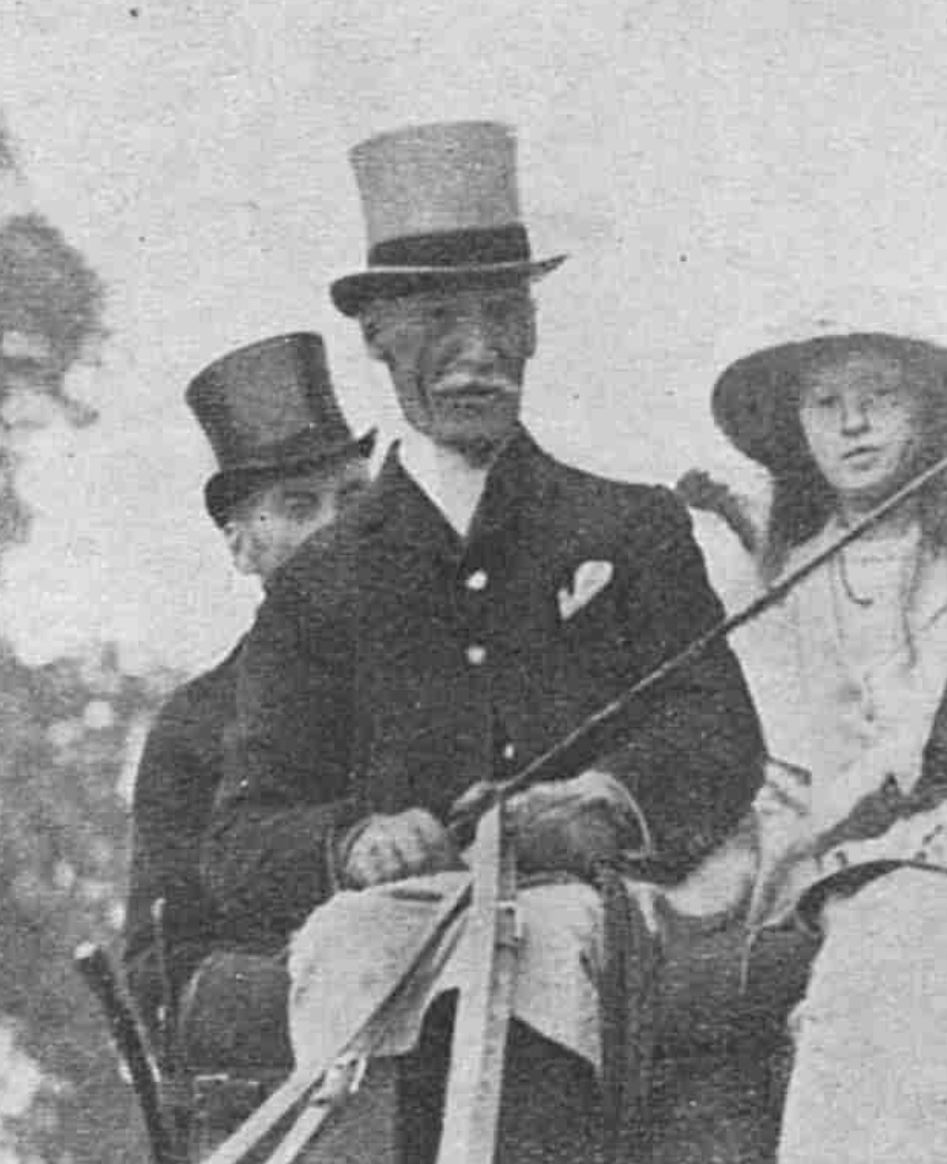
Alan Lupton seen carriage driving

Darnton's son Alan (1846–1918) grew up at Potternewton Hall. He married Emma Buckton (1849–1938) in 1872 in Leeds. He was a Justice of the Peace, woollen manufacturer and Chairman of Messrs H.R. Baines & Co, proprietors of the Daily Graphic, The Graphic and Bystander magazine. He enjoyed carriage driving. During the Boer War and the First World War, he supplied horses to the Commonwealth Shipping Committee and other goods for the war effort. He died at his home, Highfield, in Ripon. His only son was Alan Cecil Lupton.

==== Kate Lupton (Baroness von Schunck) ====
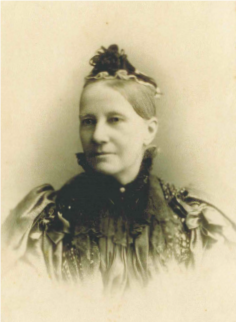
Kate Lupton

Darnton's only daughter, Kate (1833–1913) grew up at Potternewton Hall. She married Edward, Baron von Schunck in 1867 and they lived at Gledhow Wood. She was a wealthy woman with an interest in the Yorkshire Ladies Council of Education. An original member of the council, in 1908, she was on its management committee. She was a member of the committee that established Leeds Girls' High School. She volunteered at the Leeds Ladies' Association for the Care and Protection of Friendless Girls. She supported Mill Hill Chapel, Leeds Infirmary and the University of Leeds.

Her daughter, Florence Schunck married Albert Kitson who, in 1911, inherited his father's title and Gledhow Hall. During the First World War Gledhow Hall was used as a VAD hospital where Kate's granddaughter Doris Kitson was a VAD nurse. Her son John Edward Schunk (1869–1940) renounced his title before the First World War. His son was composer Christian Darnton. Kate Schunck was invited to the coronation of King George V in 1911. She died at Gledhow Wood aged 80 on 16 May 1913.

==== Francis Martineau Lupton ====
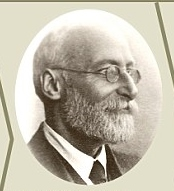
Frank Lupton

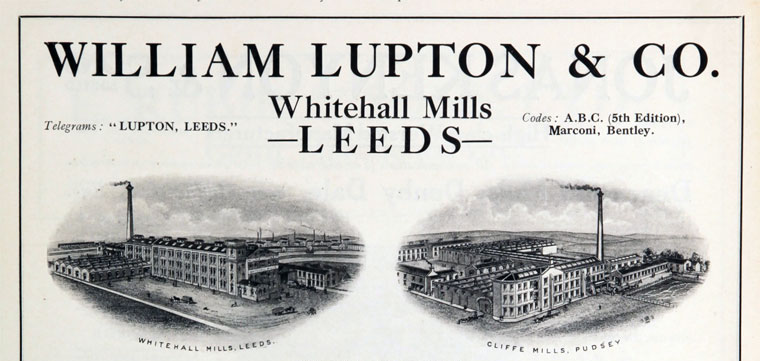
In 1921, Frank Lupton owned William Lupton and Co established in 1773.

Francis Martineau Lupton (1848–1921), known as Frank, was Francis III's eldest son. He attended Leeds Grammar School and Trinity College, Cambridge where he read history before entering the family business. From 1870 to 1880, he was a member of the Leeds Rifles. From the 1880s, Wm. Lupton & Co moved from being merchants to manufacturing in response to the restructuring of the economics of cloth making. The company acquired other mills and power looms in Pudsey and converted the mills to be driven by electricity. They took advantage of new sources of wool from the Americas and Australia. The textile mills were on Whitehall Road, Leeds.

In 1880, Frank Lupton married Harriet Albina Davis (1850–1892), daughter of clergyman Thomas Davis. She died in 1892, two weeks after the birth of their youngest son. They had two daughters and three sons. Frank Lupton and his family lived at Rockland on the Newton Park Estate much of which, on the death of his mother in 1892, he inherited with his brothers.

Frank Lupton devoted his life to the business and civic work. He was a Justice of the Peace for Leeds and the West Riding. A Liberal, he broke from Gladstone over Home Rule and became a Liberal Unionist. In 1895 he became an alderman on Leeds City Council. He was an alderman until 1916.

Frank Lupton was interested in the welfare of the poor and, impressed by social reformer Octavia Hill, worked to improve poor working class housing. He was Director of Leeds Industrial Dwellings Company Limited. From 1896, for ten years, he chaired the council's Unhealthy Areas Committee addressing the legacy of slum housing. Led by Lupton, the committee cleared the York Street and Quarry Hill areas of almost 4,000 buildings and organised new housing. He opposed proposals to build tenements for rehousing triggering his resignation as chairman. Later he chaired the council's Improvement and Finance Committees. Halfway through this period, he wrote the book, Housing Improvement: A Summary of Ten Years' Work in Leeds (1906). He was an active member of the West Riding bench and took great interest in Cookridge Hospital. During the Great War he served on the Pensions Committee. As a Unitarian, he took a share of the work and activities of Mill Hill Chapel.

Lupton and his brothers inspected the Leeds Pals at a camp near Colsterdale in 1915. His three sons boarded at Rugby School after which they attended Trinity College, Cambridge. All three died in the Great War. Captain Maurice Lupton was killed in action by a sniper bullet in the trenches at Lille on 19 June 1915. Lieutenant Lionel Martineau Lupton was wounded, mentioned in dispatches twice and, after recovering, was killed in the Battle of the Somme in July 1916. Major Francis Ashford Lupton was reported missing at Miraumont on the night of 19 February 1917 when he went out with one man on reconnaissance and was later found dead. After their deaths, Lupton turned his family home, Rockland, into an institution for the children of sailors and soldiers, and moved with his daughters to Roundhay. In April 1917, King George V commanded that a letter be written to Lupton in which the King recognised the exceptional loss of "your gallant" sons.

A generous benefactor, Frank Lupton contributed to many causes and institutions, including the extension fund for Norwich's Octagon Chapel, of which his great-grandfather, Thomas Martineau, had been deacon and in 1907 to the rebuilding of Martineau Hall, the Sunday school established by his great uncle James Martineau.

==== Arthur G. Lupton and his daughters: Lady Mayoress Elinor Lupton and Elizabeth Lupton ====
Arthur Greenhow Lupton (1850–1930) was Francis III's second son. Educated at Leeds Grammar School, he entered the family business at the age of 16. He was elected to the board of governors of the Yorkshire College at 25 and, after his father's death, took over as chairperson of its Finance Committee. At 36, he was elected to the city council and in 1889 became its chairperson. He negotiated the separation of the Yorkshire College from the Victoria University. Leeds University received its royal charter in 1904, naming "Our trusty and well-beloved Arthur Greenhow Lupton, chairperson of the Council of the Yorkshire College" as its first Pro Chancellor. He hosted George V when he visited the university on 27 September 1915. He held the post for 16 years, then returned to the council, promoting co-operation between the university and industry, especially the Clothworkers Company.

Recognising the need for large-scale electricity generation, he founded the Yorkshire Electric Power Company and Electrical Distribution of Yorkshire Ltd, and was its chairperson until nationalisation. He promoted the House to House Electricity Company, which was taken over by Leeds Corporation. With friends, he started the Wetherby District Water Company, was concerned with the Yorkshire Waste Heat Company, was a director of the North Eastern Railway and a West Riding magistrate. During the Great War, he established a shell filling factory at Barnbow. In 1921, on the death of his brother, Frank, he took over responsibility for Wm. Lupton & Co.

Arthur married Harriet Ashton, daughter of Thomas Ashton, with whom he had two daughters: Elinor Gertrude (1886–1979) and Elizabeth (Bessie, 1888–1977). His wife died shortly after giving birth to Bessie. Their second cousin, Beatrix Potter, sent them her own hand-drawn watercolour Christmas cards; examples from 1890 to 1895 have survived. His elder son Thomas Lupton (1884–1896) was sent to Lockers Park School in Hertfordshire, where there was an outbreak of scarlet fever in March 1896. In 1908, Elinor Lupton was awarded an M.A. from Newnham College, Cambridge before returning to Leeds. There, she began her long association with LGHS, when she joined the governing body and served in various positions from 1915 until she retired in 1969. In 1939, when the school's finances were in a critical condition, she guaranteed a bank overdraft; in 1945, she donated £12,000 to establish a trust fund, laying the foundation for GSAL's bursary fund today. Both sisters served as V.A.D. nurses in France during the Great War. Their brother, Major Arthur Michael Lupton (1885–1929) survived the war. In 1919, he married his first cousin Francis Ashford Lupton's widow Dorothy. They had a son, Thomas Michael (Tom, 1920–2008). A riding accident with the Bramham Moor Hunt in 1928 resulted in Arthur Michael Lupton's death the following year. Tom was educated at Shrewsbury School and Trinity College, Cambridge. He was co-founder of LM Furniture (Lupton Morton), a visionary manufacturer of flat-pack modern furniture in the 1950s and 60s. He began studies at the Architectural Association in London after the Second World War and it was here that he met John Morton MBE (1919–2017). In 1969 the company was acquired by Ryman Conran; the brief partnership of Ryman stationery and Terence Conran and the Campus range was on sale at Habitat until the late 70s. He married Ruth Ellen Cropper, daughter of James Winstanley Cropper, of James Cropper plc.

Lupton Elinor Lupton was awarded an honorary LLD for services to Leeds University in 1945 after chairing the Women's Halls Committee for 23 years. The Lupton Residences were named after her and her father. Her father, in 1910, and her uncle Charles Lupton, in 1919, were both granted honorary doctorates. Elinor was a J.P. and in 1942–3, was the Lady Mayoress for Leeds' first female Lord Mayor, Jessie Beatrice Kitson. The women hosted visits from royalty, including the Princess Royal, her husband Lord Harewood, the Duchess of Kent and Lady Mountbatten. Elinor and Bessie volunteered with the Leeds Auxiliary Fire Service (AFS) during the war. In 1951 the Lupton sisters donated land to expand the campus of Leeds University. They were members of The University of Leeds Ladies' Club; holding meetings at their home, Beechwood, and were entertained at Harewood House in 1954 at the invitation of the Princess Royal, the club's patron. The sisters ran a rare-breed goat farm at Beechwood.

In the 1970s, the sisters placed a non-build covenant in the ownership deeds to preserve open grassland on Asket Hill, part of the family's Beechwood estate. After Elinor's death, Leeds Girls' High School acquired a Grade II listed former church and renamed it the Elinor Lupton Centre.

==== Sir Charles Lupton ====
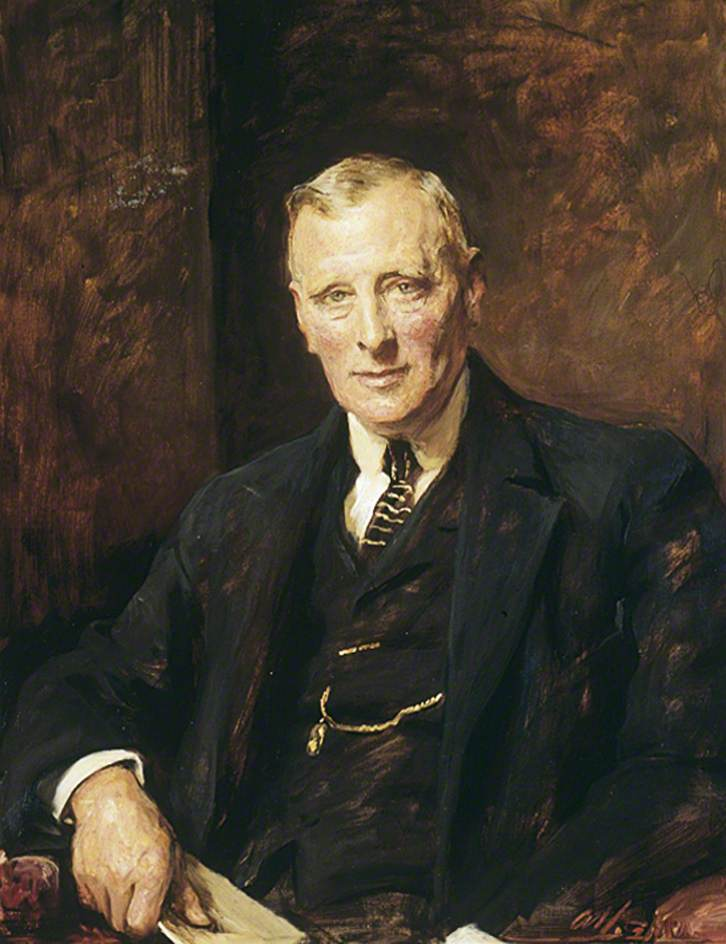
Lord Mayor of Leeds, Sir Charles Lupton, by Sir Arthur Stockdale Cope

Charles Lupton OBE (1855–1935), Francis III's fourth son was educated at Leeds Grammar School, Rugby School and Trinity College, Cambridge where he read history. He qualified as a solicitor in 1881 practising mainly at Dibb & Co, which became Dibb Lupton. In 1888 he married his brother's sister in law, Katharine Ashton who was one of the founders of the Leeds Ladies Luncheon Club in 1923. He was elected to the board of management of Leeds General Infirmary and in 1900 was treasurer and chairman of the board as it evolved into a modern hospital. By 1921, he had retired but remained on the board. He played host to Princess Mary when she visited the Infirmary in October 1922. He was First Vice-president of Yorkshire Cancer Research from 1925 to his death. He was a member of the Court and Council of the university and chairman of the Law Committee. His daughter, Frances Grace Lupton (1893–1937) attended Prior's Field School and Somerville College, Oxford and was training as a solicitor in 1918 before being awarded an MA in 1920. His only surviving son Captain Charles Roger Lupton was killed in action in 1918.

In 1915–1916, while Lord Mayor of Leeds, Lupton raised money to enlarge the military hospital at Chapel Allerton. He inspected troops with his brothers in Colsterdale in the Yorkshire Dales in support of the Leeds Pals battalion.

A Liberal, he became a Liberal-Unionist at the time of the First Home Rule Bill. In 1918 he was Deputy-Lieutenant for the West Riding of Yorkshire. He was granted the Freedom of the City in 1926. He was the city council's Chairman of the Improvements Committee and promoted the construction of Leeds Outer Ring Road in the post-war years and the widening of the Upper and Lower Headrows. He lived at Carr Head in Roundhay and left his art collection to the City of Leeds in 1935.

==== Hugh Lupton ====
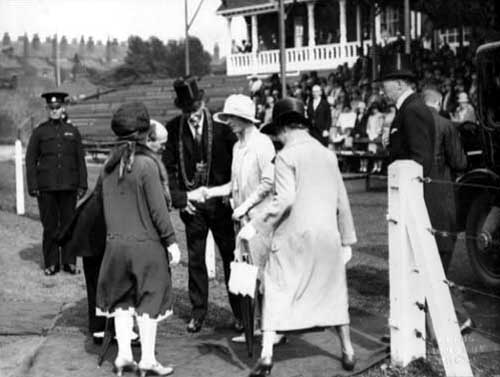
1927, Lord Mayor Hugh Lupton beside Princess Mary, in white hat. Lady Mayoress Isabella Lupton is in white coat facing back to camera

Hugh Lupton (1861–1947), Francis III's fifth son attended Rugby School before University College, Oxford, reading modern history. He was apprenticed to Hathorn Davey, makers of heavy pumping machinery, in 1881 and rose to be managing director only to see the company taken over by Sulzer in the Great Depression. He was a member of the Institute of Mechanical Engineers. He was Director of Ruo Estates, Limited. He sat on the Roundhay and Seacroft Rural District Council and, for a year, was chair. When the RDC became a ward of the city in 1913, he was elected to Leeds City Council, serving for many years. During most of this time he was Chair of the Electricity Committee. In 1926, he was Lord Mayor of Leeds, with his wife Isabella as Lady Mayoress. In these roles, they hosted visits by the Princess Royal and her husband Lord Harewood. In June 1927, Isabella Lupton was presented at Court by the Countess of Harewood, Princess Mary's mother-in-law. On 23 August 1933 Hugh Lupton was presented to King George V and Queen Mary at Leeds Town Hall.

Hugh Lupton's sons survived the Great War; surgeon Charles Athelstane (1897–1977), studied at Wellington College and Trinity College, Cambridge and wrote a book, "The Lupton Family in Leeds". Athelstane's daughter Christine (1937 ー2019) married Hugh David Childers, grandson of Erskine Childers and The fourth President of Ireland (1973–74) Erskine Hamilton Childers was his uncle. Hugh Ralph Lupton OBE (1893–1983), was also educated at Wellington College and Trinity College, Cambridge. He married Joyce, sister of the author Arthur Ransome. Their son Arthur Ralph Ransome Lupton (1924–2009) was educated at Rugby and Cambridge. His brother Francis G. H. Lupton OBE (1921–2006) was educated at Radley College and Trinity College, Cambridge and a third brother, Geoffrey Charles Martineau Lupton (1930–2019) was educated at Rugby and Merton College, Oxford. He married Colina, daughter of Sir Raibeart MacDougall. Hugh's family includes performer Hugh Lupton and author Rosamund Lupton.

==== Olive Middleton (née Lupton) ====
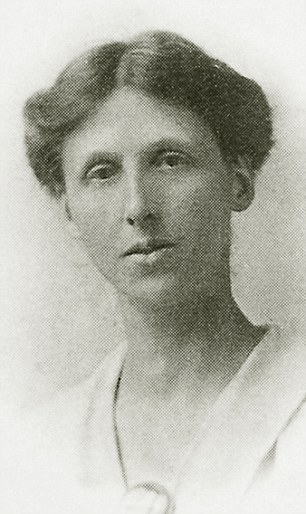
Olive Christiana Middleton (née Lupton)

Frank Lupton's eldest daughter Olive (1881–1936) was born at Newton Grove and grew up at Rockland on the Newton Park estate, a residential development on Lupton land in Potternewton. She was educated at Roedean School and was accepted to study at the University of Cambridge but remained at home with her father. In 1909, Olive Lupton was a member of the executive committee of the Leeds Association of Girls' Clubs. She volunteered at Stead Hostel, a home in Leeds for working women and girls supported by her father. In 1910, she was honorary secretary of the West Riding Ladies' Club.

In 1914, Olive Lupton married solicitor Noel Middleton who subsequently became a director of William Lupton & Co. During the First World War, she was a V.A.D. nurse at Gledhow Hall, the home of her second cousin, Lady Airedale whose daughter the Hon. Doris Kitson and her sister-in-law, Gertrude Middleton also volunteered. During this time, her husband was fighting on the Western Front.

Olive supported the Leeds Ladies' Association for the Care and Protection of Friendless Girls. In 1932, the association's annual meeting was held at Beechwood at the invitation of her cousins, the Misses Lupton.

In 1933, Olive Middleton was a member of the fundraising committee for Leeds General Infirmary's Appeal. Its patron was the Princess Royal to whom Olive played host. Other family members of the committee included Jessie Kitson and Elinor Lupton who launched the appeal.

In February 1935, Mrs Noel Middleton was elected as a governor of Leeds YWCA at the annual meeting.

Following her death from peritonitis in 1936, her descendants inherited trust funds established by her father. Noel Middleton's family sold William Lupton & Co to Pudsey textiles firm AW Hainsworth in 1958.

The Middletons' eldest son, Christopher Maurice (born 1915), changed his surname from Middleton to Lupton. Their youngest son, Oxford-educated pilot, Peter (1920–2010), is the grandfather of Catherine, Princess of Wales, Philippa Charlotte Matthews, and James William Middleton. He was co-pilot on Prince Philip's two-month tour of South America in 1962.

==== Anne Muriel Lupton ====
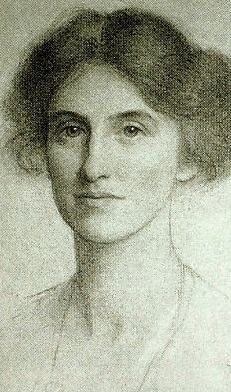
Anne Lupton

Francis Martineau's younger daughter, Anne, (1888–1967) attended Prior's Field School and Newnham College at Cambridge University. In the 1920s, Anne and her cousin Elinor Lupton were members of the Classical Association. She wished to enter the family business, but as women were excluded, she travelled for many years in South America and Canada. She never married, but on her return to England, set up home, a Boston marriage, in Chelsea with Enid Moberly Bell, the daughter and biographer of The Times editor Charles Frederic Moberly Bell. Moberly Bell was vice-chair of the Lyceum Club for female artists and writers and the first headmistress of Lady Margaret School in Parsons Green. In 1937 Anne Lupton financed the purchase of the Georgian property, Elm House – subsequently renamed Lupton House – in which the school is located. At Westminster Abbey on 17 October 2017, Lord Chartres "celebrated Anne's support of Lady Margaret School".

From June 1915, Anne Lupton was the secretary of the Leeds General Hospital Committee and the organising secretary of the 2nd Northern General Hospital at Beckett Park. Anne and her uncle Charles Lupton were guests when George V visited the Beckett Park Military Hospital on 27 September 1915. In March 1920, she was awarded the M.B.E. for her voluntary work for the Leeds Local War Pensions Committee.

Anne's college friend – Dorothy Winifred, elder daughter of Charles Davison, SC.D., of Birmingham, married her brother, Francis Ashford Lupton in August 1914.They had a daughter Ruth Hester (1915-1952). She married Arne Hiorth, co-founder of the Norwegian furniture manufacturer and design workshop Hiorth og Østlyngen.

A leading welfare campaigner, by 1935 Anne had founded the London Housing Centre and worked as its organiser. In 1938, she organised an exhibition for the centenary of Octavia Hill's birth which was visited at her request by Queen Mary. Other visitors who met with Anne at the centre were George V, Edward VIII and the Queen Mother. Lupton collected the material for Moberly Bell's biography of Octavia Hill.

==== Geoffrey Lupton ====
Geoffrey Lupton (1882–1949), eldest son of Henry Lupton (died 1932), was a significant figure in the Arts and Crafts Movement. He apprenticed himself to Ernest Gimson, described by the art critic Nikolaus Pevsner as "the greatest of the English architect-designers". Lupton Hall was built at Bedales School in 1911. Lupton and his siblings had attended the school. He largely financed the project and commissioned Gimson to design the building.

==== Barbara Lupton (Lady Bullock) ====
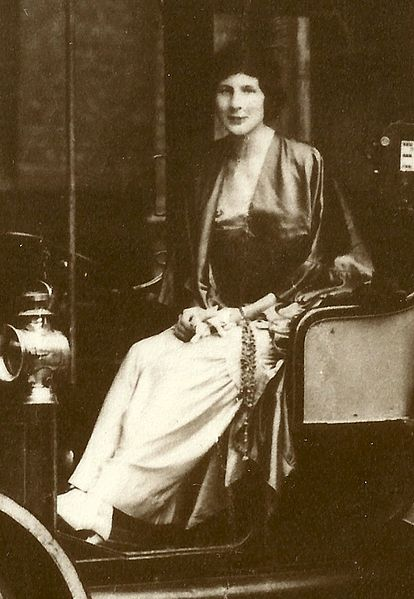
Barbara Lupton

Henry Lupton's daughter, Barbara (1891–1974), grew up in Headingley, and attended Bedales School, Newnham College, Cambridge (1910–1913) and the London School of Economics (1913–1914) where she obtained a social science qualification. The 1923 volume Newnham College, Cambridge University War Work records that during the First World War she worked for the war effort; Barbara for the Ministry of Munitions Welfare Department from 1915 to 1919.

Barbara met Christopher Bullock through her cousin, Hugh Ralph Lupton (1893–1983) who, alongside Bullock, was a member of the First and Third Trinity Boat Club. Barbara and Bullock were married in London in April 1917.

==== Agnes and Norman Darnton Lupton ====
Siblings Agnes (1874–1950) and Norman Darnton Lupton (1875–1953), were the grandchildren of Darnton Lupton. Their parents were William Walter Lupton (1844–1913) and Lucy Hannah Chadwick (1845–1931). William was Director of Joshua Buckton & co. Their maternal grandfather was Charles Chadwick M.D. (1815–1886), President of the British Medical Association, physician to Leeds General Infirmary for twenty-eight years. The siblings left a substantial bequest to Leeds Art Gallery in 1952. Norman, who attended Marlborough College and Trinity College, Cambridge was a mechanical engineer and artist. He shared his love of art with architect, Sydney Decimus Kitson (1871–1937). Norman held the rank of Major during the First World War. Their donation to Leeds Art Gallery included works by John Sell Cotman, Thomas Girtin and J. M. W. Turner. Their eldest brother was William George Lupton (1871–1911) of The Green, Bromyard, Herefordshire, who, like his brother Norman, studied at Marlborough College.

==== Alan Cecil Lupton ====
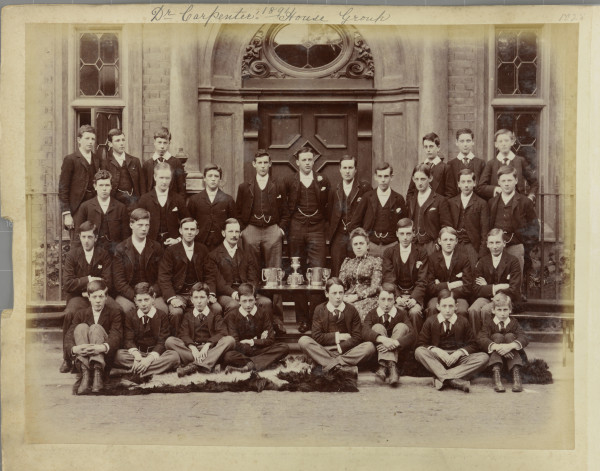
Alan Cecil Lupton in 1891 at Eton College – 3rd row, 4th from right

Darnton Lupton's grandson, Alan Cecil Lupton (1873–1949) was born in Leeds and attended Eton College and Trinity College, Cambridge but did not graduate from the latter. In 1905, he married Mary Emma, daughter of Sir Charles Raymond Burrell, 6th Baronet and sister of his fellow Old Etonian, Sir Merrik Burrell, 7th Baronet. Her maternal grandfather was Sir Robert Loder, 1st Baronet. Alan's sister, Alice Hilda Lupton (1876–1953) married Walter Lyulph Johnson (1872–1938), a fellow Old Etonian and grandson of Sir Lowthian Bell, 1st Baronet whose first cousin, Gertrude Bell, referenced Alan in her published letters. Alan was a J.P. and lived at Ainderby Hall, near Northallerton where he farmed. During the First World War, he and his father acquired horses for the Army Remount Service. In 1934, Alan's only daughter, Marjorie, married Godfrey Vyvyan Stopford, grandson of James Stopford, 6th Earl of Courtown.

== Legacy ==
Many memorials to the Lupton family lie within Leeds Minster. More recent memorials are found in St John's Church in Roundhay, and Mill Hill Chapel, where a stained glass window commemorates the family.

By the outbreak of the Second World War the land at Potternewton Hall and Newton Hall – the Newton Park Estate – had become the largest private housing estate in Leeds. Elinor and Elizabeth Lupton were the third generation to inhabit Beechwood. They regularly opened their gardens to the public during the 1940s and 1950s. During the late 1970s and 1980s, Beechwood College was a base for co-operative education and for a time housed the office of the Industrial Common Ownership Movement (ICOM).

Farmland surrounding Beechwood was sold to Leeds City Council by the 1950s for the Seacroft council estate and 500 council houses, shops, parks and Beechwood Primary School were built on it. Beechwood, the Georgian mansion remained in the family into the 1990s. In 2014, Mr M., Mr D. and Ms H. Lupton, great nephews and niece of Elinor and Elizabeth Lupton, retained ownership of some of the estate. They were keen to ensure that, despite housing developments on Asket Hill, as wildlife lovers, they would protect their family's land, "just as their great aunts had done years ago". The Lupton name is commemorated in Leeds by the Leeds University's Lupton Residences, Lupton House at Leeds Grammar School, the Leeds street names Lupton Avenue and Lupton Street and Lupton's Field at Asket Hill, Roundhay.

The D and L of DLA Piper are in honour of Thomas Townend Dibb and Charles Lupton.

One block of the Quarry Hill flats, built in 1938 in Leeds, was named Lupton House, and Lupton Hall at Bedales School, was named after Geoffrey Lupton.

== Sources ==
- Fraser, Derek, ed. (1980). A History of Modern Leeds. Manchester University Press. ISBN 0-7190-0781-X.
- Hanks, Patrick; Coates, Richard; McClure, Peter, eds. (2017). The Oxford Dictionary of Family Names in Britain and Ireland. Oxford University Press.
- Morris, R. J. (1990). Class, Sect and Party: The Making of the Middle Class in Leeds 1820–1850. Manchester University Press. ISBN 0-7190-2225-8.
- Morris, R. J. (2005). Men, Women and Property in England, 1780–1870: A Social and Economic History. Cambridge University Press. ISBN 978-0-521-09346-0.
- Pullan, Margaret (2007). The Monuments of the Parish Church of St Peter-at-Leeds. Maney Publishing. ISBN 978-1-9059-8152-6.
- Wilson, R. G. (1971). Gentlemen Merchants: The Merchant Community in Leeds, 1820–1850. Manchester University Press. ISBN 0-7190-0459-4.
