= Jessie Beatrice Kitson =

Lord Mayor of Leeds, UK (1876–1865)

- Born: 1876
- Died: 1965 (aged 88–89)
- Known for: First woman to be Lord Mayor of Leeds

Jessie Beatrice Kitson (1876–1965) was the first woman to be Lord Mayor of Leeds, West Riding of Yorkshire, England. She was Lord Mayor from 1942 to 1943.

== Life ==
Kitson came from the well-known Leeds family and was the fourth member of the family to serve as lord mayor. Her parents were John Hawthorn Kitson, brother of James Kitson, 1st Baron Airedale (1835–1911), engineer and MP, and Jessie, née Ollershaw. Her grandfather was James Kitson senior (1807–1885), the founder of Kitson and Company. Her brother was the artist Robert Hawthorn Kitson (1873–1947). She attended Halliwick School. She became close friends with Princess Mary who lived nearby at Harewood House. She was also a correspondent of Mary Kingsley, who she stayed in contact with after she spoke in Leeds.

Kitson had several close female friendships throughout her lifetime, including Miss E M Woodgate, to whose home she retired to in 1945. A close friend in Leeds was Ethel Mallinson.

== Career ==
Public service was central to Kitson's work: in 1913 she was elected to the Leeds Board of Guardians. However, although she was a member of the Otley Women's Liberal Association 1914-15, she tried to stay apart from party politics. She spoke publicly against women's suffrage. She did stand to be an independent councillor after the First World War, but was not elected.

Kitson was elected Lord Mayor of the County Borough of Leeds on 18 November 1942 due to her work in public life in Leeds. The previous Lord Mayor, Arthur Clark, died on 9 November, shortly after being elected to the position. With her appointment she became the first woman to be Lord Mayor of Leeds. Kitson's friend Elinor Gertrude Lupton (1886–1979) served as her Lady Mayoress. Lupton described herself and Kitson as "the two worst dressed ladies in Leeds". The two women were related; Lupton's second cousin, Lady Airedale née Florence von Schunck (d.1942), had married Kitson's first cousin - Albert Kitson, 2nd Baron Airedale (d.1944) - in Leeds in 1890.

Jessie Beatrice Kitson's portrait was painted in oils by A. R. Middleton Todd. It is held in Leeds Civic Hall.

At her death in 1965, she was described as "of "Elmet", Brimpton, near Reading" and left an estate of £38,281.

== Honours ==
In 1944, the University of Leeds conferred on Kitson the honorary degree of LL.D.
