= David Blythe Foster =

British politician

David Blythe Foster (20 June 1858 – 10 July 1948) was a British politician who served as Lord Mayor of Leeds.

Foster was born in Holme-on-Spalding-Moor. A keen Methodist, he was a lay preacher, and volunteered with the Leeds Central Mission. His experiences there led him to write a book, Leeds Slumdom. He ran a dressmakers' warehouse, and from 1893 limited working hours to 48 per week, and paid what he considered to be a living wage.

In 1891, Foster was elected as a Liberal Party member of the Holbeck Board of Guardians, but his views proved too radical for the party, which refused to support him the following year. Foster stood down, but ran as an independent progressive in 1894. In 1895, he joined the Independent Labour Party, and stood repeatedly for Leeds Town Council in Armley and Wortley. He decided, in 1897, to live on an average worker's wage.

Foster also joined the Labour Church movement in 1895, and supported the Leeds Brotherhood Church. He served as president of the Labour Church Union in 1902/03, but became disillusioned, believing it was insufficiently Christian, and he tried to start his own socialist Christian church in Bradford.

Foster became secretary of the Leeds Labour Representation Committee in 1902, and in 1911 he was finally elected to the council, winning a seat in Hunslet. In 1928, he served as Lord Mayor of Leeds.

Foster died in Leeds, aged 90.

Civic offices
Preceded by George Ratcliffe	Lord Mayor of Leeds; 1928	Succeeded by Nathaniel George Morrison
