= Lady mayoress =

Female companion to a Lord Mayor

Lady mayoress is an official female companion to the lord mayor of a major city in the United Kingdom or Republic of Ireland, or a capital city of an Australian state. Traditionally this was the wife of a male mayor.

It is not an elected office. Lady is used here as a title of respect. The lady mayoress accompanies the lord mayor to many events and in the past may also carry out engagements on her own.

As an example, the Leeds Children's Charity states that "it has been the right of every new lady mayoress to become the president of the charity".

== Variations ==
The lady mayoress was traditionally the wife of a male lord mayor. In a post-patriarchal society, a female mayor can choose any lady mayoress. Some mayors have chosen their daughter, mother, or another female relative.

A male companion for a female mayor may be given the title of lord mayor's consort.

When Jessie Beatrice Kitson was the first female lord mayor of Leeds, West Yorkshire, England in 1942–1943, she chose her friend Elinor Gertrude Lupton as her lady mayoress.

When Bernard Atha was lord mayor of Leeds in 2000–2001, he selected 18 "high-profile, well-known Yorkshire women" to act in turn as his lady mayoress.

== Australia ==
The lady mayoress of an Australian capital city is generally the wife of an elected lord mayor. A lady mayoress acts as a hostess for the city at official functions and sometimes acts as Chair of social and charitable committees.

Where a woman is elected to the office of lord mayor, there is usually no lady mayoress. Although, during part of the time in office as lord mayor of Brisbane of Sallyanne Atkinson, her mother served as lady mayoress. Atkinson's husband had served for a time as the president of the City of Brisbane Benefit Fund, a social and charitable organisation associated with the Brisbane City Council.
