= Steven E. Foster =

United States Air Force general

Steven E. Foster Steven E. Foster
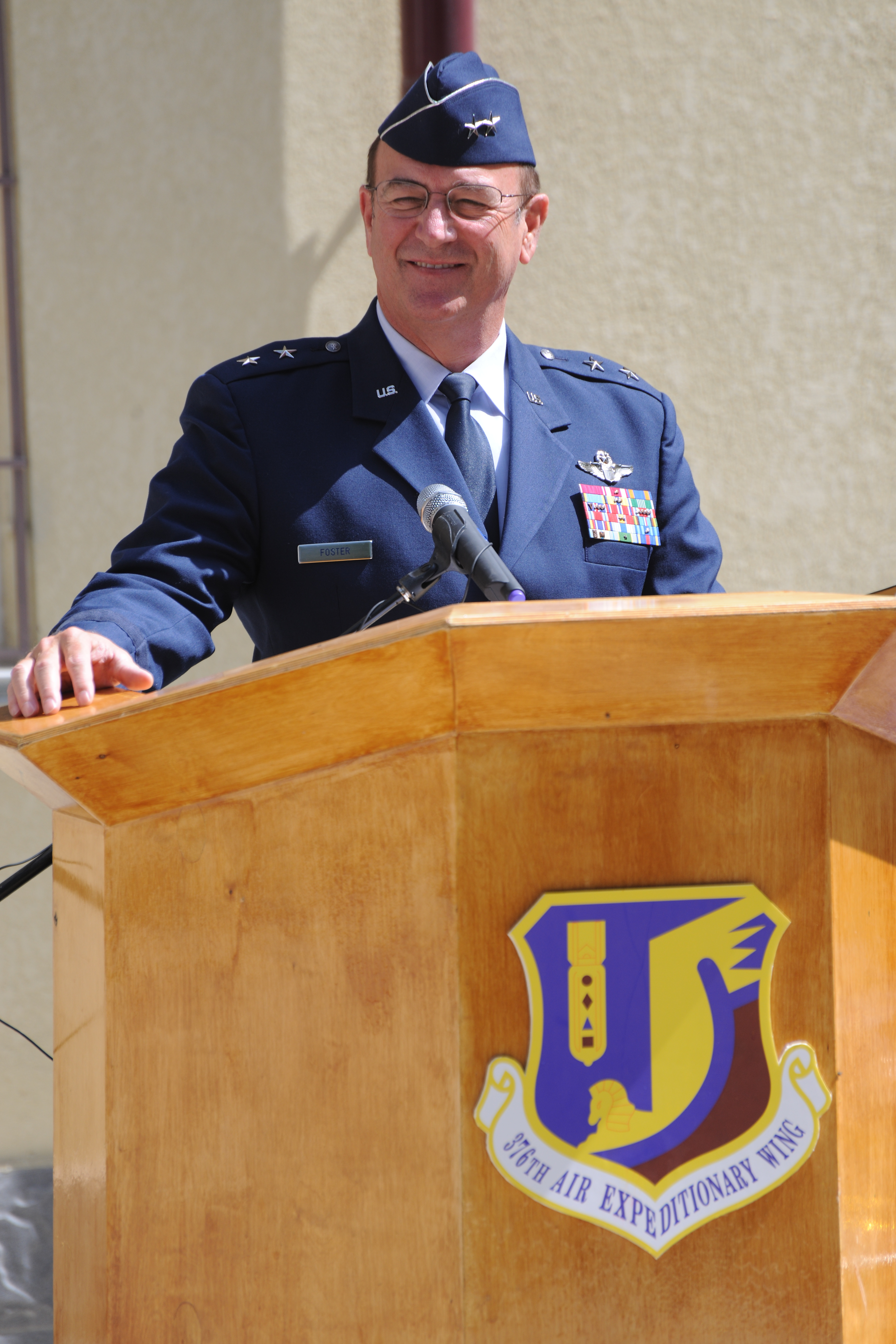
- Education: United States Air Force Academy; Webster University
- Military career
- Allegiance: United States
- Branch: United States Air Force
- Rank: Major General

Steven E. Foster is a former major general in the United States Air National Guard and mobilization assistant to the commander of North American Aerospace Defense Command. Previously assignments include commander of the 115th Fighter Wing of the Wisconsin Air National Guard. He has acquired more than 3,800 hours flying in a Cessna T-37 Tweet, Northrop T-38 Talon, Cessna O-2 Skymaster, Fairchild Republic A-10 Thunderbolt II, and General Dynamics F-16 Fighting Falcon. As a civilian he pilots a McDonnell Douglas MD-11 for FedEx Express.

Awards he has received include the Legion of Merit, the Meritorious Service Medal, the Air Medal, the Aerial Achievement Medal, the Air Force Commendation Medal, the Army Commendation Medal, the Air Force Outstanding Unit Award with valor device, the Air Force Organizational Excellence Award, the Combat Readiness Medal with silver oak leaf cluster and four bronze oak leaf clusters, the National Defense Service Medal, the Armed Forces Expeditionary Medal, the Global War on Terrorism Service Medal, the Air Force Overseas Ribbon, the Air Force Longevity Service Award with silver oak leaf cluster, the Armed Forces Reserve Medal with hourglass device, the Small Arms Expert Marksmanship Ribbon with service star, the Air Force Training Ribbon.

In 2010, Foster was Air National Guard Assistant to the Commander, Air Forces Central, Shaw Air Force Base, South Carolina.

== Education ==
- 1977 Bachelor of Science degree, United States Air Force Academy
- 1978 Undergraduate Pilot Training
- 1983 Squadron Officer School
- 1986 Master of Business Administration degree, Webster University, St. Louis, Missouri
- 1999 Air War College, by correspondence
