= David Kirby Foster =

David Kirby or "D. K." Foster (1882–1969) was a prominent Baptist minister, influential community leader in Arkansas and Missouri, and a friend and counselor to President Harry S. Truman.

== Biography ==
Foster was born and raised in the former community of Pitman, in Randolph County, Arkansas. After graduating from Ouachita College in Maynard, Arkansas, Foster worked as both an educator and minister in Arkansas and Missouri. Foster eventually became pastor of the First Baptist Church of Caruthersville, Missouri, a position which he held for 27 years.

Foster was an active supporter of the Democratic Party, and while he never ran for office himself, Foster had the reputation of being the "Reverend of 1,000 votes." Many candidates for state office would seek his endorsement before making their runs.

During Harry S. Truman's 1934 run for the United States Senate, Truman was virtually unknown in southeast Missouri, and what was known concerned his associations with the Pendergast machine. After being rebuffed by local Democrats, he sought the assistance of Foster, who arranged for Truman to make a speech at the Pemiscot County courthouse in Caruthersville. Truman made a very favorable impression during the speech, and Foster's support was later credited with winning Truman the southeast Missouri vote, and perhaps the entire election for the Senate.

Afterwards, Truman and Foster struck up a lifelong friendship, and Truman would visit Foster and his family during what would become yearly visits to Caruthersville. Correspondence between the two is maintained by the Harry S. Truman Presidential Library and Museum in Independence, Missouri.
