= Municipal year =

Legal year used for local government in England & Wales

The municipal year is a period used by local government in the United Kingdom. The municipal year usually begins in May, following any local elections. It is not a fixed date so the number of days in any municipal year varies.

== History ==
The municipal year has been in use as a concept since at least 1555, and has also been used – very occasionally – by town councils in the United States, though much less so now.

The start of the municipal year follows any local elections taking place that year. Some councils have elections every four years whereas others have elections on three years out of four, with a third of seats contested at each election.

Historically, in England the beginning of a new municipal year took place in November when the local authorities elections took place, and was a traditional time for celebration and festivities. In Newcastle-under-Lyme in the 19th century, the election was known as Mayor-choosing day, or clouting-out day, and was – according to one contemporary source, "the very Saturnalia of play." Large-scale street games were played by children (imprisonment and subsequent rescue, or "clouting out", with knotted ropes, of young people was the source of the name), and the free distribution of apples and penny coins were also customs. In the Irish city of Galway, in the Middle Ages, the newly appointed or -elected officers would, by convention, provide an enormous feast for the town's "more distinguished citizens", while others took to the streets and made merry.

The Representation of the People Act 1948 changed the time of local elections to April for county councillors and May for borough councillors.

== Function ==
=== England and Wales ===
The Local Government Act 1972 Section 99 requires that an annual meeting must take place between 8 and 21 days of the election of councillors, and outside of election years the annual meeting can take place on any day in March, April or May.

Section 23 (1) requires that "the election of the chairman shall be the first business transacted at the annual meeting of a principal council". Vice-chairmen are also elected by the councillors. The chairman and vice-chairman of a borough in England, and a county borough in Wales, is known as mayor (spelt maer in Welsh) and deputy mayor (dirprwy faer in Welsh). In councils with directly-elected mayor executive arrangements, a chairman or civic mayor is elected by the councillors in the same way.

During the rest of the year the council can hold as many meetings as are required.

== See also ==
- Academic year
- Fiscal year
- Local government in England
- Local government in Northern Ireland
- Local government in Scotland
- Local government in the United Kingdom
- Local government in Wales
