= David Jack Foster =

United States Army general

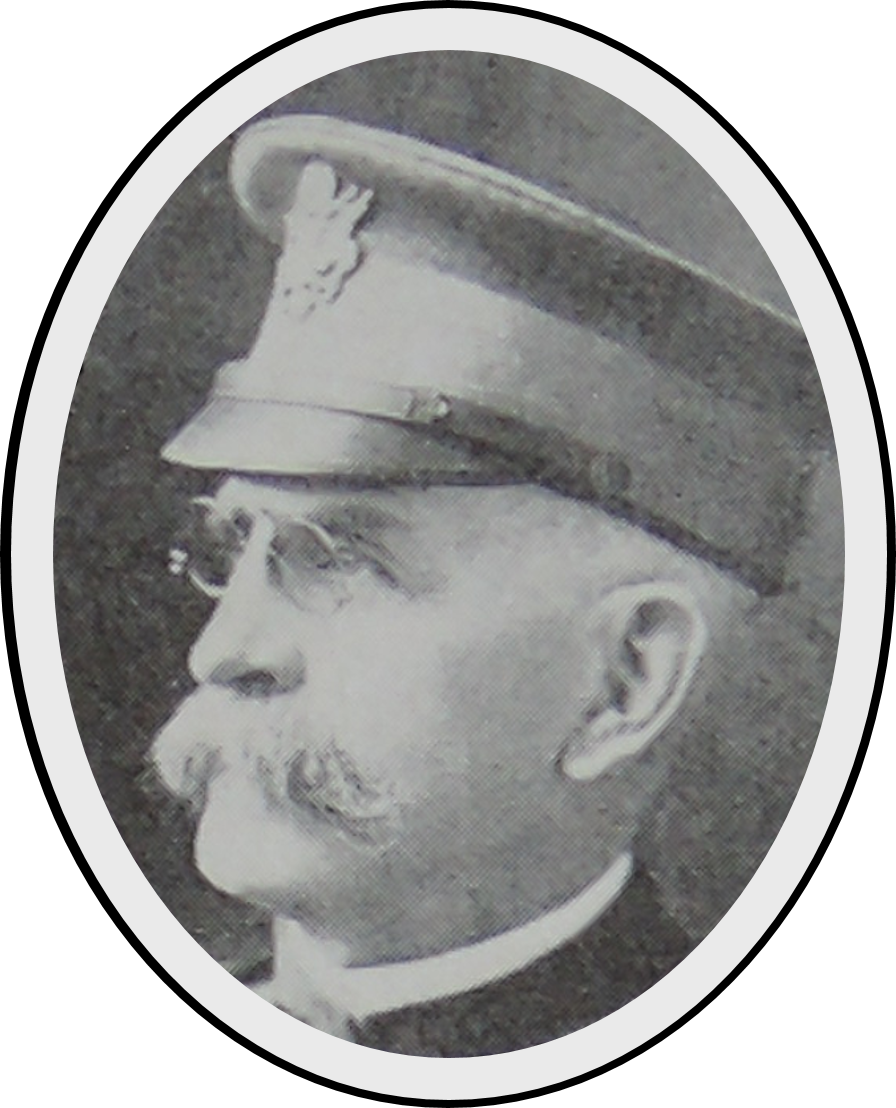
- Born: November 2, 1859; Princeton, Illinois
- Died: September 10, 1948 (aged 88); Illinois Central Hospital
- Spouse: Caroline Horton
- Military career
- Allegiance: United States
- Branch: United States Army
- Service years: 1877–1918
- Rank: Brigadier general
- Conflicts: Spanish–American War; Border War (1910–19); World War I

David Jack Foster (November 2, 1859 – September 10, 1948) was a United States Army officer in the late 19th and early 20th centuries. He served in the Spanish–American War and World War I.

== Biography ==
Foster was born on November 2, 1859, in Princeton, Illinois. His father died when he was young, and after attending the local public schools, Foster went to Chicago in order get find better opportunities, with several members of his family following him shortly after. On July 17, 1877, after making a living by selling insurance and working at the local post office, Foster enlisted in the Sixth Illinois Infantry.

A year after his enlistment, Foster was commissioned as a second lieutenant, and on February 11, 1879, he was promoted to first lieutenant. Upon his promotion to captain on July 27, 1880, Foster assumed command over Company B of the Fourth Illinois Infantry, and he commanded the Sixth Illinois Infantry after his promotion to colonel on January 6, 1893. On May 11, 1898, Foster and his regiment were mobilized into service because of the Spanish–American War, and they traveled to Cuba and Puerto Rico, where they remained until September 7 of that same year before being mustered out on November 25.

Foster was promoted to the rank of brigadier general of the Illinois National Guard on August 3, 1903, and he assumed command over the 32nd Infantry Brigade in Chicago. He assumed command over the First Infantry Brigade in 1907. Foster and his brigade were stationed on the border with Mexico from June to October 1916, and they were mobilized for service in World War I on July 25, 1917. Commissioned as a brigadier general on August 5, 1917, Foster commanded the 64th Infantry Brigade, which later became the 66th Brigade. Foster failed a physical exam for general officers, and he retired on January 8, 1918.

After his retirement, Foster worked as the superintendent of the Chicago Post Office, and he lived at the Gladstone Hotel in the city. He died on September 10, 1948, after three weeks of illness.

== Personal life ==
Foster married Caroline Horton, from the same town as himself, in 1910. They had no children, and she died 20 years before he did.
