= Quidenham Hall =

Country house in Norfolk, England

Coordinates: 52.4498°N 0.9894°E

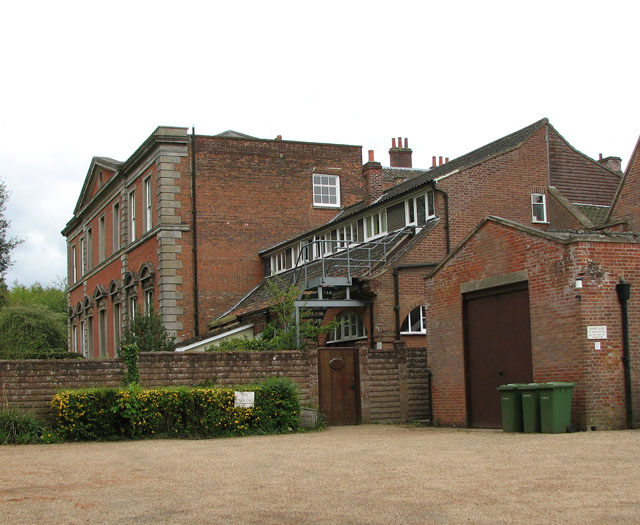
Quidenham Hall

Quidenham Hall is a country house at Quidenham in Norfolk, England.

== History ==
A dwelling is known to have existed on the site as far back as the year 1000, which passed to the Bedingfeld family around 1400. In 1572 the manor was bought by John Holland, a local Member of Parliament. The present house dates to around 1600 when John's son, Thomas, started building it. The East Wing and West portico were added later by John Bristow. The house remained in the Holland family until around 1800 when it was bought by George Keppel, 3rd Earl of Albemarle: it then passed down the Keppel family. It was regularly visited by Edward VII in the early years of the 20th century. In 1948 the house was acquired from the Keppel family by the Carmelites of Rushmere, Ipswich who re-established it as a monastery of Carmelite nuns. In 1989 some cottages on the property, formerly used as staff living accommodation by the Keppel family, were made over to a hospice for sick children now under the management of East Anglia's Children's Hospices, an independent charity under the patronage of Catherine, Princess of Wales. Quidenham Hall itself remains in the hands of the Carmelite community.

== Grounds ==
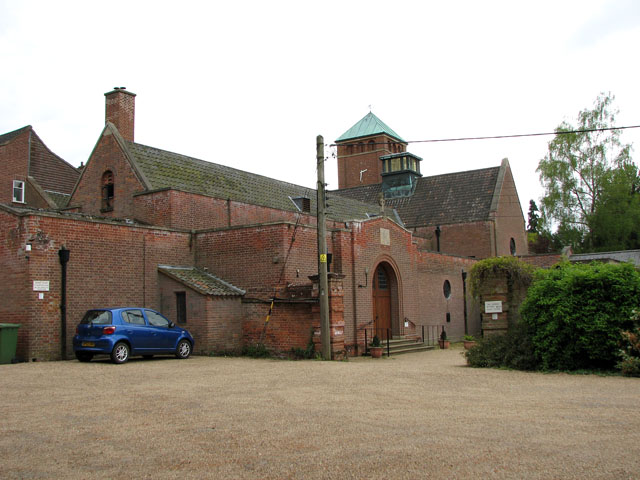
Monastery

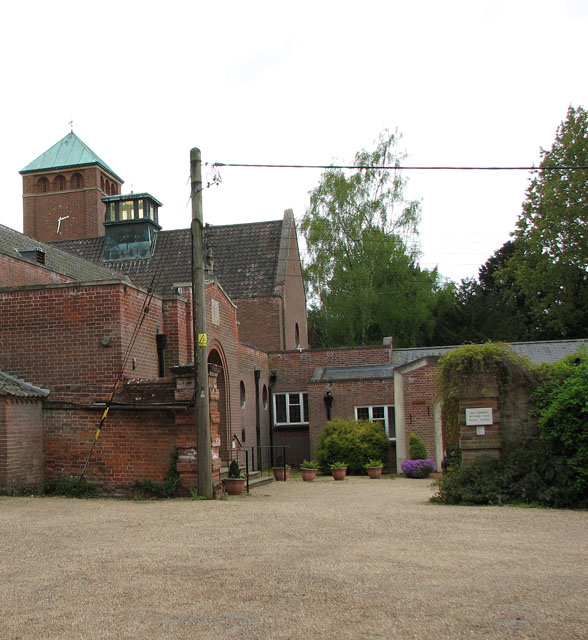
Entrance

== See also ==
- Media related to Quidenham Monastery at Wikimedia Commons
