= Ann Lesley Smith =

American journalist (born 1956)

- Born: Ann Lesley Krohn; December 27, 1956 (age 69); Ohio, United States
- Education: Petaluma High School 1975; Idaho State University (dental hygiene)
- Occupations: Journalist; former volunteer prison chaplain; dental hygienist; model; musician
- Spouses: John B. Huntington (divorced) Michael Carabello (divorced) Chester Smith (died 2008)

Ann Lesley Smith (born December 27, 1956) is an American former radio host.

After working in modeling, Smith was the host of the KFIV Ann Lesley Live radio show. Smith worked as a Christian minister for the Manteca Police Department and the Marin County Sheriff's Office, before returning to journalism.

She was married to Michael Carabello and later to Chester Smith until his death in 2008. She was briefly engaged to Australian-American newspaper magnate Rupert Murdoch for two weeks in late March 2023.

Smith lives on her ranch near Riverbank, California, in Northern California.

== Early life ==
Born as Ann Lesley Krohn in 1956 or 1957, she grew up in Petaluma, California, and graduated from Petaluma High School on May 21, 1975. She studied at Idaho State University.

== Career ==
After graduating from college, Smith worked as a self-employed dental hygienist. Prior to her first marriage, she also worked as a model, a radio journalist and as a singer-songwriter in San Francisco. She ran the radio show Ann Lesley Live on KFIV. Later she volunteered as a Christian minister doing prison chaplaincy for the Manteca Police Department and the Marin County Sheriff's Office, before returning to journalism, working for Rupert Murdoch's newspaper group.

She is the founder of the Angels All Over non-profit organisation that supports people experiencing homelessness.

== Personal life ==
In 1985, at the age of 28, Smith married John B. Huntington, aged 47, a lawyer and philanthropist of the Huntington Railroad family. The marriage ended in divorce, just before Smith became an evangelical Christian.

In 1988, Reuters reported that Smith pleaded no contest to misdemeanor assault, "a shoving match", at a social gala on a dance floor in the Fairmont San Francisco.

In 1999, Smith married Michael Carabello, a Santana former percussionist.

In 2005, at 47, she married American musician and radio and television broadcaster Chester Smith, aged 74, wedded until his death in 2008. The couple released the Captured by Love album in 2005. She was a prison chaplain for the California Department of Corrections when they met.

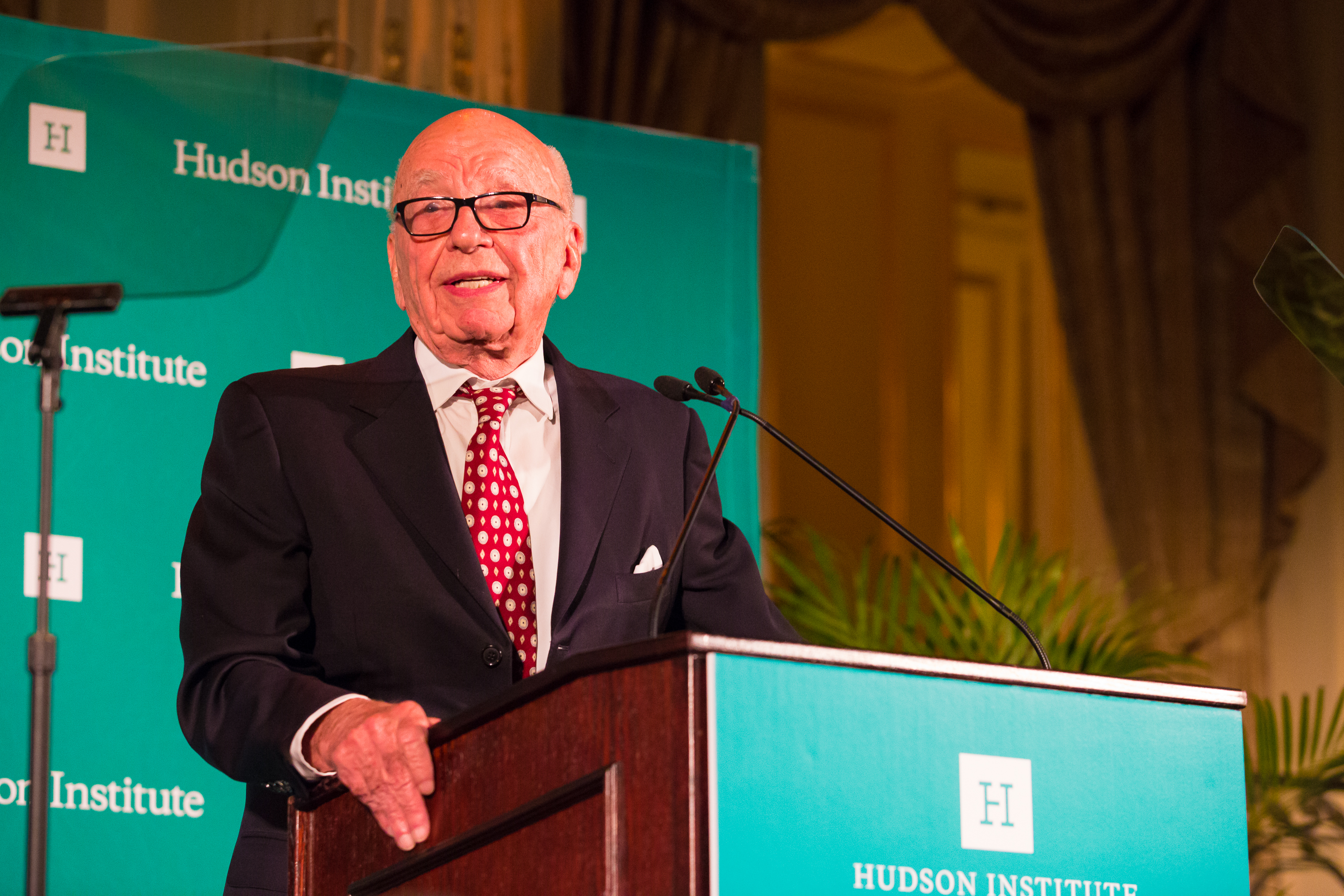
Rupert Murdoch in 2015

Smith became engaged to Australian-American business magnate and billionaire Rupert Murdoch on March 17, 2023, in New York City. The couple met at his Moraga Estate, winery in Bel Air, California. Murdoch divorced Jerry Hall seven months prior. The couple had plans to marry in the summer of 2023. In March 2023, author Rhonda Garelick reported on the age difference (26 years) and the imbalance of power between the billionaire and Smith and questioned if the engagement was strategically timed to deflect attention from Murdoch's court case with Dominion Voting Systems. On April 4, 2023, Vanity Fair reported that Murdoch had called off the engagement. The split was said to be caused by Murdoch's discomfort with Smith's admiration for Fox News host Tucker Carlson, reportedly referring to him as "a messenger from God"; the split came three weeks before Carlson was fired from Fox News.

Smith lives on her ranch near Riverbank, California, which has grapes and olive trees.

== See also ==
- Murdoch family
