= Hold Still: A Portrait of Our Nation in 2020 =

2021 photographic book on the COVID-19 pandemic

- Author: National Portrait Gallery
- Language: English
- Subject: COVID-19 pandemic in the United Kingdom
- Genre: Photography
- Publisher: National Portrait Gallery Publications
- Publication date: 7 May 2021
- Publication place: United Kingdom
- Media type: Hardback
- Pages: 168
- ISBN: 978-1-8551473-86

Hold Still: A Portrait of Our Nation in 2020 is a 2021 photographic book published by the National Portrait Gallery centering around the COVID-19 pandemic in the United Kingdom. For the campaign “Hold Still”, the British public submitted pictures taken during the lockdown period of the pandemic for exhibition. Catherine, Duchess of Cambridge, and a panel of experts, including Nicholas Cullinan, Lemn Sissay, Ruth May, and Maryam Wahid, curated the photographs featured in the book.

== Background and publication ==
In May 2020, the then Duchess of Cambridge launched "Hold Still", a photography project to capture life during lockdown in Britain, which garnered 31,000 submissions from participants aged four to seventy-five years old. The core themes of the exhibition focused on "Helpers and Heroes, Your New Normal and Acts of Kindness." In July 2020, the exhibition was released and displayed the final 100 photographs online. In October 2020, the portraits were displayed on 112 public sites, including billboards, murals, and posters, across 80 towns and cities. The online exhibition collected over 5.2 million page views.

In March 2021, Catherine announced the exhibition was to become a photographic book titled Hold Still: A Portrait of Our Nation in 2020. The book was published on 7 May. To commemorate the release, 150 copies of the book were hidden across the country. Proceeds from the sales were announced to be divided between National Portrait Gallery and mental health charity Mind. Audio recordings of phone calls with the Duchess and Hold Still photographers discussing the background of the pictures were also released.

== Synopsis ==
The introductory text, written by Catherine, stated the intention of creating a historical record of "individuals’ stories and document significant moments for families and communities as we lived through the pandemic". The book contains 100 "poignant and personal” images taken throughout the pandemic. Descriptors of featured images include a nurse in personal protective equipment attending to patients, Captain Tom Moore completing his walkathon for charity, a demonstrator at the 2020 Black Lives Matter protests, a pediatric cancer patient socially distanced from her father, a student receiving their GCSE results in quarantine, and an elderly couple holding hands in their hospital beds.

== Reception ==
Upon publication, Hold Still was reported to be a bestseller. The book charted on the lists of Amazon The Sunday Times and The Independent. The 100 photographs became a part of the National Portrait Gallery's permanent collection, with the cover portrait being hung at the Royal London Hospital to commemorate the work of the NHS during the pandemic. Hold Still won the accolade for the category "Best Use of Digital – UK" at the 2021 Museums + Heritage Awards, which recognizes excellence in gallery attractions.

== Exhibitions ==
- Hold Still Community Exhibition, National Portrait Gallery, 2020
