= Catherine, Princess of Wales =

Member of the British royal family (born 1982)

Catherine
- Princess of Wales
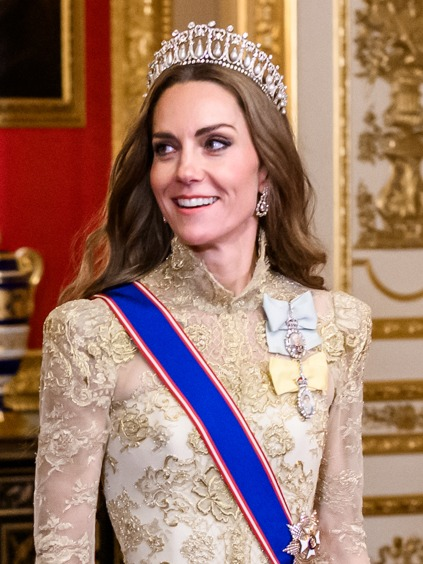
- Catherine in 2025
- Born: Catherine Elizabeth Middleton; 9 January 1982 (age 44); Royal Berkshire Hospital, Reading, England
- Spouse: William, Prince of Wales (m. 2011)
- Issue: Prince George of Wales; Princess Charlotte of Wales; Prince Louis of Wales
- House: Windsor (by marriage)
- Father: Michael Middleton
- Mother: Carole Goldsmith
- Education: University of St Andrews (MA Hons)

Catherine, Princess of Wales (born Catherine Elizabeth Middleton; (Note: Initially, the media reported her first name as "Kate", a diminutive of "Catherine". Despite later changes to her name and titles, segments of the public continued to use "Kate Middleton". The British media used "Kate" in their articles as a result of search engine optimisation. In November 2025, the BBC apologised to Catherine after receiving numerous complaints for failing to refer to her by her correct name and title.) 9 January 1982) is a member of the British royal family. She is married to William, Prince of Wales, the heir apparent to the British throne.

Born in Reading, Catherine grew up in Bucklebury, Berkshire. She was educated at St Andrew's School and Marlborough College before earning a degree in art history at the University of St Andrews in Scotland, where she met Prince William in 2001 and graduated in 2005. She held several jobs and undertook charity work before their engagement was announced in November 2010. She became Duchess of Cambridge on their marriage at Westminster Abbey on 29 April 2011. The couple have three children: George, Charlotte, and Louis. She became Princess of Wales on 9 September 2022, when William was created Prince of Wales by his father, King Charles III. In early 2024, she was diagnosed with cancer, underwent chemotherapy, and resumed duties later that year.

Following her marriage, Catherine has undertaken royal duties and engagements in support of the monarch and has represented the royal family on official overseas tours. Her charitable work, largely through the Royal Foundation, focuses on early childhood, addiction, and the arts. She is patron of several charitable and military organisations, including the Anna Freud Centre, Action for Children, SportsAid, and the National Portrait Gallery. To encourage public discussion of mental health, she helped develop the Heads Together campaign, launched with William and her brother-in-law Harry in April 2016.

Catherine's relationship with the media has attracted sustained attention, particularly her efforts to maintain privacy amid significant public interest. Her influence on fashion has been described as the "Kate Middleton effect". Catherine was named one of Time's most influential people in 2011, 2012, and 2013.

== Early life and education ==
Catherine Elizabeth Middleton was born on 9 January 1982 at the Royal Berkshire Hospital in Reading, the eldest child of Michael Middleton and Carole Middleton (née Goldsmith). Her parents were employed by British Airways; her father as a flight dispatcher and her mother as a flight attendant. She was baptised on 20 June at St Andrew's Bradfield, the local parish church. Catherine has two younger siblings, Philippa ("Pippa") (born 1983) and James (born 1987). Her paternal relatives benefited from family trust funds and were regarded as upper-middle-class with connections to the landed gentry; her great-grandparents Noël and Olive Middleton hosted members of the British royal family from the 1920s to the 1940s. Her maternal family, descended from coal miners, have been described as working class.

In 1984, the Middletons moved from Bradfield Southend, Berkshire, to Amman, Jordan, where Catherine attended an English-language nursery school. Following the family's return to Berkshire in September 1986, she was enrolled at St Andrew's School near Pangbourne, a private school, where she later boarded part-weekly. In 1987, her mother founded Party Pieces, a privately owned mail-order company supplying party goods. The family relocated to Bucklebury in 1995, and Catherine continued her education at Downe House School, before becoming a boarder at Marlborough College in Wiltshire. At Marlborough, she played several sports and captained the girls' field hockey team. She earned a gold Duke of Edinburgh Award and underwent an operation on the left side of her head, reportedly to remove a lump, during this period.

Although offered a place at the University of Edinburgh, Middleton took a gap year, studying at the British Institute of Florence and travelling to Chile to join a Raleigh International programme. She worked as a deckhand at the Port of Southampton during the summer preceding university. She subsequently enrolled at the University of St Andrews in Fife, initially studying psychology before focusing solely on art history. While at university, she worked part-time as a waitress and was an active member of The Lumsden Club, which organised fundraising events and community projects. She graduated in 2005 with an undergraduate Master of Arts (2:1 Hons) in art history.

== Personal life ==
=== Relationship with Prince William ===
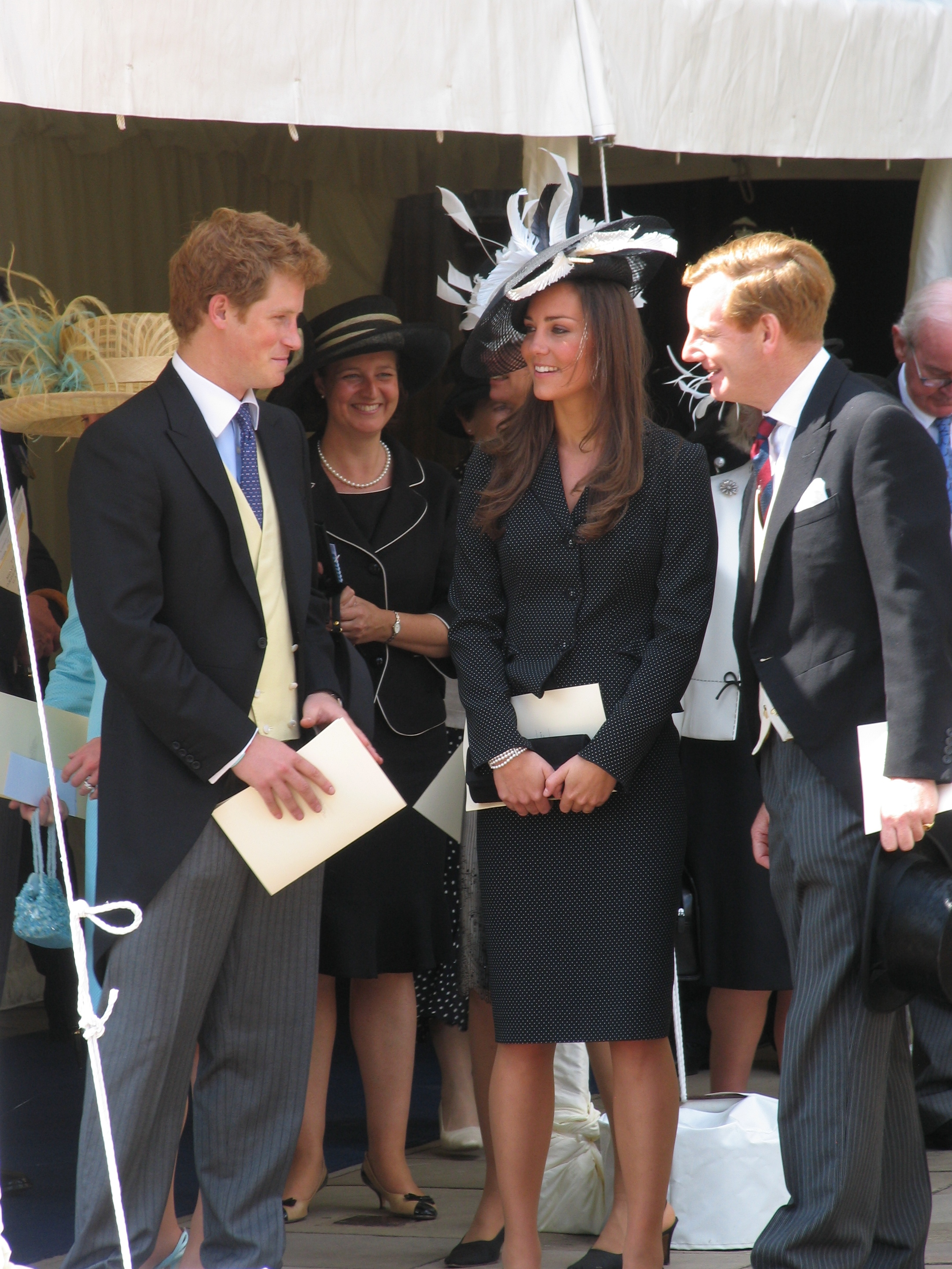
With Prince Harry (left) at William's Order of the Garter investiture, 2008

In 2001, Middleton met Prince William while they were students in residence at St Salvator's Hall. (Note: The author Katie Nicholl suggests that the couple met before going to St Andrews through mutual friends while Middleton was a student at Marlborough College.) She reportedly caught William's attention at a charity fashion show at the university in 2002. The couple began dating in 2003. During their second year, Middleton shared a flat with William and two friends. From 2003 until 2005, they lived at Balgove House on the Strathtyrum estate with two roommates. They also began staying at Tam-Na-Ghar, a cottage on the Balmoral estate that had been given to William by Queen Elizabeth the Queen Mother shortly before her death. The property has remained a private retreat for the couple in subsequent years. In 2004, the couple briefly separated before resuming their relationship.

In November 2006, Middleton commenced part-time work for 12 months as an accessories buyer with the clothing chain Jigsaw. She also worked as a project manager in the family business, where she was responsible for the website and catalogue.

Middleton attended William's Passing Out Parade at the Royal Military Academy Sandhurst in December 2006. In April 2007, they ended their relationship. It was subsequently reported that the couple had reconciled. In May 2008, Middleton attended the wedding of William's cousin Peter Phillips to Autumn Kelly in William's place, meeting Queen Elizabeth II for the first time.

Middleton attended the Order of the Garter procession at Windsor Castle in June 2008, where William was made a Royal Knight of the Garter. In July 2008, she was a guest at the wedding of Lady Rose Windsor and George Gilman while William was serving in the Caribbean aboard HMS Iron Duke. In June 2010, the couple moved into a cottage on the Bodorgan Estate in Anglesey, Wales, where William lived during his RAF search and rescue training and subsequent career. Before her marriage, Middleton lived with her sister Pippa in an apartment owned by their parents in Chelsea, London.

=== Marriage and children ===
Middleton and William became engaged in October 2010 at a remote alpine cabin on Mount Kenya during a ten-day visit to the Lewa Wildlife Conservancy. Clarence House announced the engagement on 16 November that year. William gave her the engagement ring that had belonged to his mother, Diana, Princess of Wales. Middleton was confirmed into the Church of England on 10 March at St James's Palace by the Bishop of London, with her family and William in attendance, ahead of the wedding.

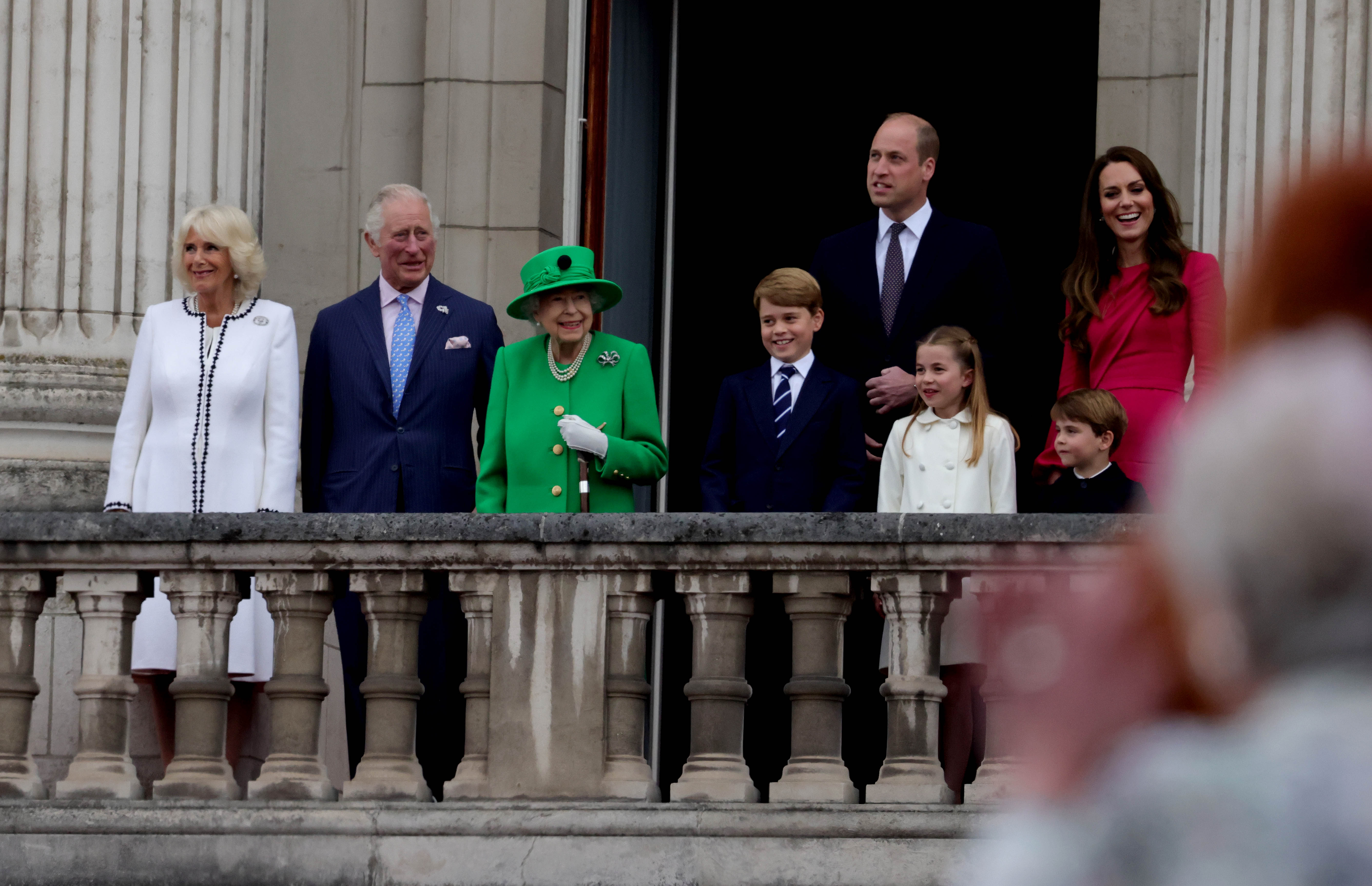
With William, their children and other senior royals on the balcony of Buckingham Palace following the Platinum Jubilee Pageant on 5 June 2022

The couple married on 29 April 2011 at Westminster Abbey on St Catherine's Day. The day was declared a bank holiday in the United Kingdom. Estimates of the global audience for the wedding reached around 300 million, whilst 26 million watched the event live in Britain. Her wedding dress was designed by Sarah Burton at Alexander McQueen. Catherine was styled as "Her Royal Highness The Duchess of Cambridge". The couple were given Anmer Hall, a country home on the Sandringham estate, as a wedding gift from the Queen.

In December 2012, St James's Palace announced that Catherine was pregnant with her first child. The announcement was made earlier than usual as she had been admitted to King Edward VII's Hospital with hyperemesis gravidarum, a severe form of morning sickness. She gave birth to Prince George at St Mary's Hospital, London, in July 2013. The condition recurred during her subsequent pregnancies, leading Catherine to cancel official engagements. She gave birth to Princess Charlotte in May 2015 and to Prince Louis in April 2018. George, Charlotte, and Louis were respectively third, fourth, and fifth in the line of succession to the British throne at the times of their births. Following the death of Queen Elizabeth II, they became second, third, and fourth in line to the throne. They owned an English Cocker Spaniel, Lupo, who died in 2020, and now have Orla and one of her puppies, Otto, both of the same breed.

Following their marriage, Catherine and William continued to reside in Anglesey in a rented four-bedroom farmhouse on the Bodorgan Home Farm estate while William worked as an RAF search and rescue pilot. They also used Nottingham Cottage as their London residence. In 2013, they moved into the 20-room Apartment 1A at Kensington Palace, which had been renovated over 18 months at a cost of £4.5 million. It became their main residence in 2017. In September 2022, the family moved to Adelaide Cottage in the grounds of Windsor Castle, where they lived until October 2025. Forest Lodge is their current residence.

=== Health ===
In January 2024, Kensington Palace announced that Catherine had undergone planned abdominal surgery at the London Clinic for an undisclosed condition. She postponed engagements through March, prompting public speculation and conspiracy theories.

On 22 March, in a video message, Catherine revealed that post-operative tests had found cancer and that she had begun chemotherapy in late February. Her leave was extended as treatment continued.

Catherine returned to public view at Trooping the Colour in June. In September, she announced the end of chemotherapy and her intention to resume duties. In October, she met families of the victims of the 2024 Southport stabbings in her first official engagement since treatment. In January 2025, following a visit to the Royal Marsden Hospital, where she had received treatment, Catherine confirmed she was in remission.

== Duchess of Cambridge ==
=== Within the United Kingdom ===
Middleton made her first public appearance with William following their engagement announcement in November 2010 at a fundraiser organised by the Teenage Cancer Trust in December. She made her first official public appearance in February 2011, when the couple attended a lifeboat-naming ceremony in Trearddur. The following month, they undertook a visit to Belfast.

Catherine's first official engagement after her wedding came in May that year, when she and William met US president Barack Obama and First Lady Michelle Obama at Buckingham Palace. Reporters noted the warm exchanges between the two families. In October, she carried out her first solo engagement at a reception for In Kind Direct at Clarence House, standing in for the then Prince Charles. In March 2012, she gave her first public speech at the opening of a children's hospice supported by her patronage, East Anglia's Children's Hospices. She and William were announced as ambassadors for the 2012 Summer Olympics in London, attending numerous sporting events throughout the Games. They also took part in celebrations marking Queen Elizabeth II's Diamond Jubilee, including the Thames Diamond Jubilee Pageant in July. They made their first visit to Cambridge as Duke and Duchess in November 2012.

In February 2019, Catherine and William undertook a two‑day visit to Northern Ireland, visiting Belfast, Fermanagh, and Ballymena. The visit highlighted the region's young people and acknowledged progress made in overcoming long‑standing divisions. In June, Catherine took the royal first salute at the Beating Retreat military pageant, a role traditionally performed by the Queen.

In October 2020, she and William met President Volodymyr Zelenskyy of Ukraine and his First Lady Olena Zelenska at Buckingham Palace, marking the first royal engagement there since the start of the COVID‑19 pandemic. Zelenskyy later expressed his appreciation for the couple's support for Ukraine and its people. In December, they embarked on a three‑day tour of England, Scotland, and Wales aboard the British Royal Train to recognise the work of individuals and organisations during the pandemic. The initiative received mixed political responses: Boris Johnson expressed support, while Scotland's First Minister Nicola Sturgeon criticised the tour in light of travel restrictions; all three devolved governments had been consulted during the planning.

Catherine and William attended the G7 summit for the first time in June 2021 in Cornwall. During the summit, Catherine met Jill Biden for the first time, and the pair visited Connor Downs Academy, where they spoke with students and took part in a roundtable discussion on early education.

=== Outside the United Kingdom ===
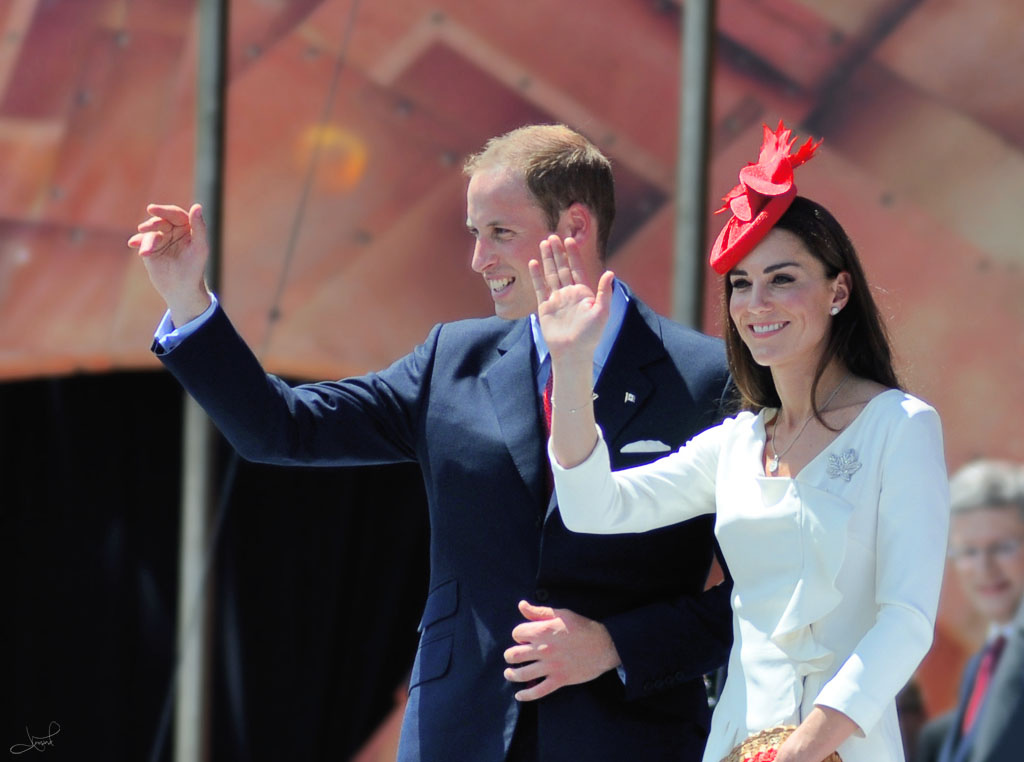
With William in Ottawa during their first royal tour of Canada, 2011

Catherine and William undertook their first royal tour of Canada in June–July 2011. The tour included a two-day visit to California, which also marked her first trip to the United States. Nicholas Witchell of BBC News described the tour as an "unqualified success", noting that the couple's relaxed manner – from tree planting to street hockey – charmed the public and strengthened support for the monarchy. In September 2012, they toured Singapore, Malaysia, Tuvalu, and the Solomon Islands as part of celebrations marking Elizabeth II's Diamond Jubilee across the Commonwealth. During the visit, Catherine delivered her first official speech abroad at a hospice in Malaysia, drawing on her experience as patron of East Anglia's Children's Hospices.

The couple, accompanied by their son, visited Australia and New Zealand in April 2014. Australia's prime minister, Tony Abbott, described the tour as "one of the very best royal visits" the country had hosted. In June, they travelled to France to attend commemorations marking the 70th anniversary of the Normandy landings at Gold Beach. Later that year, they visited the United States. The tour combined diplomatic engagements, including a visit to the National September 11 Memorial & Museum, with events reflecting their personal interests, such as attending an NBA match between the Brooklyn Nets and the Cleveland Cavaliers.

In October 2015, Catherine attended her first state banquet at Buckingham Palace, held in honour of Chinese president Xi Jinping. In April 2016, she and William undertook a tour of India and Bhutan. That October, she carried out her first solo overseas visit, travelling to the Netherlands. In 2017, the couple visited France, Poland, Germany, and Belgium. Their tour of Poland and Germany was widely regarded as successful, with author Katie Nicholl describing it as a "P.R. victory for Britain". Catherine also visited Luxembourg City in May 2017 for commemorations marking the Treaty of London. In January 2018, the couple visited Sweden and Norway. They travelled to Pakistan in October 2019, the first royal visit to the country in 13 years. The tour was a success, helping promote diplomatic relations with Pakistan while also reflecting the couple's personal interests in climate change and the significance of quality education. In March 2020, they carried out a three‑day visit to Ireland, travelling across three counties.

In February 2022, Catherine visited Denmark to learn about the country's approach to supporting the social and emotional development of young people and to mark milestones for both nations' monarchs. The following month, she and William toured Belize, The Bahamas, and Jamaica as part of celebrations for Elizabeth II's Platinum Jubilee. Public demonstrations during the visit brought renewed attention to calls for reparations for slavery.

== Princess of Wales ==
In September 2022, Catherine and William visited Anglesey and Swansea, marking their first visit to Wales since becoming Princess and Prince of Wales. Between November and December 2022, she accompanied William to Boston on their first official overseas tour as Prince and Princess of Wales and attended the second edition of the Earthshot Prize. In February 2023, they travelled to Falmouth, their first visit to Cornwall since assuming the titles of Duke and Duchess of Cornwall. In October 2023, the couple issued a public statement condemning the 7 October attacks on Israel. During the US state visit in September 2025, Catherine and First Lady Melania Trump presented badges and met Scouts from the Squirrels section at Frogmore Gardens, an interaction described by CNN as a "more humanising moment". In May 2026, she undertook a two-day visit to Reggio Emilia as part of her work on early childhood development. This marked her first official overseas visit since her cancer diagnosis in 2024. In September, she and William made their first official visit to the Isle of Bute and the town of Rothesay as Duke and Duchess of Rothesay. In November 2026, she accompanied William on a three-day visit to India, centred on the sixth Earthshot Prize awards ceremony in Mumbai. The visit marked their first joint overseas tour in more than three years. The Daily Telegraph described the tour as a success and a "springboard for more"; it was also called "particularly special" by Ian Patrick, William's private secretary.

== Charity work ==
=== Patronages ===
Catherine has been involved in charitable work since before her marriage and continues to support a wide range of causes. In 2007, she curated a photography exhibition to mark the launch of Time to Reflect by Alistair Morrison, raising funds for UNICEF. In 2008, she visited Naomi House Children's Hospice, spending time with children and staff. Later that year, she organised a 1980s-themed roller disco fundraiser that raised £100,000, divided between Oxford Children's Hospital and the mental-health charity Place2Be. While working for her parents' company, she organised events for the Starlight Children's Foundation, which supports seriously ill young people, and helped coordinate the Boodles Boxing Ball, which raised funds for the charity.

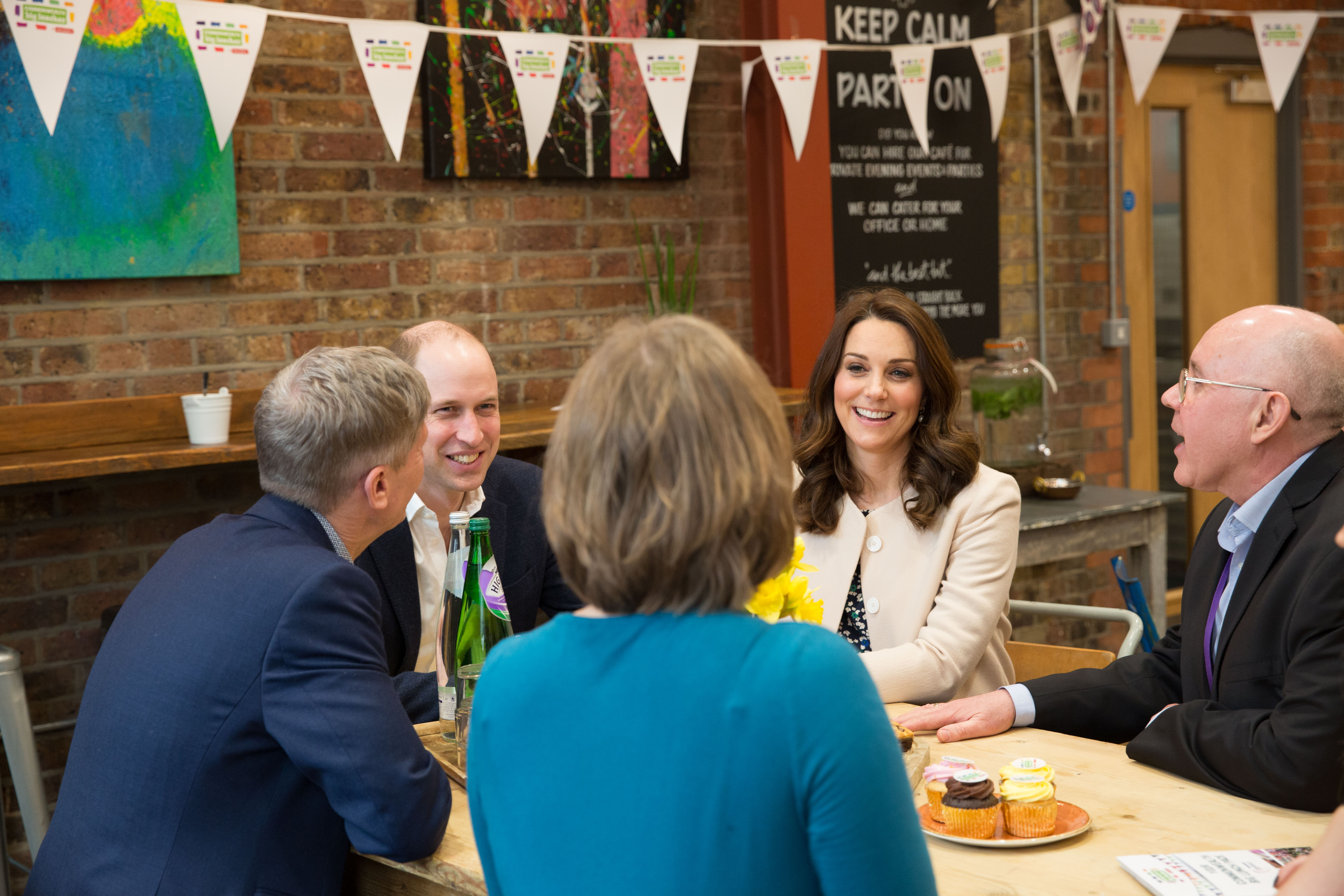
With William attending a Commonwealth Big Lunch at St Luke's Community Centre in Islington, March 2018

Following her marriage, Catherine assumed royal duties in support of the British monarch. In March 2011, she and William established a gift fund through The Foundation of Prince William and Prince Harry, enabling well‑wishers to donate to 26 selected charities in lieu of wedding gifts. The foundation was renamed in June 2012 to reflect Catherine's involvement, and became The Royal Foundation of The Prince and Princess of Wales in September 2022.

Catherine's charitable work focuses primarily on early childhood, mental health, sport, addiction, and the arts. Her influence on charitable fundraising and public engagement has been described as the "Kate effect". She holds a number of patronages. (Note: Among her patronages are Evelina London Children's Hospital, Family Action, the Natural History Museum, NHS Charities Together, SportsAid, the Scouts, the 1851 Trust, and the Victoria and Albert Museum.) Drawing on her background in art history, she selected The Art Room – an organisation that provided art therapy for disadvantaged children before its closure – as one of her early patronages, and also became patron of the National Portrait Gallery. She later assumed patronage of the Lawn Tennis Association, the All England Lawn Tennis and Croquet Club, Action for Children, and the Royal Photographic Society following their transfer from Queen Elizabeth II. In 2018, she became the first royal patron of the Victoria and Albert Museum and curated a small display for it in July 2025. In 2019, she became patron of the Foundling Museum, which commemorates the Foundling Hospital. Catherine also served as a local volunteer leader with The Scout Association in north Wales, before being appointed co-president in September 2020 alongside the Duke of Kent.

=== Sport ===
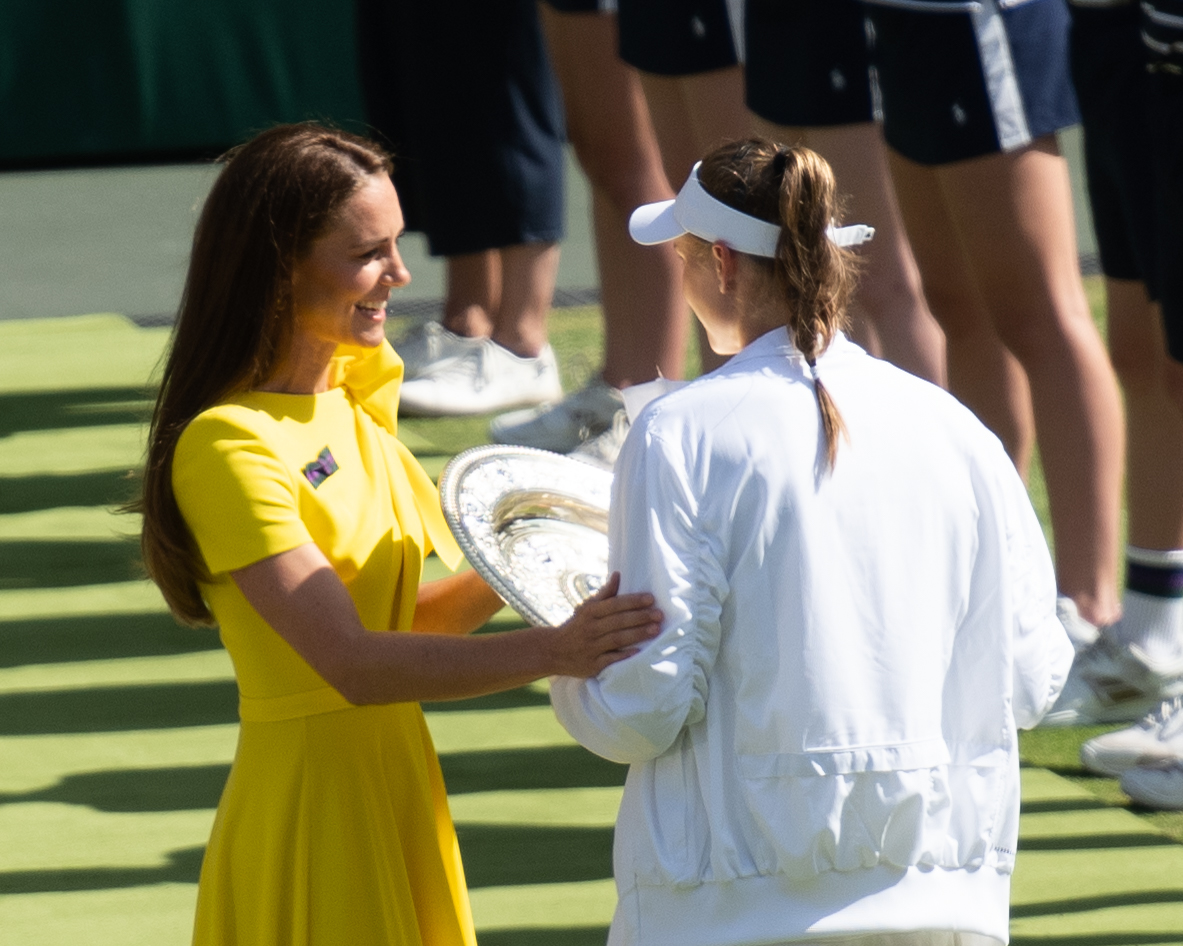
Presenting the ladies' singles trophy to Elena Rybakina at the 2022 Wimbledon Championships

Catherine is a keen sportswoman and attends Wimbledon annually. She has been patron of the All England Lawn Tennis and Croquet Club since 2016. An enthusiastic sailor, she has occasionally taken part in charity sailing events to raise funds for various causes. In 2012, she, William and his brother Harry launched Coach Core, a programme established after the 2012 Olympics to provide apprenticeships for young people aspiring to careers in sports coaching. In 2014, she and William were awarded Honorary Life Membership of the Marylebone Cricket Club. In July 2019, she supported Backyard Nature, a campaign encouraging children, families, and communities to engage with the natural world. In February 2022, she became patron of the Rugby Football Union and the Rugby Football League, roles previously held by Harry.

=== Military and armed forces ===
In 2014, Catherine wrote the foreword for Living in the Slipstream: Life as an RAF Wife, with proceeds supporting charity. In December 2015, she assumed patronage of the Royal Air Force Air Cadets, following the Duke of Edinburgh's 63‑year tenure. The handover took place during an audience at Buckingham Palace. She has since visited their base in Cambridgeshire and marked their 75th anniversary in 2016. In October 2022, she became patron of Preet Chandi, a British Army medical officer undertaking a 1,000‑mile solo expedition to the South Pole after completing a 700‑mile journey earlier that year.

=== Health and medical initiatives ===
As patron of Action on Addiction, Catherine has made visits to its centres, spending time with people in recovery. In October 2012, she helped launch the M‑PACT programme (Moving Parents and Children Together), one of the few UK initiatives addressing the impact of parental addiction on families. In June 2021, she became patron of The Forward Trust following its merger with Action on Addiction, and subsequently launched the "Taking Action on Addiction" campaign.

In January 2018, locks of Catherine's hair were reportedly donated anonymously to the Little Princess Trust, which provides wigs for children with cancer. The following month, she became patron of the Royal College of Obstetricians and Gynaecologists. She also launched Nursing Now, a three-year global campaign to raise the profile of nursing. Catherine has written about her family's nursing heritage: her grandmother, Valerie Middleton, and great-grandmother, Olive Middleton, both served as VAD nurses with the British Red Cross. During the COVID-19 pandemic, she undertook numerous in-person and virtual engagements supporting National Health Service workers and discreetly volunteered with the Royal Voluntary Service.

Catherine has worked extensively in children's palliative care through her patronage of East Anglia's Children's Hospices. She has supported Children's Hospice Week annually since 2013. In January 2025, she was announced as joint royal patron of the Royal Marsden Hospital alongside William, who has been its president since 2007. Later that month, she became patron of Tŷ Hafan, a children's hospice in Wales.

In June 2026, Catherine undertook the Three Peaks Challenge in support of the Royal Marsden Cancer Charity, with the funds raised helping to build the new specialist Centre for Holistic Wellbeing and Recovery. She subsequently made a personal donation to Molly Ollys Wishes, a charity that helps fulfil the wishes of children with life-threatening illnesses, supporting a fundraiser by an 11-year-old she met while climbing Ben Nevis. In November, it was announced that the challenge had been filmed for Heal, a BBC documentary about Catherine's experience of cancer and recovery, with distribution proceeds going to the Royal Marsden Cancer Charity.

=== Photography ===
Catherine describes herself as an "enthusiastic amateur photographer", and has taken official portraits of her children and other members of the royal family. In 2019, she supported workshops run by the Royal Photographic Society and Action for Children, highlighting photography's role in helping young people express their thoughts and experiences. As patron of the Royal Photographic Society, she contributed to an exhibition marking 75 years since the end of the Holocaust. Her portraits of Holocaust survivors were later displayed at the Imperial War Museum. She curated an exhibition of Victorian photography at the National Portrait Gallery with a thematic focus on childhood.

In May 2020, she launched "Hold Still", a project documenting life during the COVID-19 lockdown, which received 31,000 submissions. In October, selected portraits were displayed across 112 public sites in 80 towns and cities. The images were later published in the book Hold Still: A Portrait of Our Nation in 2020, with a foreword written by Catherine, on 7 May 2021.

=== Community causes ===
Since December 2021, Catherine has hosted the annual Together at Christmas carol service at Westminster Abbey, with each year's event centred on a different theme. In March 2022, during the Russian invasion of Ukraine, she and William made a donation to support refugees. They donated again in February 2023 to the Disasters Emergency Committee (DEC) following the 2023 Turkey–Syria earthquake, and in July 2024 to support communities affected by Hurricane Beryl.

=== Environmental causes ===
Catherine has emphasised the importance of environmental sustainability and the benefits of spending time in nature. In 2019, she designed the "Back to Nature Garden" with the landscape architects Andree Davies and Adam White. The garden was later expanded and displayed at Hampton Court Palace as a part of the Hampton Court Palace Flower Show, before being shown at the Back to Nature Festival at RHS Garden Wisley. A playground inspired by the garden opened on the Sandringham Estate in 2021. In May 2023, Catherine hosted the first children's picnic at the Chelsea Flower Show for pupils from ten primary schools participating in the Royal Horticultural Society's Campaign for School Gardening.

=== Mental health advocacy ===
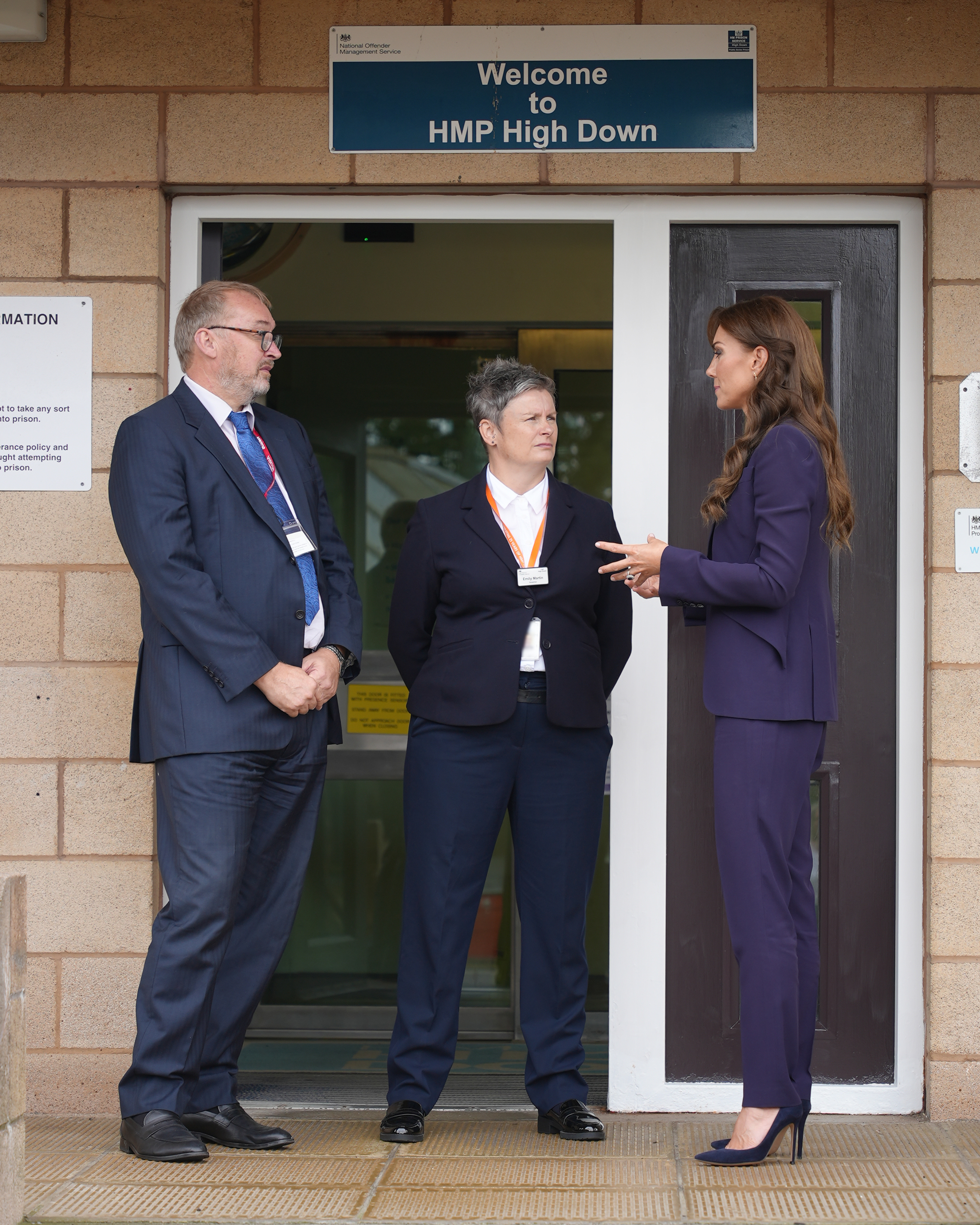
At HM Prison High Down, September 2023

Catherine has addressed issues surrounding mental health and disability, and has visited charities and hospitals such as St Thomas' Hospital and the Maurice Wohl Clinical Neuroscience Institute to meet mothers and children affected by these challenges. She has been credited with raising national awareness of children's mental health; Benita Refson, president of Place2Be, said she would "shine the spotlight on child mental health", while Peter Fonagy, CEO of the Anna Freud Centre, described her as one of the most important figures in the field and stated that "to the millions of children who have been suffering in silence, she is their voice". In recognition of their work with charities focused on children's mental health, Catherine and William received the Gold Blue Peter badge, an award previously granted to Queen Elizabeth II. To encourage people to speak openly about mental health, Catherine, William, and Harry launched the Heads Together campaign in April 2016. She later spoke publicly about her own experiences of motherhood, noting periods of "lack of confidence" and "feelings of ignorance".

Catherine has discussed her experiences of "mum guilt" in balancing work and family life, and described bringing her newborn home from hospital for the first time as "terrifying". She has highlighted the importance of "a happy home" and "a safe environment" for children, and has spoken of her "passion" for the outdoors as a foundation for childhood wellbeing and development. She launched the Mentally Healthy Schools website, which provides resources for staff and pupils to support mental health. After two years, the site had been accessed by more than 250,000 visitors. Catherine also guest-edited HuffPost UK to raise awareness of children's mental health issues.

In 2019, Catherine worked with the Royal Horticultural Society as one of the co‑designers of a garden display at the Chelsea Flower Show. In May that year, as part of the Heads Together initiative, Catherine, William, and other members of the family launched Shout, a text‑messaging service for people experiencing mental‑health difficulties. In March 2020, she and William supported a new mental‑health initiative by Public Health England during the COVID-19 pandemic. In April 2020, they announced Our Frontline, which provides mental‑health support for emergency and frontline workers.

Catherine made a surprise appearance on CBeebies Bedtime Stories in February 2022, reading The Owl Who Was Afraid of the Dark by Jill Tomlinson to mark the end of Children's Mental Health Week. In May that year, she became patron of the Maternal Mental Health Alliance. In October, to mark World Mental Health Day, she and William presented a special edition of Newsbeat, interviewing four guests on mental‑health topics. The following year, they took part in a youth forum in Birmingham, Exploring our Emotional Worlds, alongside BBC Radio 1 and The Mix, continuing their longstanding work on mental wellbeing. In December 2024, they announced joint funding for a pilot scheme with Norfolk and Waveney Mind to support rural and farming communities on the Sandringham estate.

In May 2025, Catherine launched the Mother Nature video series to highlight nature's role in mental wellbeing; it concluded with Winter in January 2026. The Daily Telegraph described it as "one of her most personally creative projects to date".

=== Early years and childhood development ===
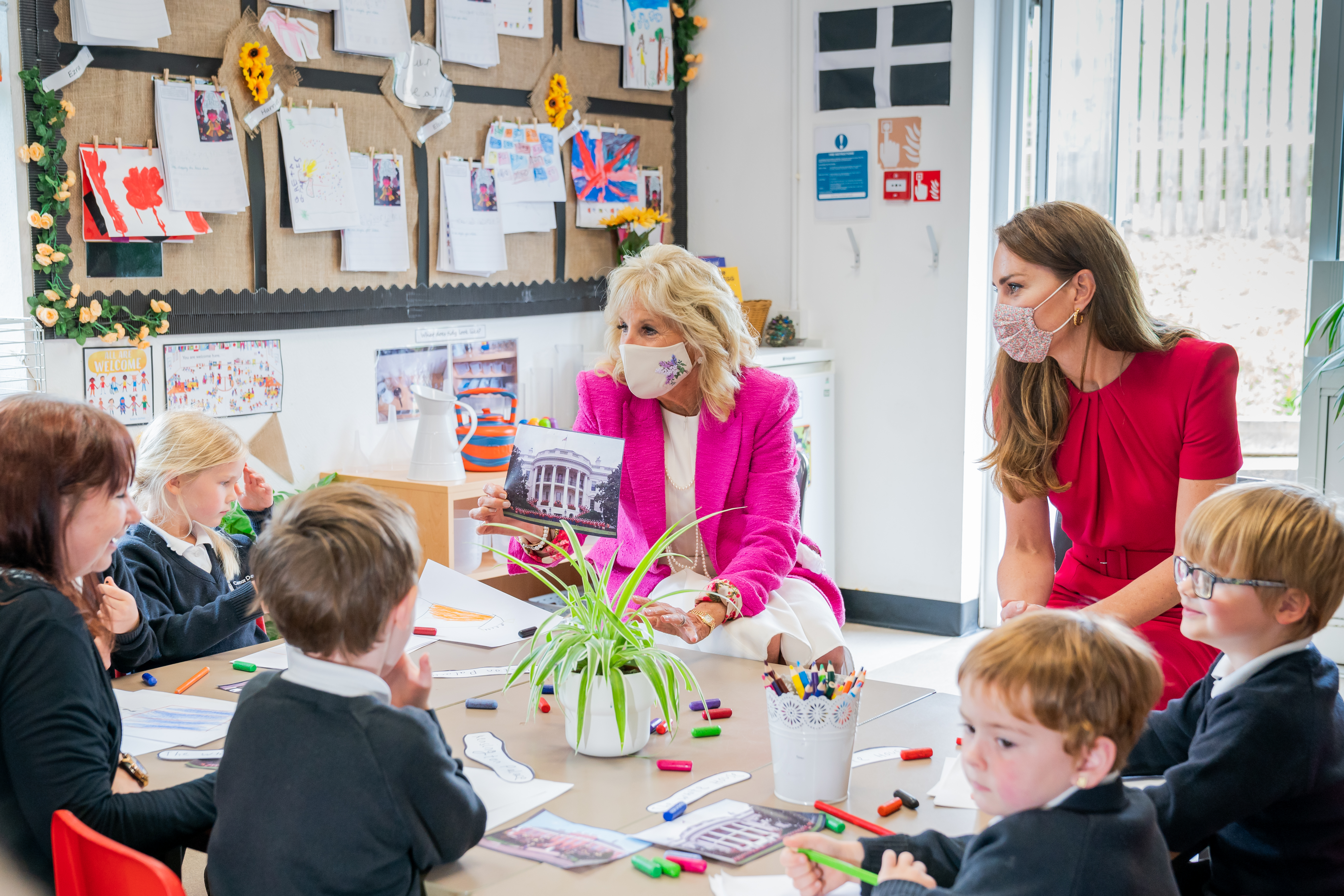
With Jill Biden at Connor Downs Academy, Cornwall, June 2021

During the initial years of her charity work, Catherine became interested in the connection between the first five years of childhood and later outcomes such as homelessness, mental illness, and addiction. In March 2018, she hosted a symposium with the Royal Society of Medicine on children's health and launched the Early Years Intervention Support initiative. In May that year, she established the Early Years Steering Group. In January 2020, Catherine launched 5 Big Questions on the Under 5's, a nationwide survey on early childhood development. The survey was conducted by Ipsos MORI and included "further qualitative and ethnographic research" on the early years. It received more than 500,000 responses. The results were released in November 2020, outlining five key themes in early childhood, including parental mental health and wider community support. In July 2020, she supported the development of the BBC's Tiny Happy People initiative, which provides free digital resources for parents with young children. In August 2020, she led a donation drive to support baby banks nationwide, generating more than 10,000 donations. In June 2021, Catherine launched the Royal Foundation Centre for Early Childhood to coordinate research, campaigns, and partnerships on early‑years issues.

In February 2022, Catherine visited Denmark on behalf of the Royal Foundation Centre for Early Childhood. In June that year, she hosted her first roundtable discussion with politicians on early‑childhood development. In January 2023, she launched the Shaping Us initiative through the Royal Foundation Centre for Early Childhood, a long‑term campaign aimed at raising awareness of early‑childhood development and its importance. In November that year, she delivered the keynote speech at the Shaping Us National Symposium at the Design Museum in London. In October 2025, Catherine co‑authored an essay with Professor Robert J. Waldinger of Harvard Medical School, encouraging parents to limit children's screen time to support early‑childhood relationships.

== Public image ==
=== Fashion ===
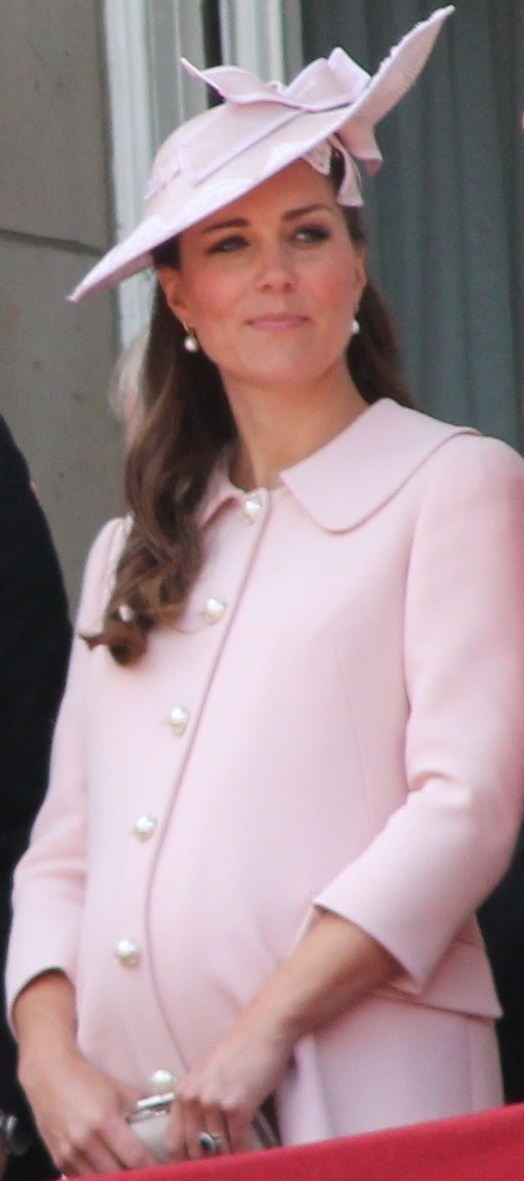
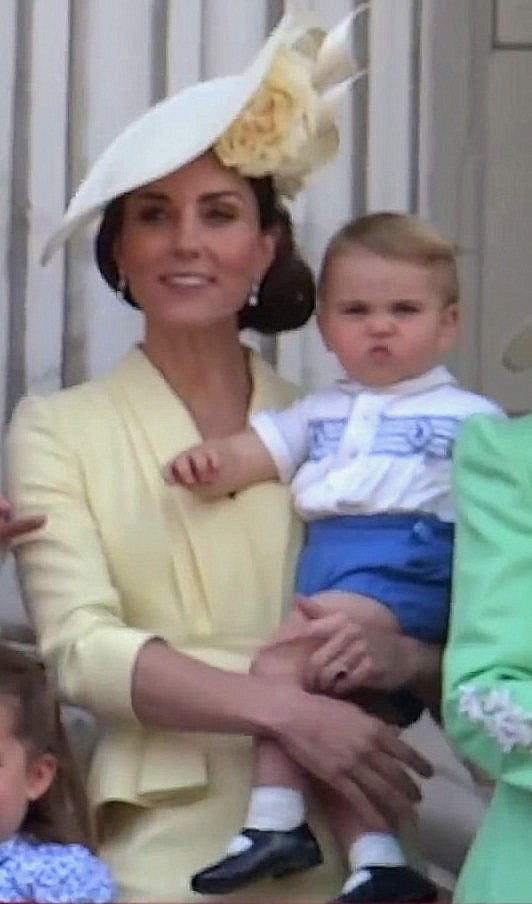
Catherine (holding Prince Louis at right) wore dresses designed by Alexander McQueen at Trooping the Colour in 2013 and 2019 respectively.

Catherine, noted for her fashion sense, has been included on numerous "best‑dressed" lists. She appeared on the cover of British Vogue's centenary issue in June 2016, and the magazine later named her an "Eternal Influencer" and one of the 50 best‑dressed Britons in 2025. Her style has developed from the more conservative choices of her early public life into a sophisticated and elegant wardrobe, frequently featuring designs by Alexander McQueen, Jenny Packham, and Catherine Walker, as well as international houses such as Dolce & Gabbana and Gucci. The "Kate Middleton effect" refers to the reported impact she has on the sales of particular products and brands. In 2021, she was reported to have boosted the British fashion industry by up to £1 billion within a year.

=== Public opinion and influence ===
Commentators have described Catherine as a significant asset to the royal family's public image. Camilla Tominey of The Daily Telegraph characterised her as "the monarchy's greatest asset", while Petronella Wyatt of the same paper called her "the jewel in the crown". Rhonda Garelick of The New York Times noted her ability to balance modernity with traditional royal expectations. On Catherine's 40th birthday, aides told The Times that she avoids PR advice and "will never do something because she thinks the media will like it". Jamie Lowther-Pinkerton, her and William's former private secretary, said she has "an almost old-fashioned, Queen Mother attitude to drama – she just doesn't do it." The Times also described her as influential, observing that, like Queen Elizabeth II and Prince Philip, and King Charles III and Queen Camilla, she and William form "a good double act."

Time magazine listed Catherine among the 100 most influential people in the world in 2011, 2012, and 2013. She was a runner-up for the magazine's Person of the Year award in 2011 and 2024. From 2023 to 2026, The Independent included her on its "Influence List". In December 2022, she was found to be the second most liked member of the royal family by the polling company YouGov, while an Ipsos favourability poll in April 2023 ranked her first. In April 2024, YouGov again ranked her as the most popular royal. That year, she was the most searched person on Google Search in the United Kingdom and the second most searched globally.

In May 2025, Catherine was named to the Time 100 Health list for her cancer-awareness work. That same month, she and William were included on the inaugural Time 100 Philanthropy list. The Royal Horticultural Society launched a rose named Catherine's Rose, bred by Harkness Roses, in her honour to support the Royal Marsden Hospital. In June, she and William topped Tatler's social power index.

== Privacy and the media ==
The death of Diana, Princess of Wales, while being pursued by paparazzi in 1997, has shaped Catherine and William's cautious approach to the media. They have repeatedly requested privacy when off duty.

In April 2004, The Sun published photographs of Middleton and William at a ski resort, identifying her as his girlfriend. After her graduation, she was frequently targeted by paparazzi and raised concerns about harassment and intrusive media presence outside her home. Between 2005 and 2006, Middleton's phone was reportedly hacked 155 times by the News of the World, according to its former royal editor, Clive Goodman, during a wider phone-hacking scandal involving the royal family. In 2006, her lawyers issued further warnings following the publication of unauthorised photographs taken during a shopping trip. In January 2007, heightened media attention around Middleton's 25th birthday prompted legal warnings from William, Charles, and her lawyers over press harassment. Some newspapers subsequently agreed to stop using paparazzi images. In March, a complaint to the Press Complaints Commission (PCC) regarding a photograph obtained through harassment resulted in a settlement and formal warning. In July, MPs criticised the PCC for failing to protect her from what they described as "persistent harassment".

In 2010, Middleton pursued a privacy claim against two agencies and the photographer Niraj Tanna over tennis photographs taken during Christmas 2009. The case concluded with £5,000 in damages, legal costs, and an apology. In 2011, close associates of the private investigator Jonathan Rees alleged that he had targeted Middleton during her relationship with William. In May 2011, the Middleton family complained to the PCC after photographs of Catherine and her family in swimwear during a 2006 holiday were published in several newspapers. The family argued that the images breached privacy and the editors' code of practice. In September, an agreement was reached for the photographs to be removed from the newspapers' websites and not republished. In September 2012, the French edition of Closer, the Italian magazine Chi, and the Irish Daily Star published topless photographs of Catherine sunbathing at Château d'Autet. She and William filed a criminal complaint and civil suit in Nanterre. A court granted an injunction preventing further publication and opened a criminal inquiry. In 2017, Closer was fined €100,000, and its editor and owner were each fined €45,000.

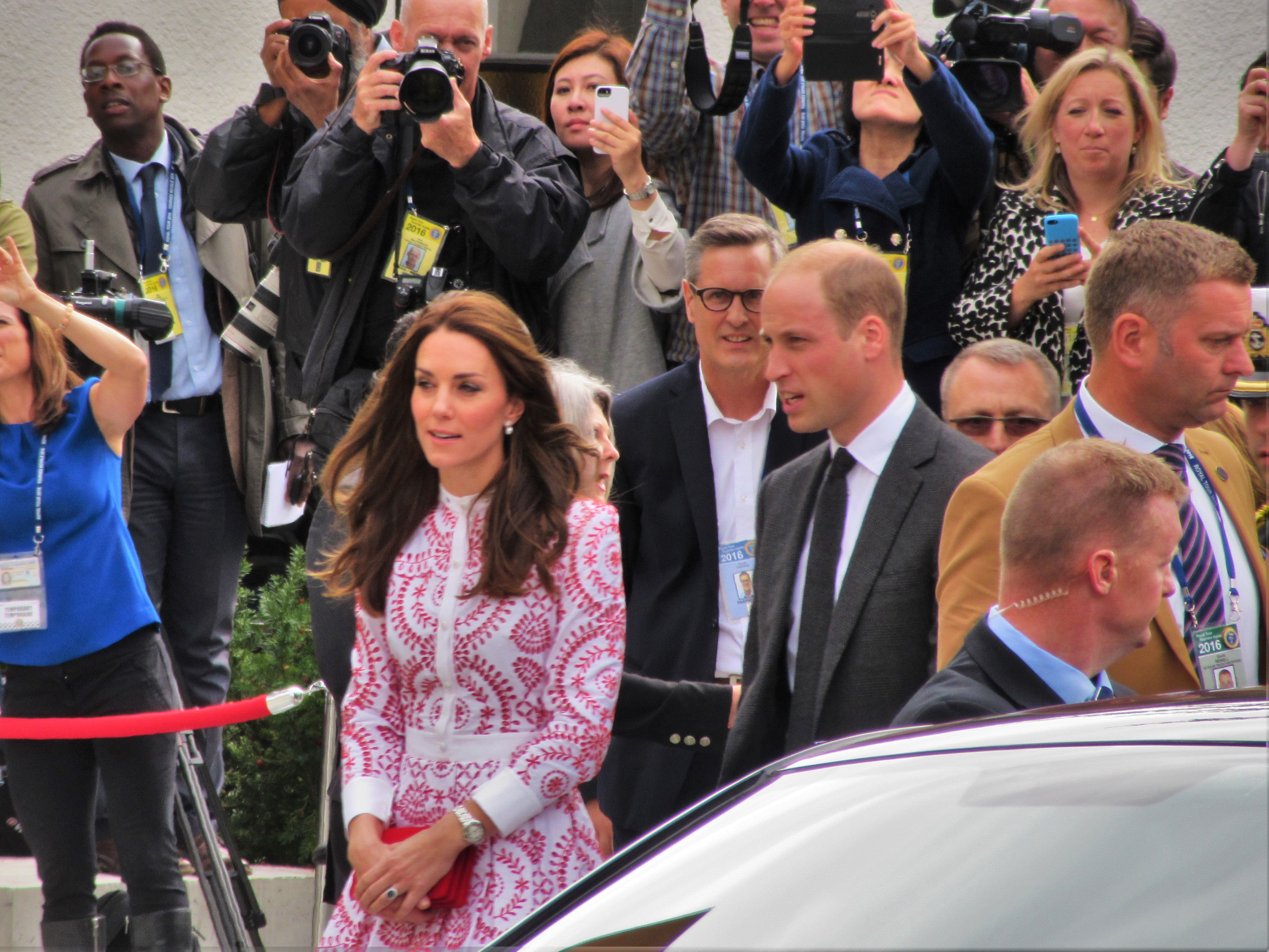
With William being photographed by members of the press during their 2016 royal tour of Canada

In December 2012, Australian radio hosts Michael Christian and Mel Greig impersonated Elizabeth II and Charles in a call to King Edward VII's Hospital, where Catherine was being treated for hyperemesis gravidarum. They obtained information from a nurse on her ward. Following public criticism and an internal inquiry, Jacintha Saldanha, the nurse who transferred the call, died by suicide. The hosts later apologised. In February 2013, Chi published photographs of Catherine's exposed pregnant belly, taken during a holiday on the private island of Mustique. The British press declined to publish them.

In October 2014, Catherine and William issued a legal warning to a freelance photographer for "harassing and following" their son George and his nanny. In August 2015, Kensington Palace released a letter describing the media's dangerous attempts to photograph George and Charlotte. In March 2019, the royal family issued social-media guidelines following online abuse directed at Catherine and her sister-in-law, Meghan. In May 2020, Kensington Palace criticised a Tatler article about Catherine as inaccurate, leading the magazine to amend its online version after legal pressure.

In March 2024, the Associated Press, AFP, Reuters, and Getty Images withdrew a Mother's Day photograph of Catherine and her children due to concerns about digital manipulation. Catherine later acknowledged editing the image and apologised for the confusion. The incident occurred shortly before she disclosed her cancer diagnosis and treatment. Later that month, the London Clinic launched an investigation after reports that staff had attempted to access her private medical records. At the conclusion of an investigation by the Information Commissioner's Office in June 2026, a former healthcare worker was cautioned after attempting to access and sell Catherine's medical information. In October 2025, Harry named Catherine and William in his court case against Associated Newspapers, alleging that private investigators had previously been employed to collect information on them, including Catherine's mobile-phone number and other personal details. Later that month, she and William won a privacy case in France against Paris Match over unauthorised photographs taken during a family ski trip in the Alps.

== Titles, styles, and honours ==
=== Titles and styles ===
Upon her marriage in April 2011, Catherine became a Princess of the United Kingdom, as well as Duchess of Cambridge, Countess of Strathearn, and Baroness Carrickfergus; she also received the style of Royal Highness. She was formally known as "Her Royal Highness The Duchess of Cambridge", except in Scotland, where she was instead called "Her Royal Highness The Countess of Strathearn".

Queen Elizabeth II died on 8 September 2022, and Catherine's father-in-law succeeded as Charles III. Catherine became Duchess of Cornwall and Duchess of Rothesay. She was therefore briefly referred to as "Her Royal Highness The Duchess of Cornwall and Cambridge". On 9 September 2022, the King announced William's appointment as Prince of Wales and Earl of Chester, thereby making Catherine Princess of Wales and Countess of Chester. She has since been known as "Her Royal Highness The Princess of Wales", and as "Her Royal Highness The Duchess of Rothesay" in Scotland.

=== Honours ===
Catherine is a Dame Grand Cross of the Royal Victorian Order (GCVO), a Royal Companion of the Order of the Companions of Honour (CH), and a recipient of the Royal Family Order of Elizabeth II and the Royal Family Order of Charles III.

== Ancestry ==
Catherine's father, Michael, is the son of Peter Middleton, whose Middleton forebears were from Leeds, West Yorkshire. The historian Robert Lacey describes Michael Middleton as having aristocratic kinship; his grandmother Olive Christiana Middleton was close to her second cousin Baroness Airedale (1868–1942). Both Catherine's paternal great-grandmother Olive Middleton (née Lupton) and her first cousin once removed Baroness von Schunck (née Kate Lupton) grew up at Potternewton Hall Estate, the seat of the Lupton family, who were described as landed gentry and, as such, were invited to the coronation of King George V and Queen Mary in 1911. Four successive generations of Catherine's ancestors lived at Potternewton Hall Estate: her great-grandmother Olive Middleton; Olive's father, the politician Francis Martineau Lupton; his mother, the educator Frances Elizabeth Lupton; and her father, the epidemiologist and surgeon Thomas Michael Greenhow. Other paternal ancestors include Sir Thomas Fairfax and his wife Anne Gascoigne, who was a descendant of Edward III.

Catherine's maternal ancestors, the Harrisons, were working-class labourers and miners from Sunderland and County Durham who worked in the pits owned by the Bowes-Lyon family. Ancestors through her maternal line include Sir Thomas Conyers, 9th Baronet, who was a descendant of Edward IV through his illegitimate daughter Elizabeth Plantagenet.

== Bibliography ==
=== Book contributions ===
- "Foreword", in: Bairstow, Alison; Black, Jill; Jeffers, Holly (2014). Living in the Slipstream: Life as an RAF Wife. Book Guild. ISBN 978-1-909716-24-7. Archived from the original on 3 December 2021.
- "Foreword", in: National Portrait Gallery (2021). Hold Still: A Portrait of Our Nation in 2020. National Portrait Gallery Publications. ISBN 978-1-85514-738-6.
- "Foreword", in: GCHQ (2022). Puzzles for Spies. National Geographic Books. ISBN 978-0-241-57990-9.

=== Authored articles and letters ===
- "Let's Make a Real Difference for an Entire Generation of Young Children". HuffPost (UK ed.). 17 February 2016. Archived from the original on 29 November 2023.
- "An Open Letter from The Duchess of Cambridge to Midwives". The Royal Family. 27 December 2019. Archived from the original on 15 January 2024.
- With First Lady Jill Biden (12 June 2021). "This is what our kids deserve". CNN. Archived from the original on 3 November 2023.
- "I'm determined to nurture our children in their first crucial years of life. They are our future". The Daily Telegraph. 25 November 2022. Archived from the original on 21 March 2023.
- "An open letter from The Princess of Wales". The Royal Foundation Centre for Early Childhood. 28 January 2023. Archived from the original on 2 February 2023.
- "Investing in early childhood is a down payment on all our futures". Financial Times. 24 March 2023. Archived from the original on 16 August 2023.
- "A Message from The Princess of Wales this Addiction Awareness Week". Action On Addiction. 3 November 2023. Archived from the original on 20 January 2024.
- "The Shaping Us Framework: Foreword" (PDF). The Royal Foundation Centre for Early Childhood. 2 February 2025. Archived (PDF) from the original on 3 February 2025.
- "The Power of Human Connection in a Distracted World". The Royal Foundation Centre for Early Childhood. 9 October 2025. Archived from the original on 9 October 2025. (Note: Co-authored with Professor Robert J. Waldinger)
- "Message of support for Addiction Awareness Week from our Patron, HRH The Princess of Wales". Action On Addiction. 23 November 2025. Archived from the original on 24 November 2025.
- "Creating the conditions for love to flourish through nature & creativity". The Royal Foundation Centre for Early Childhood. 19 June 2026. Archived from the original on 19 June 2026.

== Notes ==
Honorary titles
Preceded by The Duke of Edinburgh as Air Commodore-in-Chief	Air Commandant of the Air Training Corps; 2015–present	Incumbent
Preceded by The Prince of Wales	Colonel of the Irish Guards; 2022–present	Incumbent
Orders of precedence in the United Kingdom
Preceded by The Queen	Ladies; HRH The Princess of Wales	Followed by The Duchess of Sussex
