= Rosa 'Catherine's Rose' =

Rose cultivar

Rosa Catherine's Rose
- Genus: Rosa
- Cultivar group: Floribunda
- Marketing names: 'Harzenith'
- Breeder: Harkness, 2025

Rosa 'Catherine's Rose' is a coral-pink floribunda rose cultivar. It was developed by Harkness Roses. The rose was introduced in May 2025 by the Royal Horticultural Society and named in honour of Catherine, Princess of Wales, for her role in highlighting the healing power of nature. The rose is described as having subtle coral-pink blooms and a strong fragrance that is a mix of Turkish delight and mango. The flowers reach an average diameter of 8–12 centimetres (3.1–4.7 in), while the shrub gives rise to 15 blooms and reaches a height of 120 centimetres (47 in) at a width of 90 centimetres (35 in).

Proceeds from the sale of the rose will go to the Cancer Charity of the Royal Marsden Hospital, where Catherine received her treatment for cancer. The funds will help the Royal Marsden NHS Foundation Trust establish a training programme for clinical teams that focuses on prehabilitation and rehabilitation for cancer patients, both during and after their treatment.
