= East Anglia's Children's Hospices =

Charity and hospice in East Anglia

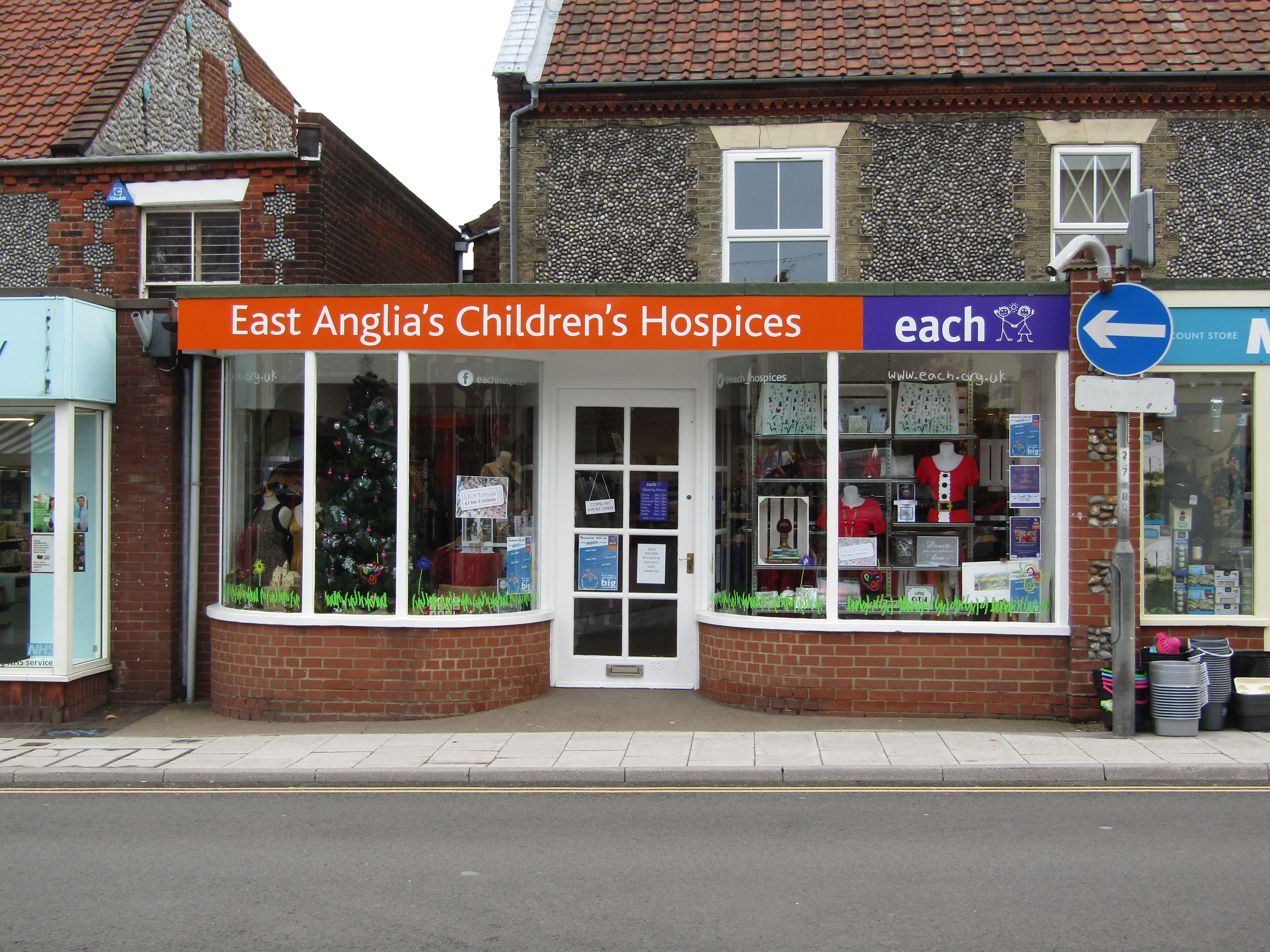
- An EACH charity shop in Sheringham
- Abbreviation: EACH
- Formation: 1989
- Region served: East Anglia
- Volunteers: 2000
- Website: each.org.uk

East Anglia's Children's Hospices (EACH) is a children's hospice charity operating across East Anglia (Cambridgeshire, Essex, Norfolk and Suffolk). EACH provides support for children and young people with life-limiting conditions. Founded in 1989 by Diana, Princess of Wales, the charity runs 2000 volunteers across its 58 charity shops in East Anglia and three hospices in Cambridge (Milton), Ipswich (the Treehouse) and Norwich (the Nook). Notable patrons include Catherine, Princess of Wales, where she made her first public speech as a member of the royal family in 2012, and singer Ed Sheeran, who became an ambassador since 2014.

== History ==
EACH was founded in 1989 by Diana, Princess of Wales, when she opened the hospice in Milton (near Cambridge). A second hospice opened in Quidenham (close to Norwich) in 1991. One notable patron of the charity is Catherine, Princess of Wales. It was also the place when she (then the Duchess of Cambridge) made her first public speech as a member of the royal family in 2012, shortly after she became a patron, when she announced the official opening of the Treehouse hospice in Ipswich. Other notable patrons have include singer Ed Sheeran, where he became an EACH ambassador in 2014 and opened a Saxmundham charity shop in 2017. The Duchess of Cambridge also opened the Nook hospice near Norwich in 2019, replacing the one in Quidenham that opened in 1991.

== Funding ==
85 percent of the charity is funded through donations and sales and the rest is from the government. EACH has over 2000 volunteers across its 58 stores. As of February 2025, EACH had 448 children and young people in care. The Nook hospice and one of its staff has been shortlisted for the Student Nursing Times Awards in two categories in March 2026.
