= Rhonda Garelick =

American author and academic

Rhonda K. Garelick is an American professor and author. She was formerly a professor of English with a special joint appointment in the Hixson-Lied College of Fine and Performing Arts. She is the founder and director of the Interdisciplinary Arts Symposium based in the Hixson-Lied College. At present, she is the founding director of the Interdisciplinary Institute for Public Humanities at Hofstra University, where she is also the John Cranford Adams Distinguished Professor of Literature. She is a scholar of performance, fashion, literature, visual arts, and cultural politics.

== Biography ==
She received her doctorate, masters, and bachelor's degrees in French and comparative literature from Yale University, doing graduate work at the University of Paris/VII afterwards. She has spent several years as a research strategy consultant to industries including but not limited to, fashion, television, and journalism. She has taught at Yale University, University of Colorado Boulder, Columbia University, Connecticut College, and the University of Nebraska–Lincoln.

She is the author of the novel Mademoiselle: Coco Chanel and the Pulse of History, published in 2014. She was the 2010 winner for publication design from the American Alliance of Museums for her book Fabulous Harlequin: ORLAN and the Patchwork Self, which was also named a 2011 Book of Critical Interest by Critical Inquiry. She also co-edited a special, double issue of Southwest Review, entitled "Performance as Style/Style as Performance", which was named a "Notable Special Issue" in The Best American Essays. Her pieces have been in the New York Times, New York Newsday, the International Herald Tribune, and the Sydney Morning Herald, as well as several literary journals, critical anthologies, and museum catalogs.

She has received rewards from the National Endowment for the Humanities, The Whiting Foundation, The Getty Research Institute, The American Council of Learned Societies, The Dedalus Foundation, The American Association of University Women, and the French Government. In 2006 she received a Guggenheim Foundation Fellowship.

Garelick's literary piece, Electric Salome: Love Fuller's Performance of Modernism, which was published by Princeton University Press in 2007, was deemed a "vibrant and scholarly text" which examines Loie Fuller's contribution to the development of modernist dance and drama performance at the beginning of the twentieth century. Garelick examines the profession of Fuller, who was an untrained American dancer with a background in cabaret and burlesque. Love established a unique career in dance in Paris, which she retained for approximately three decades, from 1892 to her death in 1928. Garelick closely examined and published the extraordinary life and works of Fuller, including her lively life, and her ability to live openly as a lesbian in Paris. She showed persuasive skill in placing Fuller in a range of contemporary contextual standards. Garelick incorporated this by highlighting Fuller's immersion into the study of new, imaginative lighting designs and projections, which brought her into close contact with modern innovations, specifically in medical science, cinema, and the use of phosphorescent lighting. Loie quickly absorbed an electric range of innovations and used them in her stagecraft. To exemplify, Garelick writes "When [Thomas] Edison placed her hand inside the machine [a fluoroscope] she was thrilled to see her flesh turn translucent, to see her body's solidity dissolve. She imagined at once a theatrical application"(39). Throughout the book, Garelick calls Fuller's actions "disingenuous" due to her statements and methods conflicting with her behaviors. Despite this, Fuller always vowed her carefully crafted stage creations were based on good fortune. She also continuously insisted her findings were accidental in nature. Fuller spent much time exploring human nature, sexual drives, the relationship between illusion and reality, and the transformation of the body through mechanized means.

== Publications ==
- Garelick, Rhonda K. (1998). Rising Star: Dandyism, Gender, and Performance in the Fin de siècle. Princeton University Press. ISBN 0-691-01205-9. OCLC 36961112.
- Garelick, Rhonda K. (2007). Electric Salome: Loie Fuller's Performance of Modernism. Princeton University Press. ISBN 978-1-4008-3277-4. JSTOR j.ctt1hfqzzr. OCLC 963845230.
- Garelick, Rhonda K. (2015). Mademoiselle: Coco Chanel and the Pulse of History. Random House. ISBN 978-1-4000-6952-1. OCLC 868199582.
- Garelick, Rhonda. "Forever Twiggy: The face of London in the 1960s is living her best life at the age of 77". The New York Times, September 16, 2026, updated September 17, 2026.
