= Nigel Playfair =

English actor-manager (1874–1934)

Playfair in 1922

Sir Nigel Ross Playfair (1 July 1874 – 19 August 1934) was an English actor and director, known particularly as actor-manager of the Lyric Theatre, Hammersmith, in the 1920s.

After acting as an amateur while practising as a lawyer, he turned professional in 1902 when he was 28. After a time in F. R. Benson's company he made steady professional progress as an actor, but the major change in his career came in 1918, when he became managing director of the Lyric, a run-down theatre on the fringe of central London. He transformed the theatre's fortunes, with a mix of popular musical shows and classic comedies, some in radically innovative productions, which divided opinion at the time but which have subsequently been seen as introducing a modern style of staging.

== Life ==
=== Family background ===
Playfair was born in the parish of St George Hanover Square, Westminster, on 1 July 1874, the younger son of the five children of the obstetric physician William Smoult Playfair (1835–1903), and his wife, Emily, née Kitson (1841–1916). The Oxford Dictionary of National Biography says that the doctor is notable nowadays for "his unintended contribution to medical ethics" by breaching the confidentiality of one of his patients, and for popularising the Weir Mitchell "rest-cure", a treatment criticised by Charlotte Perkin Gilman in The Yellow Wallpaper. Nigel Playfair's paternal uncles included Lyon Playfair, 1st Baron Playfair, scientist and politician, and Lambert Playfair, soldier, diplomat and naturalist. His maternal uncle was James Kitson, 1st Baron Airedale, industrialist and politician, named after his father, Nigel's grandfather, James Kitson, the pioneering railway engineer. Nigel's cousin was Robert Hawthorn Kitson, a painter who settled in Taormina, Sicily.

=== Early years ===
He was educated at Winchester, Harrow, and University College, Oxford, where he took a third-class honours degree in modern history (1896). At university he was a member of the Oxford University Dramatic Society. Destined for a career as a lawyer he was called to the bar by the Inner Temple in 1900, performing in his spare time with two well-known amateur societies, the Old Stagers and the Windsor Strollers, before giving up the law for the stage.

Playfair's first professional appearance was in Arthur Bourchier's company at the Garrick Theatre, London, in July 1902, playing Mr Melrose in a curtain-raiser, A Pair of Knickerbockers. In 1903 he played his first professional Shakespeare role, Dr Caius in Herbert Beerbohm Tree's production of The Merry Wives of Windsor at His Majesty's Theatre. At the same time his first play, a one-act piece called Amelia was staged as a curtain-raiser at the Garrick. The Era called it "a satire on cheap gentility which would have delighted Thackeray.

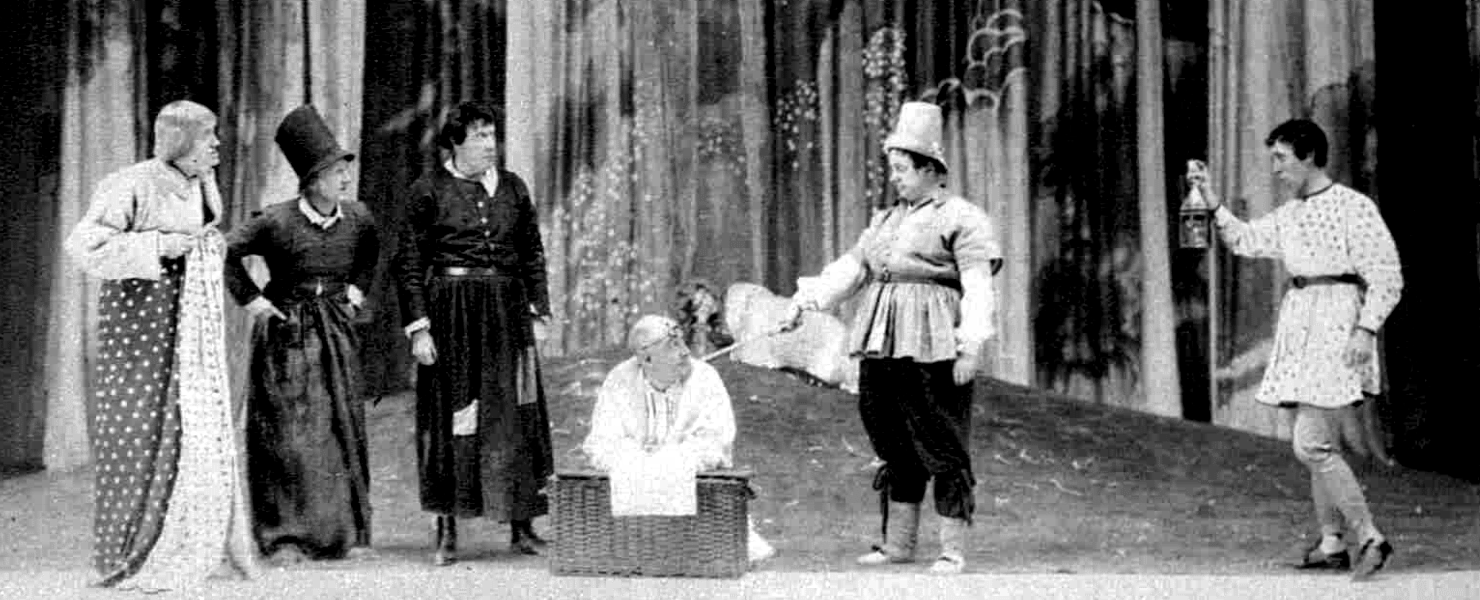
Playfair, second from right, as Bottom, 1914. (Note: The other players are, left to right, Leon Quartermaine (Flute), H. O. Nicholson (Starveling), Stratton Rodney (Snout), Arthur Whitby (Quince) and Nevile Gartside (Snug))

Playfair joined F. R. Benson's company touring in the West Indies, chiefly in comic Shakespearian parts. Back in London, in 1904, he first played his favourite role, Ralph, in The Knight of the Burning Pestle, and created the role of Hodson in Bernard Shaw's John Bull's Other Island at the Court Theatre.

In 1905 he married the actress Annie Mabel Platts (1875–1948), the daughter of a senior officer in the Indian Imperial Police; her stage name was May Martyn. They had three sons.

In 1907 at His Majesty's, Playfair played Stephano in The Tempest, Clown in The Winter's Tale and First Gravedigger in Hamlet, and in 1910 at the same theatre played the Host in The Merry Wives of Windsor. His roles between then and the First World War included Flawner Bannel in Fanny's First Play (1911), Steward in The Winter's Tale (1912), Sir Benjamin Backbite in The School for Scandal (1913) and Bottom in A Midsummer Night's Dream (1914). During the war he appeared in light plays, fashionable at that time.

=== Lyric, Hammersmith ===
in 1918 the author Arnold Bennett, who had been active in the theatre before the war, resumed his theatrical interest. He became chairman, with Playfair as managing director, of the Lyric Theatre, Hammersmith. A biographer of Playfair writes that the Lyric was "a derelict playhouse in what was then little more than a slum … this theatre seemed the last place in the world where high-class entertainment could possibly succeed". But the theatre prospered. Among the productions were Abraham Lincoln by John Drinkwater, and The Beggar's Opera, which, in Frank Swinnerton's phrase, "caught different moods of the post-war spirit", and ran for 466 and 1,463 performances respectively. In The Oxford Companion to the Theatre (1967) Phyllis Hartnoll comments that the Lyric became "one of the most popular and stimulating centres of theatrical activity".

Playfair, left, as Bob Acres in The Rivals (1925), with Douglas Burbidge as Jack Absolute

In 1920 Playfair returned to the role of Ralph in The Knight of the Burning Pestle. Over the next twelve years he produced and acted in a wide range of plays. Classics included The Way of the World (1924), The Duenna (1924), The Rivals (1925), The Beaux' Stratagem (1927) She Stoops to Conquer (1928) and The Critic (1928). Playfair interspersed the classics with new musical shows with scores by Dennis Arundell, Thomas Dunhill and Alfred Reynolds and words by himself, A. P. Herbert and others: Riverside Nights (1926), Tantivy Towers (1931) and Derby Day (1932). The Times commented that these shows demonstrated that Playfair's "special method – a mingling of intimacy, brightness, and burlesque – was not applicable to the classics alone". Sharp writes that Playfair gathered "a loyal and happy team of young players, musicians, and designers who, under his genial leadership, not only began to make their reputations and confirm his, but also helped to create a specific Lyric style".

During his Hammersmith years Playfair continued to be active in other theatres. He produced As You Like It for the opening of the Shakespeare Festival at Stratford-upon-Avon in April 1919, and brought it to the Lyric in April 1920. He played Touchstone, in a production with set and costumes by Claud Lovat Fraser. It was a radical departure, inspired by the innovative ballet company the Ballets Russes. At the time, the text was usually heavily cut, but Playfair gave it almost complete. The scholar David Crystal describes the production as "bright, dynamic and musical, with young actors". At the time, some theatre-goers resented it, (Note: In his memoir Story of the Lyric Theatre, Hammersmith, Playfair recalled, "When Lovat Fraser was walking in the street, a woman came up to him and shook her fist in his face. 'Young man', she said impressively, 'how dare you meddle with our Shakespeare!'") but Crystal comments that many critics now call it the first modern production of the play.

In 1922 Playfair bought a long lease on Thurloe Lodge in South Kensington. Playfair and his family had previously lived at 26 Pelham Crescent. He bought the cottages with the proceeds from The Beggar's Opera. Playfair engaged Darcy Braddell to remodel the house. The remodelling had cost twice as much as anticipated, and proved a drain on his finances in the wake of the failure of his light opera Midsummer Madness. Playfair would hold rehearsals for Midsummer Madness in the garden of Thurloe Lodge. The family moved from the house in late 1924 or early 1925.

Playfair was the author of the English acting versions of Karel Čapek's R.U.R. and (with Clifford Bax) The Insect Play (both 1923), and he appeared in, and produced, many pieces outside his own theatre, including appearances in Prisoners of War at the Playhouse Theatre and The Green Hat at the Adelphi (both 1925), The Duchess of Elba at the Arts (1927), The Lady of the Camellias at the Garrick (1930). and Vile Bodies at the Arts (1931).

Playfair was prominent in fund-raising for London voluntary hospitals and was a member of the committee of King Edward's Hospital Fund. He was knighted in 1928.

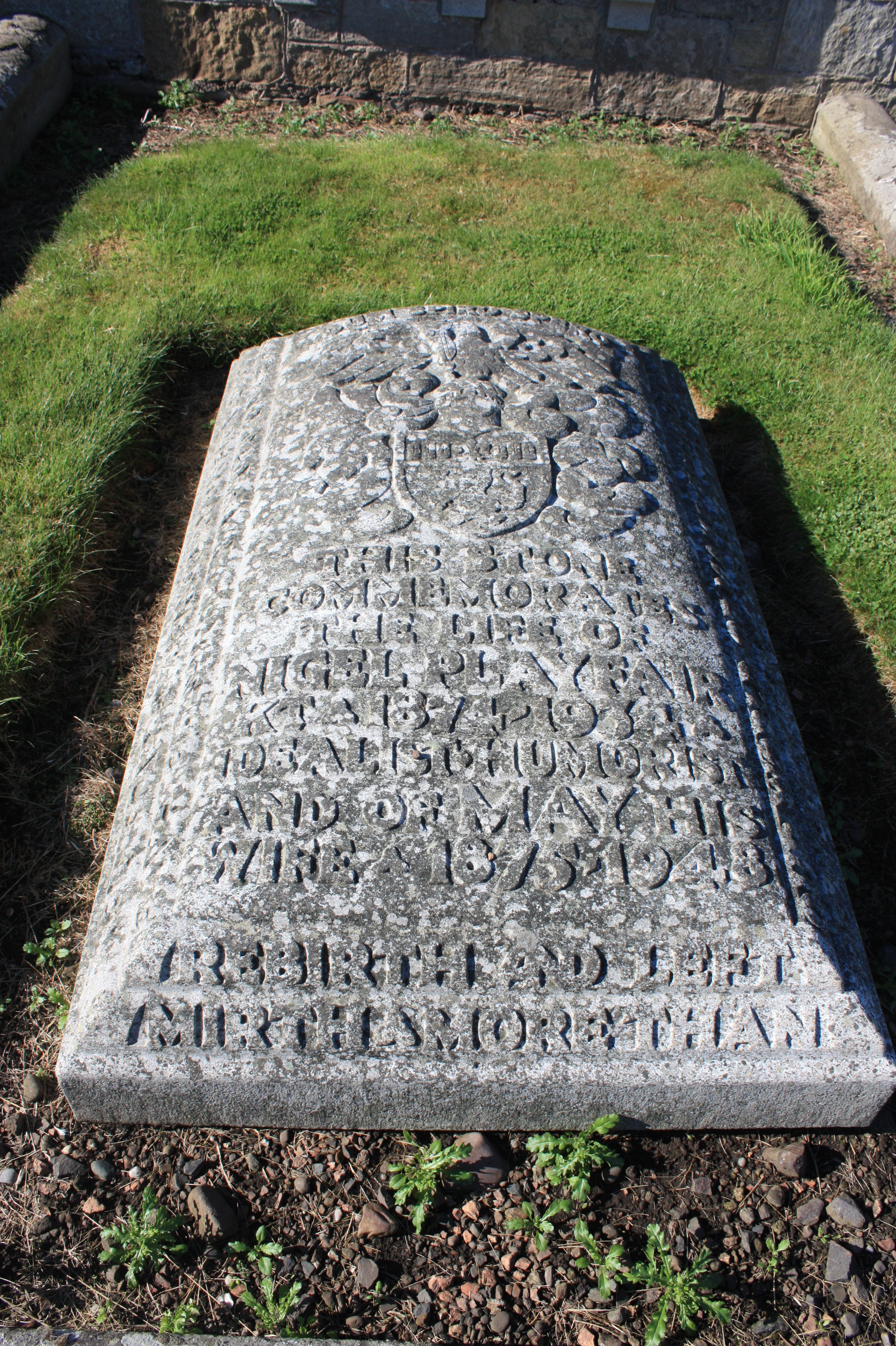
Commemorative stone, St Andrews

After a short illness and an unsuccessful operation Playfair died at King's College Hospital, London on 19 August 1934, aged 60. He was cremated and his ashes were buried in the Playfair family vault in St Andrews.

== Legacy ==
Fortnum & Masons sell a type of marmalade, made for Playfair since the 1920s and named in memory of him.

In 1965, London County Council erected a blue plaque commemorating Playfair at his former home, 26 Pelham Crescent, South Kensington.

== Memoirs ==
Playfair wrote two volumes of memoirs about the Lyric:

- The Story of the Lyric Theatre, Hammersmith with an introduction by Arnold Bennett and an epilogue by A. A. Milne. (London: Chatto & Windus 1925) OCLC 632487376
- Hammersmith Hoy: A Book of Minor Revelations (London: Faber & Faber 1930) OCLC 1073804225

== Films ==
Playfair appeared in some films. He made several silents, and what his biographer Robert Sharp calls "four indifferent talkies":

- Princess Clementina (1911, short)
- Lady Windermere's Fan (1916)
- Masks and Faces (1917)
- Sunken Rocks (1919)
- Perfect Understanding (1933)
- Crime on the Hill (1933)
- The Lady Is Willing (1934)
- Little Stranger (1934)

Sharp rates Crime on the Hill as "perhaps his best, a country-house murder mystery in which he played the murderer.

== Honours ==
- Playfair was knighted in the 1928 Birthday Honours, gazetted on 1 June 1928.

== Notes, references and sources ==
=== Sources ===
- Crystal, David (2005). The Shakespeare Miscellany. London: Penguin. ISBN 978-1-58567-716-0.
- Gaye, Freda, ed. (1967). Who's Who in the Theatre (fourteenth ed.). London: Sir Isaac Pitman and Sons. OCLC 5997224.
- Hartnoll, Phyllis (1967). The Oxford Companion to the Theatre. London and New York: Oxford University Press. ISBN 978-0-19-211531-7.
- Parker, John; Freda Gaye; Ian Herbert (1978). Who Was Who in the Theatre. Detroit: Gale Research. OCLC 310466458.
- Playfair, Giles (1937). My Father's Son. Geoffrey Bles. OCLC 753228702.
