= Robert Hawthorn Kitson =

British painter (1873-1947)

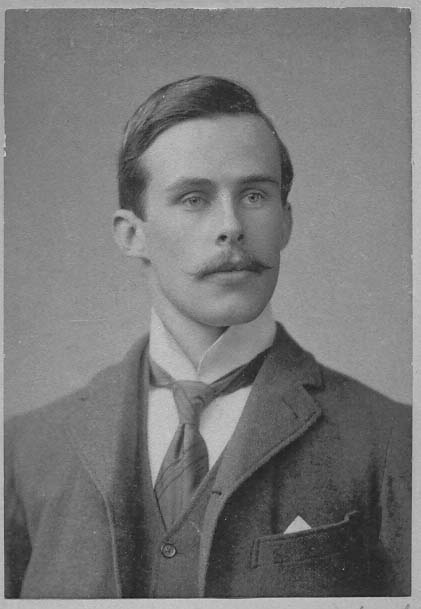
- Kitson, photographed in 1906
- Born: 3 July 1873; Leeds, Yorkshire, England
- Died: 17 September 1947 (aged 74); Taormina, Sicily, Italy
- Resting place: Cimitero Monumentale di Taormina, Taormina, Sicily, Italy
- Education: Trinity College, Cambridge
- Known for: Watercolours
- Partner: Carlo Siligato

Robert Hawthorn Kitson (3 July 1873 — 17 September 1947) was a British painter. As a gay man, he chose to leave England, where the Labouchere Amendment made life difficult. He settled in Sicily, where he built a villa in Taormina, Casa Cuseni, that is now a historic house museum.

== Family background ==
Robert Hawthorn Kitson was born into a wealthy family, the eldest son of John Hawthorn Kitson and Jessie Ellershaw. His grandfather James Kitson founded locomotive engineering firm Kitson and Company, and had several children. Robert Hawthorn's uncles were James Kitson, 1st Baron Airedale and Arthur Octavius Kitson, and his aunt Emily married the eminent obstetrician William Smoult Playfair. Dr Playfair and Arthur Kitson were adversaries in a notorious court case in 1896. Robert's sister was the first female Lord Mayor of Leeds, Jessie Kitson, in 1942–43.

== Early years ==
He studied at Shrewsbury School and then went to Trinity College, Cambridge to study Natural Sciences in 1895. The following year, Kitson was chosen to receive a Harkness Scholarship and mostly concentrated on geological studies. At Cambridge he befriended the painter Cecil Arthur Hunt.

Kitson suffered from rheumatic fever and was advised to spend the winters out of England, in a sunnier climate. Kitson became an artist, learning watercolour painting on sketching tours with Sir Alfred East and Sir Frank Brangwyn. From 1900 he was an active member of the Leeds Fine Arts Club.

== Life in Sicily ==
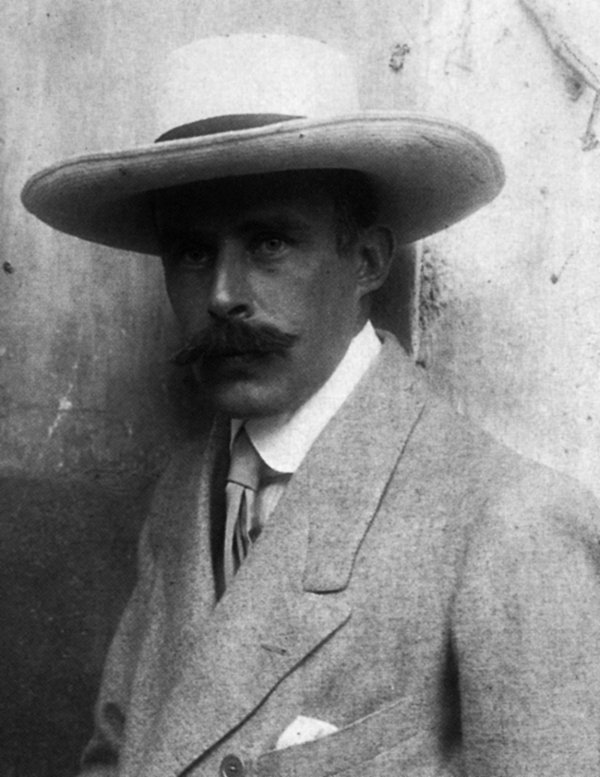
Kitson in 1911

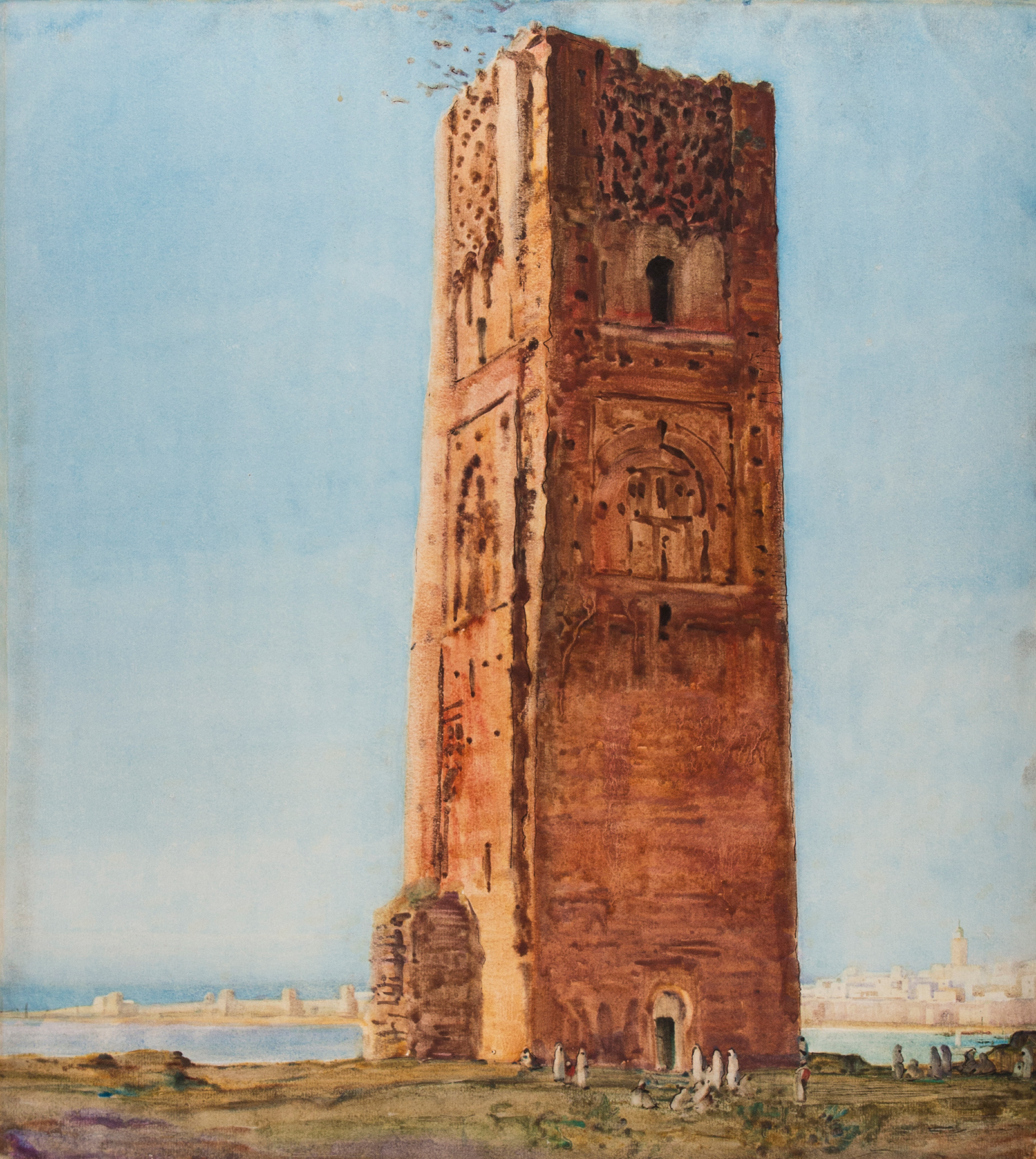
The Hassan Tower, Rabat by Kitson (c. 1910)

After his father's death in 1899, Kitson moved to Sicily and settled in Taormina, where he designed and built Casa Cuseni, a villa with views of Mount Etna, Europe's most famous active volcano.

Prior to this, Kitson spent time in Venice, where he had his own regular gondolier. He also visited Naples and Ravello with his family and friends from Cambridge. He selected Taormina at a particular moment in its history: it had become a popular winter resort for wealthy northern Europeans, and was known to be welcoming to artists and tolerant of gay men -- at least, those who were foreign and moneyed. Wilhelm von Gloeden had come to Taormina as a health tourist in the late 1870s, and built his studio there. Edward Chaney, an expert on the evolution of the Grand Tour and of Anglo-Italian cultural relations, described the town as attracting "male refugees from more repressive climates."

Kitson was one of von Gloeden's studio clients; he and his visitors took their films to be developed and printed at von Gloeden's studio. Kitson owned a small collection of von Gloeden's portraits of ephebes and heads of handsome Arab youths. Frank Brangwyn writes in his letters that Kitson and von Gloeden were good friends before the First World War. One of Kitson's sketchbooks has a large group of sketches of young men, clothed as if Arabs and taken after von Gloeden's models. Von Gloeden photographed Kitson's Taorminese lover, Carlo Siligato, making portraits and nudes.

Kitson also had a long friendship with Bobbie Pratt-Barlow, a distant relative who settled in the Villa Rosa just below Casa Cuseni. Kitson travelled extensively around Europe by train and took long voyages to North Africa, Egypt, Istanbul and, once, to Ceylon and India. He lived at Casa Cuseni until he was forced to return to England when World War II reached Italy and Sicily became a battleground.

== After World War II ==
When Sicily fell, Kitson was in regular communication with his friends left there. He had given the Allies information on Sicily and tried, without success, to save the ancient bridge over the Alcantara river from destruction. He was happy to find out that Casa Cuseni survived the War and this spurred on his attempts to get back to Sicily. The Mayor of Taormina requested to the British authorities that Kitson return to be president of the local building commission. His presence was regarded as essential to the reconstruction of the town, since it was more or less in ruins following the bombardment of 9 July 1943.

Kitson returned to Sicily by the end of January 1946. In summer 1947, Kitson returned to his pre-war custom of spending part of the summer with family and friends in England. He flew back to Italy early in September, stopping in Rome. He returned to Taormina on 15 September 1947 and died at Casa Cuseni two days later. He was buried in the town's non-Catholic cemetery, in the presence of his Sicilian friends, some English expatriates and the Deputy British Consul in Sicily.

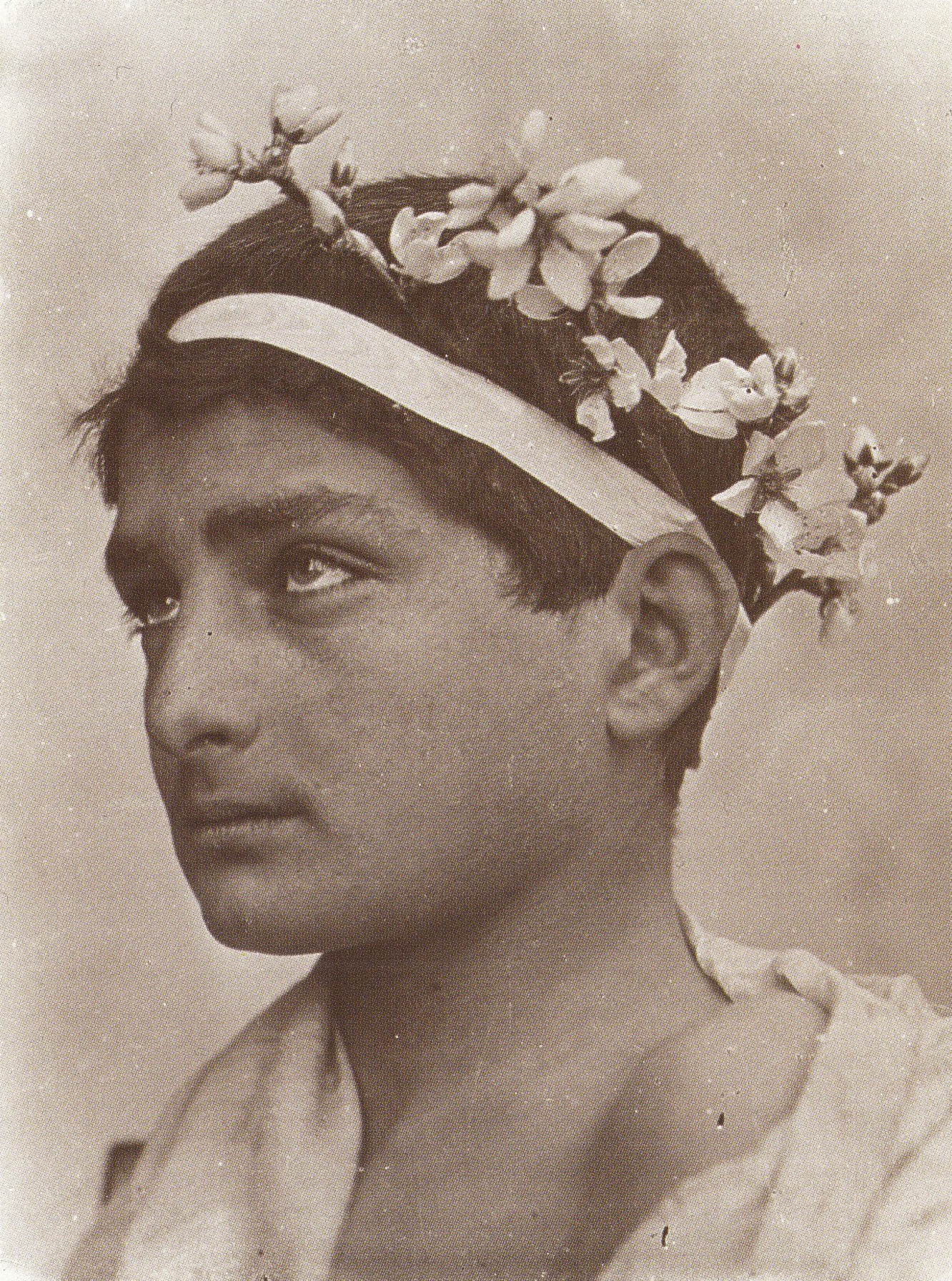
Carlo Siligato by Wilhelm von Gloeden, ca. 1890/93.

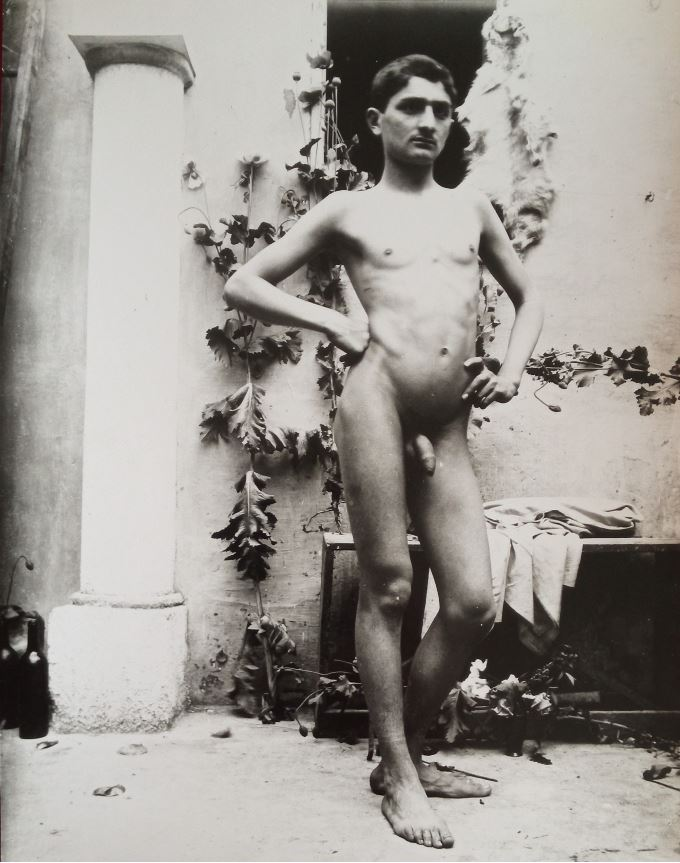
Carlo Siligato, by Wilhelm von Gloeden.

== Personal life ==
Kitson realised he was homosexual at an early age. He was able to live relatively freely, if not openly, in Taormina, surrounded by a community of artists and aristocrats. Charles Leslie writes that Kitson had a brief romantic relationship with Frank Brangwyn, whom he later employed for decoration of his Taorminese villa. In Taormina, his long-time companion was the Sicilian painter Carlo Siligato (1875-1959) A series of photographs of Siligato by Wilhelm von Gloeden, ca. 1890/93, survives.

People in Taormina called Kitson the "crazy Englishman" for his appearance. He was tall and thin with blue eyes and a moustache and dressed with flamboyance in his colourful jackets.

== Casa Cuseni ==
When Kitson first went to Taormina in 1898, he decided to build a house there, 800 feet above the sea. There he constructed his villa, Casa Cuseni, in the classical style, using local stones, marble, wood and terracotta. Kitson commissioned his friend Frank Brangwyn to create the dining room, for which Brangwyn designed the furniture and painted frescos. When Kitson died in 1947, the villa was inherited by his niece Daphne Phelps, who maintained and ran it till her death in 2005. Phelps wrote a memoir entitled A House in Sicily in 1999. Casa Cuseni has been declared an Italian National Monument and now hosts a museum of fine art and a small hotel.

== Exhibitions ==
Kitson regularly exhibited his work at the Royal Society of British Artists, at the 1925 International Exhibition of Modern Decorative and Industrial Arts and had solo exhibitions at the Fine Art Society and in the Redfern Gallery. Kitson's first major exhibition was in Rome in 1919 with a group of foreign artists resident in Italy. He exhibited 19 watercolours of Sicily and Kairouan. In October 1925 his solo show at the Fine Art Society included 57 works.

== Collections ==
Kitson's works are exhibited at the Victoria and Albert Museum, Leeds University Library, and the Herbert F. Johnson Museum of Art. The most important collection of his watercolours is now at the Museum of Fine Arts of Taormina at Casa Cuseni.

== See also ==
- History of Taormina
