= Lethrinus longirostris =

Scientific classification
- Kingdom: Animalia
- Phylum: Chordata
- Class: Actinopterygii
- Order: Acanthuriformes
- Family: Lethrinidae
- Genus: Lethrinus
- Species: L. longirostris

Binomial name
- Lethrinus longirostris Playfair, 1867

Species of fish

Lethrinus longirostrus is a species of marine ray-finned fish belonging to the family Lethrinidae, the emperors and emperor breams. This species is found in the Indo-Pacific region.

== Taxonomy ==
Lethrinus longirostris was first formally described in 1867 by the Scottish naturalist Lambert Playfair with its type locality given as Zanzibar. This species has been considered to be synonymous with Lethrinus olivaceus but was confirmed as a separate valid species based on morphological and genetic differences in 2022. Some authors place the genus Lethrinus in the monotypic subfamily Lethrininae, with all the other genera of Lethrinidae placed in the Monotaxinae, however, the 5th edition of Fishes of the World does not recognise the subfamilies traditionally accepted within the family Lethrinidae as valid. The family Lethrinidae is classified by the 5th edition of Fishes of the World as belonging to the order Spariformes.

== Description ==
Lethrinus longirostris is very similar to L. olivaceus but consistently differs in its gill raker counts. The colour of the upper part of the front of the snout is reddish in individuals with a standard length greater than 45 cm (18 in) compared to orange-yellowish in L. olivaceus, there are red transverse band on the snout and between the eyes in individuals with a standard length in excess of 50 cm (20 in) compared to one band over the eye and on in front of the eye in L. olivaceus.

== Distribution ==
Lethrinus longirostris has a wide Indo-Pacific range from the Red Sea south to South Africa and east to the Marshall Islands and the Tuamotu Islands, north to Japan and south to New Caledonia.
