= William Playfair (disambiguation) =

William Playfair was a Scottish engineer and political economist.

William Playfair may also refer to:

- William Smoult Playfair (1835–1903), Scottish obstetric physician
- William Henry Playfair (1790–1857), Scottish architect
