= James Kitson =

James Kitson may refer to:

- James Kitson, 1st Baron Airedale (1835–1911), British industrialist, locomotive builder and politician
- James Kitson (businessman) (1807–1885), English cricketer and railway industrialist
