= Temple Lodge =

English listed building in Hammersmith, London

Coordinates: 51.490212°N 0.22537222°W

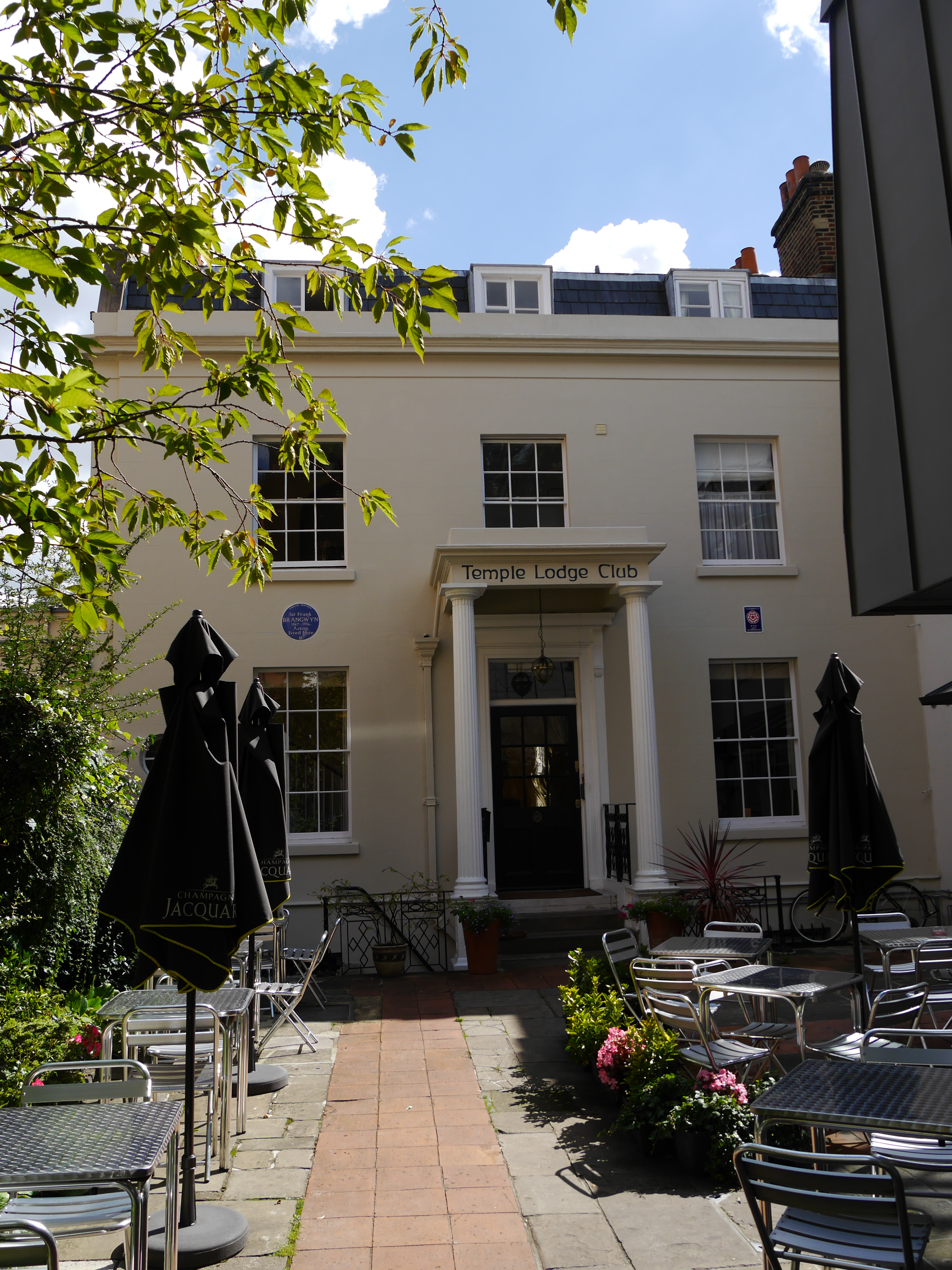
Temple Lodge

Temple Lodge is a Grade II listed building at 51 Queen Caroline Street, Hammersmith, London, W6 9QL.

The house dates from the early 19th century. The attached studio to the right was created in about 1908 by the artist Frank Brangwyn.
