= Baron Playfair =

Extinct barony in the Peerage of the United Kingdom

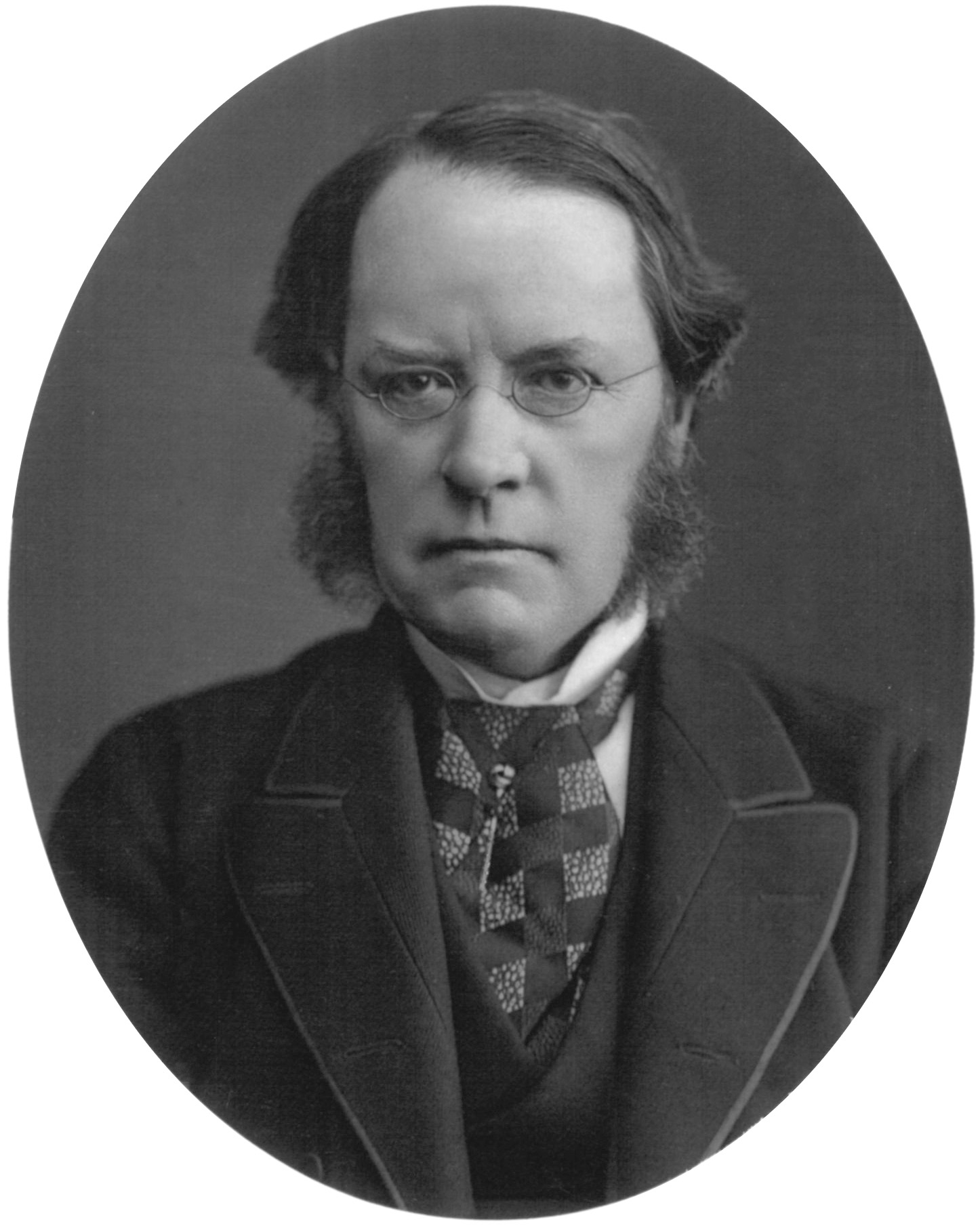
Lyon Playfair, 1st Baron Playfair

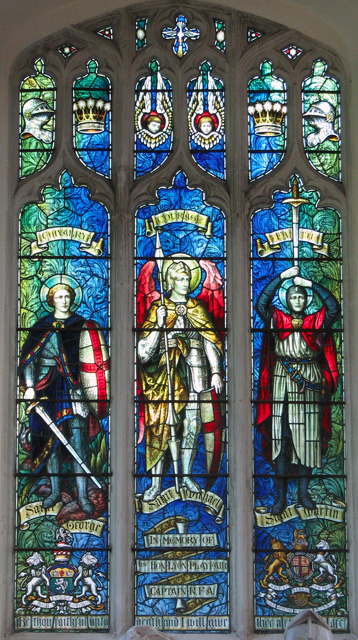
Playfair Memorial Window, St Mary's Church, Redgrave, Suffolk, dedicated to Captain The Hon. Lyon Playfair (1889–1915), Royal Field Artillery, killed in action near Ypres on 20 April 1915, aged 26. He was the only son of Brigadier-General George James Playfair, 2nd Baron Playfair (1849–1939)

Baron Playfair, of St Andrews in the County of Fife, was a title in the Peerage of the United Kingdom. It was created on 3 September 1892 for the scientist and Liberal politician Sir Lyon Playfair. He was succeeded by his only son, the second Baron. The second Baron was a Brigadier-General in the British Army. The second Baron's only son, the Hon. Lyon George Henry Lyon Playfair (1888–1915), was a captain in the Royal Field Artillery and was killed in action in the First World War, unmarried. Consequently, the title became extinct on the death of the second Baron in 1939.

== Barons Playfair (1892) ==
- Lyon Playfair, 1st Baron Playfair (1818–1898)
- George James Playfair, 2nd Baron Playfair (1849–1939)
