= Frank Brangwyn =

Welsh artist and designer (1867–1956)

Sir Frank Brangwyn RA RWS RBA
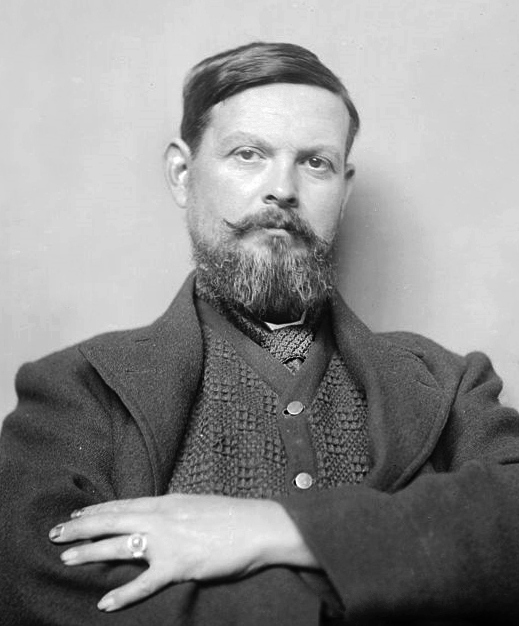
- Brangwyn c. 1900
- Born: Frank William Brangwyn; 12 May 1867; Bruges, Belgium
- Died: 11 June 1956 (aged 89); Ditchling, East Sussex, England
- Awards: Albert Medal (1932)

Sir Frank William Brangwyn RA RWS RBA (12 May 1867 – 11 June 1956) was a Welsh artist, painter, watercolourist, printmaker, illustrator and designer.

Brangwyn worked in a wide range of artistic fields. As well as paintings and drawings, he produced designs for stained glass, furniture, ceramics, glass tableware, mosaics, buildings and interiors, and was a lithographer and woodcutter and book illustrator. It has been estimated that during his lifetime Brangwyn produced more than 12,000 works. His mural commissions would cover over 22,000 sq ft (2,000 m^{2}) of canvas, he painted over 1,000 oils, more than 660 mixed-media works (watercolours, gouache), over 500 etchings, around 400 wood-engravings and woodcuts, 280 lithographs, 40 architectural and interior designs, 230 designs for items of furniture and 20 stained glass panels and windows.

Brangwyn received some artistic training, probably from his father, and later from Arthur Heygate Mackmurdo and in the workshops of William Morris, but he was largely an autodidact without a formal artistic education. When, at the age of 17, one of his paintings was accepted at the Royal Academy Summer Exhibition, he was strengthened in his conviction to become an artist. Initially, he painted traditional subjects about the sea and life on the seas. His 1890 canvas, Funeral At Sea won a medal of the third class at the 1891 Paris Salon. The murals for which Brangwyn was famous, and during his lifetime he was very famous indeed, were brightly coloured and crowded with details of plants and animals, although they became flatter and less flamboyant later in his life.

== Biography ==
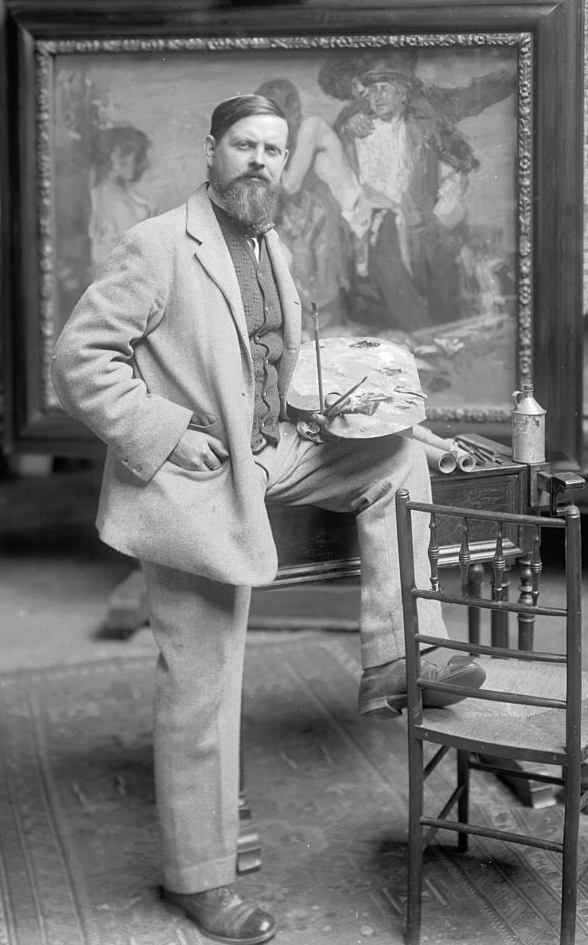
Frank Brangwyn c. 1900

=== Early life and career ===
Frank Brangwyn was born in Bruges, Belgium, where his father, William Curtis Brangwyn, moved after winning a competition organised by the Belgian Guild of St Thomas and St Luke to design a parish church. His forenames were registered as Guillaume François. In Bruges, his father maintained a large workshop with several staff and worked on numerous civic projects as well as the parish church. William Curtis Brangwyn had been born in Buckinghamshire to a Welsh family and married Eleanor Griffiths, who was from Brecon. In 1874, the family moved back to the United Kingdom where William Curtis Brangwyn established a successful design practice. Frank Brangwyn attended Westminster City School but often played truant to spend time in his father's workshop or drawing in the South Kensington Museum. Through contacts made at the museum, among them Arthur Heygate Mackmurdo, he obtained an apprenticeship with William Morris for whom he worked first as a glazer before undertaking embroidery and wallpaper work.

At the age of seventeen, one of Brangwyn's paintings was accepted and then sold to a shipowner, at the Royal Academy Summer Exhibition, which strengthened him in his conviction to become an artist. Brangwyn joined the Royal Navy Volunteer Reserve and began painting seascapes. He convinced the shipowner who had bought his Royal Academy picture to let him sail on a freighter to Istanbul. This trip provided Brangwyn with the material for several notable paintings. Whereas Funeral at Sea, which won a medal at the Paris Salon in 1891 was mostly composed in grey, The Golden Horn, Constantinople was much brighter and full of colour. Although Brangwyn held his first one-man show in London in 1891, he spent most of that year and 1890 at sea, visiting Spain several times as well as returning to Istanbul and travelling to South Africa and Zanzibar. In 1892 he visited northern Spain with the Scottish artist Arthur Melville, travelling from Zaragoza along the Canal Imperial de Aragon on the barge, the Santa Maria. Soon Brangwyn was attracted by the light and the bright colours of these southern countries at a time when Orientalism was becoming a favoured theme for many painters. He made many paintings and drawings, particularly of Spain, Egypt, Turkey and Morocco, which he visited in 1893. This lightened his palette, a change that initially did not find critical favour but helped establish his international reputation. In 1895 the French government purchased his painting Market in Morocco.

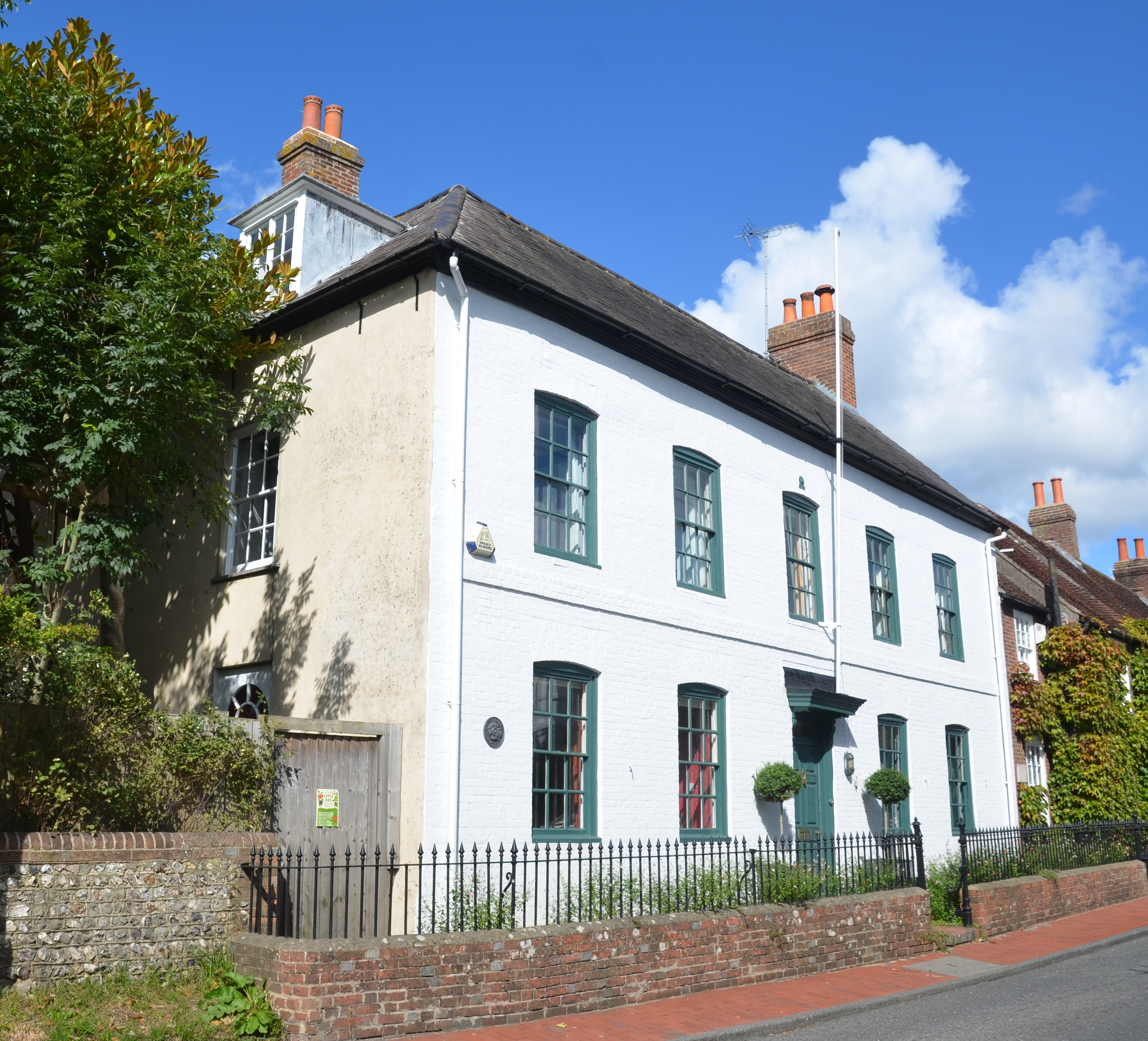
The Jointure, 15 South Street, Ditchling, where Brangwyn lived and worked.

In 1895, the Parisian art dealer Siegfried Bing commissioned Brangwyn to decorate the exterior of his Galerie L'Art Nouveau, and encouraged Brangwyn into new avenues: murals, tapestry, carpet designs, posters and designs for stained glass to be produced by Louis Comfort Tiffany. In 1896 he illustrated a six-volume reprint of Edward William Lane's translation of One Thousand and One Nights. In 1917 he collaborated with the Japanese artist Urushibara Mokuchu on a series of woodblock prints. For his austere but decorative designs he was recognized by continental and American critics as a prominent artist, while British critics were puzzled as to how to evaluate him. Through his collecting Japanese works, he became friends with Kōjirō Matsukata the Japanese industrial magnate, who became his patron.

The Brisbane-based artist James Chesterfield, also known as James Chesterfield Brangwyn, who was born in 1883 or 1884 in France and raised in Cornwall and Wales, was according to his family an illegitimate son of Frank Brangwyn.

In 1896, Brangwyn married Lucy Ray, a nurse, who died in 1924. They had no children. He leased Temple Lodge, 51 Queen Caroline Street, Hammersmith, London from 1900 to 1937/38 and bought The Jointure, Ditchling, Sussex in 1918.

=== Mural commissions ===
Brangwyn was commissioned by his friend the artist Robert Hawthorn Kitson to design the dining room of Casa Cuseni, his house in Taormina, Sicily, built from 1902 to 1905. Brangwyn was responsible for the furniture, panelling, detailing and murals of the dining room. The house is now a museum.

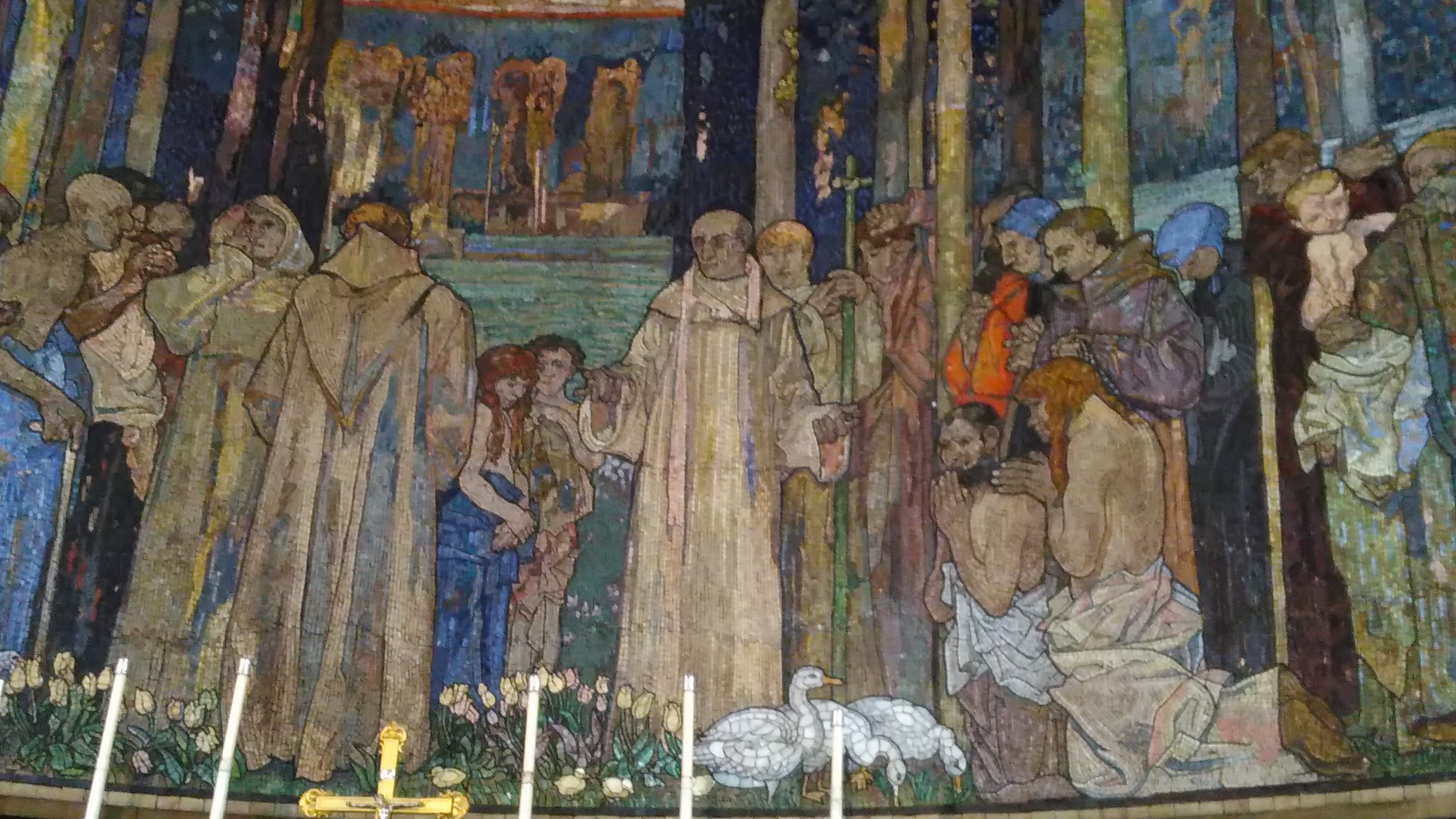
Detail of mosaic by Frank Brangwyn at St Aidan's Church, Leeds, showing St Aidan with his followers

Old Houses (Ghent). 1906. 55.5 × 60.5 cm. Museu Nacional d'Art de Catalunya

In 1908 Brangwyn was commissioned to paint the apse of St Aidan's Church, Leeds, but after it was realised that the air pollution would damage the paint, it was agreed he should work in glass mosaic. The mosaic (using Rust's vitreous mosaic) was completed in 1916. It covers the whole apse, and shows the life of St Aidan.

Other commissions included murals for the Great Hall of the Worshipful Company of Skinners in London (1901–1912), for the Royal Exchange, London (1906), the Panama-Pacific International Exposition, San Francisco, 1915 (now in the Herbst Theatre, Veteran's Building Auditorium, San Francisco), a Lunette for Cuyahoga County Courthouse, Cleveland, Ohio (1911–1915), the Manitoba Legislative Building, Winnipeg (1918–1921), the Chapel, Christ's Hospital School, Horsham (1912–1923), and the Missouri State Capitol, Jefferson City (1915–1925).

Along with Diego Rivera and Josep Maria Sert, he was chosen by John D. Rockefeller Jr. to decorate the concourse of the RCA Building in New York City (1930–34) with murals. A sequence of large murals on canvas (originally from Horton House, Northamptonshire) is held by the Dunedin Public Art Gallery, Dunedin, New Zealand and the Museum of New Zealand Te Papa Tongarewa in Wellington. He was also chosen to decorate the first-class dining room of the Canadian Pacific liner, RMS Empress of Britain (1930–1931)].

=== World War One ===
World War I poster for a fundraising event in support of Welsh troops. (1915) Lithograph. Digitally restored.

Brangwyn's etching, Canon Street Station, was presented in 1911 at the Leeds Art Gallery. Brangwyn's pupil was George Graham (1881-1949), President of the Society of Yorkshire Artists.

Although Brangwyn produced more than 80 poster designs during the First World War, he was not an official war artist. He donated most of these poster designs to charities such as the Red Cross, the Belgian and Allied Aid League, the Royal National Institute for the Blind and L'Orphelinat des Armees, an American charity supporting a French orphanage. His grim poster of a Tommy bayoneting an enemy soldier (Put Strength in the Final Blow: Buy War Bonds) caused deep offence in both Britain and Germany. The Kaiser himself is said to have put a price on Brangwyn's head after seeing the image. In 1917 Brangwyn produced six lithographs under the title Making Sailors and one entitled The Freedom of the Seas for the Ministry of Information's Britain's Efforts and Ideals portfolio of images which were exhibited in Britain and abroad and were also sold as prints to raise money for the war effort. Brangwyn was the Chairman of the English Committee for Diksmuide (Dixmude), near Ostend, a town that had been the site of heavy fighting throughout the war. To aid its reconstruction, Brangwyn donated a series of woodcuts to the town on the theme of the Tragedy of Dixmude. During the war Brangwyn created a number of propaganda images highlighting atrocities committed against Belgium and the suffering endured by the country. Among the latter were his oil painting of 1915, Mater Dolorosa Belgica.

=== The British Empire Panels ===
In 1926 Brangwyn was commissioned by Lord Iveagh to paint a pair of large canvases for the Royal Gallery of the House of Lords at Westminster to commemorate those peers and their family members who had been killed in the war. Brangwyn painted two battle scenes which included life-size images of troops advancing into battle alongside a British tank. The Lords regarded the panels as too grim and disturbing and, in 1928, refused to accept them. Instead, they commissioned Brangwyn to produce a series celebrating the beauty of the British Empire and the Dominions to fill the Royal Gallery, which became known as the British Empire Panels. Brangwyn spent a further five years producing 16 large works that cover 3,000 sq ft (280 m^{2}). However, after five of the panels were displayed in the Royal Gallery for approval by the Lords, the peers refused to accept them because they were "too colourful and lively" for the location. In 1934 the 16 panels were purchased by Swansea Council and are now housed in the Brangwyn Hall, Swansea.

=== Later life ===
The rejection of the Panels by the Lords caused a lasting depression in Brangwyn. He became increasingly pessimistic and a hypochondriac and began disposing of his possessions during the 1930s. Brangwyn donated many of his own and other artworks to museums and galleries in Britain and Europe including the British Museum and the William Morris Gallery. In 1936 he presented Bruges with over 400 works, now in the Arents House Museum. In return Bruges made him Citoyen d'Honneur de Bruges, only the third time the award had been given. The two battle scenes rejected by the House of Lords were donated to the National Museum Wales as part of a large group of gifts he made to the museum between 1929 and 1935. Brangwyn specified precisely where in the museum's Main Hall the works were to be hung and they remain there today. In 1944, he recovered and secured designs by Frederic Shields for the Chapel of the Ascension built by Herbert Horne, which was destroyed in 1940 during the London Blitz. In 1950, one of his last works provided illustrations for the book Sixty Years of Yachts by Herbert Julyan, a good friend.

In his final years Brangwyn lived as a recluse at Ditchling in East Sussex. He died there on 11 June 1956 and was buried in St Mary's Catholic Cemetery, Kensal Green.

In 1952 Clifford Musgrave estimated that Brangwyn had produced over 12,000 works. Brangwyn's mural commissions would cover over 22,000 sq ft (2,000 m^{2}) of canvas, he painted over 1,000 oils, over 660 mixed media works (watercolours, gouache), over 500 etchings, about 400 wood engravings and woodcuts, 280 lithographs, 40 architectural and interior designs, 230 designs for furniture, and 20 stained-glass panels and windows.

== Interpretations ==
The art writer Marius Gombrich links the decline of interest in Brangwyn's works to the decline of the British Empire, pointing out that Brangwyn's bold, vigorous, outward-looking art was suited to the expansive spirit of late-Victorian British society—but inconsistent with the inward-looking, less confident, and intellectually effete ethos prevalent in the post World War I period.

== Awards and honours ==
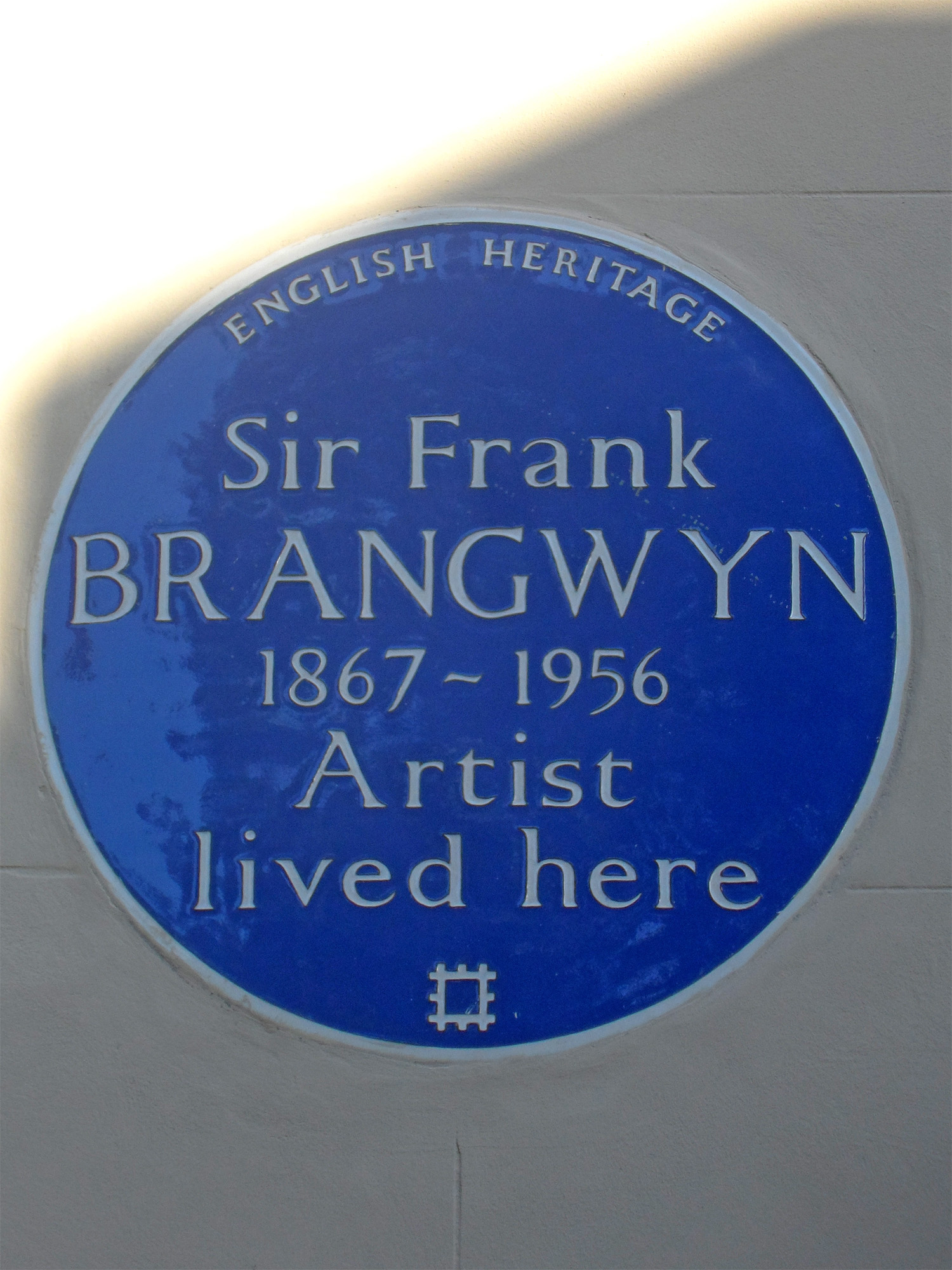
Blue plaque erected in 1989 by English Heritage at Temple Lodge, Hammersmith, London

- 1891 Medal at Paris Salon
- 1894 Two medals at the Chicago Exhibition
- 1897 Gold Medal, Munich for The Scoffers
- 1897 Silver Medal, Great Exhibition Paris for The Market of Bushire
- 1902 Chevalier of the Legion of Honour
- 1904 Associate member of the Royal Academy
- 1906 Gold medal of Venice and Grand Prix of Milan for the etching Sante Maria della Salute
- 1910 Commemorative Diploma at the Japan-British Exhibition
- 1911 Chevalier of the Order of the Crown of Italy
- 1912 Gold Medal, Berlin Salon
- 1917 Commander of the Italian Order of Saints Maurice and Lazarus
- 1919 Commander and Cross of the Order of Leopold I of Belgium
- 1919 First President of the Society of Graphic Art
- 1919 Full member of the Royal Academy
- 1925–1926, President of the Royal Birmingham Society of Artists.
- 1927 Became an Honorary Fellow of the Incorporated Association of Architects and Surveyors
- 1929 Served as Vice-President of I.A.A.S.
- 1932 The Albert Medal
- 1936 Grand Officer of the Order of Leopold II of Belgium
- 1941 Knight Bachelor, Great Britain

== Public collections ==
- Brighton Royal Pavilion & Museums
- Museum of New Zealand Te Papa Tongarewa: Frank Brangwyn
- William Morris Gallery, London: Frank Brangwyn

== Cited sources ==
- Horner, Libby (2006) Frank Brangwyn: A Mission to Decorate Life. The Fine Art Society & Liss Fine Art

== Bibliography ==
=== General ===
- Meic Stephens (Editor): The New Companion to the Literature of Wales (University of Wales Press, Cardiff, 1998) ISBN 0-7083-1383-3
- Preston, Hayter; Brangwyn, Frank (1923). Windmills. London: The Bodley Head Limited.

=== Specific ===
- Alford, Roger & Horner, Libby (Ed.s), Brangwyn in his Studio. The Diary of Frank Alford, Guildford: R Alford, 2004
- Brangwyn, Rodney, Brangwyn, London: William Kimber, 1978
- Cava, Paul (Ed.), Frank Brangwyn Photographs: Nude and Figure Studies, 2001, Paul Cava Fine Art, Bala Cynwyd, PA
- Cole, Diana de Vere, Brangwyn in Perspective: the life and work of Sir Frank Brangwyn 1867–1956, The One Roof Press, 2006, ISBN 978-0-9535824-3-3
- Bunt, Cyril, The Water-Colours of Sir Frank Brangwyn RA, Leigh-on-Sea, Frank Lewis, 1958
- Furst, Herbert, The Decorative Art of Frank Brangwyn, London: John Lane, The Bodley Head Ltd, 1924
- Galloway, Vincent, The Oils and Murals of Sir Frank Brangwyn RA, Leigh-on-Sea, Frank Lewis, 1962
- Gaunt, William, The Etchings of Frank Brangwyn RA, London: The Studio Limited, 1926
- Horner, Libby, A Humble Offering to the Peoplle [sic] of Walthamstow. Being a Short History of the Formation of the William Morris Gallery and Brangwyn Gift, Stanford: L Horner, 2008
- Horner, Libby, Christ's Hospital Murals, Stanford: L Horner, 2008
- Horner, Libby, Frank Brangwyn, A Mission to Decorate Life, 2006
- (Fr) Marechal Dominique, Frank Brangwyn et l’Italie. Une première analyse (1897-1914). in : G. Marini en L. Fanti (dir.), Noir & Blanc, La gravure belge et néerlandaise en Italie au début du XXe siècle ; L'incisione belga e neerlandese nell’Italia del primo Novecento (Studia Academiae Belgicae 1) [Peeters Publishers, Leuven-Paris-Bristol], 2021, pp.121-133, ill.
- Newbolt, Sir Francis, Catalogue dressé, Fine Art Society, 1908
- Sparrow, Walter Shaw, The Spirit of the Age, London: Hodder & Stoughton, 1905
- Sparrow, Walter Shaw, Frank Brangwyn and his Work, London: Kegan Paul, Trench, Trubner & Co, 1915
- Sparrow, Walter Shaw, Prints and drawings by Frank Brangwyn, London: John Lane, The Bodley Head, 1919
- Windsor, Alan, Brangwyn, Sir Frank William (1867–1956), Oxford Dictionary of National Biography, Oxford University Press, 2004; online edn, May 2005
