= Lyon Playfair, 1st Baron Playfair =

British scientist and politician (1818–1898)

The Right Honourable The Lord Playfair GCB PC FRS FRSE
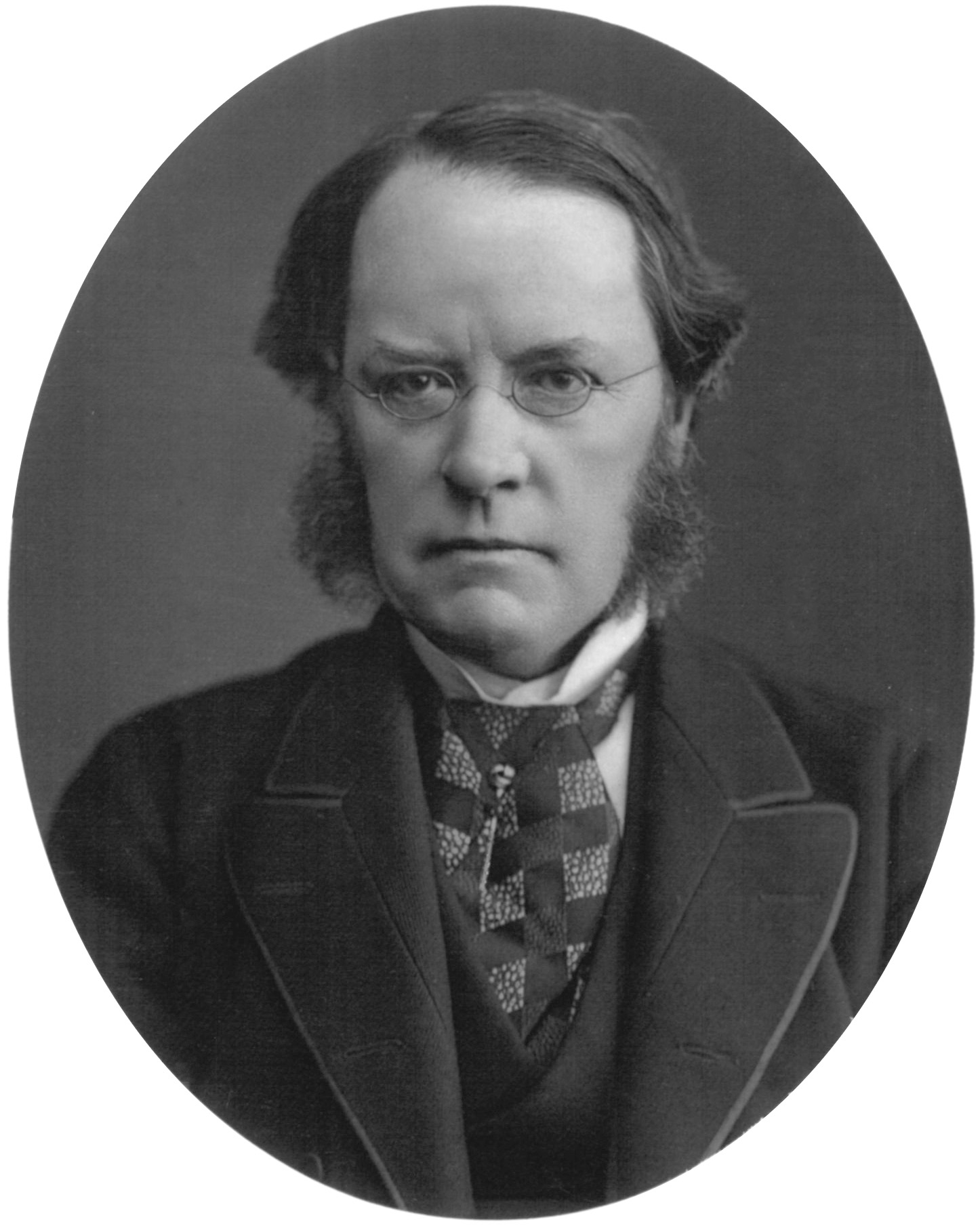

Postmaster General
- In office 18 November 1873 – 17 February 1874
- Monarch: Queen Victoria
- Prime Minister: William Ewart Gladstone
- Preceded by: William Monsell
- Succeeded by: Lord John Manners

Deputy Speaker of the House of Commons Chairman of Ways and Means
- In office 1880–1883
- Monarch: Queen Victoria
- Preceded by: Henry Cecil Raikes
- Succeeded by: Sir Arthur Otway, Bt

Vice-President of the Committee on Education
- In office 13 February 1886 – 20 July 1886
- Monarch: Queen Victoria
- Prime Minister: William Ewart Gladstone
- Preceded by: Sir Henry Holland, Bt
- Succeeded by: Sir Henry Holland, Bt

Personal details
- Born: 1 May 1818 Chunar, Bengal, British India
- Died: 29 May 1898 (aged 80) South Kensington, London
- Party: Liberal
- Spouse(s): Margaret Oakes (d. 1855); Jean Millington (d. 1877); Edith Russell (d. 1932)
- Relations: William Smoult Playfair (brother); Robert Lambert Playfair (brother)
- Education: University of St Andrews; University of Edinburgh

Lyon Playfair, 1st Baron Playfair (1 May 1818 – 29 May 1898) was a British scientist and Liberal politician who was Postmaster-General from 1873 to 1874.

== Early life ==
Playfair was born at Chunar, Bengal, the son of George Playfair (1781–1845), the chief inspector-general of hospitals in that region, and Janet Ross (1795–1862), daughter of John Ross. The family was fairly middle class with strong academic roots in University of St Andrews, his grandfather being Rev Prof James Playfair, Principal of the University of St Andrews. All of Playfair's siblings were sent back to Scotland to avoid the hazards of an Indian upbringing. Playfair was named after his uncle, Sir Hugh Lyon Playfair, and was educated at the University of St Andrews, the Andersonian Institute in Glasgow, and the University of Edinburgh. After going to Calcutta at the end of 1837, he became private laboratory assistant to Thomas Graham at University College London and in 1839 went to work under Justus Liebig at the University of Giessen.

== Early career ==
After returning to Britain, Playfair became manager of a calico works in Primrose, near Clitheroe, and in 1843 was appointed Professor of Chemistry at the Royal Manchester Institution, where he was assisted by Robert Angus Smith. Both Playfair (elected to membership on 25 January 1842) and Smith were members of the Manchester Literary and Philosophical Society. Two years later, he was made chemist to the Geological Survey, and subsequently became Professor in the new School of Mines. In 1848, he was elected to the Royal Society, and three years later was made Special Commissioner and a member of the executive committee of the Great Exhibition.

After the Exhibition, the Society of Arts organised a series of lectures to draw attention to the lessons which should be learned from the Exhibition. Playfair's two lectures were devoted to technical education, which he considered in Britain to be unfit for an increasingly competitive world. In preparation for his lectures, Playfair toured France, Holland, Belgium, Germany, Austria and Scandinavia to study their education systems. His first lecture was delivered to the School of Mines, under the title "Industrial Instruction on the Continent", and was published in the Records of the School of Mines. It aroused great public interest and Playfair later claimed that it gave a considerable impulse to technical education in Britain, with the government establishing the Department of Science and Art soon afterwards.

Appointed a Companion of the Order of the Bath, Playfair also became Gentleman Usher to Prince Albert, and in 1853 was appointed Secretary of the Department of Science, in which capacity he advocated the use of poison gas against the Russians in the Crimean War. In 1855, he was a commissioner of the Exposition Universelle, and two years later became President of the Chemical Society, finally returning to Edinburgh University in 1858 as Professor of Chemistry there. In 1859 he was elected a Fellow of the Royal Society of Edinburgh, his proposer being James David Forbes. He served as the Society's vice-president from 1864 to 1870.

== Political career ==
In 1868, Playfair was elected Liberal Member of Parliament for the Universities of Edinburgh and St Andrews, being sworn of the Privy Council and made Postmaster General in Gladstone's government in 1873. The Liberals lost power in early 1874 but on their return to office in 1880, Playfair was appointed Chairman of Ways and Means and Deputy Speaker of the House of Commons, holding these posts until 1883, when he was created a Knight Commander of the Order of the Bath. He was subsequently President of the British Association in 1885. In February 1886 he returned to the government as Vice-President of the Committee on Education under Gladstone, a post he held until the government fell in July of the same year. He was made a member of the Council of the Duchy of Cornwall in 1889.

During the 1870s and early 1880s, anti-vaccination supporters sought to repeal UK government legislation for compulsory childhood vaccination against smallpox. Playfair's speech to parliament in 1883 helped the government win a motion to keep compulsory vaccination by over 250 votes.

In November 1887, a meeting of the National Union of Conservative and Constitutional Associations held in Oxford passed a resolution calling for Fair Trade (a form of protectionism). The following month, Playfair defended free trade in a speech in Leeds, which was published by the Cobden Club under the title "On Fair Trade and the Depression in Agriculture". He later claimed that this pamphlet sold around 100,000 copies. The veteran free trade campaigner, John Bright, wrote to Playfair and said his speech was "one of the best, if not the best, spoken on the question".

Playfair delivered a speech to the City Liberal Club in London, where he claimed that economic depressions were not due to fiscal arrangements but were universal and synchronous in all industrialised nations. The advances in science, such as improved transport and the substitution of machine for manual labour, had lowered the value of labour of quantity and heightened the value of labour of quality. This, Playfair claimed, had dislocated labour. Playfair enlarged on this speech in an article for The Contemporary Review of March 1888. Afterwards, Playfair delivered a speech to the National Liberal Club, which was published as "On Industrial Competition and Commercial Freedom" by the Cobden Club. The Liberal Party leader, William Ewart Gladstone, wrote to Playfair to thank him for his "admirable tract; so comprehensive, clear, simple in statement, rich in illustration".

Having represented Leeds South since 1885, Playfair left the House of Commons in 1892 and was ennobled as Baron Playfair, of St Andrews in the County of Fife. He served as a Lord in Waiting (government whip in the House of Lords) under Gladstone and then Lord Rosebery between 1892 and 1895. He was further honoured when he was made a Knight Grand Cross of the Order of the Bath in 1895 and awarded the Harben Gold Medal from the Royal Institute of Public Health in 1897. Playfair is also remembered for promoting a new cipher system invented by Charles Wheatstone, now known as the Playfair cipher.

== Later life ==
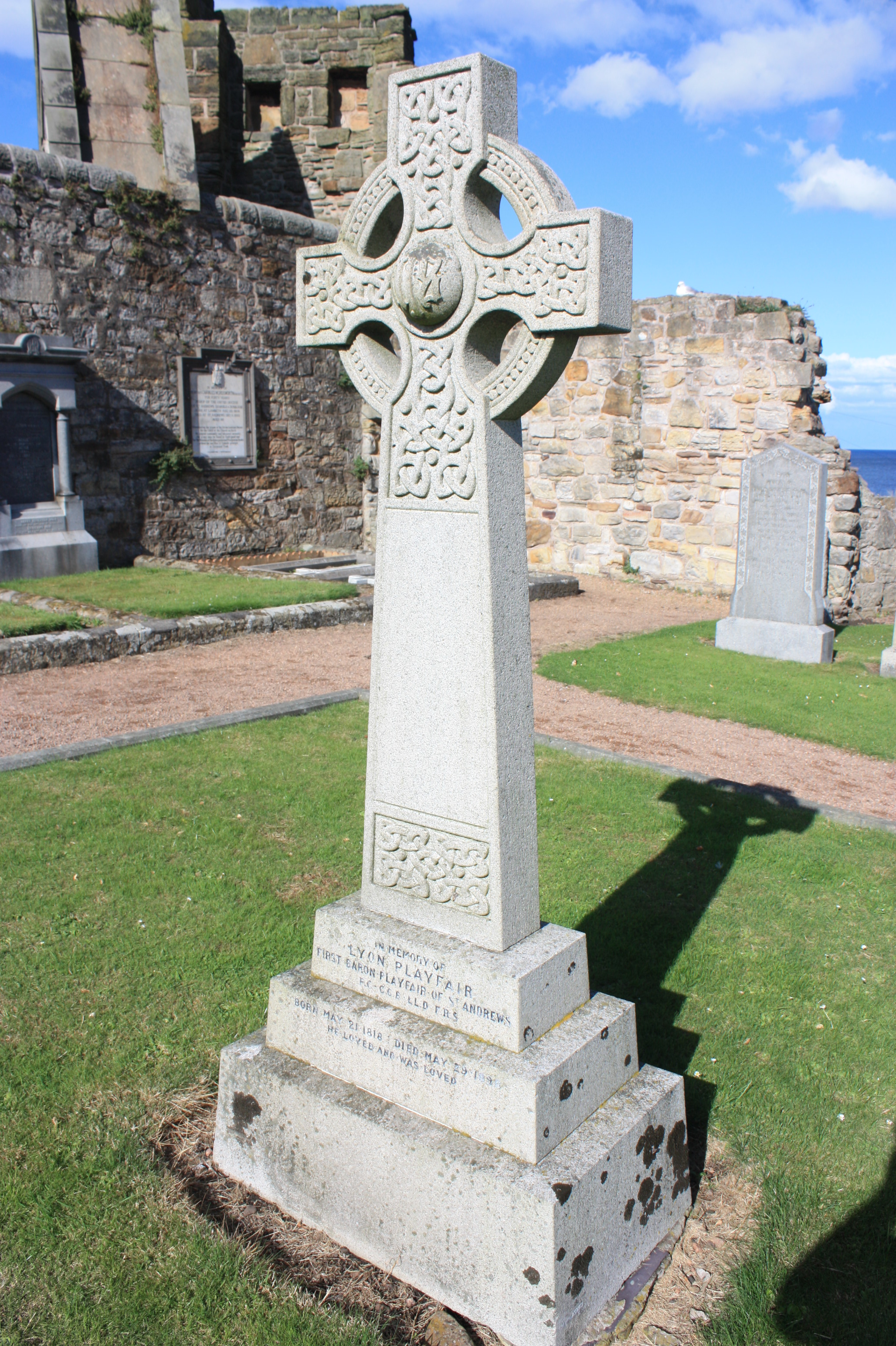
The grave of Lyon Playfair, East Cemetery, St Andrews

Lord Playfair died at his home at Onslow Gardens in South Kensington, London, in May 1898, aged 80. His body was returned to Scotland, where he was buried in the Eastern Cemetery, St Andrews, towards the north-east corner. He was succeeded in the barony by his son from his first marriage, George James Playfair (1849–1939) who is buried with him.

A memorial fountain was erected to Playfair in St Andrews in 1899, to a design by Robert Lorimer. The main library at Imperial College in London was originally named the Lyon Playfair Library in his honour.

== Family ==
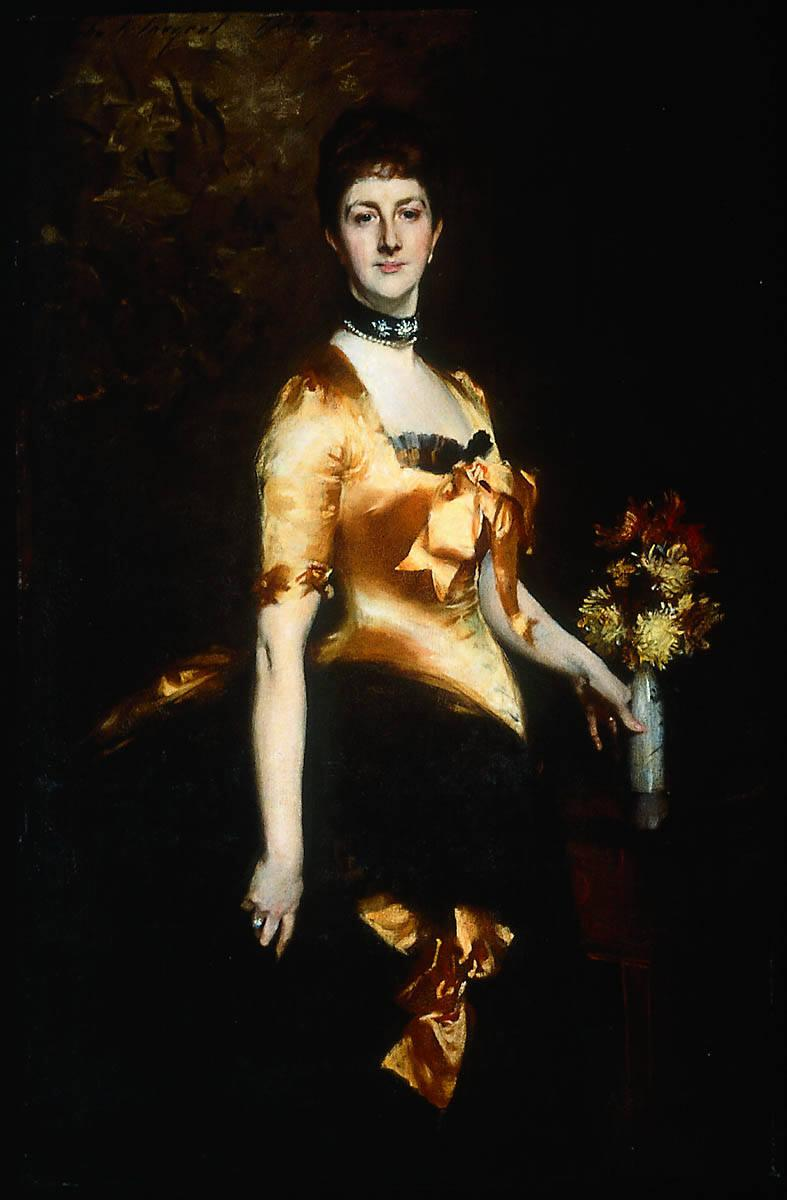
Edith, Lady Playfair (née Russell), John Singer Sargent, 1884

His younger brothers were, William Smoult Playfair, a well known obstetrician, and Sir Lambert Playfair, a soldier and diplomat.

Playfair married three times. He firstly married Margaret Eliza Oakes, daughter of James Oakes, in 1846. After her death in August 1855 he married Jean Ann Millington, daughter of Crawley Millington, in 1857. There were children from both marriages. Jean Ann died in 1877 and is buried in Dean Cemetery in Edinburgh facing the section known as "Lords Row". After her death, he married Edith Russell of Boston, whose 1884 portrait is in the Boston Museum of Fine Arts.

== Legacy ==
Playfair is credited with coining the quip "cannot see a forest for the trees of which it is composed".

== Notes ==
Parliament of the United Kingdom
New constituency	Member of Parliament for Edinburgh & St Andrews Universities; 1868–1885	Succeeded by John Macdonald
New constituency	Member of Parliament for Leeds South; 1885–1892	Succeeded by Sir John Lawson Walton
Preceded by Henry Cecil Raikes	Chairman of Ways and Means; 1880–1883	Succeeded by Sir Arthur Otway, Bt
Political offices
Preceded by William Monsell	Postmaster General; 1873–1874	Succeeded by Lord John Manners
Preceded by Sir Henry Holland, Bt	Vice-President of the Committee on Education; 1886	Succeeded by Sir Henry Holland, Bt
Peerage of the United Kingdom
New creation	Baron Playfair; 1892–1898	Succeeded by George James Playfair
