= Lambert Playfair =

British soldier, diplomat, naturalist and author

Sir Robert Lambert Playfair
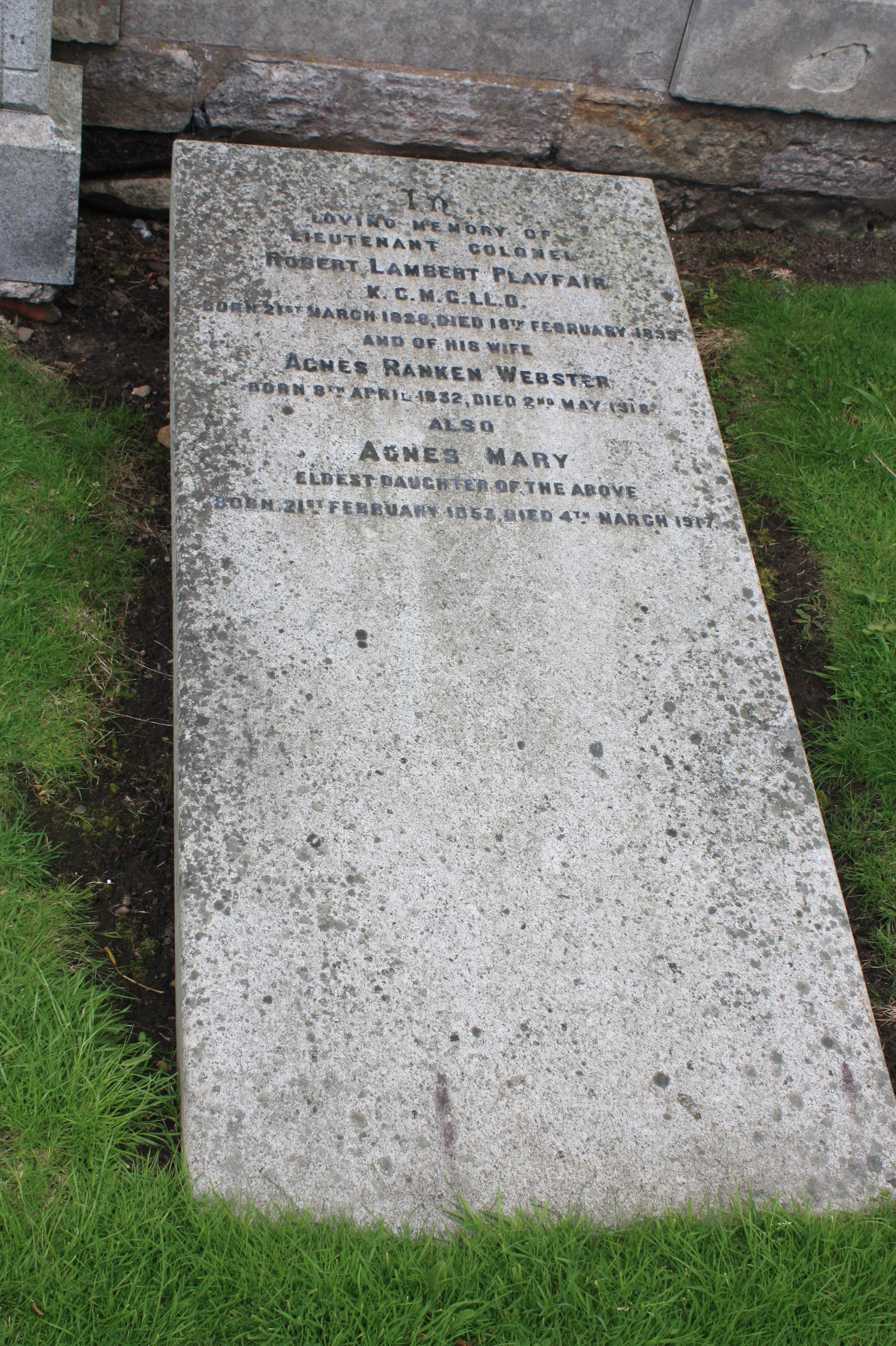
- The grave of Robert Lambert Playfair, Cathedral Cemetery, St Andrews
- Born: 21 March 1828; St Andrews, Scotland
- Died: 18 February 1899 (aged 70)
- Resting place: St Andrews Cathedral churchyard
- Other name: Lambert Playfair
- Education: Addiscombe College
- Occupations: Soldier, diplomat, naturalist, author
- Known for: Consul-General in Algeria; Political Agent at Aden and Zanzibar; Natural history and travel writings
- Spouse: Agnes Webster Ranken (1832–1918)
- Children: Agnes Mary Playfair (daughter)
- Parent(s): George Playfair; Jessie Ross
- Relatives: Lyon Playfair, 1st Baron Playfair (brother); William Smoult Playfair (brother); James Playfair (grandfather)
- Awards: KCMG (1886); Honorary doctorate, University of St Andrews
- Military career
- Allegiance: United Kingdom
- Branch: Madras Army
- Service years: 1846–1867
- Rank: Lieutenant-Colonel (honorary)
- Units: Artillery, Madras Staff Corps

Sir (Robert) Lambert Playfair KCMG (21 March 1828 – 18 February 1899) was a British soldier, diplomat, naturalist and author.

== Early life ==
Lambert Playfair was a grandson of James Playfair, principal of the University of St Andrews, and son of George Playfair (1782–1846), chief inspector-general of hospitals in Bengal, and his wife Jessie Ross. Lambert was born in St Andrews when his parents were at home on leave, and left there to be educated when they returned to India. His elder brother, Lyon, became Lyon Playfair, 1st Baron Playfair. Another brother was Dr William Smoult Playfair, who became involved in a notorious court case, Kitson v. Playfair.

== Career and later life ==
Playfair was a military cadet at Addiscombe College, then joined the Madras Army in 1846 at the age of 18. He became an artillery officer and with the rank of captain was appointed to the Madras Staff Corps in 1858. He was promoted to major in 1866, and left the army with the honorary rank of lieutenant-colonel in 1867.

Playfair was assistant political agent at Aden 1854–62, then political agent, then consul, at Zanzibar 1862–67, and was appointed consul-general in Algeria in 1867. His territory was extended to Algeria and Tunis in 1885. He was knighted KCMG in the Queen's Birthday Honours of 1886. He retired in 1896 and was given an honorary doctorate by the University of St Andrews.

He is buried in the churchyard of St Andrews Cathedral with his wife Agnes Webster Ranken (1832–1918) and eldest daughter Agnes Mary Playfair. The grave lies at the foot of his parents' grave.

== Publications ==
- A History of Arabia Felix or Yemen from the commencement of the Christian era to the present time; Including an account of the British settlement of Aden (Bombay, 1859)
- The Fishes of Zanzibar, with Albert Günther (London, 1866)
- Travels in the Footsteps of Bruce in Algeria and Tunis (1877)
- Handbook to the Mediterranean: its cities, coasts, and islands (London, 1881)
- The Scourge of Christendom: Annals of British relations with Algiers prior to the French Conquest (London, 1884)
- Bibliography of the Barbary States, Algeria, Cyrenaica and Morocco (1889)
- A Bibliography of Morocco from the Earliest time to the end of 1891 (London, 1892)

== See also ==
- Category:Taxa named by Lambert Playfair
