= Arthur Octavius Kitson =

British biographer

Arthur Octavius Kitson (19 April 1848, Leeds – 25 February 1915, Groombridge) was the British husband involved in the famous legal case Kitson v Playfair. He is also known for his 1907 biography of Captain James Cook.

== Family background ==
Arthur Octavius Kitson was the youngest of the four children born to the wealthy locomotive manufacturer James Kitson (1807–1885) and his wife Ann. James Kitson (1835–1911) was the eldest son, John Hawthorn was the second son, and Emily was the only daughter. In 1864 she married the eminent physician William Smoult Playfair.

== Linda Kitson ==
Arthur Kitson left England to live in Australia, supported by an annual allowance from his family (see remittance man). There he married Linda Elizabeth Douglas Leroy on 4 August 1881 in Rockhampton. They had two children, Arthur James Douglas (b. 1882) and Irene Marion Douglas (b. 1884). In October 1892 Linda Kitson and her two children returned to England, while Arthur, apparently pursued by creditors, went to Port Darwin and then embarked on various trips in the Pacific.

Emily and William Playfair welcomed Linda Kitson and her children and persuaded James and John Hawthorn Kitson to make over to her the annual allowance that her husband, their younger brother, had continued to receive. This payment (possibly reduced from £500 to £400 per annum) became the sole support of Linda Kitson and her children because she received nothing from her husband.

Linda Kitson settled in Kensington and consulted Dr. R. Muzio Williams about a gynecological problem. He persuaded her to see Dr. Playfair for a consultation. She was attended by Dr. Playfair on 16 January 1894 and again on 24 February 1894, when she revealed to him that she had not menstruated since December 1893.

She was put under chloroform by Playfair with Williams present, and her cervix dilated (so the court was later crudely informed) to the size of a five shiling piece.

Both doctors began the operation in the belief that they were dealing with an intrauterine cancerous growth, but they seemed to discover that Linda Kitson had recently had either a natural miscarriage or an abortion — even though she was separated from her husband.

Playfair had the placental material which he removed from Linda Kitson examined at King's College Hospital by his cousin, Dr Hugh Playfair, who confirmed his suspicions.

Dr. William Playfair communicated his suspicion to his wife and to her brothers Sir James and John Hawthorn. Furthermore, Playfair, on moral grounds, openly forbade her presence among female members of his family. Linda Kitson objected (probably falsely) that her husband had secretly visited her in London.

Sir James Kitson wrote to his sister-in-law that her annual allowance was ended and that she was excluded from the Kitson family, but if she returned to Australia he would provide a very small annual allowance. Linda Kitson was able to contact her husband by letter in June 1894; he was back in London by September 1894 and claimed (apparently falsely) that he had returned secretly to London in December 1893. This contretemps led to the famous case Kitson v. Playfair.

== Kitson v Playfair (1896) ==
In 1896 Linda Kitson brought a legal action against Dr. William Playfair for an alleged breach of professional confidence. The case was tried in the High Court of Justice before Henry Hawkins. Leading physicians spoke in court in support of Playfair's conduct but the judge found such conduct unacceptable, in accord with prevailing public opinion on medical confidentiality. The jury awarded record-breaking damages of £12,000 against Playfair. The amount was then reduced by legal agreement to £9,200 on application for a new trial. According to historian Angus McLaren, writing in 1993:

This celebrated case centred on a doctor's defence of his right of betraying, not a male, but a female patient's confidences. The primary importance of the trial and the responses made to it both inside and outside the medical profession is that it casts a revealing light on late-nineteenth-century doctors' confused understanding of exactly what confidentiality meant, a confusion exacerbated rather than clarified by court rulings. Secondly, the case demonstrates how the medical profession found, to its discomfort, that it was not left alone to police its duties, but was dictated to by its old rival, the legal profession. The last, though certainly not the least significant, aspect of the trial is that it shows how class and gender preoccupations shaped the practices of both law and medicine.

== Biography of Captain Cook ==
In 1907 Kitson's biography Captain James Cook, R.N., F.R.S., "the Circumnavigator" (xvi+525 p.) was published in London by John Murray and in New York by E. P. Dutton. Kitson's dedication "to my wife Linda Douglas Kitson" immediately precedes the preface of his book.

Kitson was given access by Joseph Chamberlain to some volumes of Colonial Records that were not yet available to the public and given information concerning a log of Captain Cook in the personal possession of Edward Ellis Morris. Kitson was also helped by Canon Frederick Bennett (1822–1903), whose mother was a cousin of Captain James Cook's wife Elizabeth.

Canon Frederick Bennett, was possibly the last person to have a personal recollection of Elizabeth Cook—he was thirteen years of age when she died. He communicated with two of Captain Cook's biographers, Arthur Kitson and Sir Walter Besant, loaning them documents, and passing on his memories of her.
