= William Smoult Playfair =

Physician and academic

William Smoult Playfair FRCP
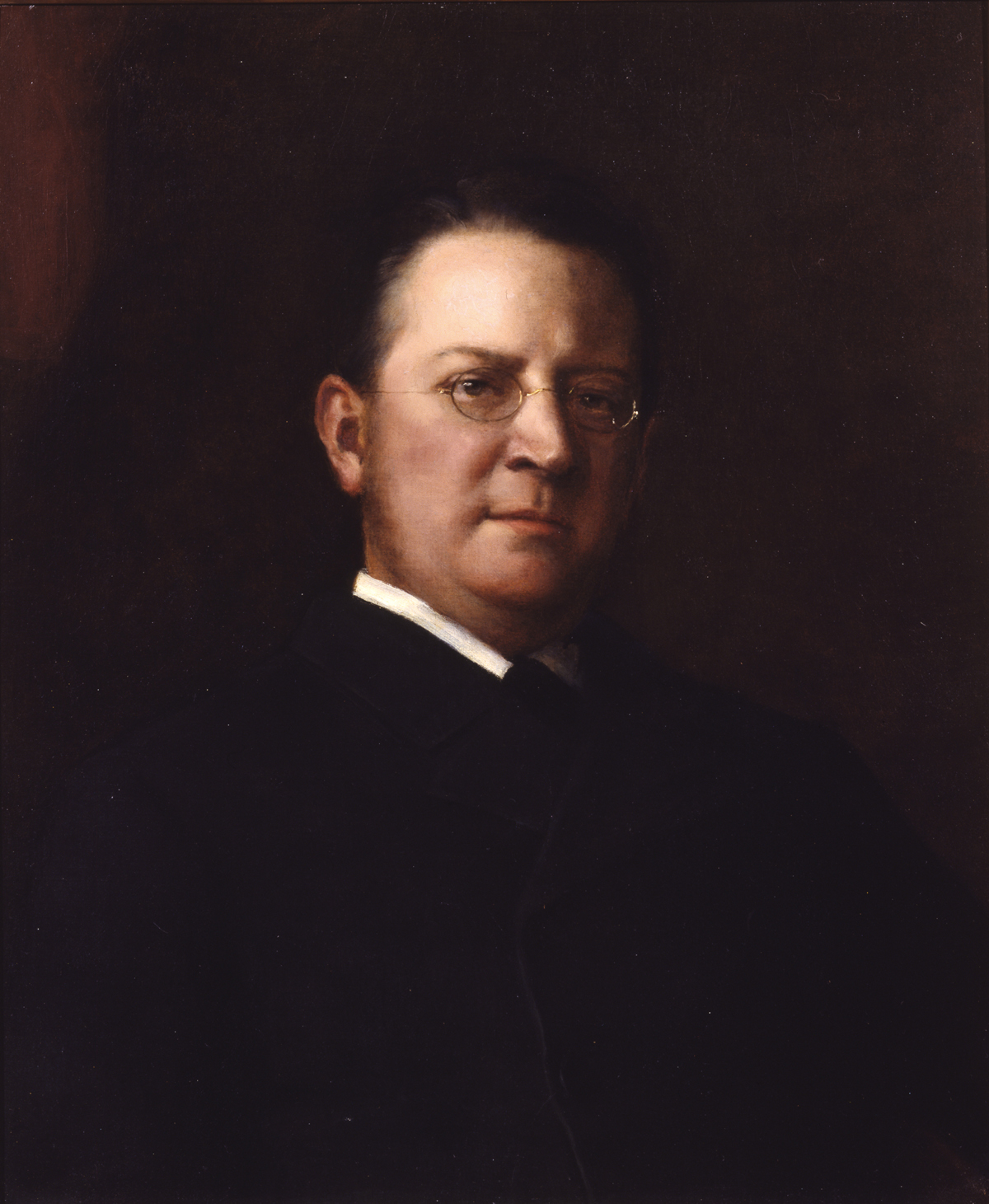
- William Smoult Playfair, portrait by Susanne von Nathusius (1882)
- Born: 27 July 1836; St Andrews, Scotland
- Died: 13 August 1903 (aged 67); St Andrews, Scotland
- Education: University of Edinburgh
- Occupation: Obstetrician
- Relatives: Sir Lambert Playfair; Lyon Playfair, 1st Baron Playfair
- Medical career
- Institutions: King's College Hospital

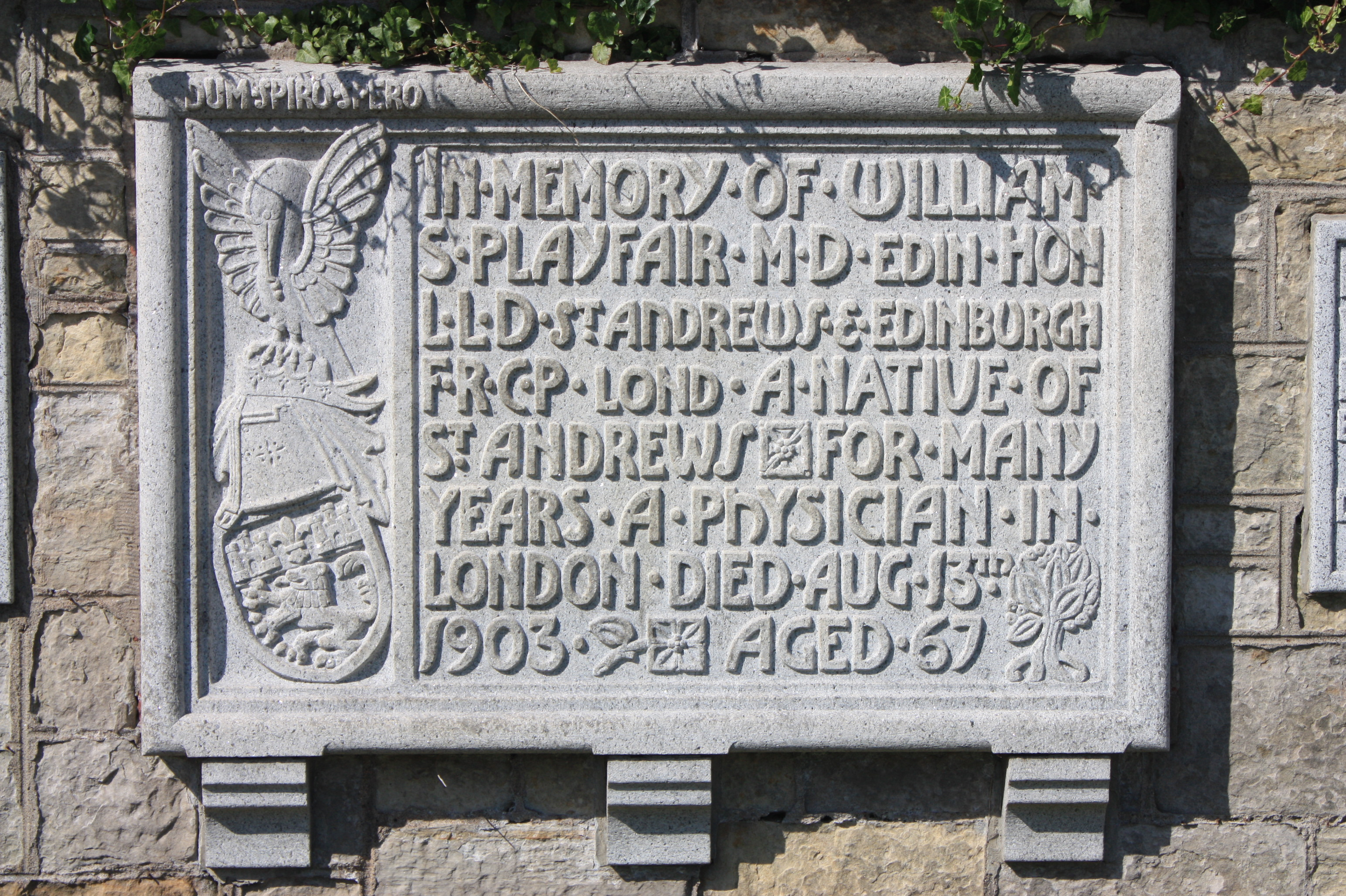
The grave of William Playfair, St Andrews Cemetery

Dr William Smoult Playfair FRCP (27 July 1836 – 13 August 1903) was a leading Scottish obstetric physician and academic. In 1896 a trial, Kitson v. Playfair, found against him for a breach of medical confidentiality.

== Biography ==
Playfair was born in St Andrews on 27 July 1836, the fourth of the five sons of Jessie (née Ross) of Edinburgh and George Playfair, inspector-general of hospitals in Bengal and son of James Playfair (1738–1819). Lyon Playfair, 1st Baron Playfair and Robert Lambert Playfair were among his brothers. He was educated in St Andrews before going on to study medicine at the University of Edinburgh in 1852. He graduated with an M.D. in 1856, presenting the thesis "Calculus of the bladder among the natives of India" He worked for some time in Paris.

In 1857 Playfair entered the Indian Medical Service, and was an assistant surgeon at Awadh during the Indian Rebellion. From 1859-60 he was professor of surgery at the Calcutta Medical College; but left for reasons of health. He practised medicine for six months in St. Petersburg before returning to London in 1863 with no definite plans.

Playfair was shortly elected assistant physician for diseases of women and children at King's College Hospital. In 1872, on the retirement of Sir William Overend Priestley, he was appointed professor of obstetric medicine at King's College, London, and obstetric physician to King's College Hospital, posts which he gave up in 1898 after 25 years of service. He was then elected emeritus professor and consulting physician at King's College.

Playfair introduced the bed rest treatment of Silas Weir Mitchell into the United Kingdom. He was obstetrician to the Duchess of Edinburgh and the Duchess of Connaught.

He received honorary doctorates from the universities of Edinburgh (1898) and St Andrews (1885). He was made an honorary fellow of the American and Boston gynaecological societies, and the Edinburgh Obstetrical Society. He was elected President of the Obstetrical Society of London in 1879.

In 1863 he became MRCP and in 1870 was elected FRCP.

After a suffering a stroke in Florence in 1903, Playfair returned home to St Andrews and died there on 13 August 1903. He was buried there in the new (eastern) cemetery in the town, against the central dividing wall (near the large monument to John Tulloch). He had become a leading obstetrician in the United Kingdom, and was among the first not hand over obstetric operations to general surgeons. A sum was collected to found a memorial to him in the new King's College Hospital at Denmark Hill, London.

== Linda Kitson case ==
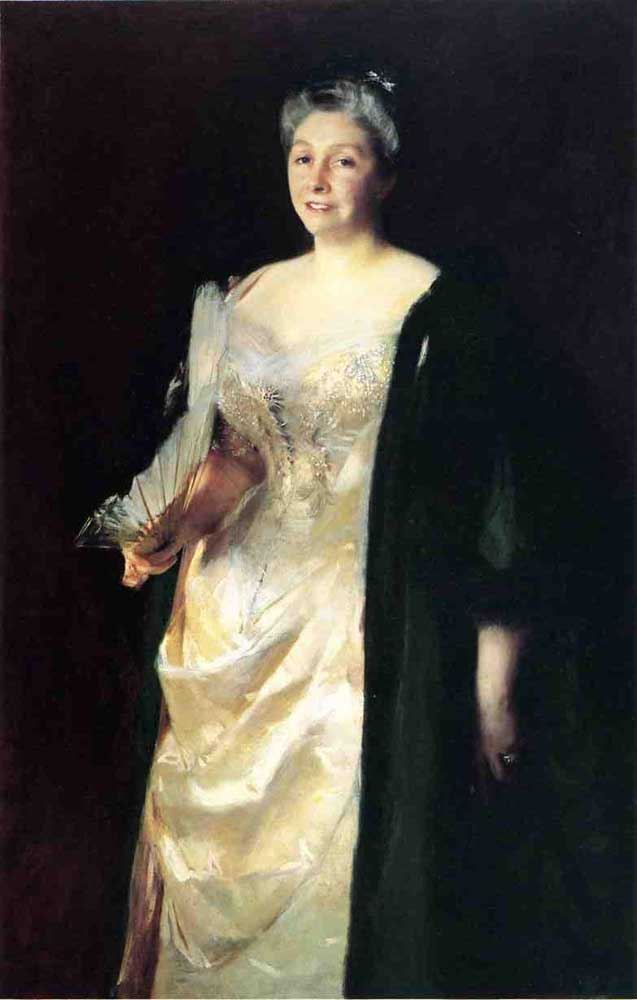
Mrs. William Playfair (née Emily Kitson, 1841-1916), sister of James Kitson, 1st Baron Airedale, by John Singer Sargent, 1887

In 1896 an action was brought against Playfair by a patient, Linda Kitson, for an alleged breach of professional confidence. It is notable for the high damages of £12,000 awarded against him by the jury; this amount was then reduced by agreement to £9,200 on application for a new trial.

Playfair, who was related to Kitson by marriage (she was married to but separated from his wife's younger brother), considered in his professional opinion that she had recently been pregnant. When Playfair decided to exclude female members of his family from her company, on moral grounds, Kitson sued. Leading doctors spoke in court in support of his actions but the judge found them unacceptable, in line with general public opinion on medical confidentiality.

== Works ==
Playfair was a prolific author, and wrote:

- Handbook of Obstetric Operations, 1865.
- Science and Practice of Midwifery, 1876; 9th edit. 1898, translated into several languages.
- Notes on the Systematic Treatment of Nerve Prostration and Hysteria connected with Uterine Disease, 1881.

He was joint editor with Clifford Allbutt of a System of Gynæcology (1896; 2nd edition revised by Thomas Watts Eden, 1906). He contributed to Richard Quain's Dictionary of Medicine (1882) the article on "Diseases of the Womb", and to Daniel Hack Tuke's Dictionary of Psychological Medicine (1892) the article on "Functional Neuroses". His work in medical periodicals included 49 papers for the Transactions of the Obstetrical Society.

== Family ==
On 26 April 1864 Playfair married Emily, daughter of James Kitson of Leeds and sister of James Kitson, 1st Baron Airedale. Together they had three daughters and two sons, one of them being Nigel Ross Playfair, the actor-manager.
