= James Playfair (minister) =

Scottish minister, academic and author (1736–1819)

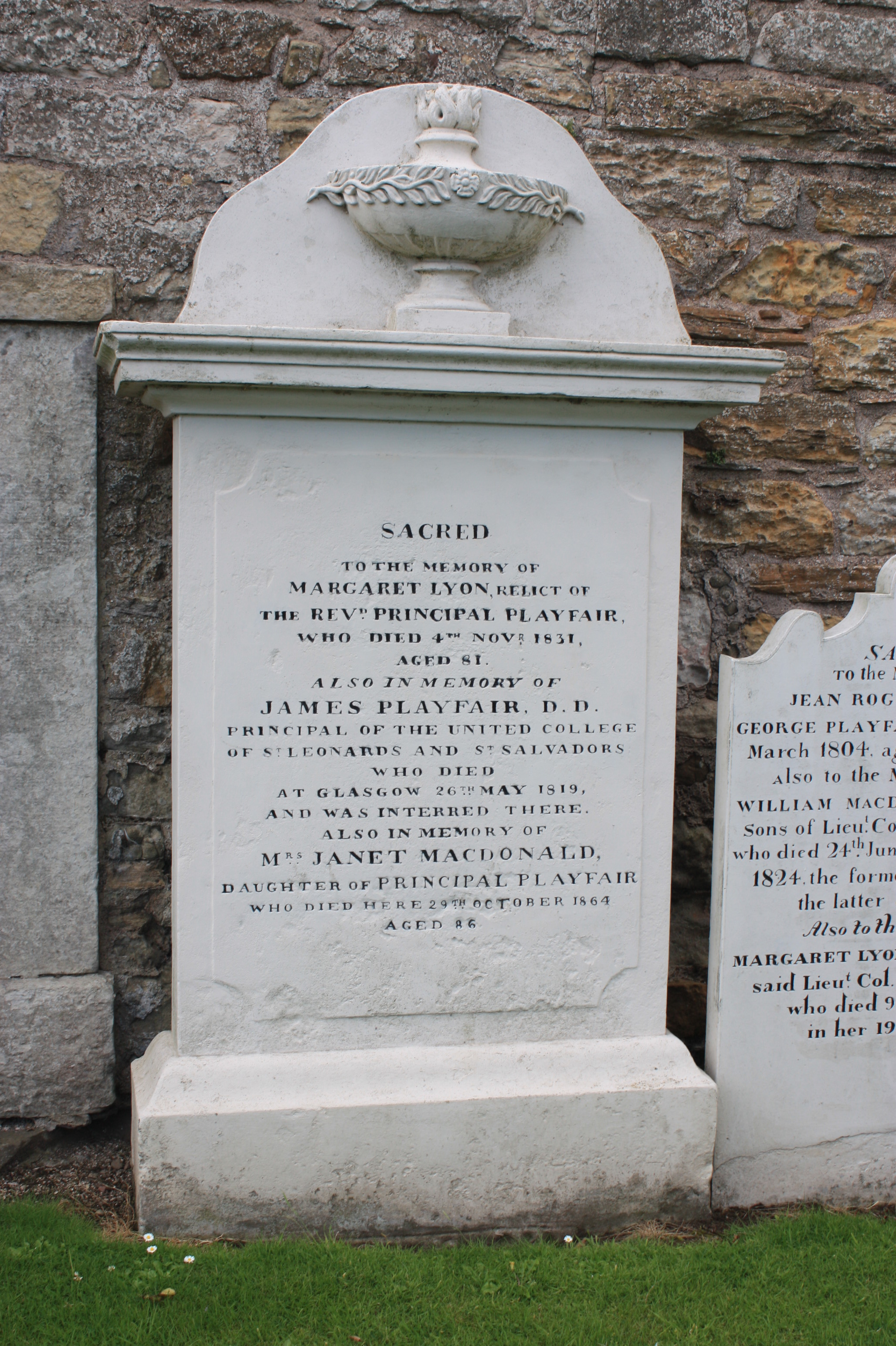
The memorial to Rev James Playfair, St Andrews Cathedral churchyard

James Playfair FRSE (1736–1819) was a Scottish minister, academic and author and a figure in the Scottish Enlightenment.

== Life ==
He was born on 7 December 1736 at Knowhead of Bendochy (a farm) in Perthshire the son of George Playfair (d. 1786), a farmer, and his wife, Jean Roger (d. 1804).

He studied at St Andrews University and was ordained as minister of Newtyle (1770–77), then translated to Meigle (1777–1800). He was appointed Principal of St Andrews University in 1800. During this period he was also minister of St Leonard's Church in St Andrews.

In 1779 St Andrews awarded him an honorary doctorate (DD). In 1787 he was elected a Fellow of the Royal Society of Edinburgh. His proposers were John Playfair (a distant cousin) and Alexander Fraser Tytler.

He was the official historiographer of the then Prince of Wales.

He died at Dalmarnock near Glasgow on 26 May 1819. He is buried in Glasgow but is also memorialised on the grave of his wife in the churchyard of St Andrews Cathedral.

== Family ==
In September 1773 he married Margaret Lyon (1751–1831), daughter of Rev George Lyon of Longforgan. Their ten children included Sir Hugh Lyon Playfair.

He was paternal grandfather to Lyon Playfair, 1st Baron Playfair through his son George Playfair.

== Publications ==
- A System of Chronology (1782)
- A System of Geography Ancient and Modern (1810–14)
- General Atlas Ancient and Modern (1814)
- A Geographical and Statistical Description of Scotland (1819);

== Sources ==
- Papers of Robert Lambert Playfair and other members of the Playfair family Catalogue record at archiveshub.ac.uk
