= James Kitson (businessman) =

English cricketer and businessman (1807 – 1885)

Personal information
- Full name: James Kitson
- Born: 27 October 1807; Leeds, Yorkshire, England
- Died: 30 June 1885 (aged 77); Leeds, Yorkshire, England
- Batting: Unknown

Domestic team information
- Years: Team
- 1832: Marylebone Cricket Club

Career statistics
Competition	First-class
Matches	1
Runs scored	1
Batting average	0.50
100s/50s	–/–
Top score	1
Catches/stumpings	1/–
- Source: Cricinfo, 3 November 2021

James Kitson (27 October 1807 – 30 June 1885) was an English first-class cricketer and early railway industrialist, founding the locomotive builders Kitson and Company.

== Early life ==
The son of a publican, he was born in his father's pub, the Brunswick Tavern, in Leeds in October 1807. He acquired some level of education at local schools in Leeds, with Kitson helping out in the family pub as a young child. At 14 he was apprenticed at a local dyeworks, where he acquired a bad injury. Despite his injury he was determined to improve himself and was fascinated by the new emerging railway technology. Kitson joined the newly founded Leeds Mechanical Institute, where he studied chemistry, mathematics and mechanics. He then undertook an apprenticeship at Fenton, Murray and Wood in Leeds, before briefly gaining employment under Robert Stephenson with his company, Robert Stephenson and Company, at Newcastle. He counted the elder George Stephenson among his close friends.

== Career ==
In 1835, Kitson decided to form his own locomotive engineering company. Enlisting the help of Charles Todd and David Laird, together the trio founded Todd, Kitson and Laird in a former cloth mill. Within a month of founding the company they received a lucrative order for locomotives from the Liverpool and Manchester Railway, with the company producing LMR 57 Lion. The company would go on to produce locomotives for 103 years, finally ceasing operations in 1938.

== Cricket ==
Kitson played first-class cricket for the Marylebone Cricket Club (MCC) against Oxford University at Oxford. Batting twice in the match, he was dismissed in the MCC first innings by Francis Popham, while in their second innings he was dismissed for a single run, being caught by Henry Knatchbull off an unrecorded bowler.

== Politics ==
He served as the Mayor of Leeds from 1860 to 1862, in addition to serving on the Leeds Town Council for many years.

== Religion ==
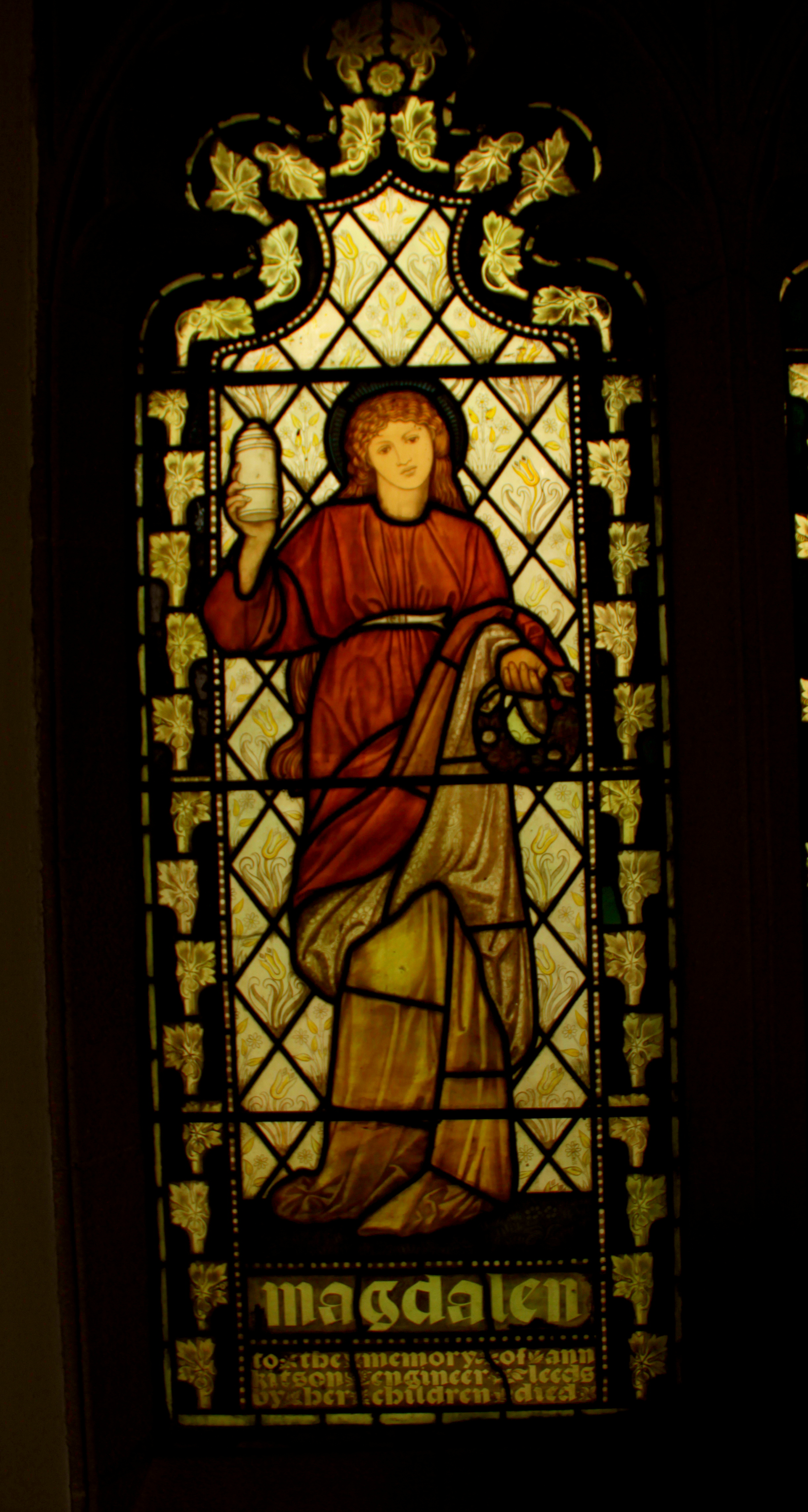
Mill Hill Chapel Leeds E (4)

The Kitsons were closely associated with Unitarianism in Leeds, at Mill Hill Chapel, with Kitson giving lectures to working women on hygiene as part of his missionary work. William Morris was commissioned to create a stained glass window there in honour of Ann Kitson, who died in 1865.

== Marriages and children ==
At the age of 21 he married Ann Newton, with the couple having 11 children, though only six survived to adulthood. One son, also named James, followed in his father's footsteps by becoming a locomotive builder, in addition to becoming a politician and the 1st Baron Airedale. Another son, Arthur Octavius Kitson, was involved in a notorious court case with his brother-in-law William Smoult Playfair, an eminent obstetrician.

After his second marriage, Kitson bought Elmete Hall, in the vicinity of what is now Roundhay Park, to the north of Leeds. He and his wife Elizabeth raised four children there. He died at Elmete Hall on 30 June 1885. His life is documented by the Thoresby Society, the historical society for Leeds.
