= St Regulus Hall =

- Crest of St Regulus Hall
- Interactive map of the St Regulus Hall area
- Alternative names: Regs

General information
- Type: Student residence
- Architectural style: Scottish Baronial
- Location: Queen's Gardens; St Andrews; Fife; KY16 9TQ, St Andrews, Fife, Scotland
- Coordinates: 56.337228°N 2.794832°W
- Completed: 1868
- Renovated: 1928; 1950
- Owner: University of St Andrews

Design and construction
- Architect: George Rae

Website
- St Regulus Hall

St Regulus' Hall (known fondly as Reg's) is a hall of residence at the University of St Andrews in St Andrews, Fife, Scotland. It is located on Queen's Terrace, nearby to St Mary's College. The hall was built in 1868 and currently accommodates approximately 170 students.

== History ==
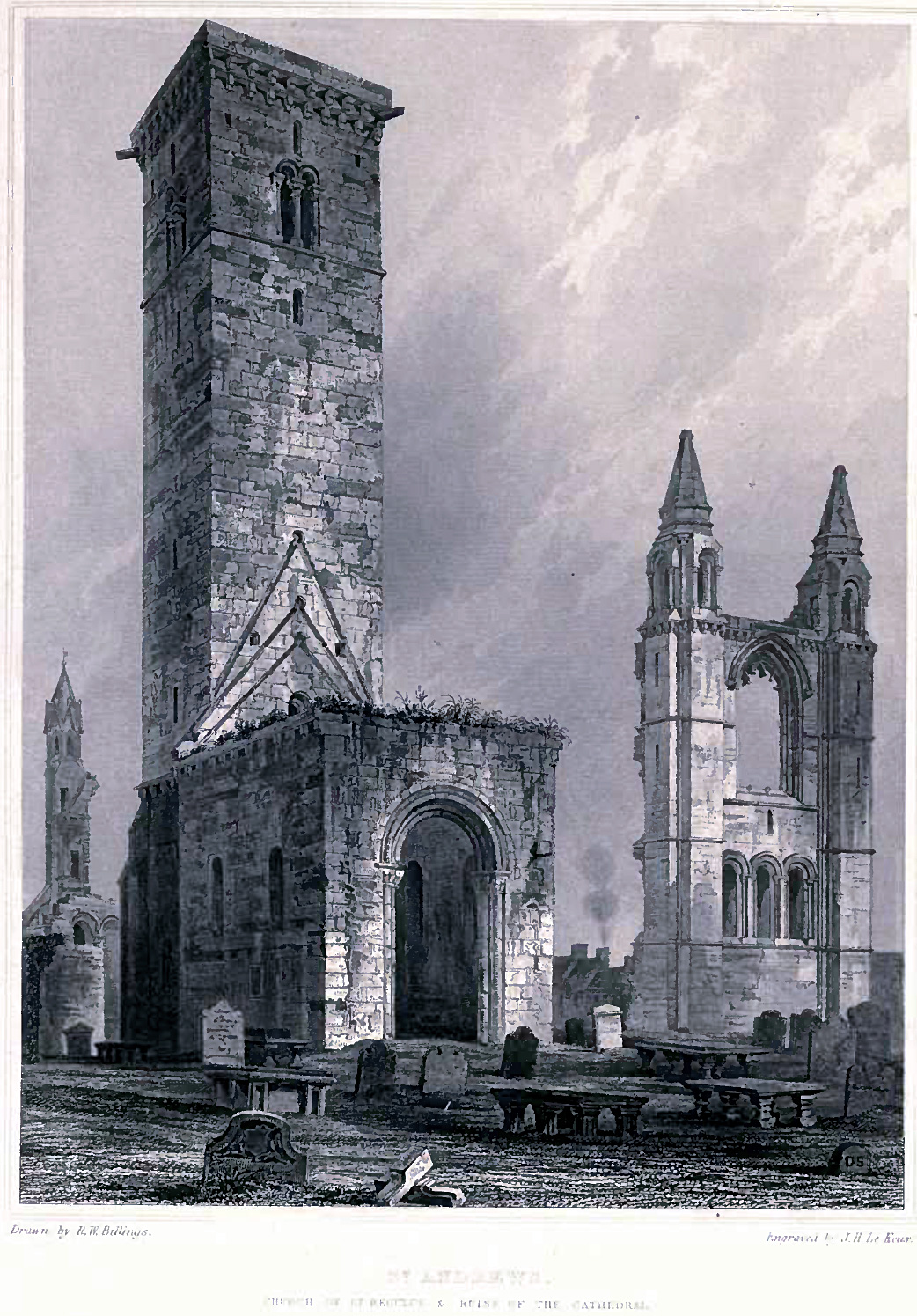
An illustration of St Rule (St Regulus) Tower

The building that would become St Regulus Hall was built in 1868 by architect George Rae as a hotel – it is said that it would have remained as such had it not become a hub for local prostitutes. It was acquired by the University of St Andrews in the 1950s in order to accommodate the increasing student population, and was extensively refurbished and extended.

The hall is named after Saint Regulus, a 4th-century Greek Monk who brought the bones of Saint Andrew to the town of St Andrews, after becoming convinced that the Emperor Constantine would move them from Patras to Constantinople. St Regulus' feast day in the Aberdeen Breviary is 17 October, and at St Regulus Hall this is celebrated annually.

The Crest of St Regulus Hall also references the legend of St Regulus; including the ship he sailed to St Andrews in, the bones of St Andrew he brought with him, and St Rule's (St Regulus) tower. It also features the red lion on the University of St Andrews' own crest. The crest was updated in April 2020 to improve the image quality. The Hall Colours are red and black, matching the crest.

== Facilities ==
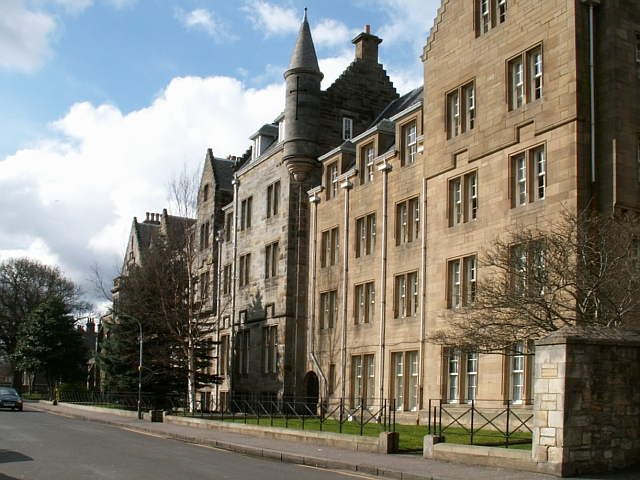
St Regulus Hall as viewed from Queen's Terrace

St Regulus Hall accommodates approximately 170 students, in 98 single rooms and 37 shared rooms. Students are drawn predominantly from first years, but some second, third and final year students continue to reside in hall. St Regulus is a catered hall that serves 19 meals a week in the dining hall. St Regulus Hall also contains a library, computer room, Common Room, sports facilities and student kitchens.

== Events & Traditions ==
Within St Regulus Hall, events and traditions are the responsibility of the wardens and the elected hall committee. These include the events of Freshers Week, which always involve the traditional charity auction, ceilidh and party. Other notable events include St Regulus Day, which is usually accompanied by a formal dinner and a party, Christmas Ball, and St Regulus Hall Ball, which takes place on the last weekend of teaching in second semester. Following Hall Ball, the next year's committee take over the running of events. The year always ends with Final Fling, a party at the end of examinations. This traditionally took place in The Lizard; following its closure, the event now occurs in St Regulus Hall and/or at the Students Association.

== Student Committee ==
The Student Committee of St Regulus Hall is the elected body of student representatives responsible for in-hall events, charity work, sports, wellbeing and environmental issues. The majority of the positions are elected annually in April. The Committees' role in hall life is a well-established tradition at the university.

== Notable residents ==
- Bethwell Allan Ogot
- Lucinda Russell OBE
