= James Gillespie (minister) =

Scottish minister and theologian

James Gillespie FRSE (1722–1791) was a Scottish minister and theologian. He was Moderator of the General Assembly of the Church of Scotland in 1779. He was a cofounder of the Royal Society of Edinburgh in 1783.

== Life ==
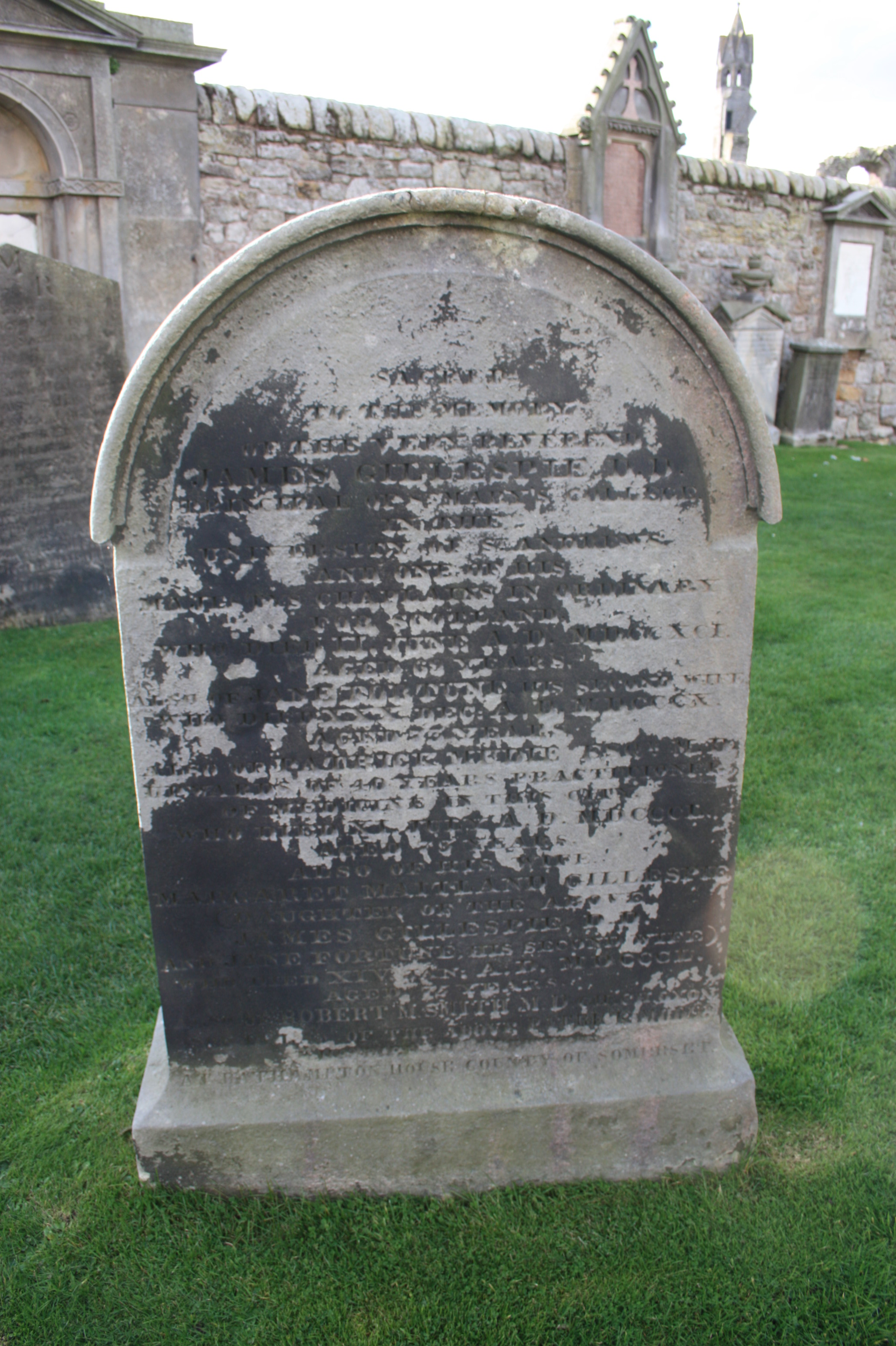
The grave of Very Rev James Gillespie, St Andrews Cathedral graveyard

He was the son of Rev James Gillespie, minister of Arngask.

He attended Dundee Grammar School, and graduated from St Leonard's College, St Andrews BA in 1740, and MA in 1741. Thereafter, he studied divinity.

He was licensed to preach by the Presbytery of Perth in August 1745. He became a chaplain at Melvil then was ordained at Abdie in March 1747. He was translated to Dunbarney in March 1751. In November 1757 he was made minister of the second charge at St Andrews, becoming minister of the first charge in 1765. In November 1768 the university awarded him a doctorate of divinity (DD).

In 1779 he became Principal of St Mary's College, St Andrews, replacing the Very Rev Prof James Murison. He was elected Moderator in the same year. In 1786 he was made a Chaplain to the King at the Chapel Royal.

He died on 2 June 1791. He is buried in the graveyard of St Andrews Cathedral. The grave lies to the south-west of the central tower.

== Family ==
His brother Rev Laurence Gillespie was minister of Auchtermuchty.

He married twice, firstly in 1748 to Isobel Dick, daughter of Rev William Dick of Cupar, and had at least nine children. Following Isobel's death in 1770, in 1772 he married Jean Fortoun (d.1810) with whom he had at least four more children.

He was father of Jane Gillespie and Robert Gillespie Smyth WS.
