= Peter Redford Scott Lang =

Scottish mathematician and Regius Professor

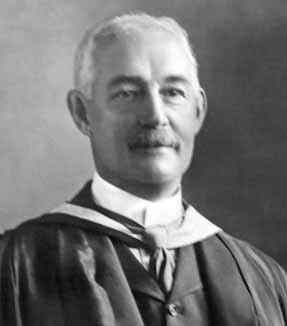

Sir Peter Redford Scott Lang VD FRSE (1850–1926) was a Scottish mathematician and Regius Professor at the University of St Andrews. In the 1880s he instituted “Common Dinners” to bring the students together for joint meals (often referred to as “commies”). This had a major impact upon student social life and was thereafter adopted by several Scottish universities. In memory of this the University of St Andrews holds an annual Scott Lang Dinner.

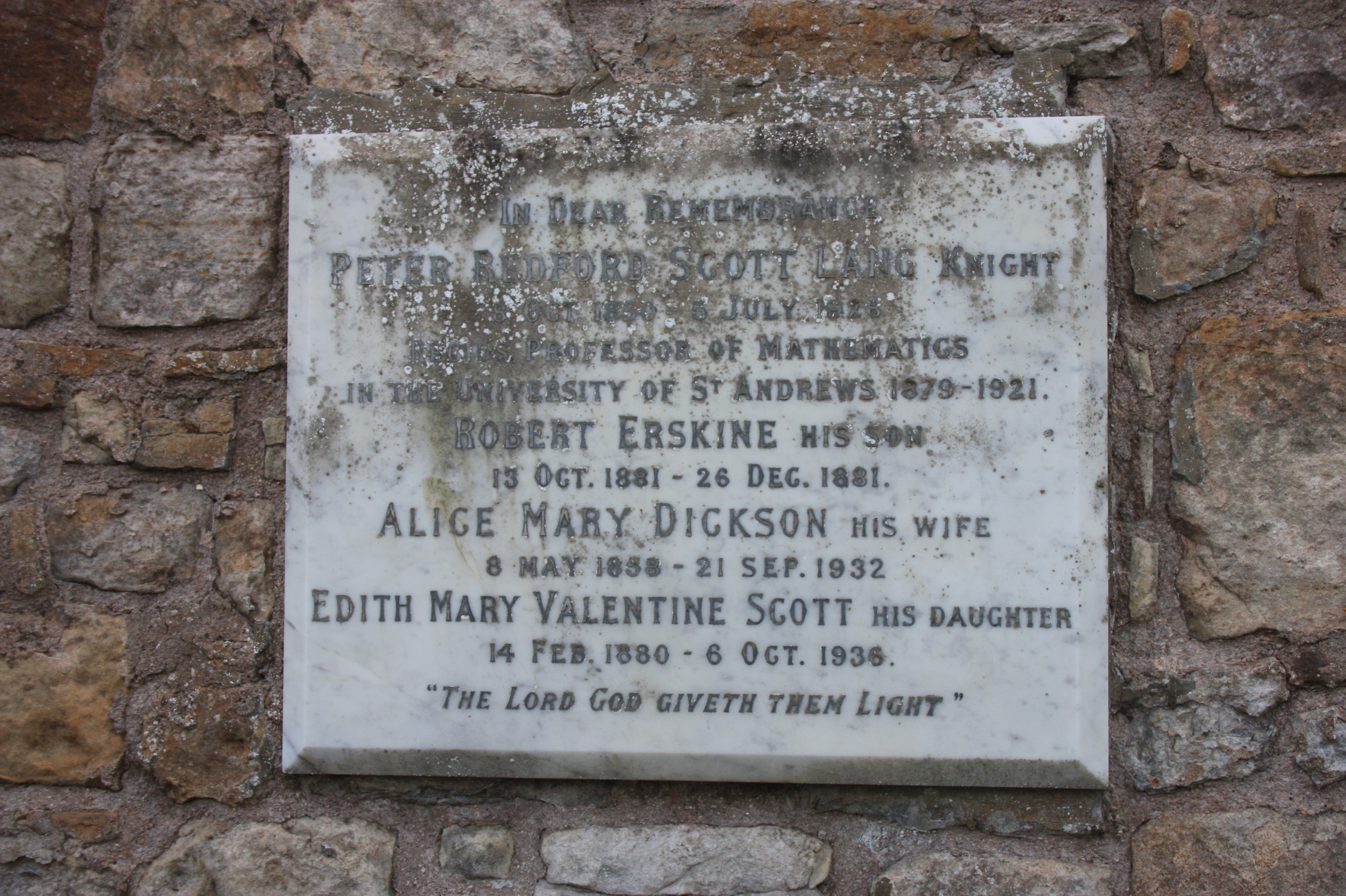
The grave of Sir Peter Redford Scott Lang, St Andrews Cathedral graveyard

== Life ==
He was born in Edinburgh on 8 October 1850, the youngest of six children of Barbara Turnbull (née Cochrane) and Robert Laidlaw Lang (b.1808), an advocate’s clerk. They lived at 125 Fountainbridge in the south-west of the city. He was educated at the Edinburgh Institution (now known as Stewarts Melville College) and then studied mathematics and natural philosophy (physics) at the University of Edinburgh. His university studies were interspersed with training as a life assurance clerk. He graduated MA BSc in 1872 and began assisting in lectures in natural philosophy at the University of Edinburgh.

In 1878 he was elected a Fellow of the Royal Society of Edinburgh. His proposers were Sir Robert Christison, Peter Guthrie Tait, David Stevenson, and John Hutton Balfour. In 1879 he moved to the University of St Andrews as Professor of Mathematics. During his time at St Andrews he purchased a house on South Street. He rose to also be Dean of the Faculty of Arts within the University.

He was a Lieutenant Colonel in the 1st Fifeshire Royal Garrison Artillery, a volunteer battalion based at the no 7 battery at Anstruther. He had served as a volunteer for at least 20 years, gaining the Victorian Officer’s Decoration (VD) in 1900. He was granted the honorary rank of Colonel on 25 October 1902.

He was knighted in 1921 by King George V on the point of his retiral. In 1922 the University of St Andrews awarded him an honorary doctorate (LLD).

He died at home in St Andrews on 5 July 1926. He is buried with his wife and daughter in St Andrews Cathedral Churchyard. The grave lies on a wall to the south of the central tower.

== Family ==
He was married to Alice Mary Dickson (1858-1932) from Colinton. They had one daughter, Edith Mary Valentine Lang (1880-1936).
