= James Murison (moderator) =

Scottish minister

James Murison (c. 1705–1779) was a Scottish minister who served as Principal of St Leonard's College at St Andrews University and Moderator of the General Assembly of the Church of Scotland in 1767.

== Life ==
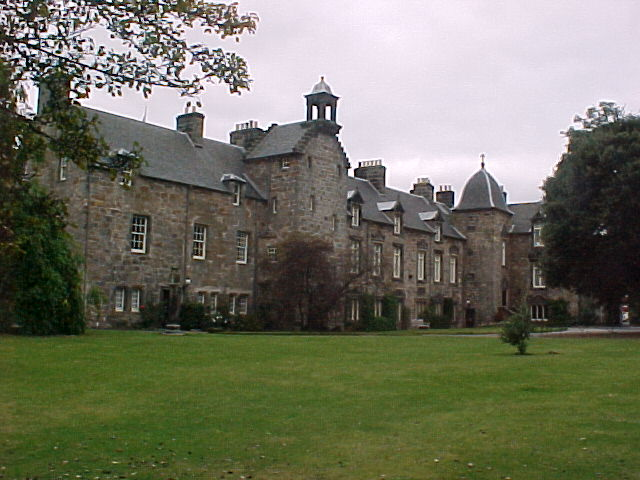
St Mary's College, St Andrews

He was born around 1705 in Kincardineshire. Studying divinity at Kings College, Aberdeen he graduated MA in April 1721. After a long wait for a patron (then essential in the Scottish church), he was proposed as minister of Edzell and Newdosk in June 1729 and accepted and ordained on 17 September 1729. In October 1743, he was translated to Kinnell Church, near Arbroath. In March 1747, he is recorded as having had been robbed at his manse in Kinnell.

In September 1747, he left the ministry to become principal of St Marys College, St Andrews and in March 1748 became rector of St Andrews University.

In 1779, he is recorded as being in very poor health. He died on 30 July 1779. His position at St Andrews University was succeeded by Rev Dr James Gillespie.

== Family ==
On 12 October 1744, he married Annabella Trent (died 1761) in Leuchars in Fife. She was his second wife.

His children included James Murison of Denbrae (c. 1740 – 1803 Mid Calder), a child from his first marriage.
