= Saint Regulus =

Legendary Greek saint in Scotland

Bishop of Patras
- Venerated in: Roman Catholic Church; Eastern Orthodox Church
- Major shrine: St Regulus Church
- Feast: 17 October

Saint Regulus or Saint Rule (Old Irish: Ríagal) was a legendary 4th century monk or bishop of Patras, Greece who in AD 345 is said to have fled to Scotland with the bones of Saint Andrew, and deposited them at St Andrews. His feast day in the Aberdeen Breviary is 17 October.

== Biography ==
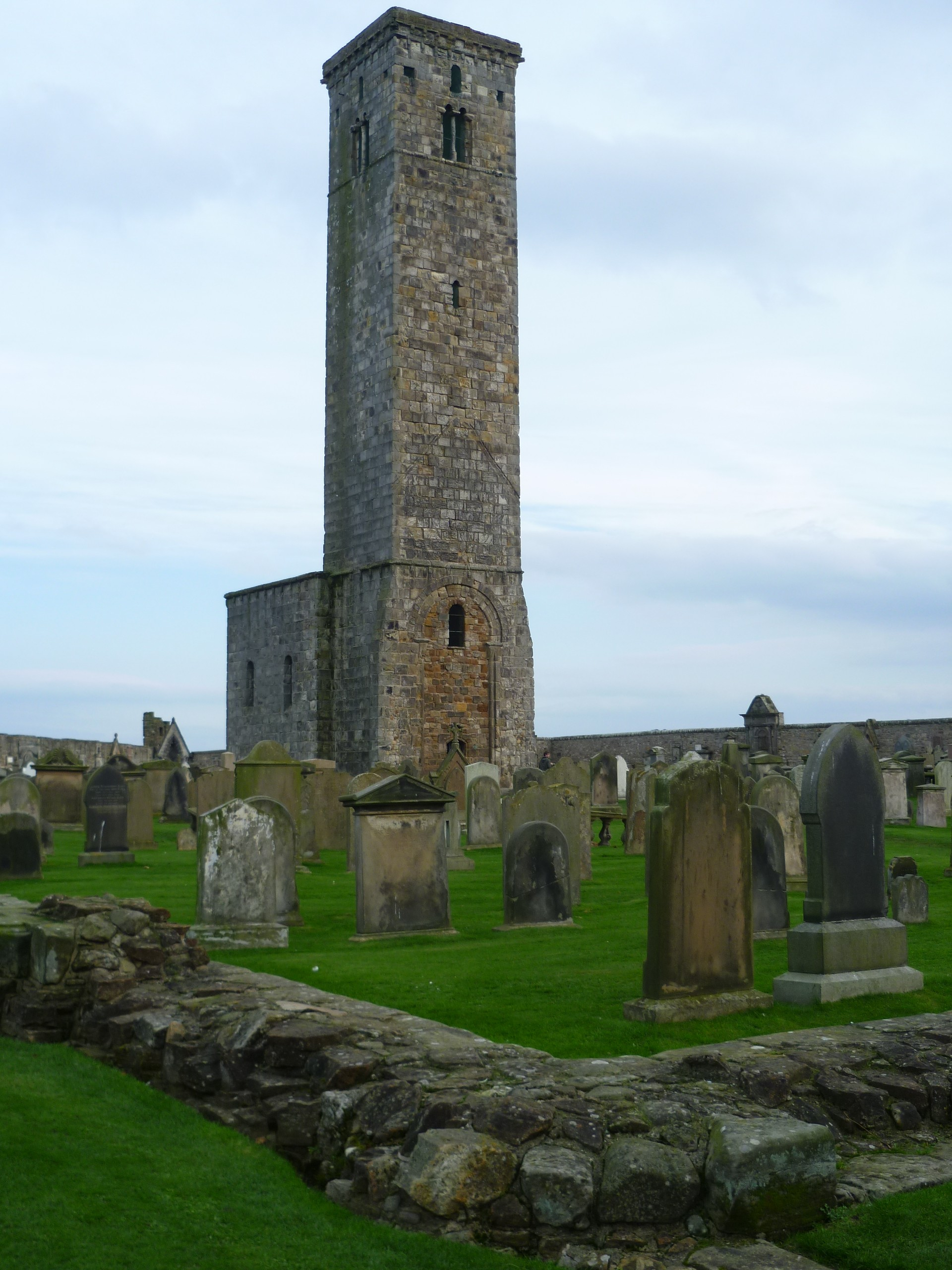
Tower of St. Rule's Church at St Andrews

The details of Saint Regulus' life are unclear and differ in the several extant accounts. Saint Regulus was a monk or bishop of the city of Patras, in present-day Greece, then part of the Roman Empire. In AD 345 Regulus was told by an angel in a visionary dream that the Emperor Constantine had decided to remove Saint Andrew's relics from Patras to Constantinople, and in some retellings that Constantine was about to invade Patras. For safekeeping Regulus was to move as many bones as far away as he could to the western ends of the earth, where he should found a church dedicated to St Andrew. He was accompanied on his voyage by a number of consecrated virgins, among these Saint Triduana.

According to the various accounts Regulus was either shipwrecked or told by an angel to stop intentionally on the shores of Fife at the spot called Kilrymont, a Pictish settlement which is now St. Andrews. Here he was welcomed by a Pictish king, Óengus I (who was actually of the eighth century). Regulus is claimed to have brought three fingers of the saint's right hand, the upper bone of an arm, one kneecap, and one of his teeth.

== Legacy ==
In approximately 1070 Robert I, Prior of St Andrews built St Regulus Church in the town of St Andrews in order to house the relics of St Andrew that Regulus had supposedly brought to the town. It would serve as a landmark for the many pilgrims that would come to the area in the next few centuries. Its main architectural feature is its 33-metre-tall (108 ft) tower, and the Catholic church itself is now principally known in the town as St Rule's tower.

The legend of St Regulus came to have political significance in the later Middle Ages. It served to authenticate the apostle Andrew as patron saint of Scotland. The Regulus legend was publicised by Scottish kings, nobles and churchmen from the 12th century onwards. Scottish independence had come under threat from England since the late 11th century, and the Scottish church was contesting a claim to primacy by the archbishop of York. By promoting the story of Saint Andrew's choice of Scotland in the 4th century, the Scots acquired an important saint, a separate identity from England, and a date for the supposed foundation of the Scottish Catholic Church which predated the foundation of the English and Irish churches by several centuries. Furthermore, during the wars of Scottish Independence the Scots used the legend to persuade Pope Boniface VIII to issue the papal bull of 1299 which demanded that Edward I of England end the war against Scotland. The legend would also lead to the adoption of the saltire on the Scottish flag and the importance of the archdiocese of St Andrews in the early Scottish Catholic Church.

St Regulus Hall, the student hall of residence at the University of St Andrews is named after Saint Regulus.

== See also ==
- St Andrew's Cathedral
- Saint Regulus or Rieul, bishop of Reims, died 698.
- Reuel
- Saint Regulus (San Regolo), a 6th-century North African who became a bishop in Italy (see Cerbonius).
