= Way of St Andrews =

The Way of St Andrews (Spanish: El Camino de San Andreas, French: Chemin de Saint-Andrews, German: der Weg von Saint Andrews, Italian: il cammino di Saint Andrews) is a Christian pilgrimage to St Andrews Cathedral in Fife, on the east coast of Scotland, UK, where the relics of the apostle, Saint Andrew, were once kept. A group started a revival in 2012 introducing new routes.

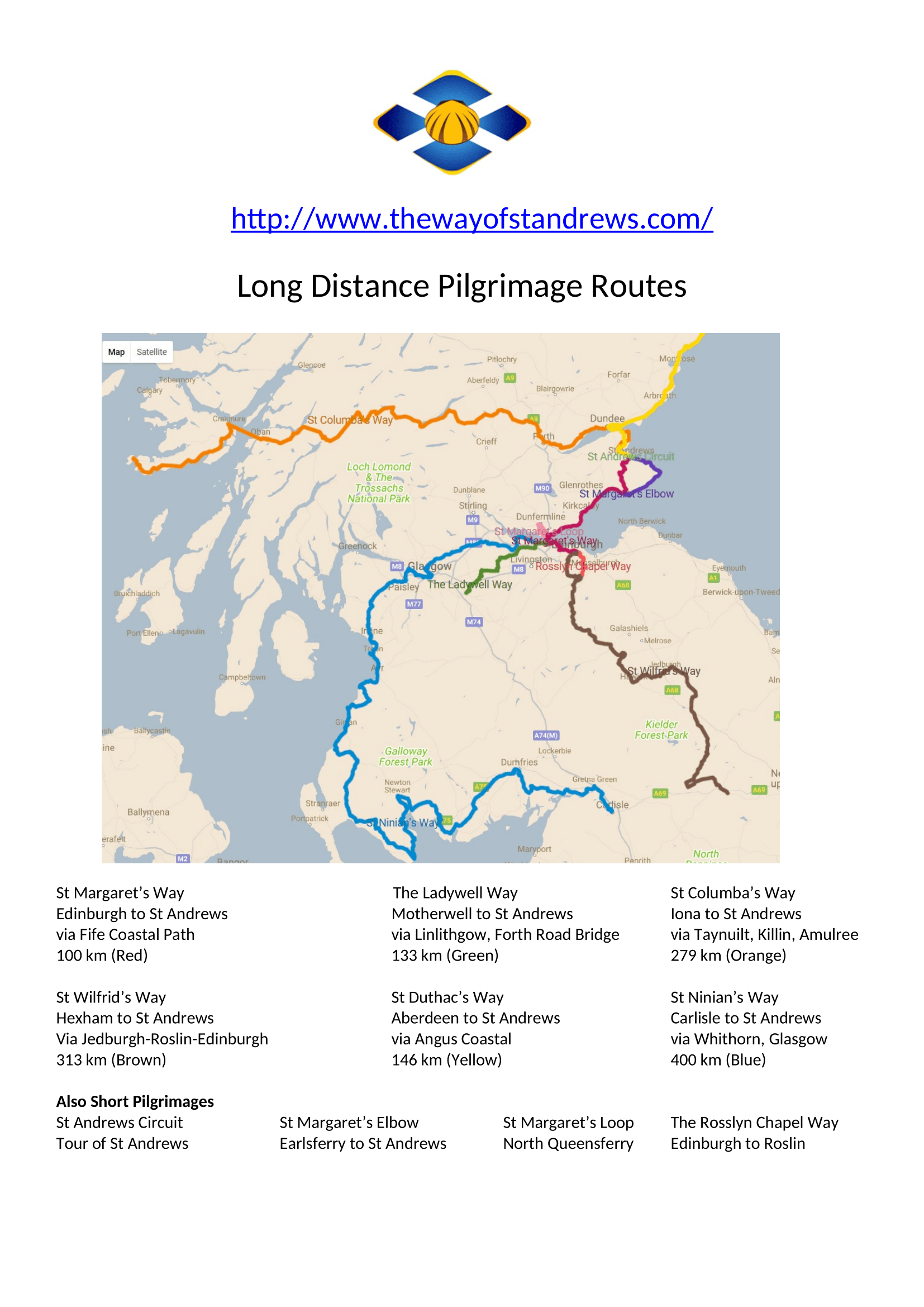
Map of Scotland with pilgrim ways May 4, 2020

== Historic pilgrimage to St Andrews ==
A gloss in the Annals of Ulster indicates that sometime in the mid-sixth century, Cainnech of Aghaboe built a small cell at Cennrigmonaid, an old name for St. Andrews. A church was likely founded around the beginning of the 8th century, probably by Óengus I mac Fergusa. Túathalán (died c. 747) was an 8th-century abbot of Kinrimund monastery. He is known only from his obituary in the Annals of Ulster. Túathalán is the first cleric associated with a church establishment there. Archaeological excavations have shown that from as early as the eighth century, a ferry crossing to Earlsferry, near Elie in Fife was in existence, serving pilgrims on their way to the shrine of Saint Andrew.

Around 877, Causantín mac Cináeda built a new church for the Culdees at Kilrymont.

By the early twelfth century, the town of St Andrews was struggling to cope with the increasing numbers.

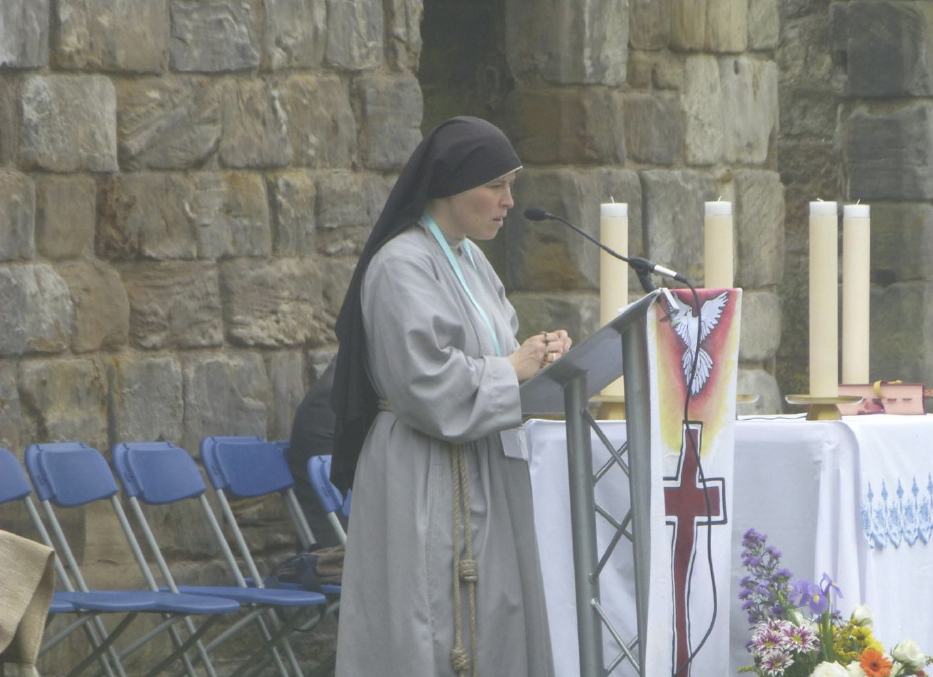
Prayers before open air mass during New Dawn celebrations

At this stage the king, Alexander I of Scotland, recognized the need for a larger church and a system to manage the flow of visiting pilgrims, and gave royal encouragement and funds to Robert, the newly elected bishop. Soon started the building of a great new cathedral complex approached by four main streets from the west, probably an accidental imitation of the shape of the scallop shell, the universal badge of pilgrimage. This cathedral, dominated by the tower to St Rule, became one of the largest buildings in Europe.

Alexander's successor, King David I of Scotland, continued to back the rebuilding of St Andrews and, furthermore, promised royal protection to pilgrims. Numbers steadily increased, mainly from two routes. From the south-east, pilgrims arrived mainly from the continent at North Berwick where they took the ferry to the south coast of Fife arriving at Earlsferry. They travelled the last 15 miles on foot to St Andrews along a track the width of "a donkey with two panniers". From the south, pilgrims arrived at modern South Queensferry and were ferried across the Firth of Forth before proceeding to St Andrews, a journey of around fifty miles.

Pilgrimage began to fall off as wars wracked Scotland and, even more so, with the coming of the Scottish Reformation. In 1559, the Protestant reformer John Knox preached a sermon in St Andrews, urging the pillage and destruction of the cathedral. The relics were removed to safety, but the interior of the cathedral was sacked, and the building was abandoned, to be replaced by a parish church, ending the tradition of pilgrimage. The cathedral was allowed to fall into ruin, and much of its stone was removed for use elsewhere in the proceeding years.

== Revival of the pilgrimage tradition ==
The Way of St Andrews has seen renewed interest, with a recent revival campaign led by lay volunteers from the Roman Catholic Archdiocese of St Andrews and Edinburgh.

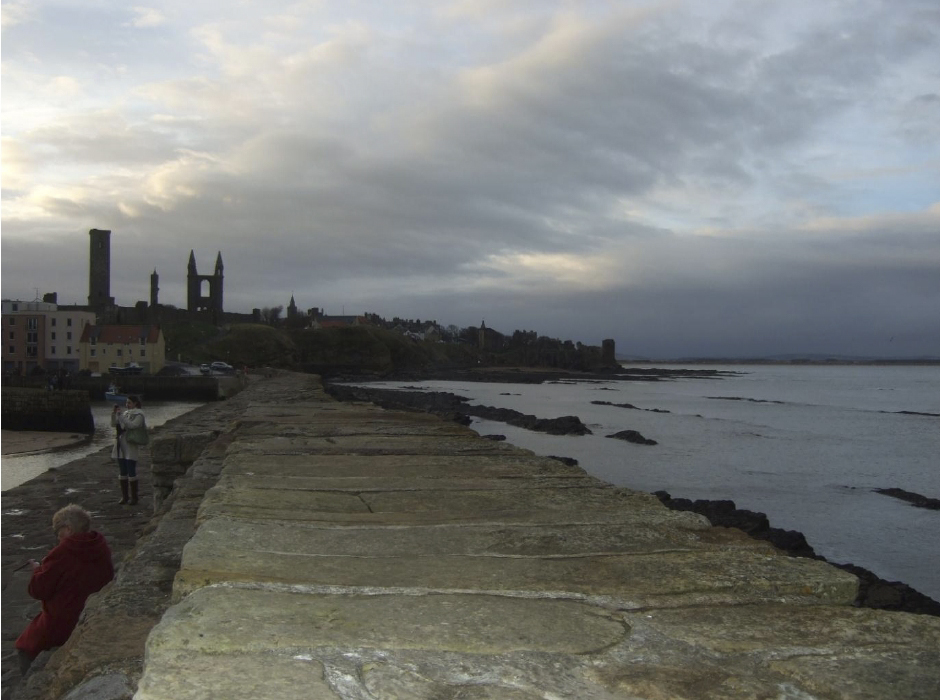
View from St Andrews pier, looking west towards the ruined cathedral

St Margaret's Way, named after the Margaret of Denmark, Queen of Scotland, was blessed and inaugurated in July 2012 during High Mass in Edinburgh's Roman Catholic Metropolitan Cathedral, and, afterwards, the pilgrims congregated round Eduardo Paolozzi's sculpture, "The Big Foot", an allegory for pilgrimage. There were about fifty pilgrims. The pilgrimage finished at St Andrews with an open-air procession and High Mass in the ruins of the cathedral and was covered by the BBC with interviews given by a cardinal and a Presbyterian minister.

== Routes ==
- St Margaret's Way: Edinburgh to St Andrews – 100 kilometres (62 mi)
- St Margaret's Loop: North Queensferry to Dunfermline and back – 19 kilometres (12 mi)
- St Margaret's Elbow : Earlsferry to St Andrews via Fife Ness – 37 kilometres (23 mi)
- St Andrews Circuit: Historical circuit of St Andrews and the cathedral – 6 kilometres (4 mi)
- St Duthac's Way: Aberdeen to St Andrews – 146 kilometres (91 mi). St Duthac's Way, named after St Duthac, an 11th century saint who is commemorated by numerous altars and shrines in Scotland and especially the north-east, starts in Aberdeen and travels to Stonehaven and past Dunnottar Castle. Then the Way goes mainly along the coast through fishing villages and the towns of Montrose and Arbroath to Dundee, then crosses the River Tay and follows the Fife Coastal Path to St Andrews.
- The Rosslyn Chapel Way: Edinburgh (East route) to Rosslyn Chapel – 16 kilometres (10 mi)
- St Columba's Way: Iona to St Andrews – 279 kilometres (173 mi). Named after St Columba who brought Christianity to Scotland, this route travels from the Isle of Iona to St Andrews. Includes two ferry journeys. Very mixed terrain including hilly and rough walking.
- St Ninian's Way: Carlisle to St Andrews via Whithorn and Paisley to St Andrews – 700 kilometres (435 mi). This way, named after St Ninian, the 4th century missionary, starts in Carlisle at the cathedral and goes north to Whithorn and St Ninian's Cave, about 314 kilometres (195 mi). Then the Way goes north and along the Ayrshire coast to Paisley, about 210 kilometres (130 mi). Then into Glasgow and mainly along canal and quiet roads, including a section of the Antonine Wall to Falkirk, Linlithgow and South Queensferry, about 104 kilometres (65 mi). There it picks up St Margaret's Way for the remaining 65 km to St Andrews.
- St Wilfrid's Way: Hexham to Edinburgh, then St Andrews – 250 kilometres (155 mi)
- The Ladywell Way: Motherwell to St Andrews – 58 kilometres (36 mi)

== Bibliography ==
- Scott, Walter. Tales of a Grandfather.
- Mayhew Smith, Nick. Britain's Holiest Places.
- Welch, Sally. Making a Pilgrimage.
- Turnbull, Michael. St Andrew – Scotland's Myth and Identity.
- Burton, Richard. Pilgrimage to Al-Madine and Meccah.
