= James Heriot-Maitland =

Major-General Sir James Heriot-Maitland KCB
- Born: 14 June 1837; Ramornie
- Died: 27 August 1902 (aged 65); St Andrews
- Military career
- Allegiance: United Kingdom
- Branch: British Army
- Service years: 1855–1899
- Rank: Major-General
- Unit: Royal Engineers
- Conflicts: Battle of Canton (1857); Battle of Taku Forts (1859); Battle of Tell El Kebir (1882)
- Awards: Knight Commander of the Bath

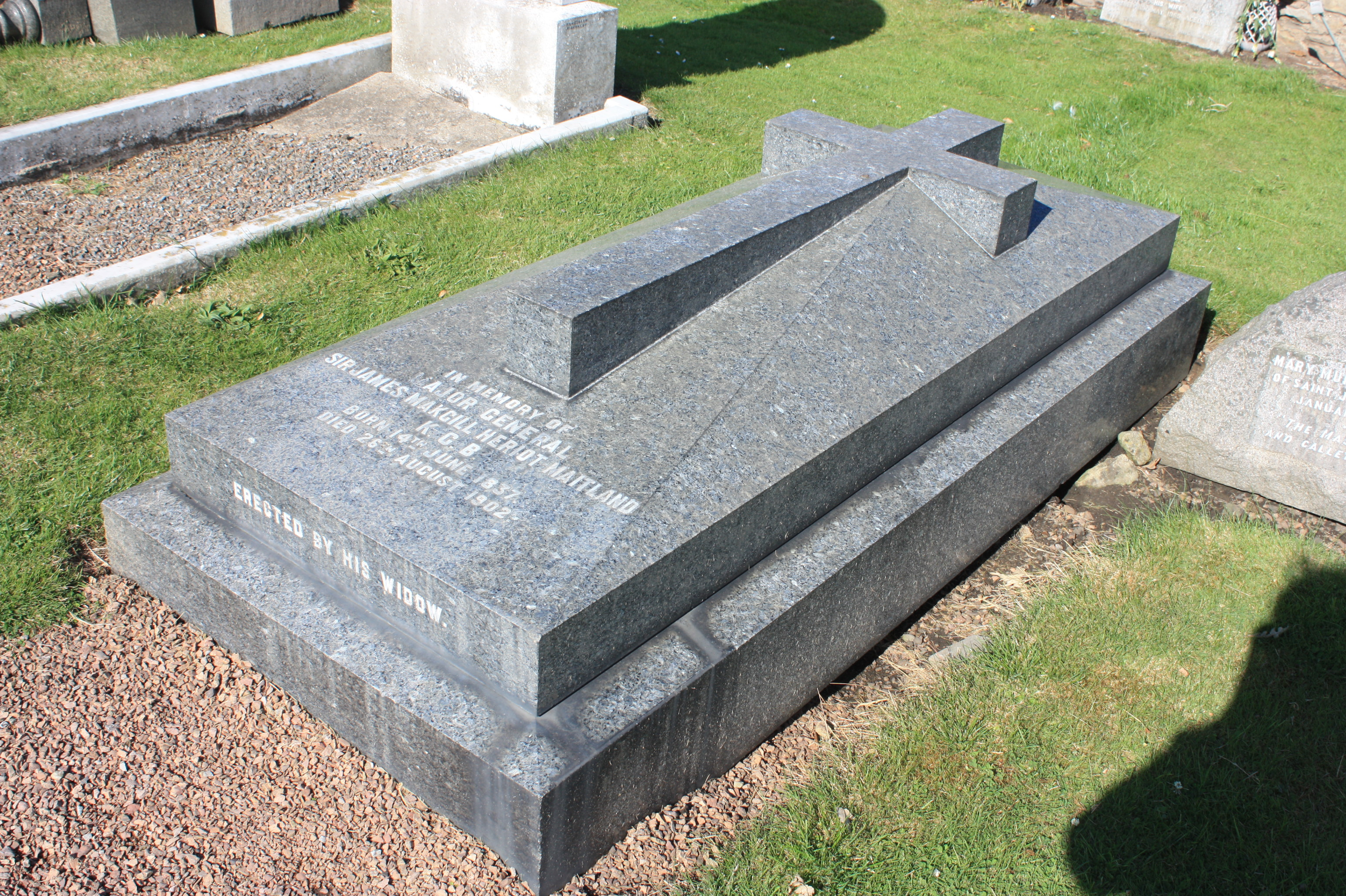
The grave of Sir James Heriot-Maitland, St Andrews Cemetery

Major-General Sir James Makgill Heriot-Maitland, KCB (14 June 1837 – 27 August 1902) was a British Army officer.

== Life ==
Heriot-Maitland was born at Ramornie, Fife in 1837, the youngest son of James Maitland-Heriot, of Ramornie, by his wife Margaret Dalgleish, daughter of William Dalgleish and Janes Isabel Ogilvy. His father was the paternal grandson of Charles Maitland, 6th Earl of Lauderdale.

He was educated privately, and at the Royal Military Academy, Woolwich, and was commissioned a lieutenant in the Royal Engineers on 20 April 1855. He saw active service in the Second Anglo-Chinese War 1857–59, where he took part in the battle of Canton (December 1857) and the storming of Chek-Hung under Sir Charles van Straubenzee. During the second battle of Taku Forts (June 1859), he was in command of the marksmen on board a division of gunboats during the naval action, and in charge of the ladder party when the assault was made over the mud. For his service in the war, he was specially mentioned in dispatches for gallantry and received the Second China War Medal. Promoted captain on 1 April 1862, he served in Canada during the Fenian raids in the late 1860s. He was promoted to major on 5 July 1872 and to lieutenant-colonel on 20 December 1879, during which time he served in the new British Protectorate of Cyprus.

Heriot-Maitland did not see active service again until 1882, when he took part in the Anglo-Egyptian War, and was present at the battle of Tell El Kebir (September 1882), for which he was mentioned in dispatches, received the Egypt Medal with clasp and the 3rd class of the Order of Medjidie, and was appointed a Companion of the Order of the Bath (CB). After promotion to colonel on 20 December 1883, he served in the Nile Expedition 1884–1885, and was attached to the Sudan Frontier Field Force in 1885–1886 as Commanding Royal Engineer in Egypt, in which capacity he acted during the action at Giniss.

From 1886 to 1891 he commanded the Royal Engineers in the Southern district, and he was deputy adjutant-general for that corps from 1891 to 1896, during which he was promoted to major-general on 8 May 1895. In 1896 he was sent to British India on special service, and on his return two years later he was promoted to Knight Commander of the Order of the Bath (KCB). He was placed on the retired list in 1899.

In his obituary in The Times, he is described as a ″great friend of Lord Kitchener″, and a keen golfer, which resulted in him being elected captain of the United Service Golf Club in 1890.

Heriot-Maitland died from heart disease at the Grand Hotel, St Andrews, on 27 August 1902. He is buried beneath a grey granite slab in the eastern extension to St Andrews Cathedral churchyard.

== Family ==
Heriot-Maitland married first, in 1872, to Frances Lorne Mary Campbell, daughter of General Sir John Campbell. After her death in 1876, he married in 1882 Jessie Stewart Hutchings, daughter of Captain George Hutchings, RN. He had two sons (twins) with his first wife, who both followed their father in the army:

- Brigadier-General James Dalgleish Heriot-Maitland (1874–1958), Rifle Brigade (The Prince Consort's Own)
- Major John Campbell Heriot-Maitland (1874–1934)
