= St Andrews Cathedral =

Ruined church in Fife, Scotland

- The Cathedral of St Andrew
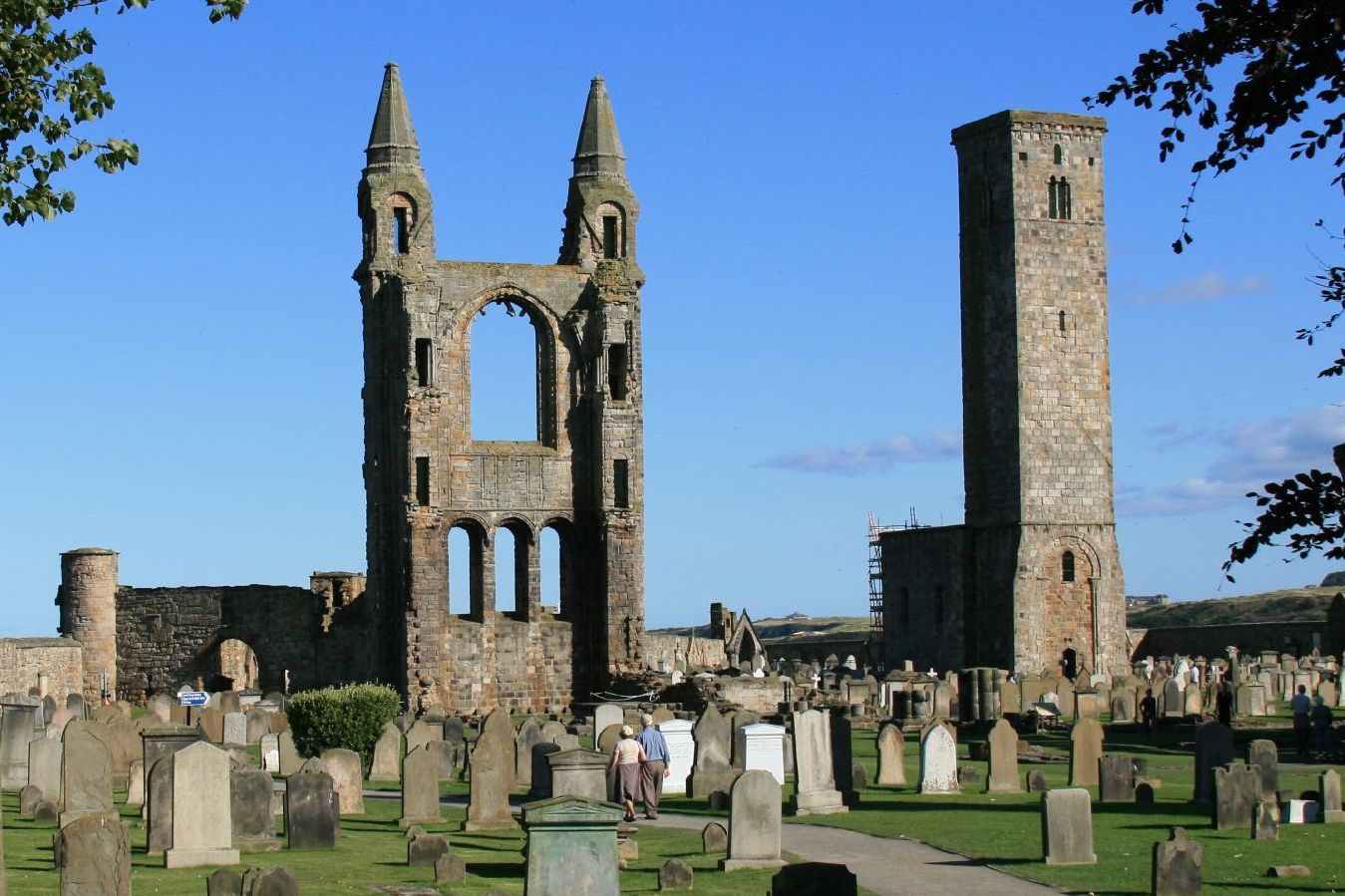
- East tower of St Andrews Cathedral and St Rule's Tower
- St Andrews Cathedral
- 56.3400°N 2.7875°W
- Location: The Pends, St Andrews, Fife KY16 9QL
- Country: Scotland
- Denomination: Catholic

History
- Status: Ruined
- Founded: 1158; 868 years ago
- Founder: Ernald
- Dedication: Andrew the Apostle
- Dedicated: 1318; 708 years ago

Architecture
- Architectural type: Church
- Style: Romanesque, Gothic
- Groundbreaking: 1158
- Completed: 1318
- Closed: 1561; 465 years ago

Specifications
- Length: 391 ft (119 m)
- Width: 168 ft (51 m)
- Height: 100 ft (30 m)

Administration
- Archdiocese: Archdiocese of St Andrews

Scheduled monument
- Official name: St Andrews Cathedral and Priory and adjacent ecclesiastical remains
- Designated: 12 February 1999; 27 years ago
- Reference no.: SM13322

The Cathedral of St Andrew (often referred to as St Andrews Cathedral) is a ruined cathedral in St Andrews, Fife, Scotland. It was built in 1158 and became the centre of the Medieval Catholic Church in Scotland as the seat of the Archdiocese of St Andrews and the Bishops and Archbishops of St Andrews. It fell into disuse and ruin after the Catholic mass was outlawed during the 16th-century Scottish Reformation. It is a monument in the custody of Historic Environment Scotland. The ruins indicate that the building was approximately 119 m (390 ft) long, and is the largest church to have been built in Scotland.

== History ==
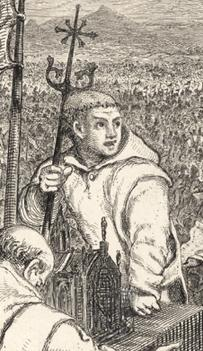
William de Lamberton, Bishop of St Andrews who rebuilt and dedicated the cathedral in 1318

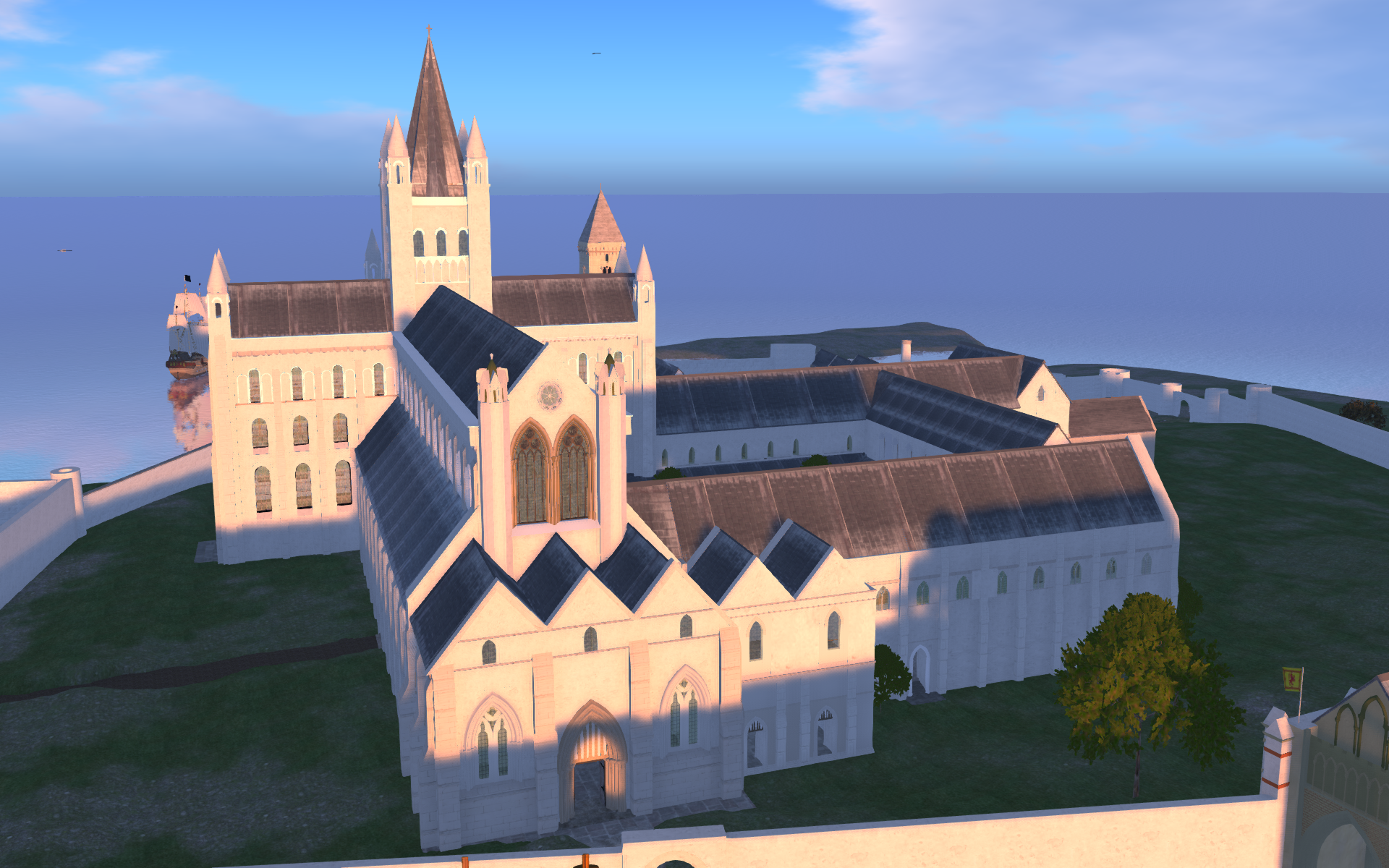
A speculative reconstruction of the cathedral's appearance in 1318

=== Founding and development ===
The cathedral was founded to supply more accommodation than the older church of St. Regulus (St. Rule) afforded. This older church, located on what became the cathedral grounds, had been built in the Romanesque style. Today, there remains the square tower, 33 metres (108 feet) high, and the quire, of very diminutive proportions. On a plan of the town from about 1531, a chancel appears, and seals affixed to the city and college charters bear representations of other buildings attached. To the east is an even older religious site, the Church of St Mary on the Rock, the Culdee house that became a Collegiate Church.

Work began on the new cathedral in 1158 and continued for over a century. The west end was blown down in a storm and rebuilt between 1272 and 1279. In 1304, the cathedral secured 20 oaks from the forest of Clackmannan to repair damage caused by the English army of Edward I. The cathedral was finally completed in 1318 and featured a central tower and six turrets; of these remain two at the east and one of the two at the western extremity, rising to a height of 30 metres (100 feet). On the 5th of July it was consecrated in the presence of King Robert the Bruce, who, according to legend, rode up the aisle on his horse.

The cathedral was served by a community of Augustinian Canons, the St Andrews Cathedral Priory, which were successors to the Culdees of the Celtic church.

Twenty-four of the cathedral's canons, two-thirds of their number, died of bubonic plague in 1348. A fire partly destroyed the building in 1378; restoration and further embellishment were completed in 1440.

=== Abandonment and ruin ===
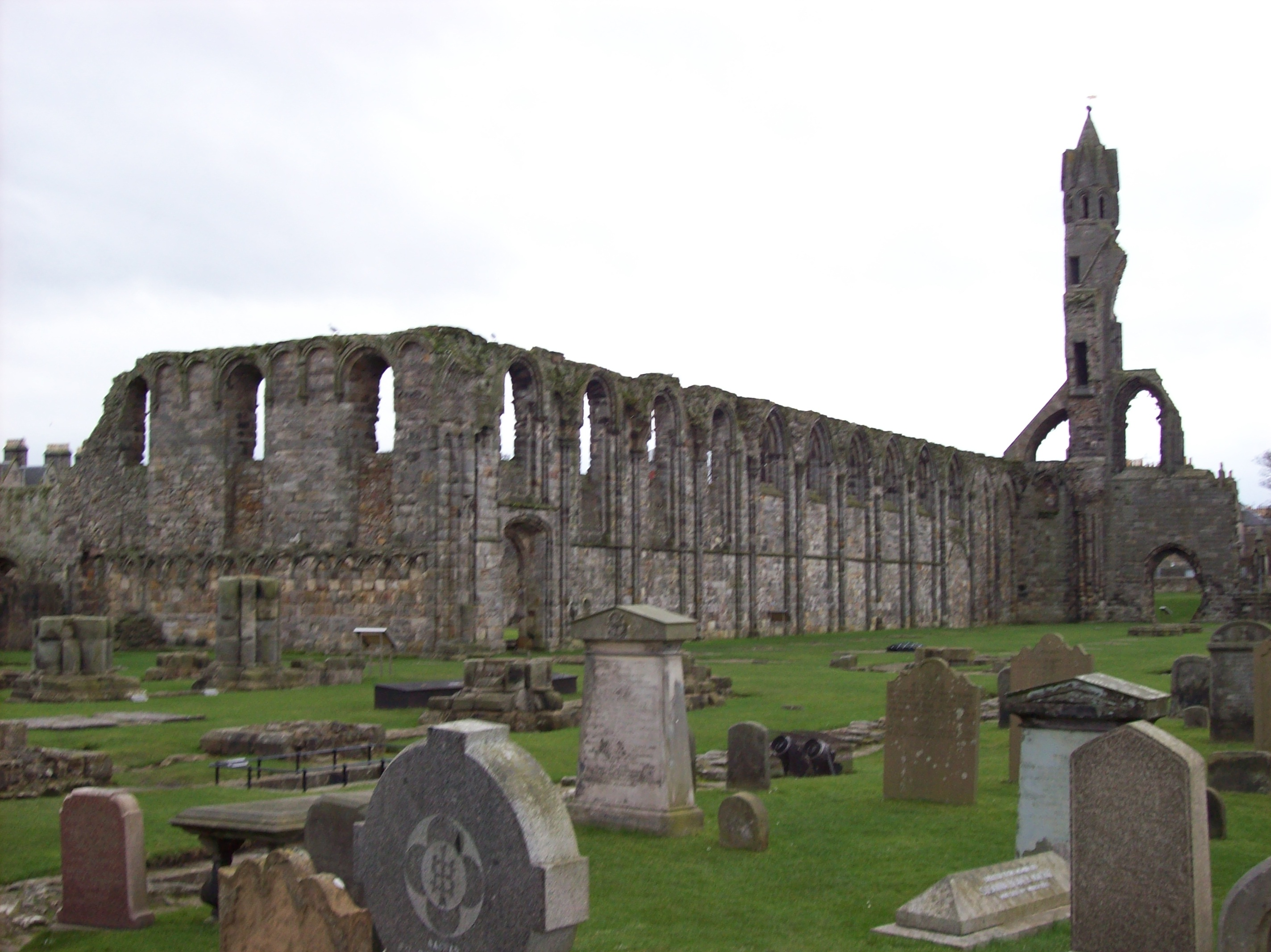
The ruins of the nave and south transept

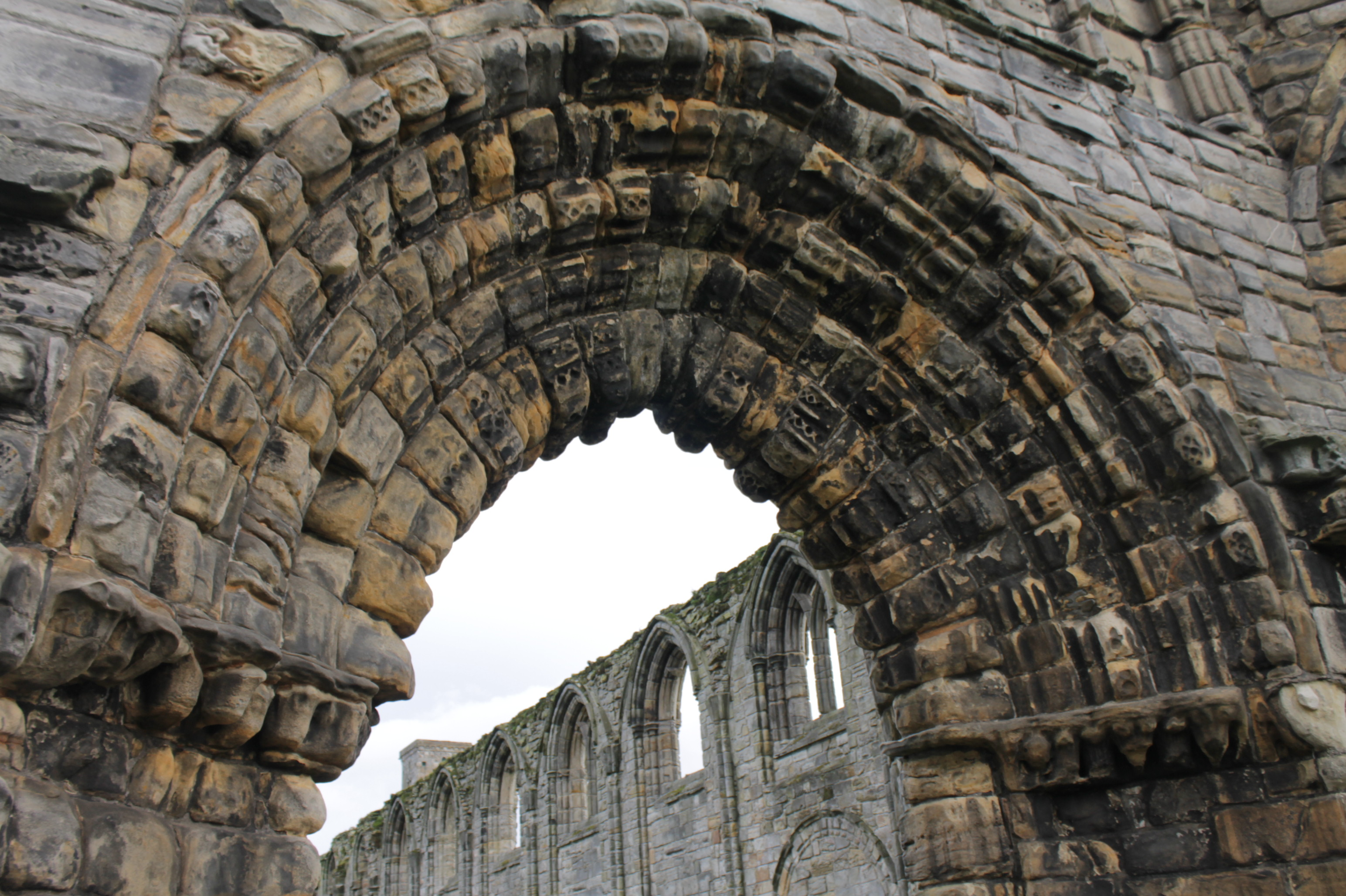
Archway over main west door

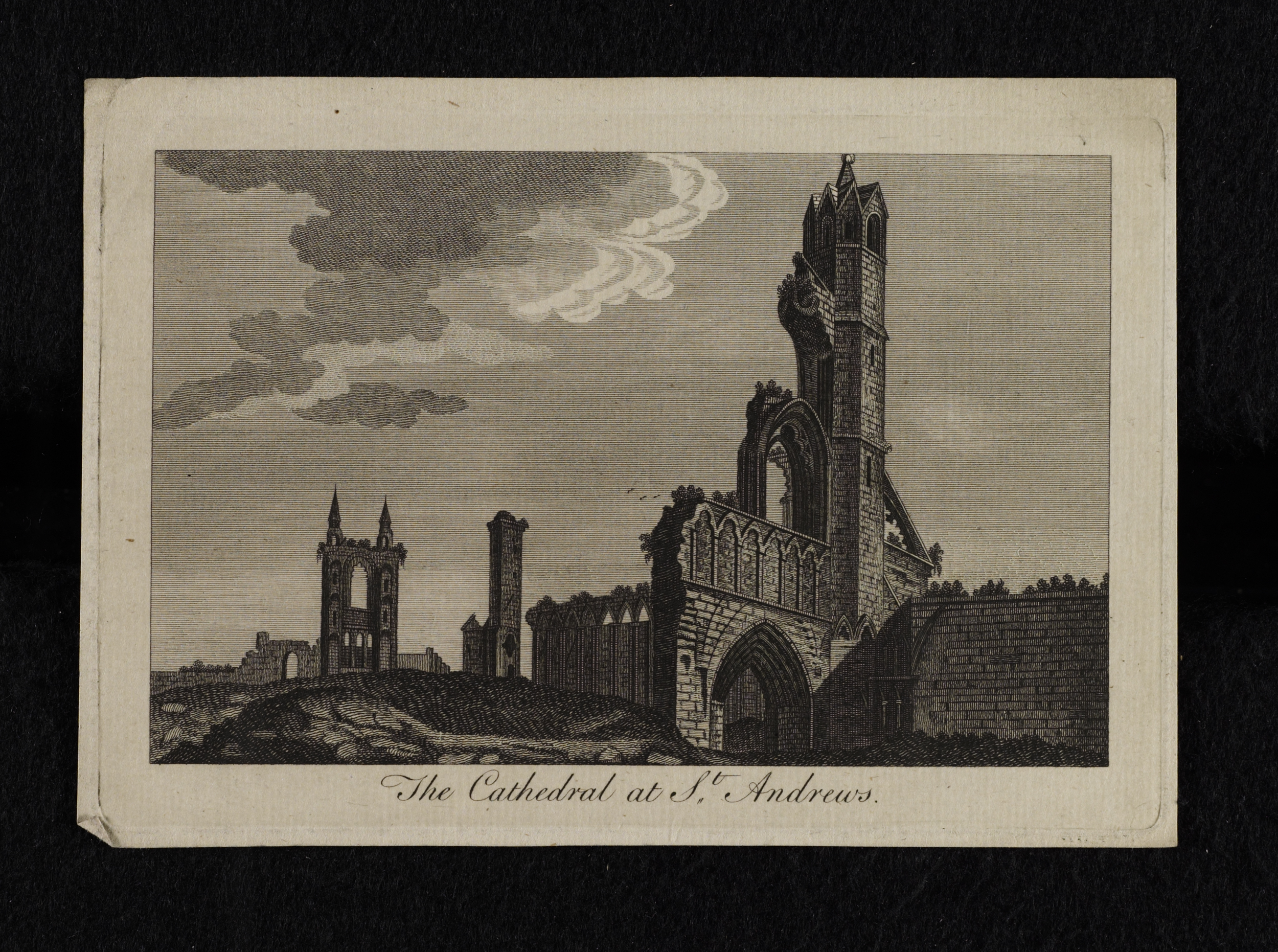
Historic view of St Andrews Cathedral

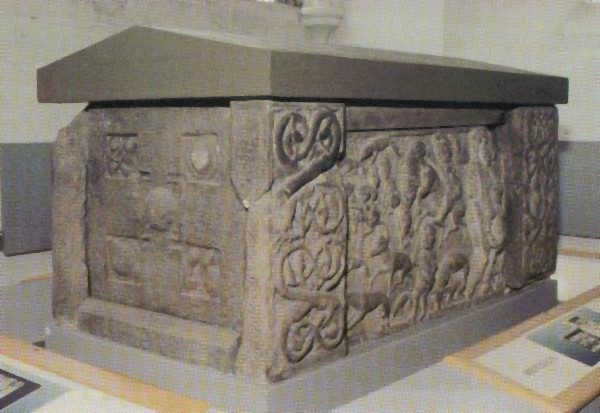
The St Andrews Sarcophagus

In June 1559 during the Reformation, a Protestant mob incited by the preaching of John Knox ransacked the cathedral; the interior of the building was destroyed. The cathedral fell into decline following the attack and became a source of building material for the town. By 1561 it had been abandoned and left to fall into ruin.

At about the end of the sixteenth century the central tower apparently gave way, carrying with it the north wall. Afterwards large portions of the ruins were taken away for building purposes, and nothing was done to preserve them until 1826. Since then it has been tended with scrupulous care, an interesting feature being the cutting out of the ground-plan in the turf. The principal portions extant, partly Norman and partly Gothic, are the east and west gables, the greater part of the south wall of the nave and the west wall of the south transept.

At the end of the seventeenth century some of the priory buildings remained entire and considerable remains of others existed, but nearly all traces have now disappeared except portions of the priory wall and the archways, known as The Pends.

== St Rule's Tower ==
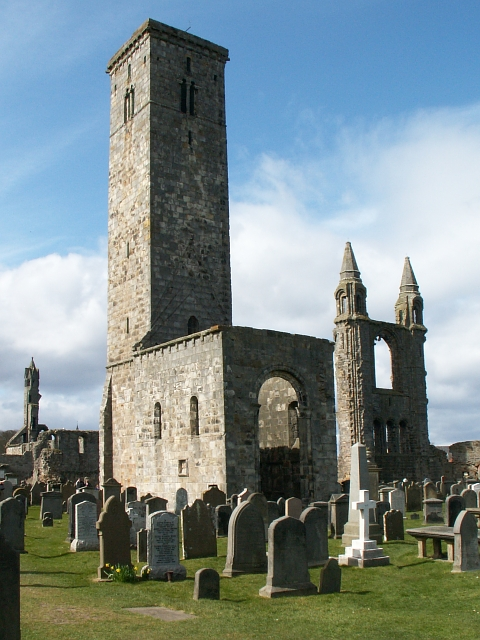
St Rule's tower

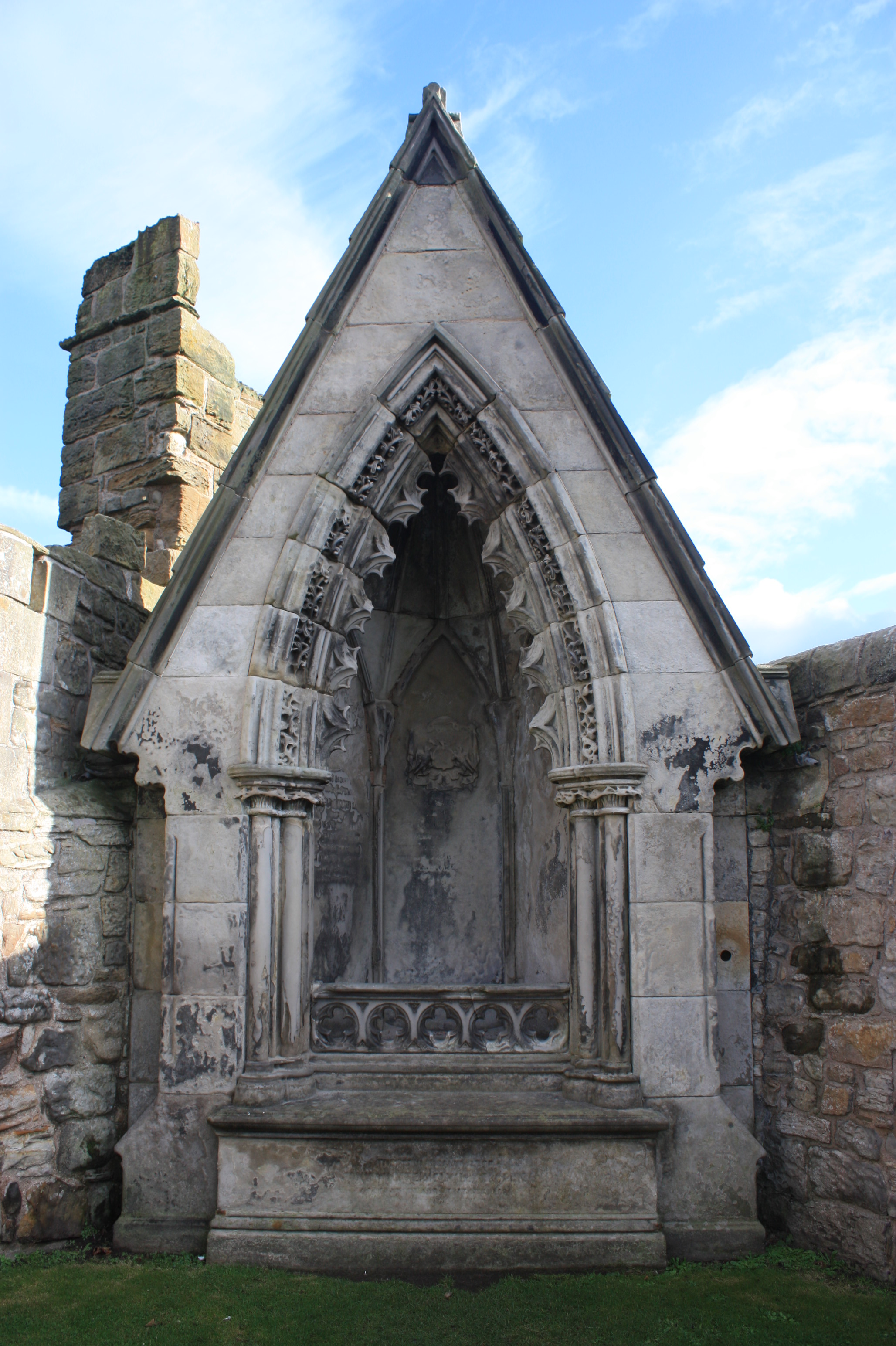
The Whyte-Melville memorial

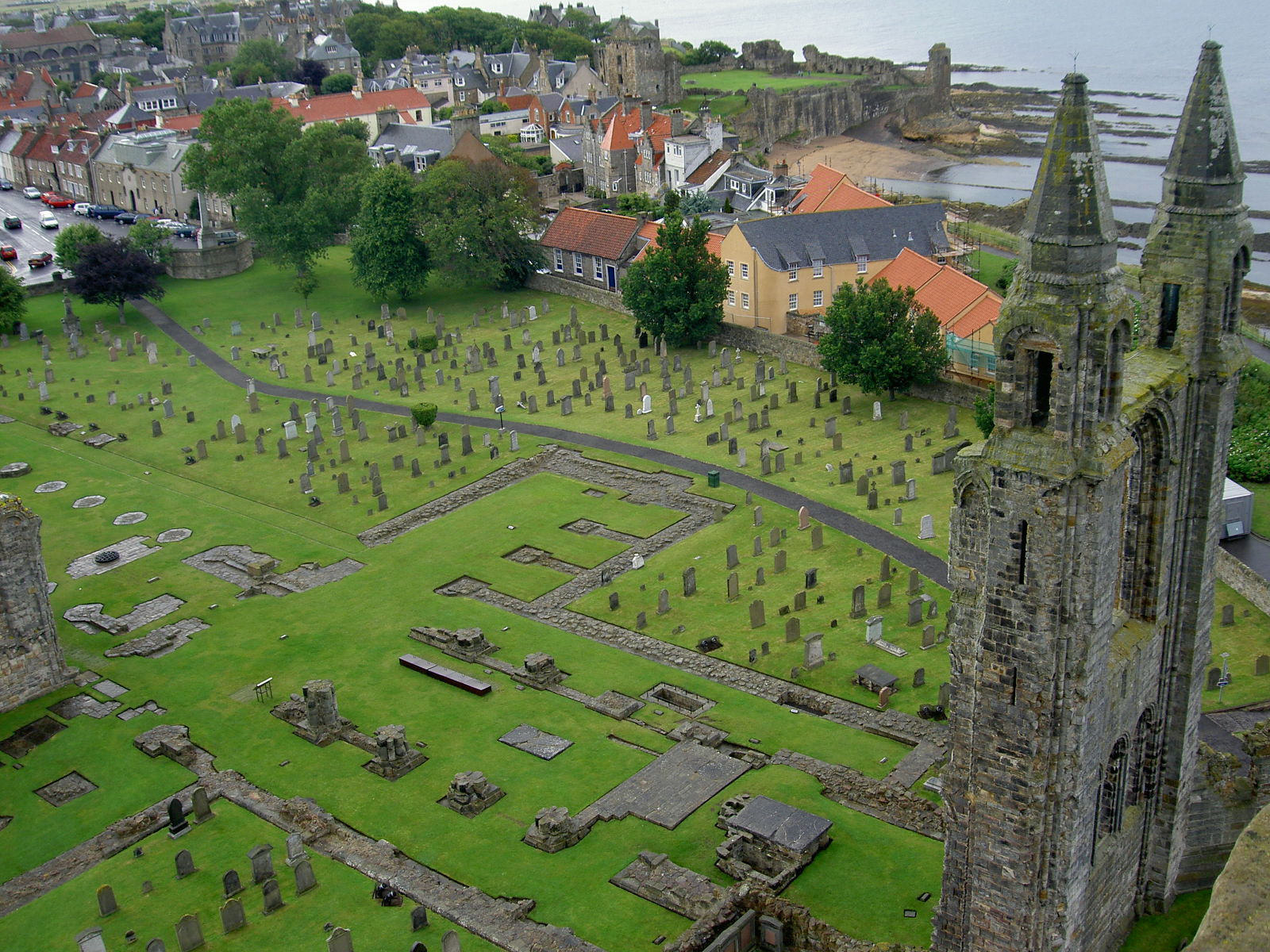
The view from the top of St. Rule's Tower

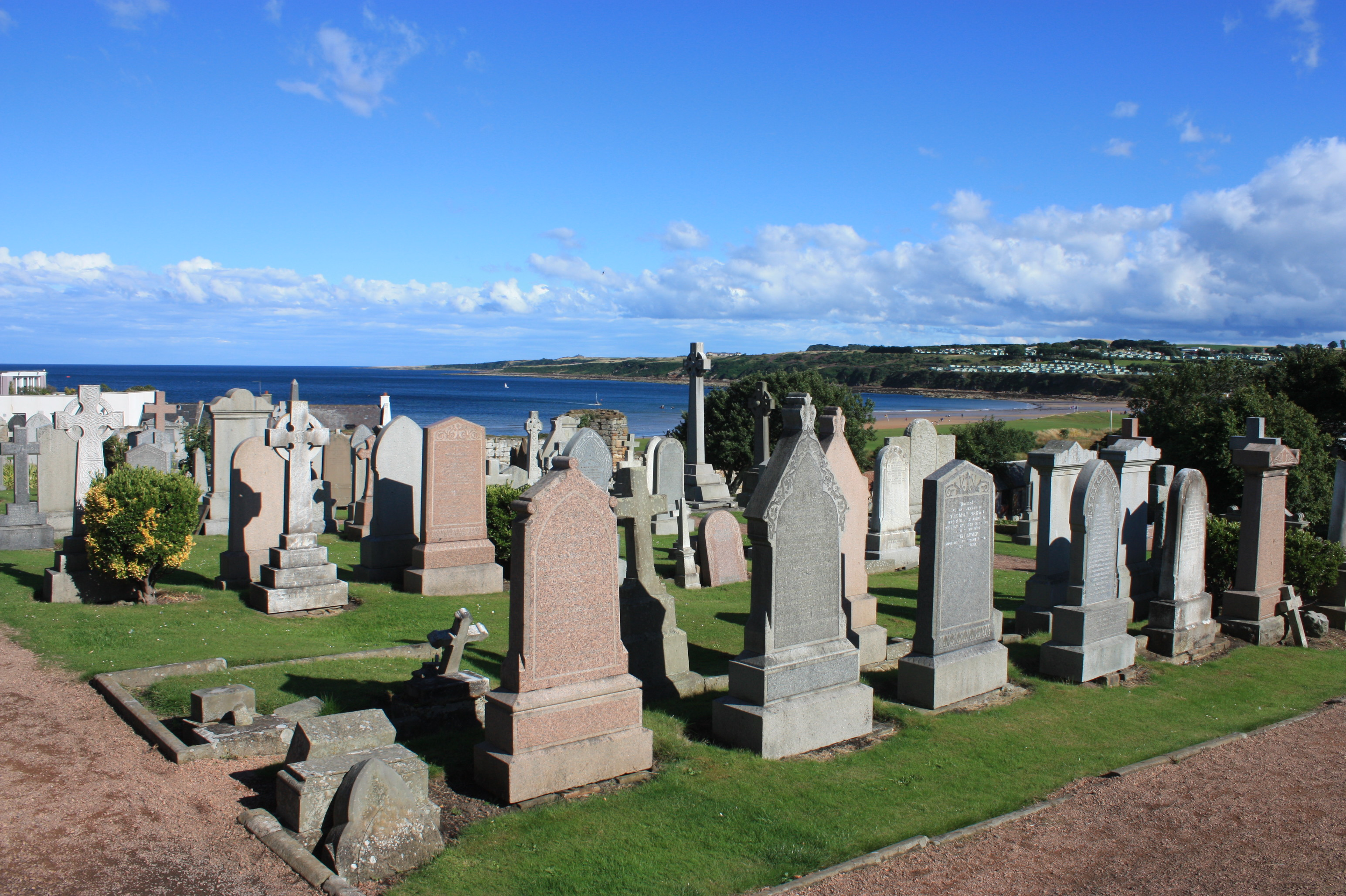
The Eastern Cemetery, looking south to the bay

St Rule's tower is located in the cathedral grounds but antedates it, having served as the church of the priory up to the early 12th century. The building was retained to allow worship to continue uninterrupted during the building of its much larger successor. Originally, the tower and adjoining choir were part of the church built in the 11th century to house the relics of St Andrew. The nave, with twin western turrets, and the apse of the church no longer stand. The church's original appearance is illustrated in stylised form on some of the early seals of the cathedral priory. Legend credits St Rule (also known as St Regulus) with bringing relics of St Andrew to the area from their original location at Patras in Greece. Today the tower commands an admirable view of the town, harbour, sea, and surrounding countryside. Built in grey sandstone ashlar, and (for its date) immensely tall (33 m; 108 ft), it is a land- and sea-mark seen from many miles away, its prominence doubtless meant to guide pilgrims to the place of the Apostle's relics. In the Middle Ages a spire atop the tower made it even more prominent. The tower was originally ascended using ladders between wooden floors, but a stone spiral staircase was inserted in the 18th century.

=== Architecture ===
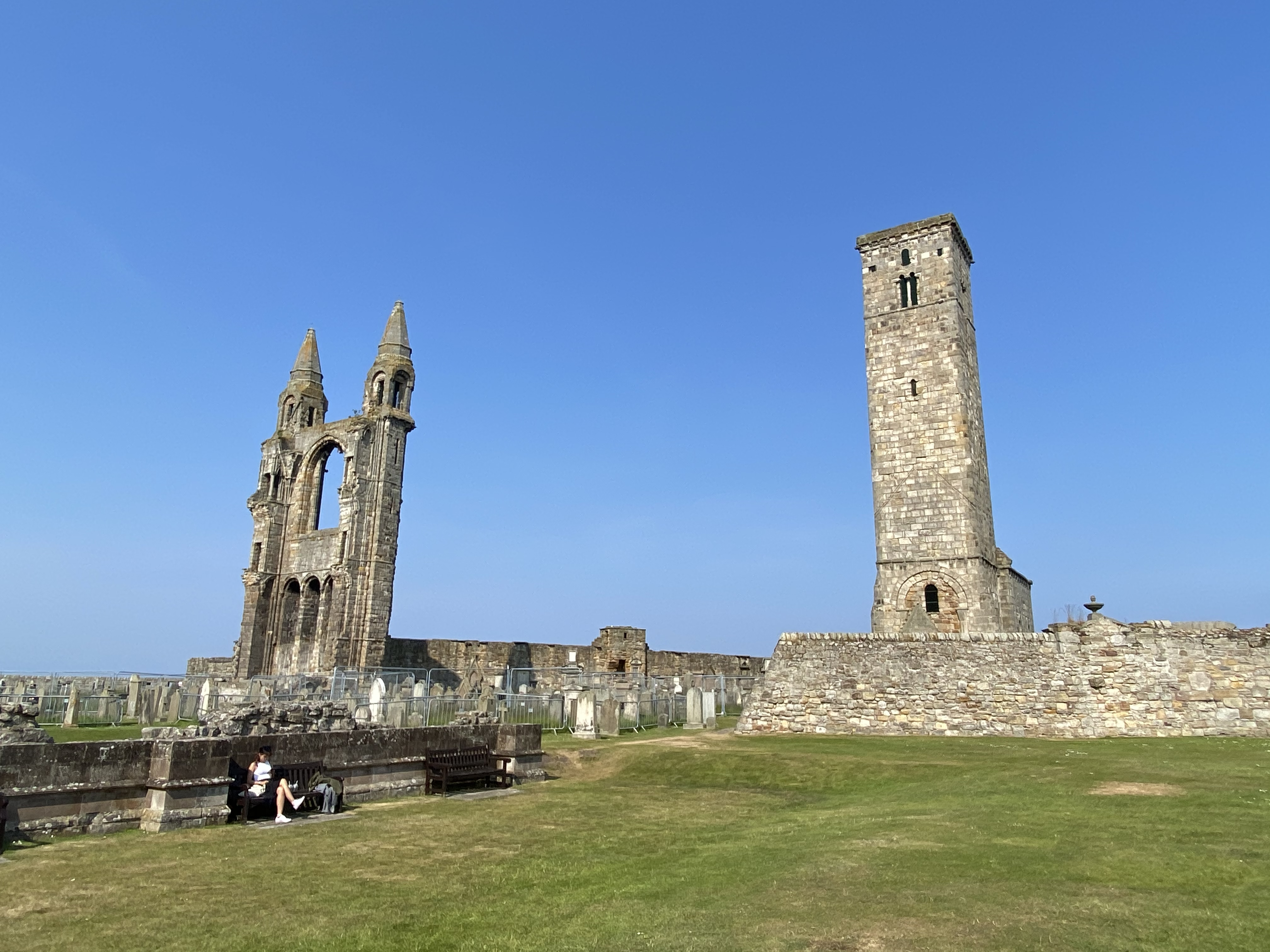
St Rule's Tower and remains of Eastern wall of later Cathedral, as seen from the south-west

The tower and its adjoining eastern chamber are part of a church that once extended further east; a later addition was also built onto the tower's west side. The walls are notably thin for their height and built of finely squared grey ashlar on a chamfered plinth. Corbel tables mark two separate building phases at the wall heads, showing that the tower originally stood exposed before being built up further.

==== Arches ====
Three tall, slightly horseshoe-shaped arches are the tower's most notable feature: one each through the east and west walls of the tower, and one through the east wall of the adjoining chamber. The east tower arch, with nook shafts and bell-shaped capitals, shows no sign of later disturbance and is thought to be original. The west tower arch and the chamber's east arch, by contrast, are both later insertions (their masonry is not coursed in with the surrounding walls) and share a similar moulded, shafted design. The west arch is thought to have been cut to open into an enlarged nave; 18th-century repairs re-faced masonry around the eastern arch, though an earlier drawing of the site helps clarify its original form.

=== In literature ===
St. Rule's tower features in Ethel Foster Heddle's novel A Mystery of St. Rules (1902), and is referenced in John Buchan's novel The Free Fishers (1934).

== Burials ==
=== In the cathedral ===
- Roger de Beaumont (bishop) (d. 1202)
- William Wishart (d. 1279)
- William de Lamberton (1328, on the north side of the high altar)
- William Fraser (bishop of St Andrews) (1297, his heart was buried in the wall of the church by his successor, William de Lamberton)
- William de Landallis (1385, in the church's vestry)
- James Kennedy (bishop) (1465, in a magnificent tomb which he had caused to be built in St Salvator's Chapel, the ruins of which are still visible)
- Andrew Forman (d. 1521)

=== Cathedral burial ground ===
- Very Rev John Adamson DD
- John Anderson, Principal of St Leonards College
- Rev Alexander Anderson (1676–1737) son of above
- Rev Prof George Buist DD
- Robert Chambers
- Rev Prof George Cook DD FRSE
- Rev Prof John Cook DD FRSE
- Rev Prof William Crawford DD father of Thomas Jackson Crawford
- Sir Robert Anstruther Dalyell
- Prof James Donaldson (classical scholar)
- Adam Ferguson
- Andrew Forman
- Rev Prof James Gillespie
- Rev Prof Thomas Gillespie, Professor of Humanity
- Robert Haldane (mathematician)
- Thomas Halyburton
- Matthew Forster Heddle
- George Hill (minister)
- Prof Henry David Hill
- Rev Prof James Hunter
- Prof Thomas Jackson FRSE
- David Miller Kay, military hero, author and missionary
- Prof Peter Redford Scott Lang, mathematician
- Rev Prof John McGill LLD, translator of the Old Testament
- Norman MacLeod (The Wicked Man)
- Young Tom Morris
- Old Tom Morris
- William Henry Murray
- Rev Francis Nicoll DD Principal of St Salvator's College, St Andrews
- Hugh Lyon Playfair
- Rev James Playfair (minister) (memorial only)
- Lt Col Sir Robert Lambert Playfair LLD, soldier and author
- Prof Alexander Roberts
- Allan Robertson
- Rev Professor Daniel Robertson DD (1755–1817)
- Rev Prof Samuel Rutherford
- Saint Andrew (partial remains)
- Very Rev Robert Small (1732–1808) Moderator in 1791
- William Spalding (writer)
- Very Rev Prof Alexander Stewart DD Principal of St Andrews University in 1915, Moderator of the General Assembly of the Church of Scotland in 1911
- Rev Prof John Trotter
- Alexander Watson, Provost of St Andrews
- Major John and Lady Catherine Whyte-Melville (the large monument in the far corner of the churchyard)
- Prof William Wright (orientalist)

=== Eastern Cemetery ===
- Col Robert Hope Moncrieff Aitken, Victoria Cross recipient
- Fr George Angus, first Roman Catholic priest in St. Andrews since the Reformation
- Warington Baden-Powell, founder of the Sea Scouts
- Wilhelmina Barns-Graham
- Prof John Birrell
- Andrew Kennedy Hutchison Boyd
- Sir Napier Burnett
- Sir Guy Colin Campbell
- Reginald Fairlie
- Cicely Hilda Farmer, novelist
- William Lewis Ferdinand Fischer, FRS
- James Ross Gillespie, architect
- Sir James Heriot-Maitland
- Sir John Home
- Andrew Kirkaldy (golfer)
- Vice-Admiral Dashwood Fowler Moir, famed for his actions in the Battle of Jutland and who lost his life protecting the Atlantic Convoy
- Charles Metcalfe Ochterlony, 2nd baronet Ochterlony
- James Bell Pettigrew
- Lyon Playfair, Baron Playfair
- William Smoult Playfair
- Prof Thomas Purdie FRS
- Andrew Maitland Ramsay LLD FRSE
- Prof David George Ritchie
- Prof John Tulloch
- Charles Wordsworth

== See also ==
- St Andrews Cathedral Priory
- St Andrews Sarcophagus
- The Way of St Andrews
