= Charles Reid (Indian Army officer) =

British officer of the East India Company and aide-de-camp to Queen Victoria

General Sir Charles Reid GCB
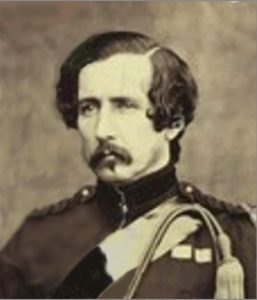
- Reid in 1858
- Born: 19 March 1818; London, England
- Died: 23 August 1901 (aged 83). Southsea, England
- Spouse: Lavinia Lucy Fisher (c.1829–1888) (m. 1846)
- Children: Lavinia Adelaide Reid (1848–1930); Charles Oakeley Reid (1852–1854)

General Sir Charles Reid GCB (19 March 1818 – 23 August 1901) was a British officer of the East India Company and later Indian Army, and aide-de-camp to Queen Victoria.

== Personal life ==
Reid was born in London on 19 March 1818. His father George Reid (c.1778 – 25 January 1827) owned the Bunker's Hill and Friendship sugar plantations in Jamaica and rented Watlington Hall, Norfolk (destroyed by fire in 1940 and rebuilt). His mother Louisa (1786–1879) was the daughter of Sir Charles Oakeley (1751–1826), a former governor of Madras. He had five sisters including Louisa Elizabeth (the eldest daughter), Helena Catherine (born 1814 or 1815), Amelia Maria (1821–1896, the sixth child) and Georgina Ann, and three brothers. Reid was educated at Repton School, and joined the East India Company as a cadet in 1835, aged 16.

In Mussoorie, Bengal, India, on 24 September 1846 Reid married Lavinia Lucy Fisher (Deyrah Dhoon, India 1829 – London 24 August 1888), daughter of Captain John Fisher (d.1890). They had two children, Lavinia Adelaide (Loodiana, India 15 November 1848 – Portsmouth 1930), who married Lieut. Arthur Warry, RA, and Charles Oakeley Reid (India 1852 – India 9 June 1854). Reid's London address was 97 Earl's Court Road, Chelsea.

General Sir Charles Reid died at Southsea, (Note: Jamaica Who's Who gives place of death as "Southsea, Wales", and Southsea, Wrexham, Wales, exists. The Times of London states "Southsea", unqualified, implying the better-known Southsea near Portsmouth, England, but so does the Cardiff Times, which might suggest the place in Wales. A death was recorded of a Charles Reid aged 83 in Jul–Sept 1901 at Portsmouth, which appears to confirm Southsea, England.) on 23 August 1901, aged 83. His will included a legacy of £100 to his sister Amelia Maria, although she had predeceased him by five years. He was buried in Kensington and Chelsea Cemetery.

== Military career ==
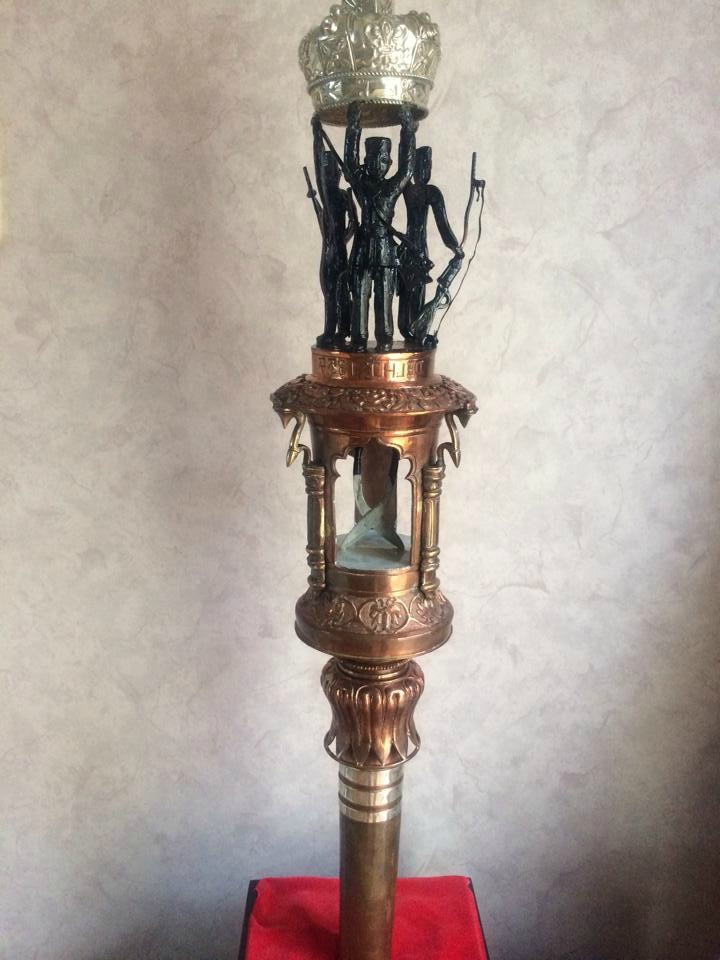
Replica of the Queen's Truncheon, devised by Reid

Reid served in Sindh under Sir Charles Napier in 1843, and led the Sirmoor Battalion at the Siege of Delhi. He was severely wounded on 14 September 1857, and was promoted to lieutenant colonel, receiving the CB in 1858.

Reid later served in Oudh in 1858–1859, and was promoted to colonel and became an aide-de-camp to Queen Victoria. While serving as aide-de-camp, he devised the Queen's Truncheon which the Royal Gurkha Rifles carry as their regimental colour. In 1876, Reid was invited to demonstrate to the Prince of Wales the end loading system which he had introduced, accompanied by a "full battery of Royal Horse Artillery", including guns and limbers, 132 horses, and four chargers, all transported along with the Prince and Reid on the Royal Train from Lahore to Amritsar. (Note: According to the source, the end loading system was not about loading guns with ammunition; it was about loading and unloading the full battery of guns, limbers and horses on and off trains in a speedy and efficient manner)

Reid was promoted to major-general in 1867, lieutenant-general in 1875, and brevetted general in 1877. He was awarded pensions for good service and for his wound.

Reid's decorations included the Sutlej Medal, the India General Service Medal and the Indian Mutiny Medal. He was knighted in 1871 as a Knight Commander of the Order of the Bath (KCB), and was appointed Knight Grand Cross of the order (GCB) in 1886.

== Other activities ==
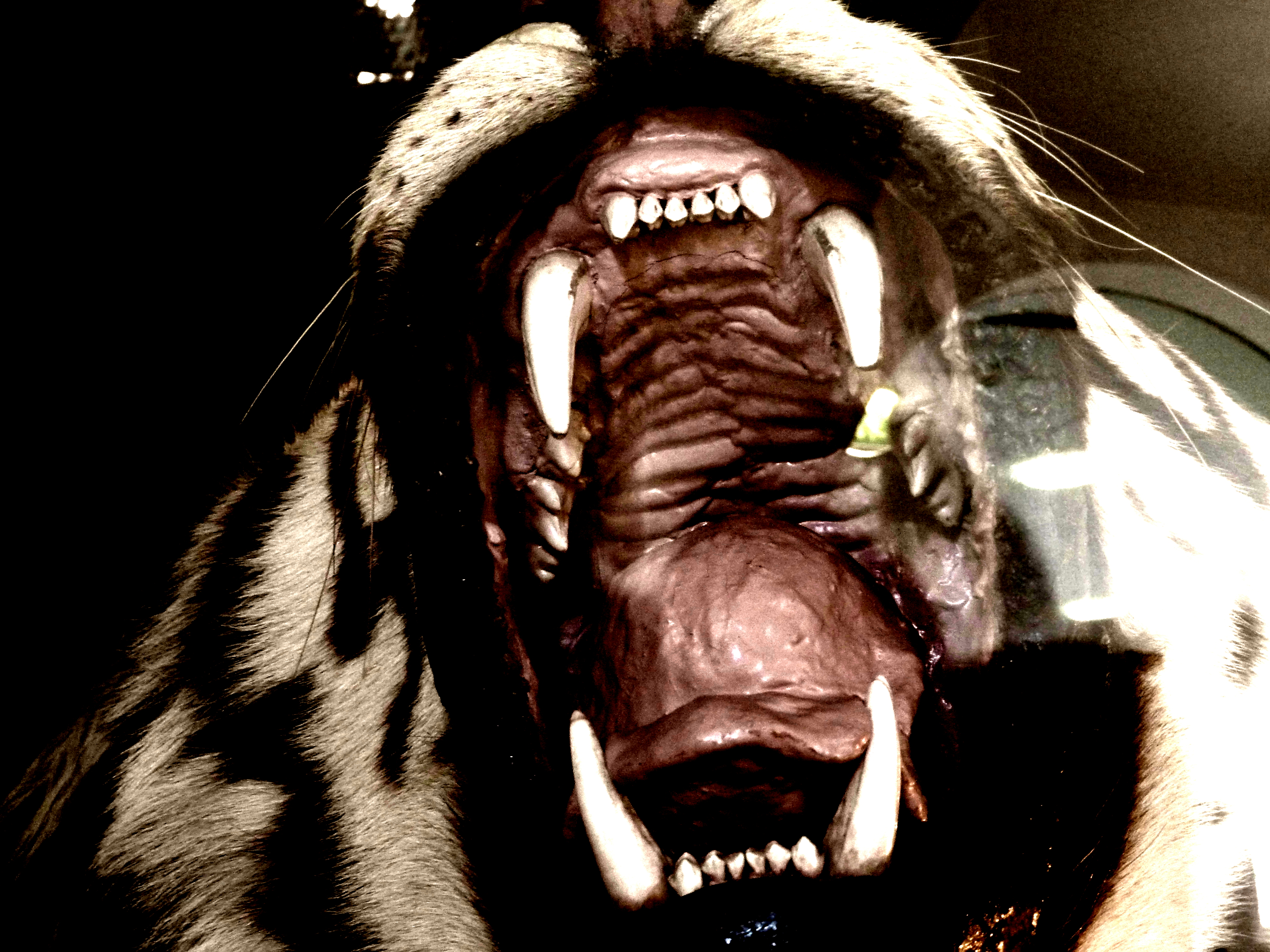
Leeds Tiger snarling

In 1860 Reid shot and killed a large Bengal tiger whose skin was shown at the 1862 International Exhibition. It was subsequently purchased by William Gott, mounted by a taxidermist, and displayed in a series of museums in Leeds, West Yorkshire (Leeds City Museum since 2008), where it is known as the Leeds Tiger. Over the years the displayed taxidermy-mount became subject to a mythology that the original tiger had been a killer of bullocks and even people, but no such evidence has yet been found.

== Selected publications ==
- Reid, General Sir Charles (1858). Extracts from letters and notes written during the siege of Delhi in 1857. London: Henry S. King & Co. Full text available online (Reprinted 2009 by Naval & Military Press, ISBN 978-1845742270)
