= Queen's Truncheon =

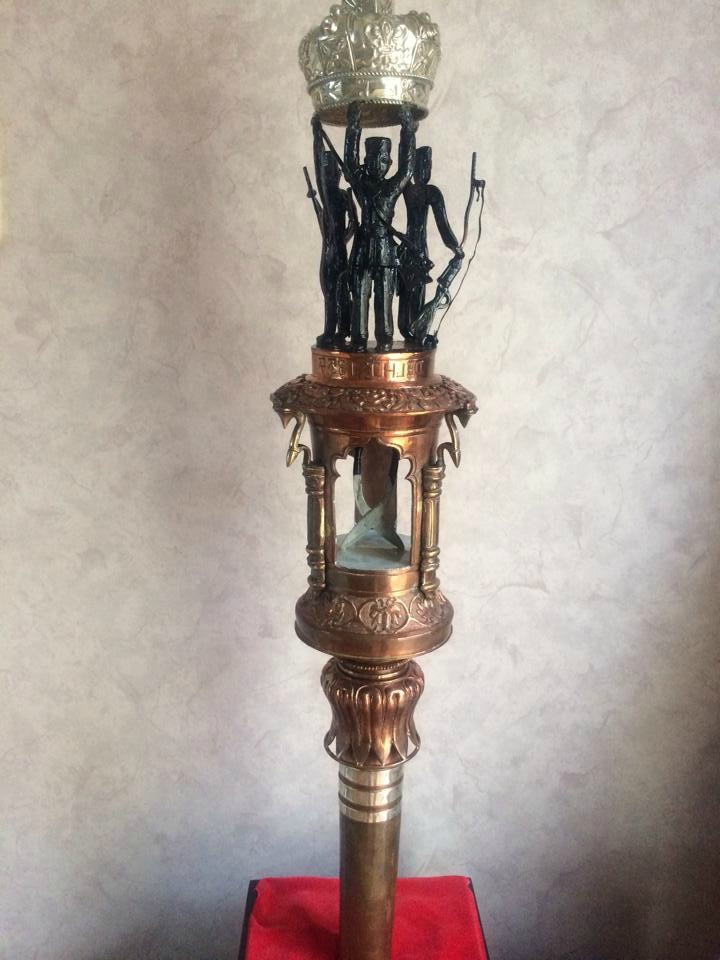
Replica of The Queen's Truncheon

The Queen's Truncheon or 'Nishani Mai', meaning "the mother symbol" or "symbol of the great mother" is a ceremonial staff carried by the Royal Gurkha Rifles that serves as the equivalent of and is carried as the Colour. It is made of bronze and silver. The top represents the minaret of Delhi Palace with three Gurkhas standing on it supporting the Queen's crown above their heads. The minaret contains a pair of crossed kukris and carries the inscription "Main Picqet Hindoo Rao's House, Delhi 1857". The Truncheon is a unique emblem upon which recruits swear allegiance to the Regiment and the Crown.

During the Indian Rebellion of 1857, the 8th (Sirmoor) Local Battalion made a particularly notable contribution. During the four-month Siege of Delhi, they defended Hindu Rao's house, losing 327 out of 490 men. During this action they fought side-by-side with the 60th Rifles and a strong bond developed.

After the rebellion the 60th Rifles pressed for the Sirmoor Battalion to become a rifle regiment. This honour was granted then next year (1858) when the battalion was renamed the Sirmoor Rifle Regiment and awarded a third colour. In 1863 Queen Victoria presented the regiment with the Queen's Truncheon, devised by Charles Reid, as a replacement for the colours that rifle regiments do not usually have.

The Sirmoor Rifle Regiment eventually became the 2nd King Edward VII's Own Gurkha Rifles (The Sirmoor Rifles), retaining possession of the Truncheon until 1994, when it was amalgamated with the other three British Gurkha regiments as The Royal Gurkha Rifles. The new regiment took possession of the Truncheon on permanent loan from the 2nd Gurkhas, and maintains the tradition of using it in place of colours.

== See also ==
- Truncheon
- Battle honour
