= William Gott (industrialist) =

English philanthropist (1797–1863)

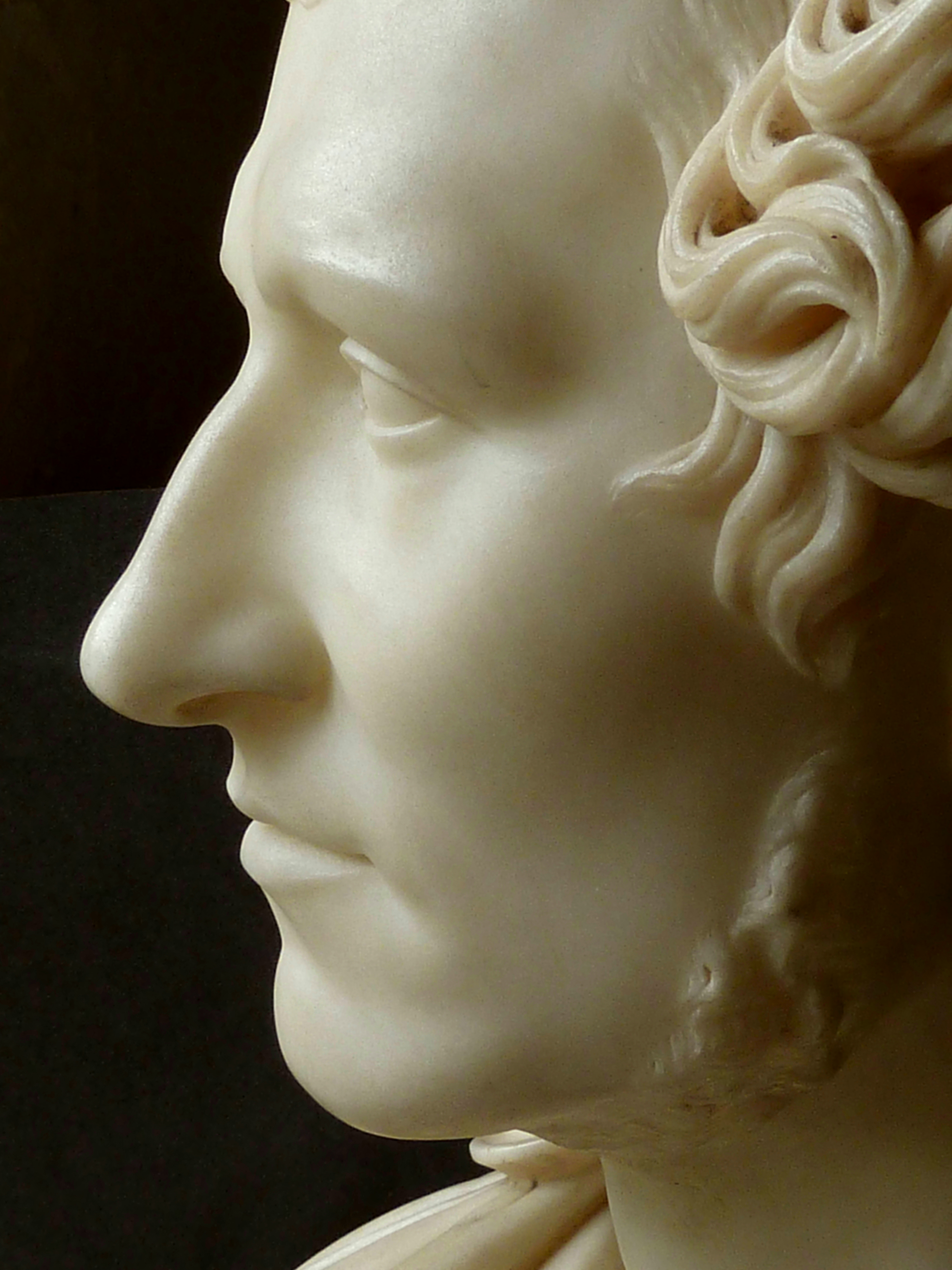
- Bust of William Gott by Joseph Gott, 1834
- Born: 1797; Leeds, West Riding of Yorkshire, England
- Died: 26 August 1863 (aged 65–66); Patterdale, Northumberland
- Occupations: Wool merchant, mill-owner
- Known for: Philanthropy towards public services, collecting fine art and rare books, supporting building of Leeds General Infirmary (1863), paying low wages which caused a weaver's strike
- Father: Benjamin Gott

William Gott (1797 – 26 August 1863) was a British wool merchant, mill owner, philanthropist towards public services and art collector from Leeds, West Riding of Yorkshire, England.

Together with his brother John, William Gott took over management of Armley Mills, the former Park Mills at Bean Ings, Leeds, and other businesses from their father Benjamin Gott from the mid-1820s. Their company, Gott & Sons, was a major local employer, having hundreds of regular workers, plus weavers on piece-work. While involved with the company they faced an indictment for smoke pollution at Park Mills, and showed an unsympathetic response in line with 19th-century culture to a weavers' pay strike due to low wages.

William Gott lived in various mansions, including Denison Hall and Wyther Hall at Leeds, and Bay Fort at Torquay, Devon. He married twice and had at least six children, one of whom was John Gott, Bishop of Truro. His philanthropy included the contribution of funds towards churches and civic buildings, and the provision of exhibits including the Leeds Tiger for Leeds Museum, via the Leeds Philosophical Society of which he was vice president by the end of his life. His art collections are now dispersed, but his bound volumes of watercolours, lithographs and drawings are held at the Hepworth Gallery at Wakefield, West Yorkshire, and his Piranesi drawings are in the British Museum.

== Life ==
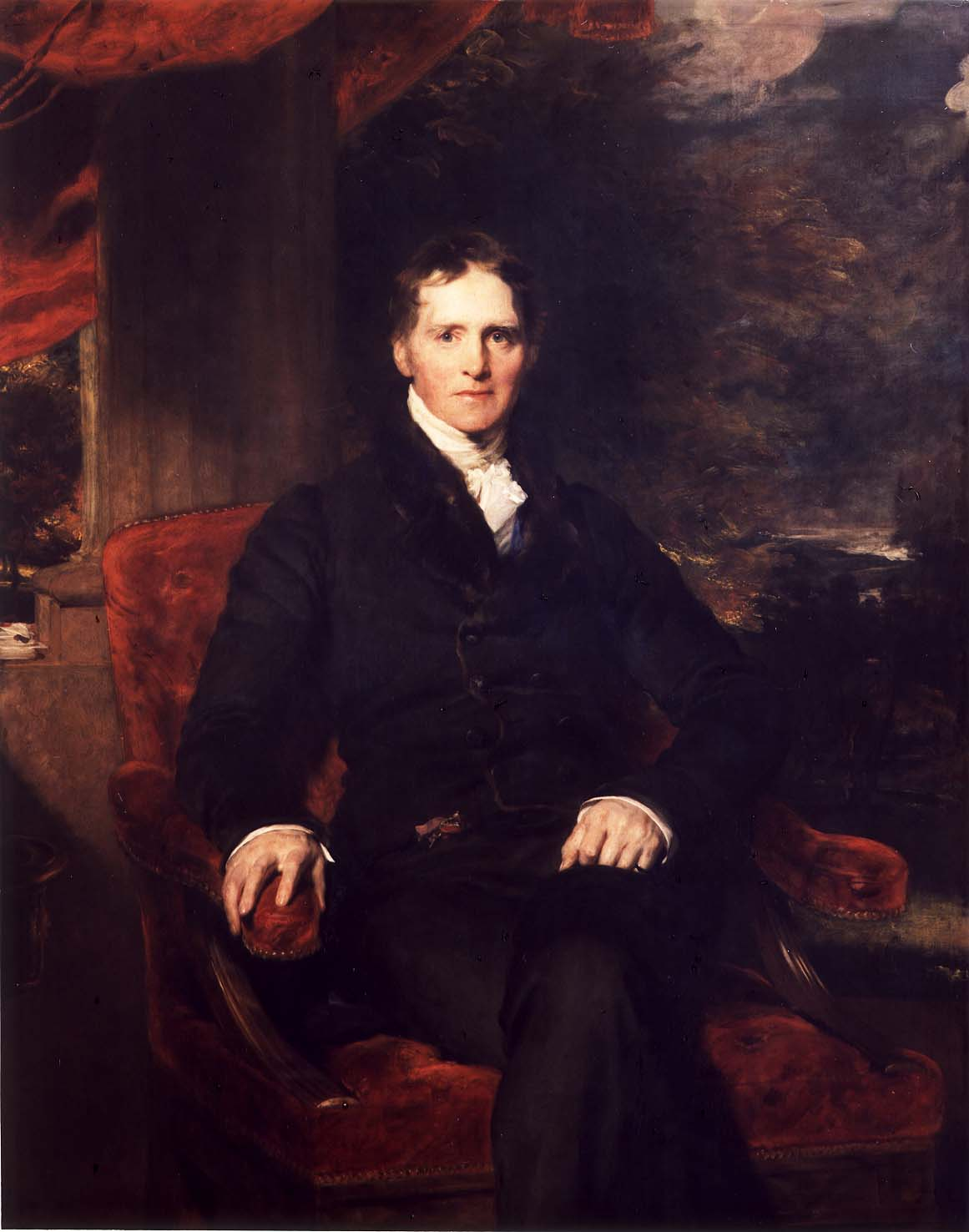
William Gott's father Benjamin Gott

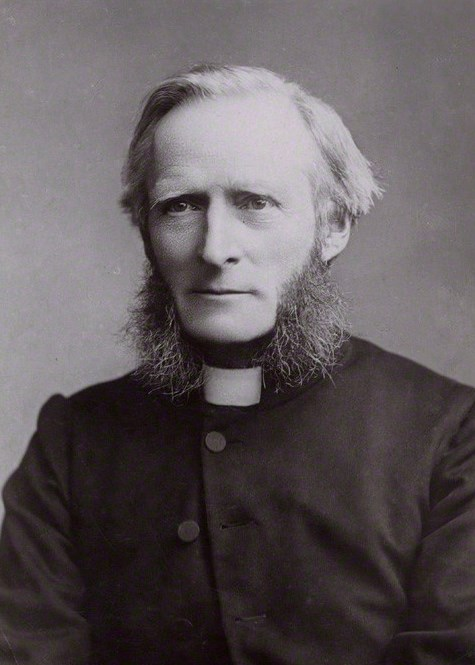
Bishop John Gott, son of William Gott

William Gott's paternal grandparents were engineer and bridge-surveyor John Gott (1720–1793) of Woodhall, Bradford and Susanna Jackson of Bradford. His parents were Benjamin Gott (1762–1840) of Armley House, Leeds, and Elizabeth Rhodes (1768–1857) of Badsworth. William was their third son, born in Leeds, and baptised on 15 March 1797 at St Peter, Leeds. William had three brothers, John (1791–1867), Benjamin (1793 – Athens 1817) and Henry (d.Paris 1825), and an unmarried sister Harriet (1795 – Hyde Park 30 April 1883). William Gott attended a Leeds drawing academy run by Joseph Rhodes (1778–1855). (Note: Art UK gives Joseph Rhodes' dates as 1782–1854.)

=== First marriage ===
On Wednesday 15 August 1821 at Childwall parish church, Gott married Margaret Ewart (1795–1844), or (d. Woodhouse 9 August 1846), daughter of Liverpool merchant William Ewart (1763–1823) of Mossley Hill, Lancashire. Margaret Ewart's brothers were William Ewart, MP for Dumfries Burghs (1798–1869), and Joseph Ewart, MP for Liverpool. William and Margaret had at least six children all born in Leeds, including Margaret (b.ca.1823), William Ewart Gott (1827–1879), Elizabeth (b.ca.1826), Anne (b.ca.1828), John Gott (Leeds 25 December 1830 – Trenython 21 July 1906) who was vicar of Leeds, Dean of Worcester, and Bishop of Truro, and Harriet Caroline Robins née Gott (ca.1841 – Tonbridge 1906).

=== Second marriage ===
Gott's second wife was the widow Susannah Maria McLauchlan Raoux née Backler (Paris 21 January 1822 – Lewisham 8 March 1901), whom he married on 28 July 1851 in Kennington, Surrey, and again on 6 April 1853 in Blatherwycke, Northamptonshire. He was 25 years her senior, and they had no children. Susannah's father was cupper John Backler (d. Whitechapel 1846). Her first marriage, in 1841 in Paris, was to Charles Raoux (d. by 1851). On 2 November 1875 at Westminster St James, after Gott's death, she married her third husband Archdeacon Anthony Huxtable (1808 – St Leonards-on-Sea 12 December 1883), he having been widowed when his already-paralysed wife Maria Sarah Huxtable (1796 – Newton Abbot 1874) died when a lift-rope broke at home.

=== Other life events ===
In June 1829 William Gott's governess Miss Daniel innocently married one "John" Stanley, a wool merchant, broker, father to eleven children and uncertificated bankrupt from London who had been living in Leeds for a few years. Stanley was a bigamist called Joseph Stanley, and all was revealed when his first wife arrived from London in 1830, after he had been pretending to the mother of his children for some years that he was in debt and had driven her to destitution by taking all her property. Stanley had spent the money on furnishing Crimbles House, Leeds for the second Mrs Stanley. William Gott, Benjamin Gott and Miss Daniel's father attempted to deal with the matter, the first Mrs Stanley pressed charges and Joseph Stanley ran away.

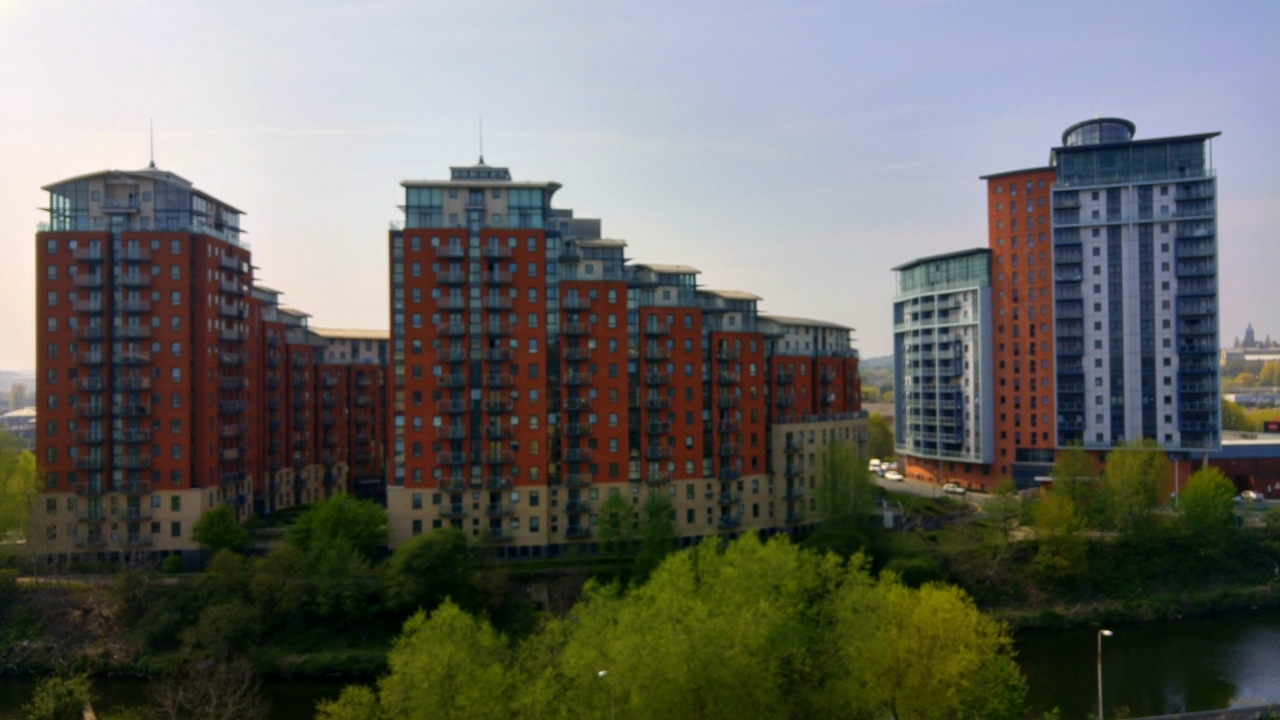
Gotts Road still exists, but not as William Gott knew it

In 1832 a 20-foot-wide road on one of Gott & Sons' properties in Burley, Leeds was enclosed by the enclosure commissioner George Hayward, for the purposes of road improvement. It was to be named Gott's Road. It led west from the Burley Green Road.

=== Politics, religion and personality ===
The Leeds Intelligencer said:

In politics, Mr. Gott was a sound Conservative, though he took no public part in them. He was very tolerant of the political opinions of others, and in all his dealings with other men he displayed an almost complete abnegation of political partisanship. In religion, Mr. Gott was a consistent member of the Church of England, whose usefulness he sought to extend, not less by his own life of practical piety, than by the way in which he aided every scheme for church improvement in the town. The Dean of Chichester would bear us witness [that] ... in all his many works Mr. Gott was at his right hand ... Kindness to others, sympathy with all sorrow, and a desire to make all around him happy, were the prominent points of his character.

Rev. F.J. Wood said:

[Gott was] upright and just in every relation of life, gentle and considerate towards all who were brought into contact with him, generous and munificent in his charities, the sympathising friend of the poor, the warm and constant supporter of every good work both at home and abroad, a true gentleman in the highest sense of the word, a sincere and humble Christian ... the name of William Gott has long been a household word in the mouths of many of us.

Although some of his contemporaries said that Gott did not take part in public life, he was nevertheless a councillor for Leeds Corporation, having taken over his brother Johns's councillorship when John was elevated to alderman in 1833.

=== Gott's residences ===
Between at least 1830 and 1851, Gott was living in Denison Hall at 19 Hanover Square, Leeds. This large 18th-century mansion designed for wool merchant William Denison (1714–1782) of Kirkgate, Leeds, by William Lindley of Doncaster, is now a Grade II* listed building. During his last years, his residences were Wyther Grange also known as Wyther Hall, Kirkstall, Leeds, and Bay Fort, Torquay.

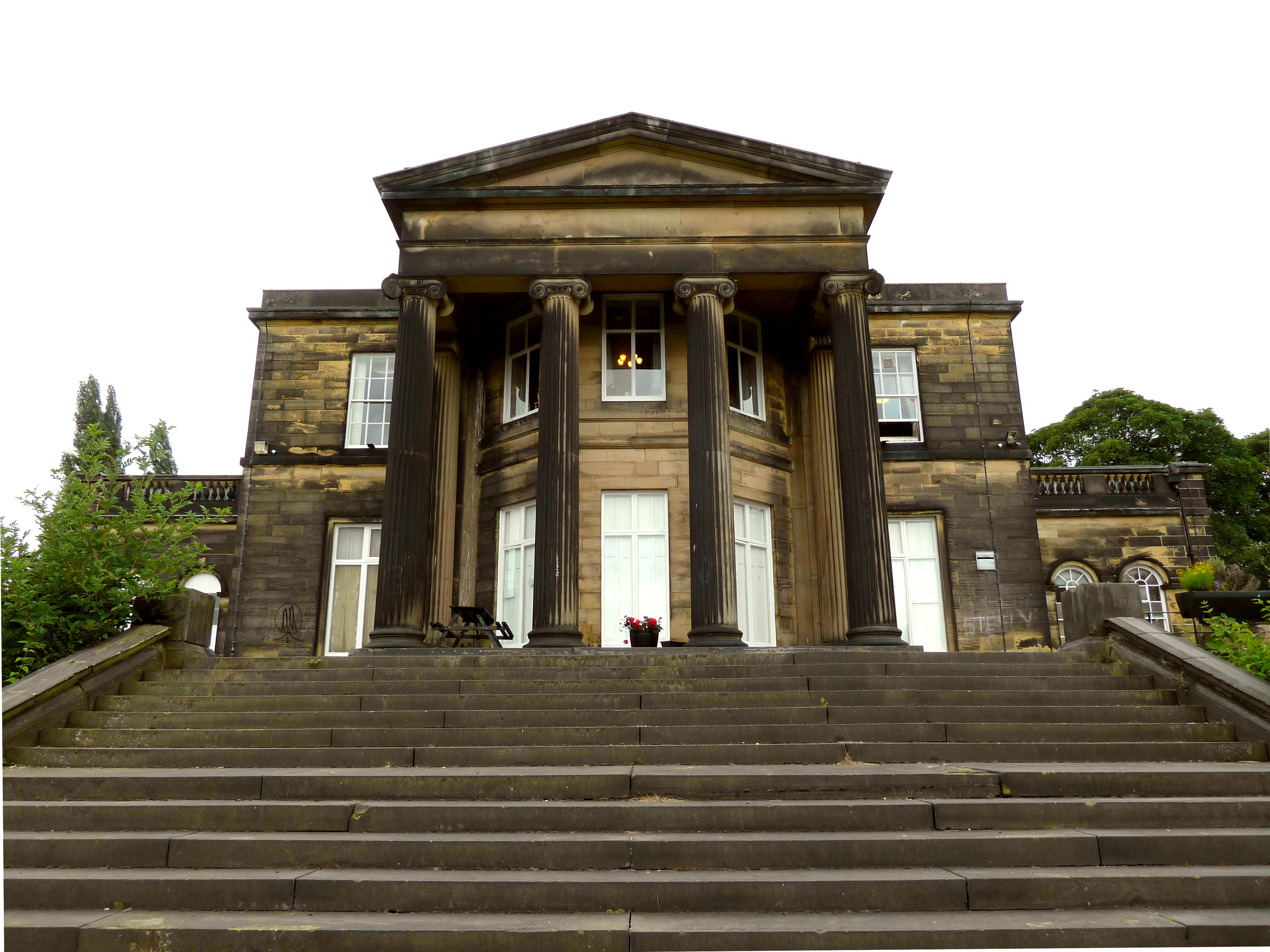
Armley House, Armley, where Gott spent his childhood

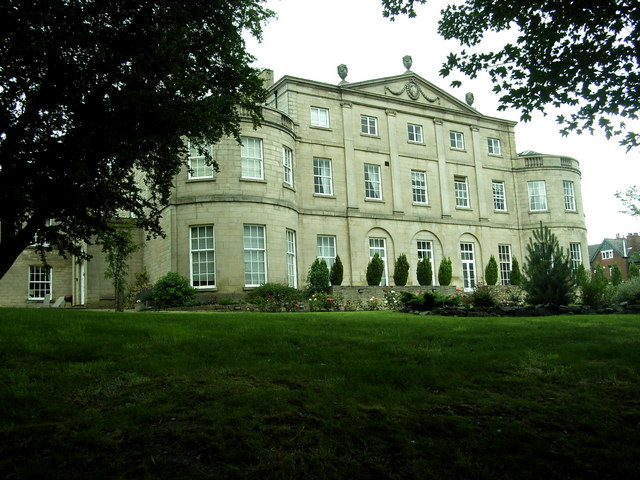
Denison Hall, Leeds (now apartments)

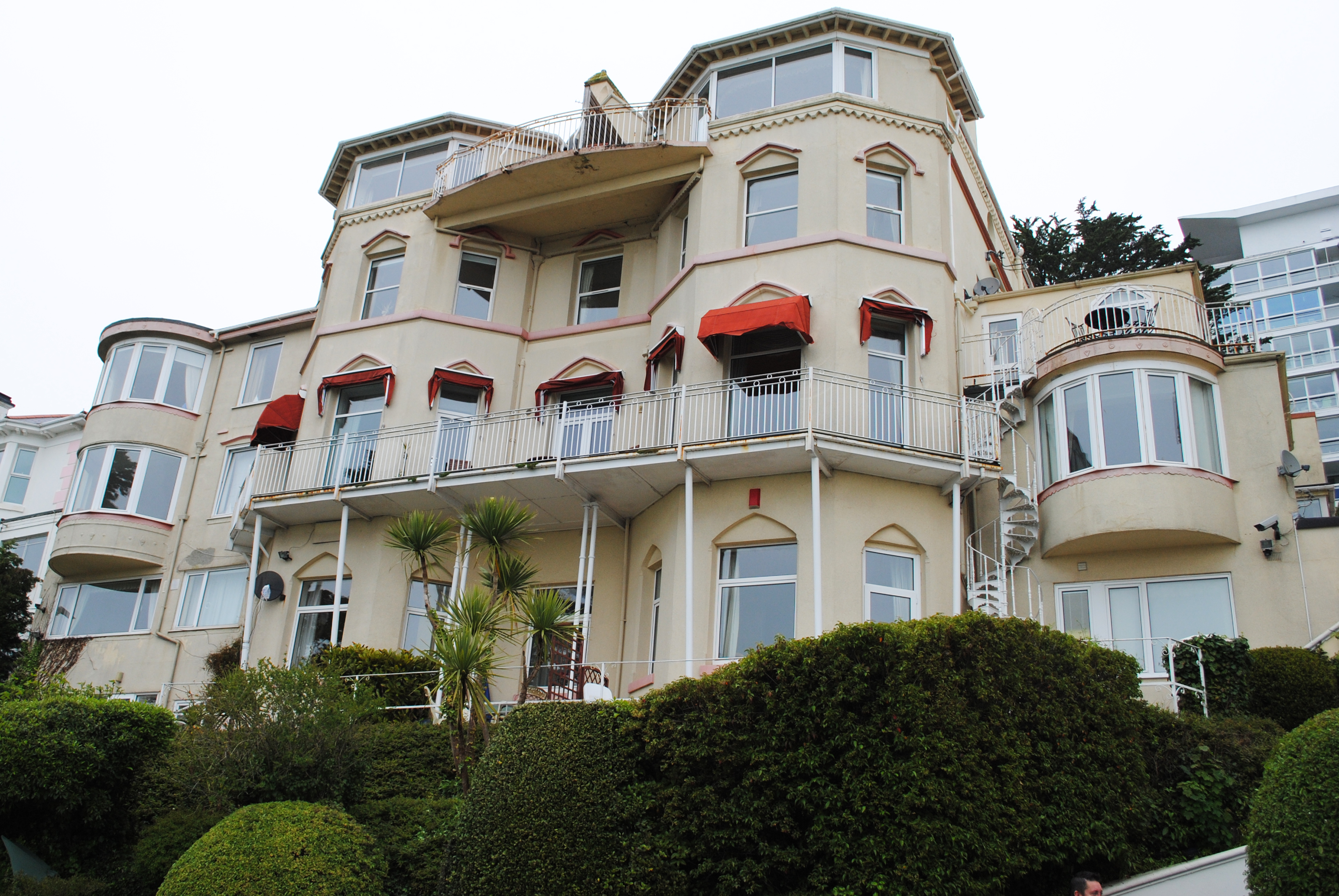
Bay Fort, Torquay (now apartments)

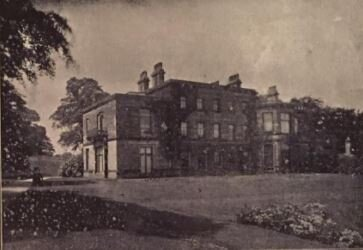
Wyther Hall, Leeds (demolished 1990s)

=== Death and funeral ===
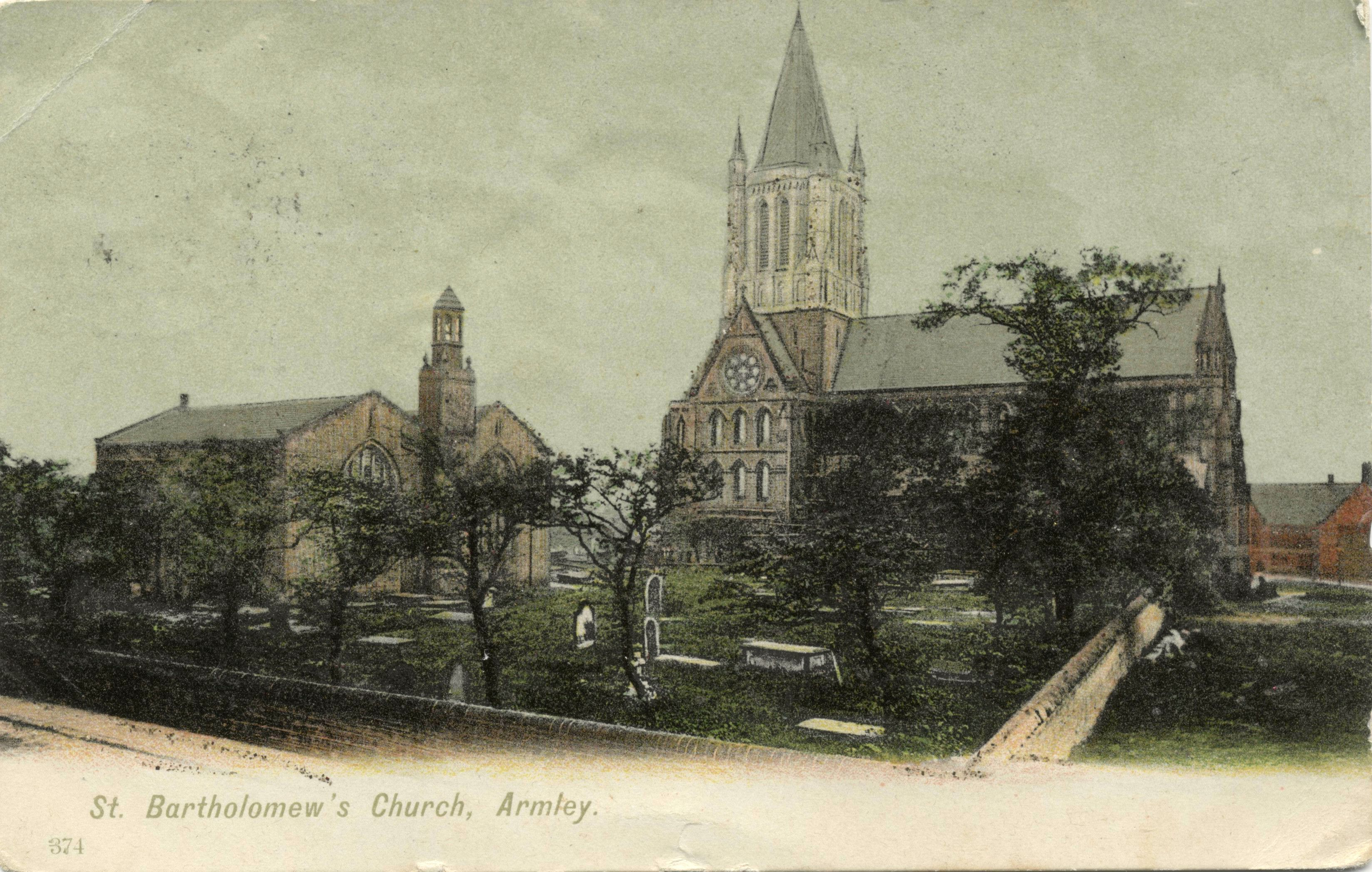
The former St Bartholomew's Church, Armley (left) where Gott was interred

Gott "had not enjoyed the best of health for some years past", when he died suddenly on 25 August 1863 at Patterdale, Northumberland, while visiting. He was not ill when he arrived but, according to the London Evening Standard, on 20 August "he got wet during a short walk", "and a serious attack of dysentery came on, from which he never rallied". According to the Leeds Intelligencer, he caught a cold, suffered from diarrhoea, and "rapidly sunk".

On 1 September 1863, William Gott's funeral took place inside the former St Bartholomew's chapel, which stood near the present site of St Bartholomew's Church, Armley, (Note: The former St Bartholomew's chapel was demolished in 1909. The present St Bartholomew's Church was consecrated in 1877.). and he was interred in the large family vault in the chancel, below the Benjamin Gott monument. (Note: The original St Bartholomew's Church, Armley, was demolished in 1909. There is a memorial sculpture by Joseph Gott, dedicated to William Gott, inside the replacement St Bartholomew's Church) The cortège included a hearse, four coaches and a "large number of carriages", and it processed for an hour between Wyther Hall and Armley Church, while the Town Hall bell tolled. "Many of the principal tradesmen in the town closed their shops until the funeral had terminated". The Burial Office was said by Canon Atley, Rev. G. Armfield and Rev. S. Joy. The John Bull said:

The church was crowded ... most of the ladies of the family were present. The great bell at the Town Hall was muffled and tolled during the time the funeral was taking place. Also a muffled peal, composed expressly for the occasion by Mr. Gawkrodger, (Note: William Gawkrodger (c.1806– Leeds 1874) was a Leeds bellringer from 1819. In 1841 he designed the ring of 13 bells for Leeds Parish Church (now Leeds Minster). See Church Bells Vol.4, 18 April 1874, p.235) was rung during the day on the parish church bells, and at St Philip's, (Note: St Philip's was possibly St Philip's Church, Hunslet, which no longer exists) and Trinity Churches similar tokens of respect were paid; and a great number of shops were closed.

Gott's will was proved on 21 October 1863 at Wakefield. He left effects under £140,000 (equivalent to £15,208,406 in 2025).

== Career ==
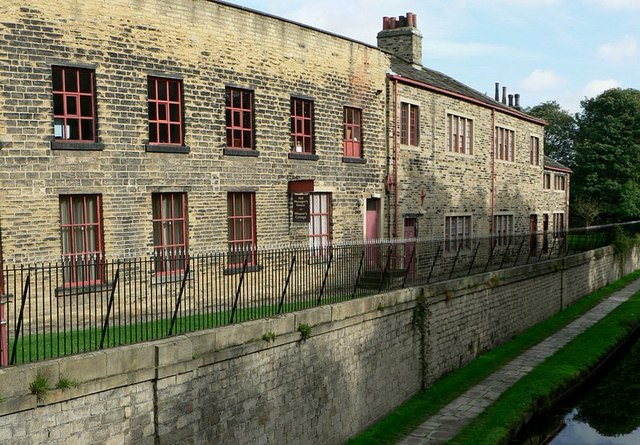
Armley Mills, now Leeds Industrial Museum

Together with his brother John Gott, William Gott was a senior partner in the woollen cloth mercantile and manufacturing firm Benjamin Gott & Sons at Armley Mills and Park Mills at Bean Ings, Leeds, having taken over from his father Benjamin Gott, in 1825. (Note: Benjamin Gott had relinquished Burley Mills by 1822 before his sons became partners, so John and William Gott were not involved in the management of that site. See Historic England: Burley Mills main range 1375051.) By 1861 the brothers were employing a total of 291 men, 361 women, 63 boys and 102 girls.

The University of Leeds has a cloth-pattern book, dated 1815 (when Gott was aged 18), which once belonged to a William Gott.

=== Smoke nuisance trial, 1824 ===
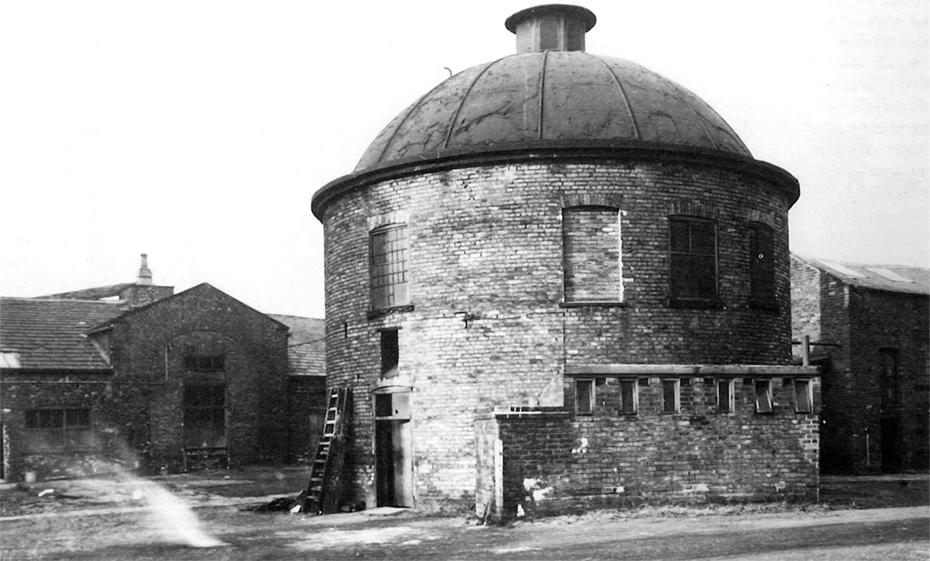
Park Mills at Bean Ings, Leeds

In 1824, Benjamin Gott and his sons John and William were charged with nuisance relating to Park Mills at Bean Ings, which was on the north bank of the River Aire, less than a mile south-west of Park Square, Leeds. The Bean Ings mill was "perhaps the first industrial-scale steam-driven wool mill in the world". (Note: Park Mills at Bean Ings was demolished, but the site was dug by West Yorkshire Archaeology Service 2017–2019.) The legal case was of great interest to industrialists and engineers, on account of the conflict between potential benefits and dangers of industrial progress. The charge was as follows:

The indictment charged that they, on the 13th March 1823, in the borough of Leeds, with force and arms, near the dwelling-houses of divers of His Majesty's liege subjects, did construct and set up a certain engine, worked by steam, and divers furnaces and stoves employed in the working of the said engine, and did improperly and negligently burn large quantities of coke, coal, charcoal and other materials, whereby divers noisome and unwholesome smokes and vapours were emitted, so that the air at Leeds was impregnated with the said smokes and vapours, and was rendered and became greatly corrupted, offensive, uncomfortable and unwholesome. The defendants pleaded – Not Guilty.

In the opening speeches, it was said that previous cases had been difficult to prosecute, because industrialists lived far away from their own factory smoke, and did not care. However, "a steam engine consumes, as it has been usually employed, as great a quantity of coals in one hour as a moderate family does in twelve months". Vegetables in gardens near the Bean Ings mill had been "disfigured and polluted with soot"; linen could not be washed and dried, and dyers had to re-dye. It did appear, though, that Gott's firm had reduced the smoke nuisance somewhat, so that the main discussion in Court concerned the amount of costs which Gott & Sons might be made to pay.

=== Weavers' strike, 1831 ===
In 1826 Gott & Sons reduced their weavers' wages by 15% "with an understanding that they should be advanced when trade improved". Around the end of January 1831, the patient weavers finally applied for the belated wage increase, and were required to wait for two weeks for a reply. Having no answer, they sent a deputation to John and William Gott and their manager Mr Dixon at the compting house in Guildford Street (Benhamin Gott having withdrawn from the matter), along with a list of the expected wage increases – these prices represented on average a 12% wage rise. On its third attempt, the deputation was received at the Bean Ings Mill by William Gott and Dixon, who refused the wage rise. Gott's several hundred weavers then left their looms and went on strike on 15 February 1831. To avoid accusation of theft, the 237 broad cloth weavers completed their assignments and handed in their piecework before leaving. Gott & Sons sacked all the women and children workers who were connected with the weavers. The Evening Mail compared local wages and found that Gott & Sons were on average paying lower wages than neighbouring woollen mills.

=== Business ===
In 1841 Gott was a director of Leeds and Selby Railway Company (LSR), while his brother John was chairman. This was during the time when the LSR was being leased to the York and North Midland Railway.

In 1842 Leeds Town Council held a meeting to discuss local manufacturers' bankruptcies and workers' consequent poverty caused by the Corn Laws, whose effect was to divert trade from Britain to the Continent. A letter from Gott & Son, instancing the diversion of large orders to France and Belgium, was read out at the meeting. 180 local mills and warehouses were now empty, and it was calculated that local wool workers had lost a total of £240,000 (equivalent to £23,464,398 in 2025) per year in wages due to the Corn Laws. Gott & Sons said that they had to close Armley Mills works due to loss of trade.

== The Gott collection ==
William Gott "built up a magnificent collection of rare books, now, unfortunately, dispersed, which included several early editions of the Bible, and Shakespeare's works. His son John inherited the library, which was sold at Sotheby's and dispersed between 1908 and 1910, after John died in 1906. The Leeds Intelligencer said:

[William Gott] was not unmindful of the more refined pursuits of life, and his love of the fine arts formed his chief recreation at home, where he delighted to surround himself with those objects of taste which he had collected from boyhood upwards. But his was not a selfish taste: he had long been a member of the Leeds Philosophical and Literary Society, he was one of its vice-presidents for [1863], and in several ways, and on many occasions he gave significant proof of his appreciation of the objects which that society had been established to promote, by contributing largely in every way to it.

In Gott's collection was Landscape with Cattle by Annibale Carracci. It was exhibited on 22 May 1830 in the Gallery of the Northern Society for the Encouragement of Fine Arts, in Leeds. One surviving part of Gott's collections, now held by the Hepworth Gallery, Wakefield, is a set of artworks which were bound into ten volumes by William Gott and his son John. Their contents consist of "more than 1,200 watercolours, drawings and prints depicting over 200 Yorkshire towns and villages". In the 1930s, the volumes were presented by industrialist Frank Green to the Wakefield Art Gallery. The Gott Collection at the Hepworth has now been digitised, but as of 2021 it was not available online. (Note: The Gott Collection was not available online as of 2021 due to an ongoing software problem.)

Artworks from the Gott Collection at The Hepworth

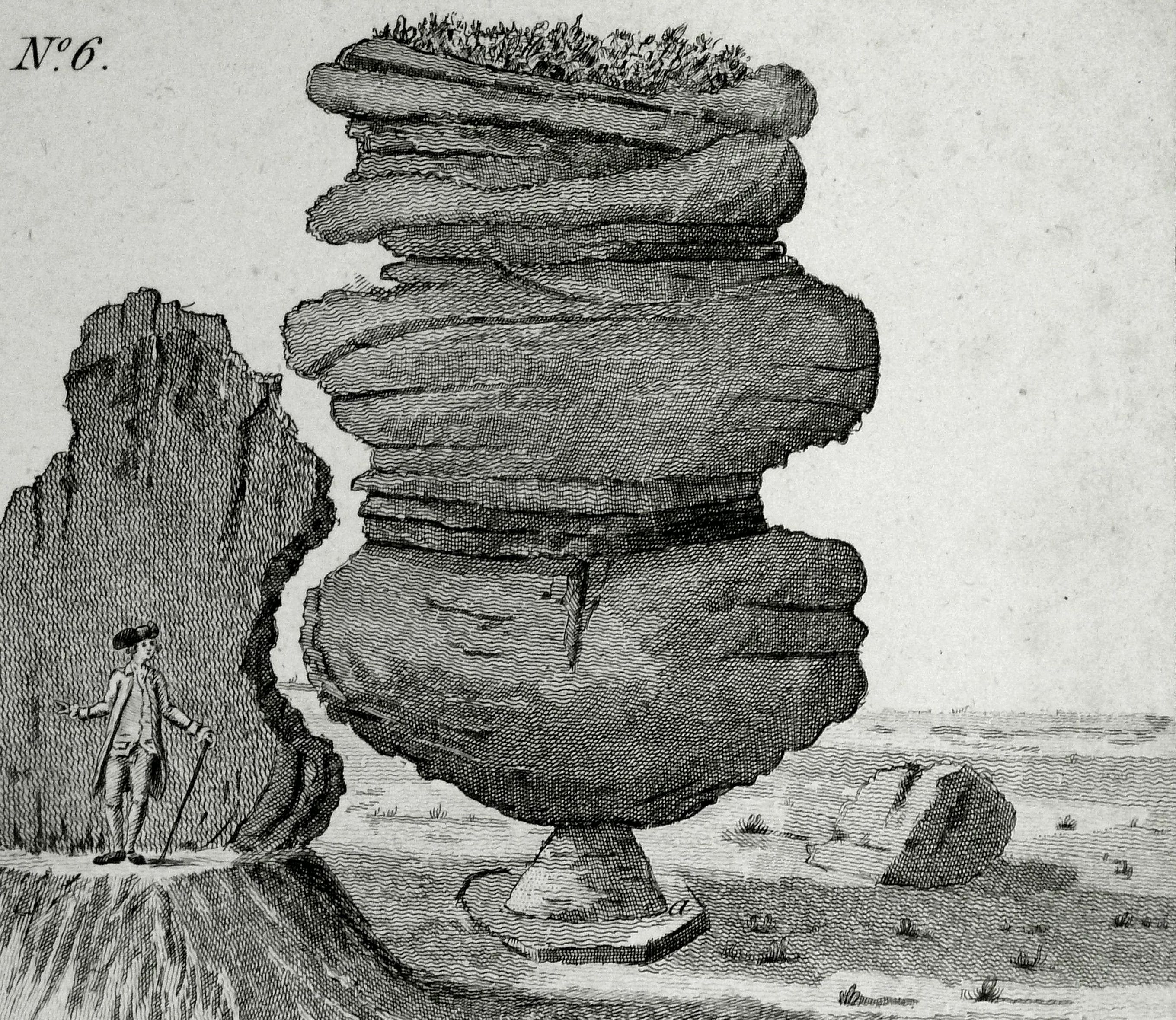
Drawing of Brimham Rocks, by James Basire after Hayman Rooke, 1780s

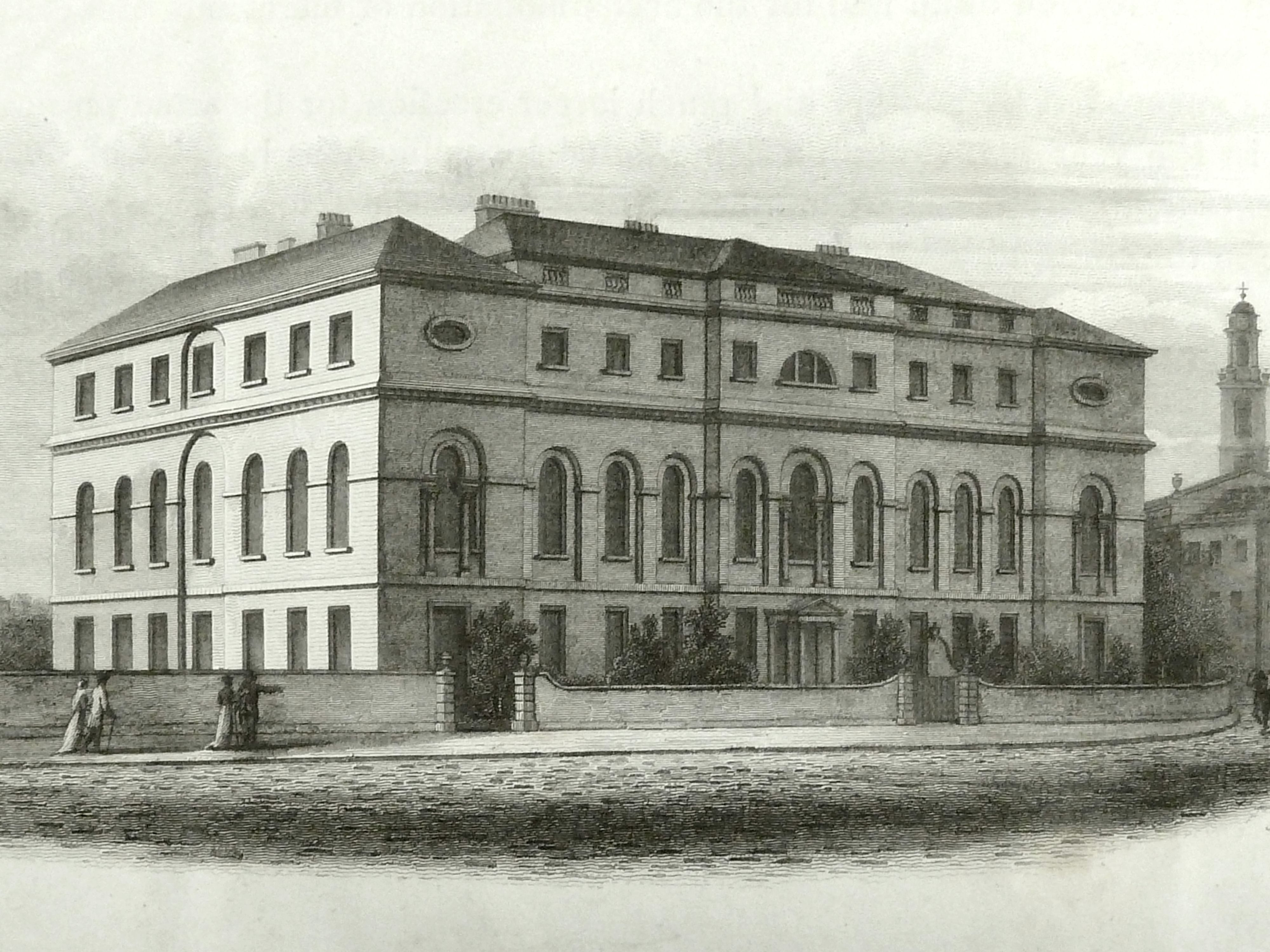
Former Leeds General Infirmary building, by John Le Keux, after Thomas Taylor, early 19th century

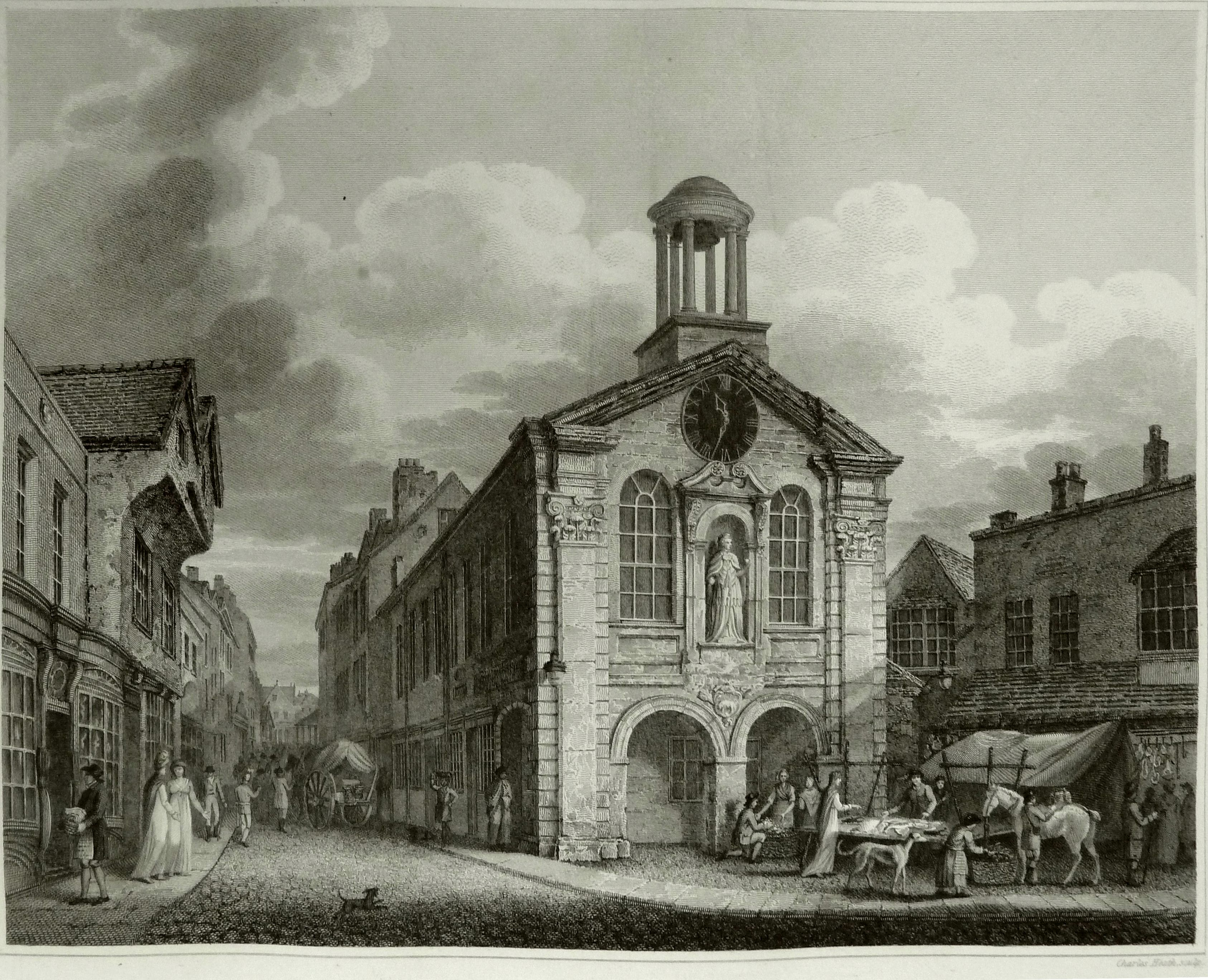
Former Moot Hall in Briggate, by Charles Haith after Thomas Taylor, 1816

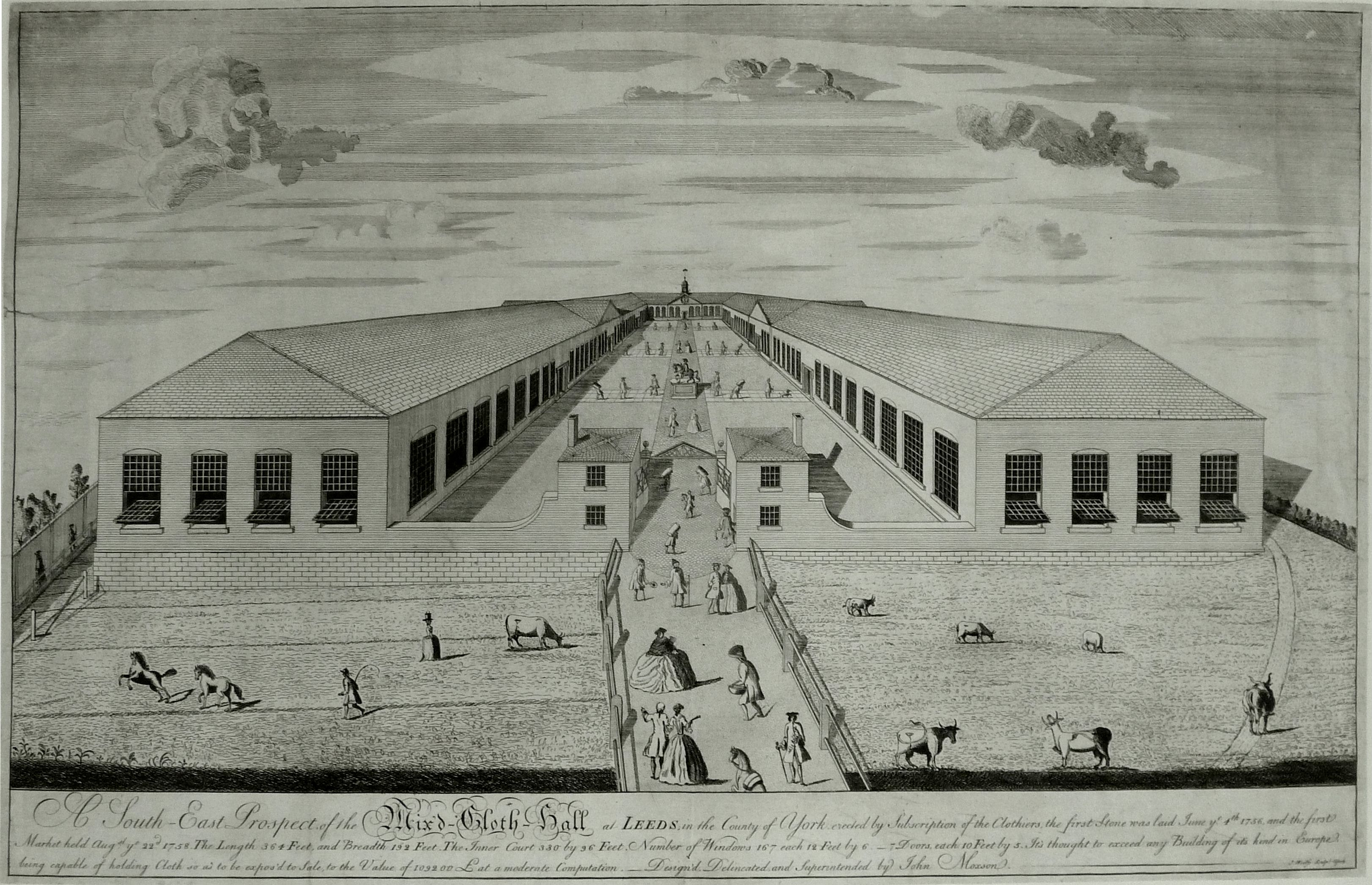
Former Mixed Cloth Hall in Leeds, by John Moxson, 1758

A set of at least 55 drawings from the Gott collection, by Giovanni Battista Piranesi, Francesco Francia, Peregrino da Cesena and other artists, is now in the British Museum.

Sketches from the Gott Collection in the British Museum

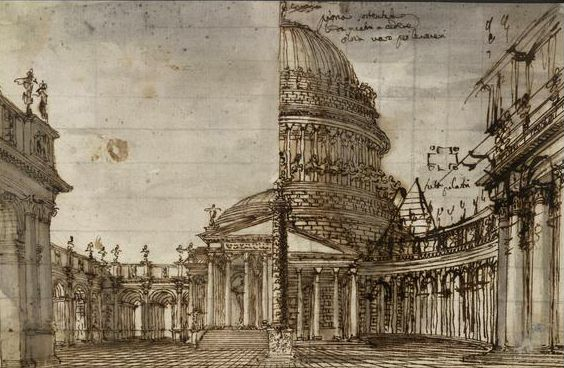
Piranesi, 1742–1743

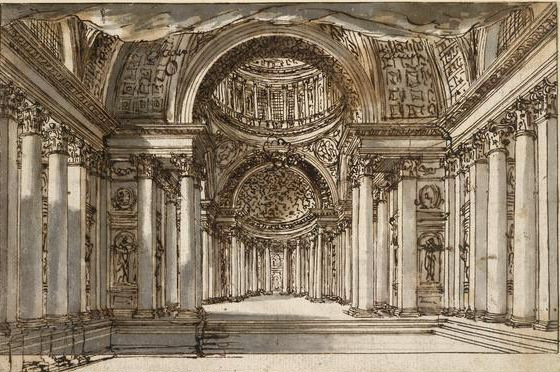
Piranesi, 1740–1743

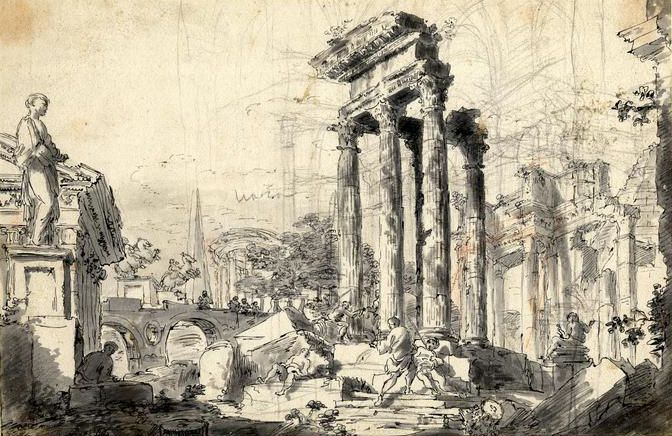
Piranesi, between 1691 and 1765

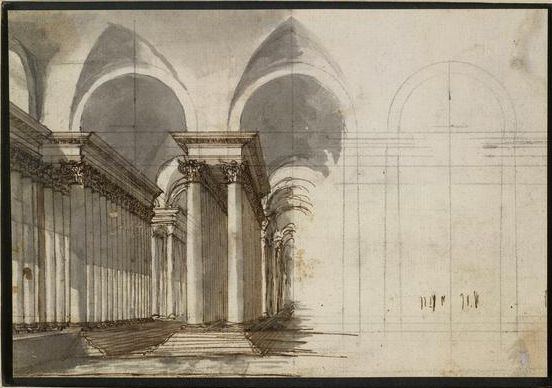
Piranesi, 1740

Gott's distant cousin, sculptor Joseph Gott, created a marble sculpture of William Gott in 1834. William may have travelled to Joseph's studio in Rome to sit for his portrait, which was exhibited in Leeds Art Gallery in 2011. The bust is normally stored at Leeds Discovery Centre. (Note: There is a photograph of Joseph Gott's bust of William Gott here)

The range and depth of Gott's interest can be seen in the following list of items from Gott's collections, exhibited by him at the conversazione of the Leeds Philosophical Society on 16 December 1862. The list is quoted as it appeared in the Leeds Mercury:

=== Early manuscripts ===
- Bible, of the eleventh century, on vellum, illuminated, from the monastery of Justemont, near Metz
- Psalterium, on vellum, illuminated, a Flemish work, dated 1165, in the original binding, with chain to fasten to the desk
- Psalterium of the early part of the fifteenth century, on vellum, illuminated, in the original binding, with piece of fresco inserted, featuring the descent into Egypt; school of Fra Angelico
- Missal, highly illuminated on vellum, Flemish work, about 1430
- Service book from Beverley Cathedral, about the time of the Reformation
- Persian manuscript, much illustrated, with highly finished miniature drawings
- The Koran in Persian and Arabic, with gold borders, written in Persian and Arabic
- Manuscript of Ceylon on the leaf of the talipot palm.

=== English books ===
- Myles Coverdale's Bible, first translation in the English language, 1535
- Tyndale's Testament, 1536
- The first Church of England prayer-book, Edward VI, March 1549
- The second Church of England prayer-book, Edward VI, 1552, approaching nearer to our present form than the previous one
- First collected edition of Shakespeare's works, 1623
- Four of Shakespeare's small 4to single plays, printed for the use of actors, viz., Romeo and Juliet, 1599; Hamlet, 1611; A Midsummer Night's Dream, 1600;
- The Yorkshire Tragedie, not so new as lamentable and true, 1619
- Ben Jonson's Works, presentation copy, with his autograph, first edition, 1616
- Milton's Paradise Lost, first edition, 1667
- Izaak Walton's Angler, first edition, 1653, autograph, presentation copy
- A long manuscript letter from Ralph Thoresby, written on the back of a sheet of letter-press of his History of Leeds
- A letter from John Harrison, the builder and endower of the late Leeds Grammar School; also of St John's Church and Alms-houses, which bear his name; in the same sheet some remarks by Laxton, the founder of Rawdon Church, (Note: This is St Peter's Church, Rawdon, West Yorkshire, built by Francis Layton in 1645) and to whom Harrison's letter is addressed, dated 1650.

=== Specimens of early printing ===
- Biblia pauperum, block printing, before the invention of type printing; date about 1430
- Golden Legend, containing the principle events in the Bible; printed and translated by William Caxton, first English printer, 1483; a specimen of the English language in the reign of Richard III
- Dives et Pauper, a commentary on the Ten Commandments, written by a monk at Doncaster, in the reign of Edward IV, considered a fine specimen of the language of that period, printed by Wynkyn de Worde, second English printer, 1496
- Robinson Crusoe, a complete set of the newspapers in which the story first appeared, 1719. The Spectator, the original newspapers in which it first appeared, 1711–1712.

=== Three oil pictures ===
- Burns' Cotters' Saturday Night, by C. Cope
- Keeping the Birthday of James Hogg, the Ettrick Shepherd, by Sir William Allan, the scene represented being a group of fishermen, in which are introduced Sir Walter Scott, Professor Wilson, Sir A. Nasmyth, and other celebrities, all from life
- The Last Judgment (the side of the blessed), copied by Vincenzo della Brema, from the picture by Fra Angelico in the Academia at Florence. The small heads in the frame are from the group of the Apostles, the centre one in the lower part of the frame being the portrait of the painter himself.

=== Other items ===
- Paintings in water colours &c
- Three large and beautiful bronze vases from the Summer Palace at Pekin, illustrating early Chinese art
- A pair of handsome Japanese vases, and other curiosities from China and Japan
- Several interesting contributions purchased from the 1862 International Exhibition. (Note: This included the Leeds Tiger, but possibly also included the Leeds Irish Elk and the bones of a hippopotamus which were donated by Gott, but of which the provenance is unknown)

== Philanthropy ==
William Gott was a public benefactor, being a "liberal contributor" to local Leeds charities, although he did not lead a public life. "He did much good without ostentation, had a warm attachment to his native town, and loved to see its progress and improvement". The Leeds Intelligencer said, "Mr Gott was a man of generous spirit, and of unostentatious habits".

Around 1841, Gott paid for the Thoresby monument, "a model of what a Gothic monument ought to be" designed by Robert Dennis Chantrell, in Leeds Parish Church. As executors of the will of Abigail Rhodes of Armley House, the brothers passed on £50 (equivalent to £5,256.36 in 2025) for the benefit of Leeds Dispensary, in 1845. In the same year, Gott paid for the replacement of rented box pews with free pews for all, in the former St Paul's Church, Park Square, Leeds (demolished 1906). In 1863 Gott and his brother John subscribed £1,000 (equivalent to £108,631 in 2025) each to the building of Leeds Infirmary. The brothers also gave £500 (equivalent to £52,564 in 2025) in 1862 towards the extension of Leeds Philosophical Hall, (Note: Leeds Philosophical Hall, Park Row, Leeds, was the Leeds Museum building, now demolished) and in 1865 they contributed to the construction of Leeds Mechanics Institute. The Leeds Intelligencer reported that William Gott also supported his factory's workpeople: "He sought and laboured for their comfort in every way", and he also suggested a plan to create allotment gardens for mill hands.

Gott was "a most munificent benefactor" towards the Leeds Philosophical and Literary Society, and he was one of its vice presidents. In 1862, Gott donated a "beautiful collection of manuscripts", a taxidermy-mounted Bengal tiger, now known as the Leeds Tiger, and a "fine fossil of the great Irish elk" to the Leeds Philosophical Society.

Rev. J.S. Metcalfe said:

[Gott] was well known, not only as one of the chief employers of labour, but also from his repeated acts of liberality to those who were in want and had become infirm in his own service ... Of his munificence we may truly say his left hand knew not what his right hand did. His aim was ever to promote the social, moral and religious advancement of the working classes ... He was almost in the foremost rank in helping forward any public work, and striving to place his native town in a position worthy of its importance ... he was truly a goodly flower.

The Western Times said that Gott was a "liberal supporter" of Torquay's local charities.

=== Works funded or co-funded by William Gott ===
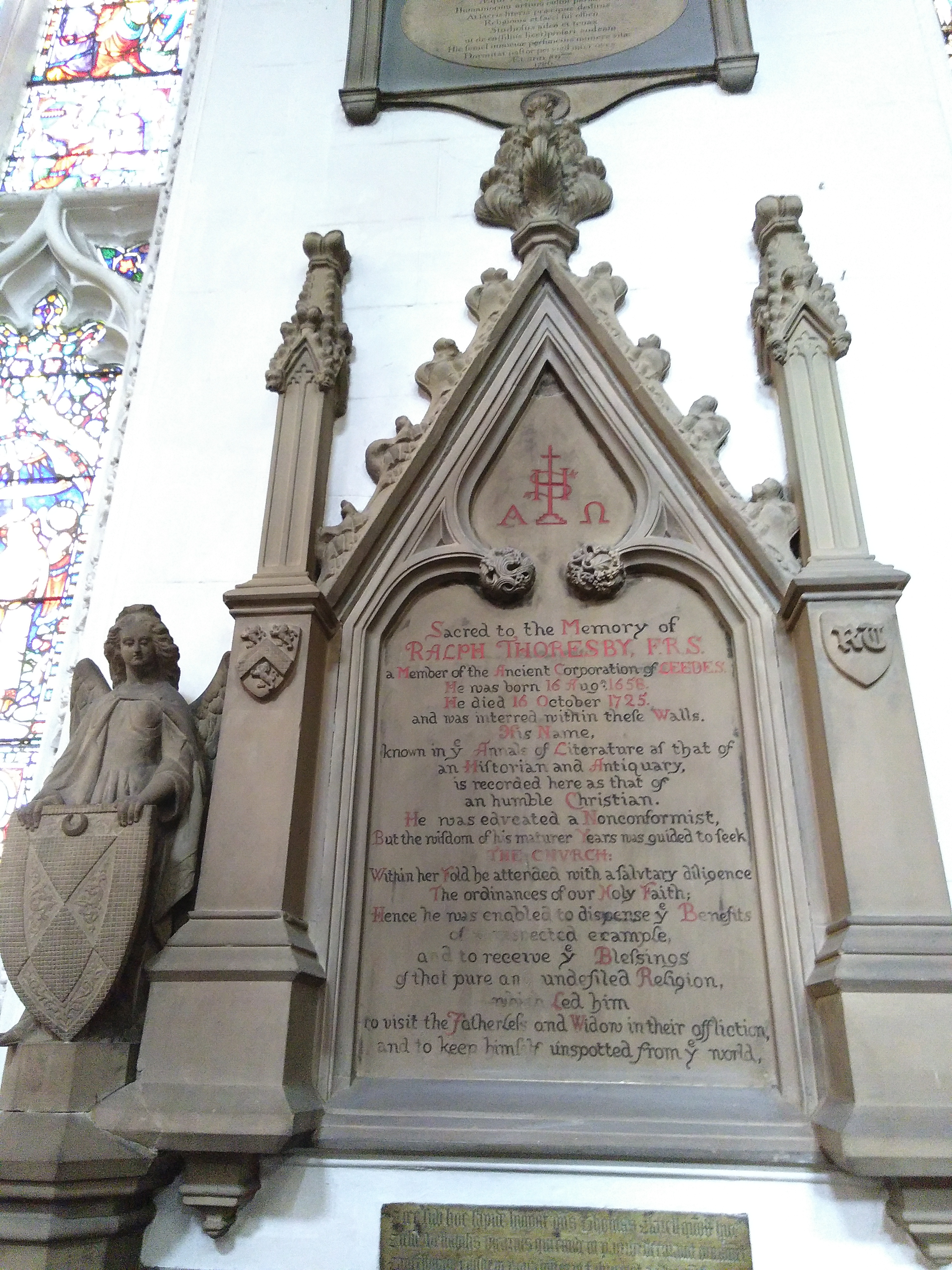
Ralph Thoresby monument, Leeds Minster, 1841

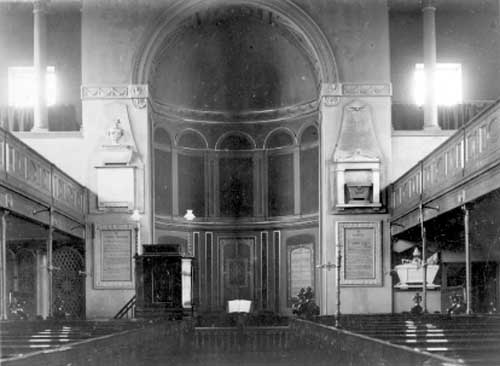
Former St Paul's church pews, Park Square, Leeds, 1845

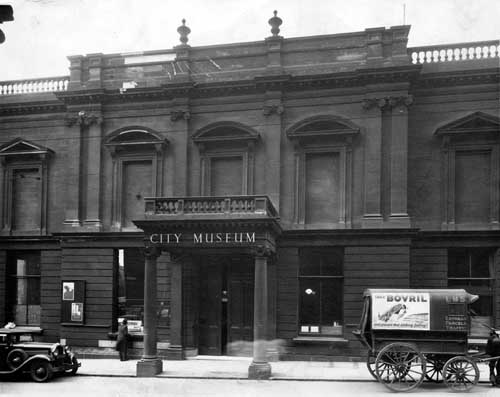
Extension to the Philosophical Hall (former Leeds Museum, Park Row), 1862

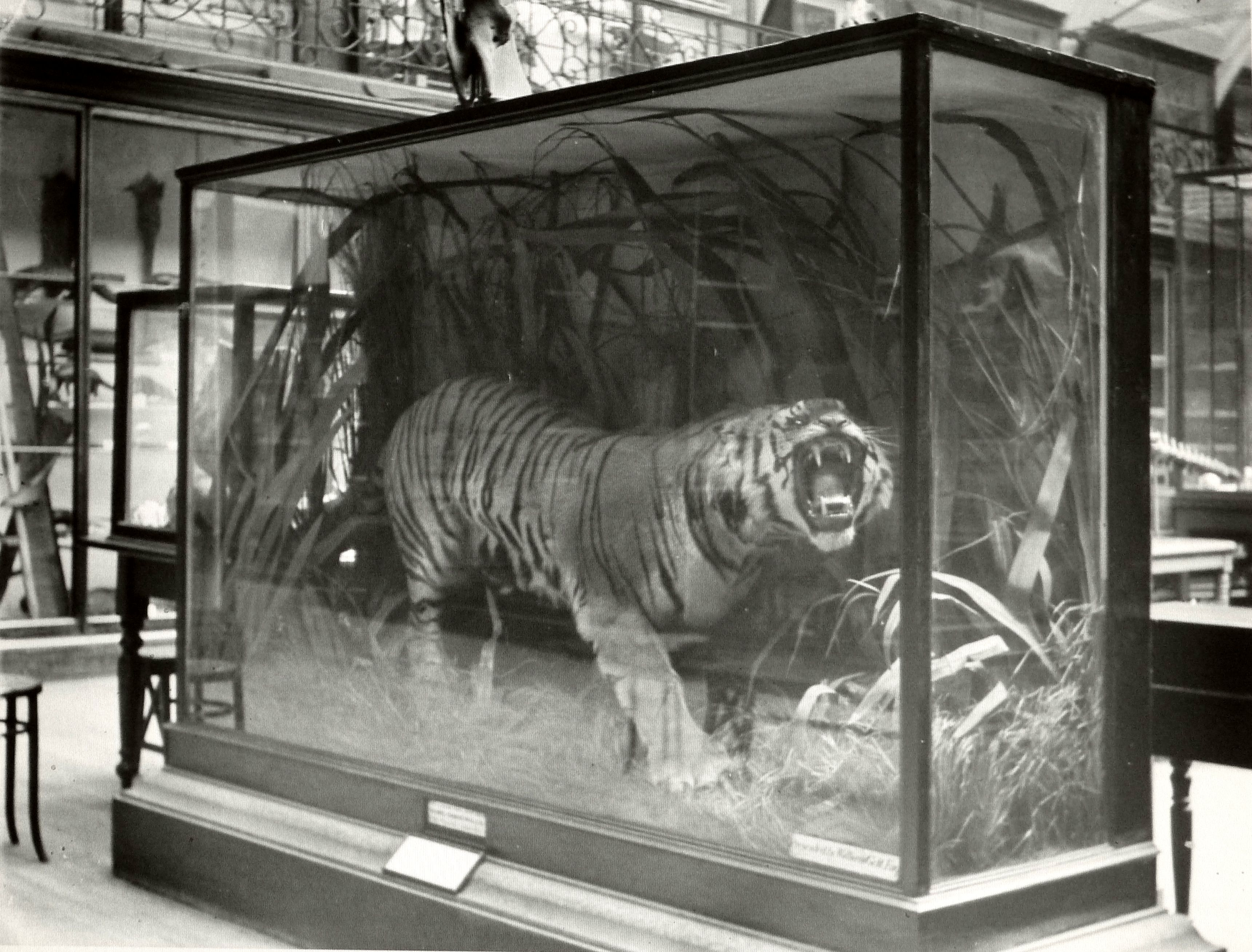
Leeds Tiger, 1862

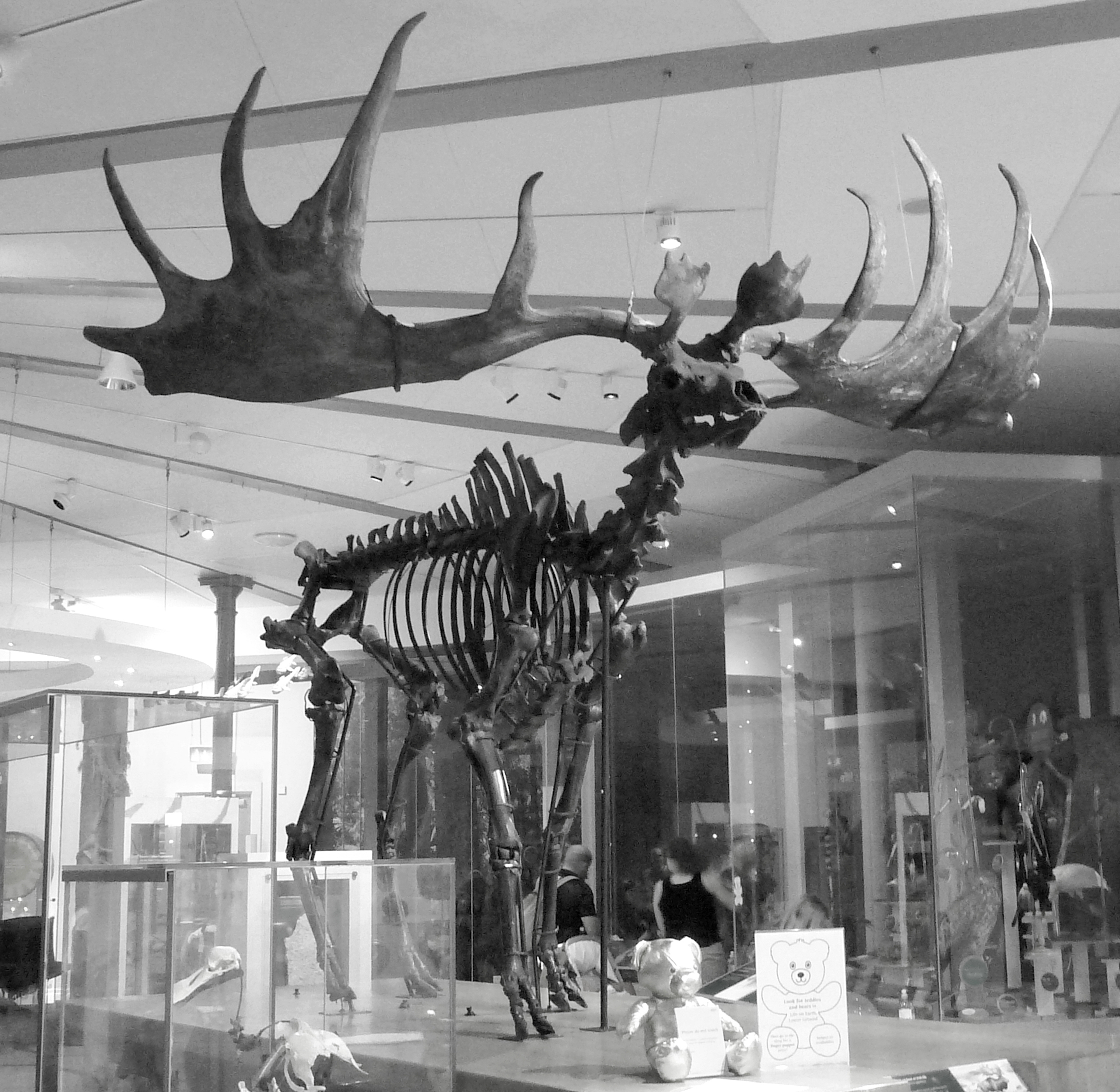
Leeds Irish Elk, 1862

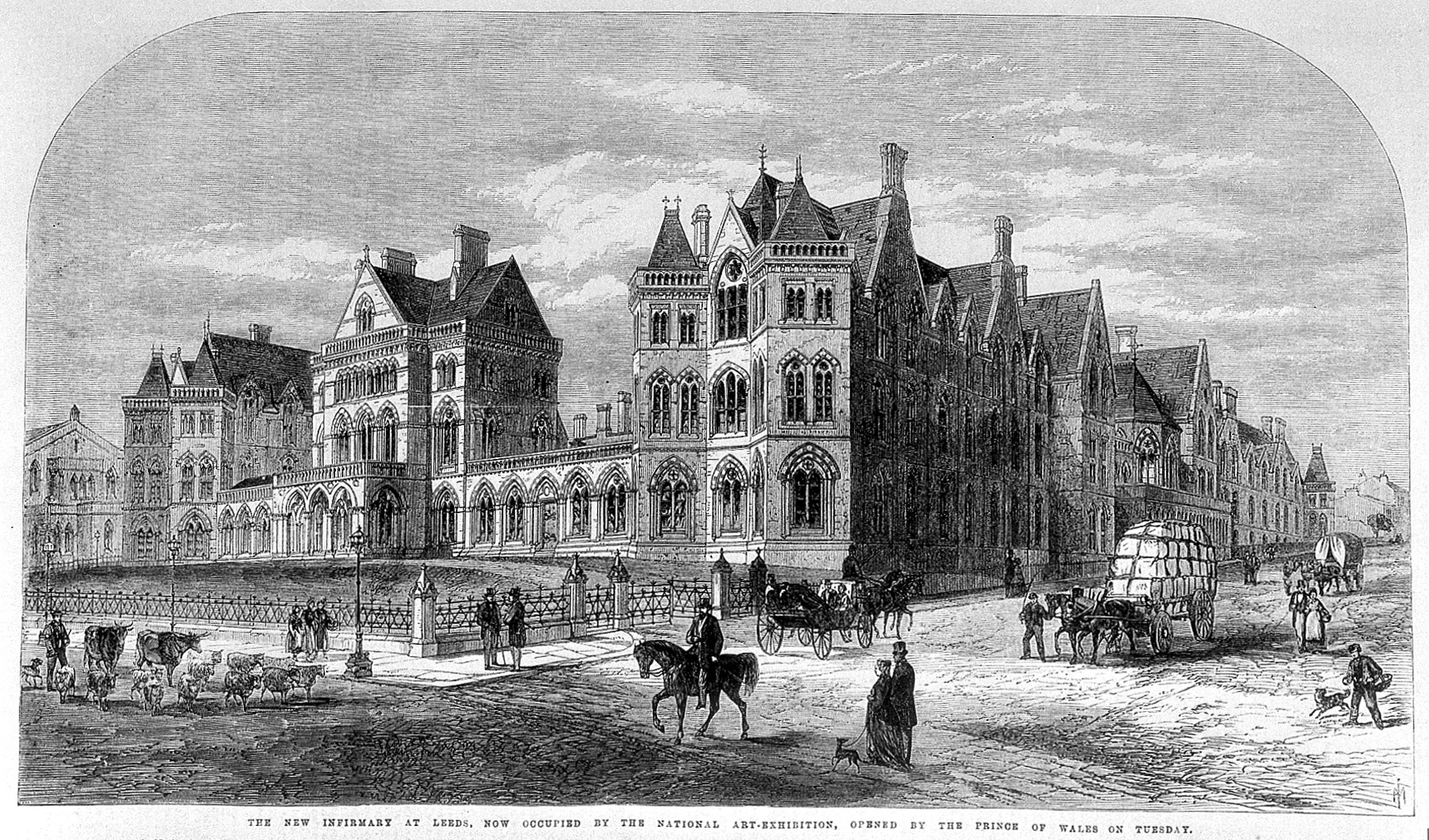
Leeds Infirmary, 1863

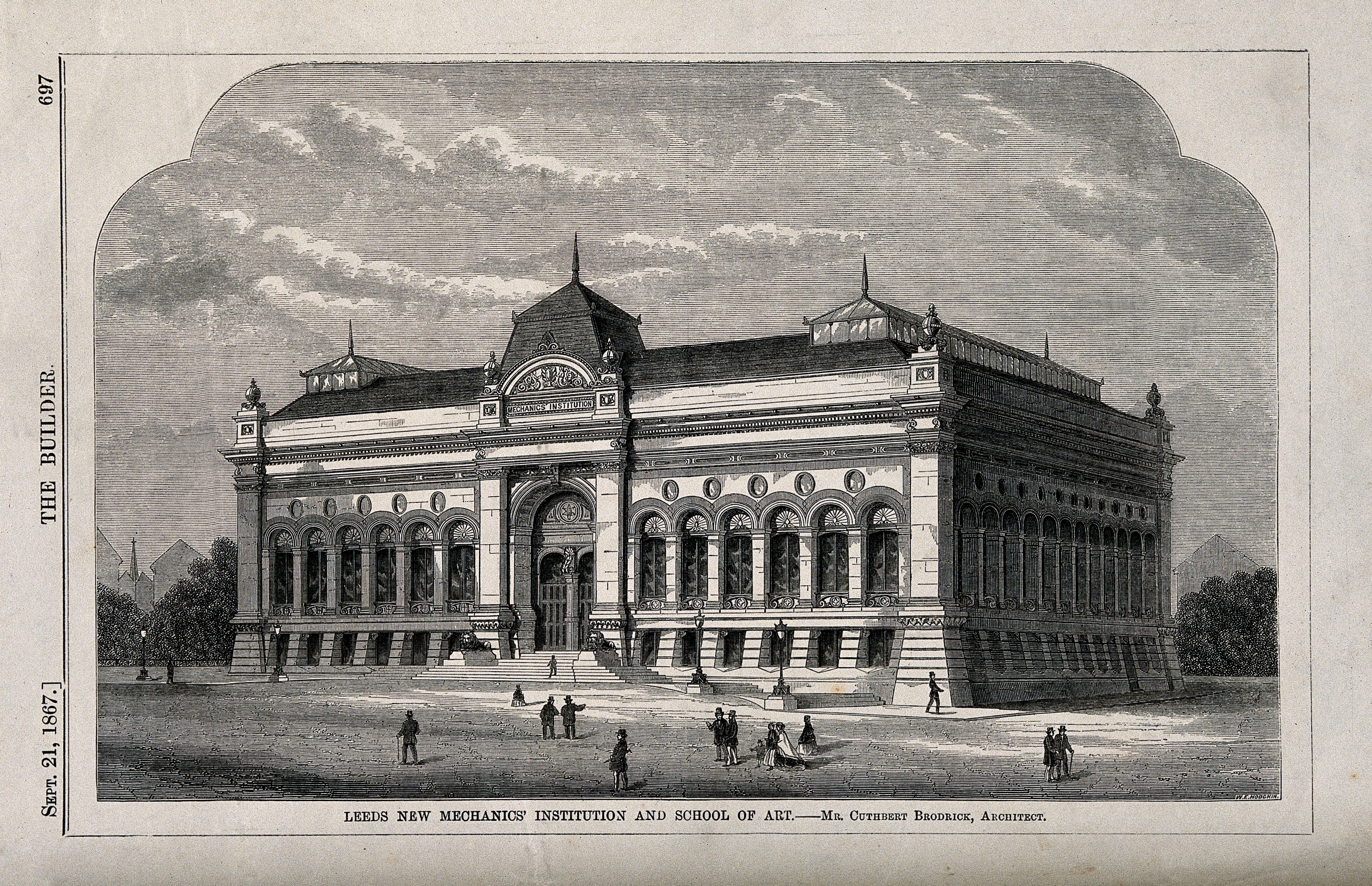
Leeds Mechanics Institute, 1865
