= Gotts Park Mansion =

Mansion in Gotts Park, Leeds, West Yorkshire, England

Coordinates: 53.805231°N 1.601209°W

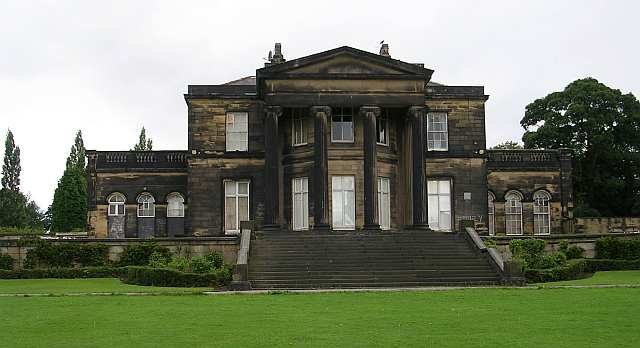
Mansion at Armley Park

Gotts Park Mansion, formerly known as Armley House, is a Grade II listed country house in Armley Park, 3 miles from Leeds city centre. Formerly the home of industrialist Benjamin Gott, it is now the home of Gotts Park Golf Club.

The mansion was built in 1781 for Leeds merchant, Thomas Woolrick. Gott, a wealthy mill-owner, first leased the mansion then bought it in 1812. Gott commissioned Humphry Repton to improve the house and landscape. The mansion was then remodelled, partly to Repton's plan, by Robert Smirke, architect of the British Museum. Thus it became the first Greek Revival house built in West Yorkshire.

Gott's descendants lived in the mansion until the 1900s when, in 1903 it was rented by the Leeds Association for the Prevention and Cure of Tuberculosis and in 1904 opened and named The Leeds Hospital for Consumptives. It was used as a TB hospital during the First World War.

In 1928, the building and grounds were taken over by Leeds City Council on a 999-year lease, on the condition that they be used as a leisure space for the people of Leeds. Gotts Park Golf Club opened to the public on 8 April 1933.
