= Benjamin Gott =

British industrialist (1762–1840)

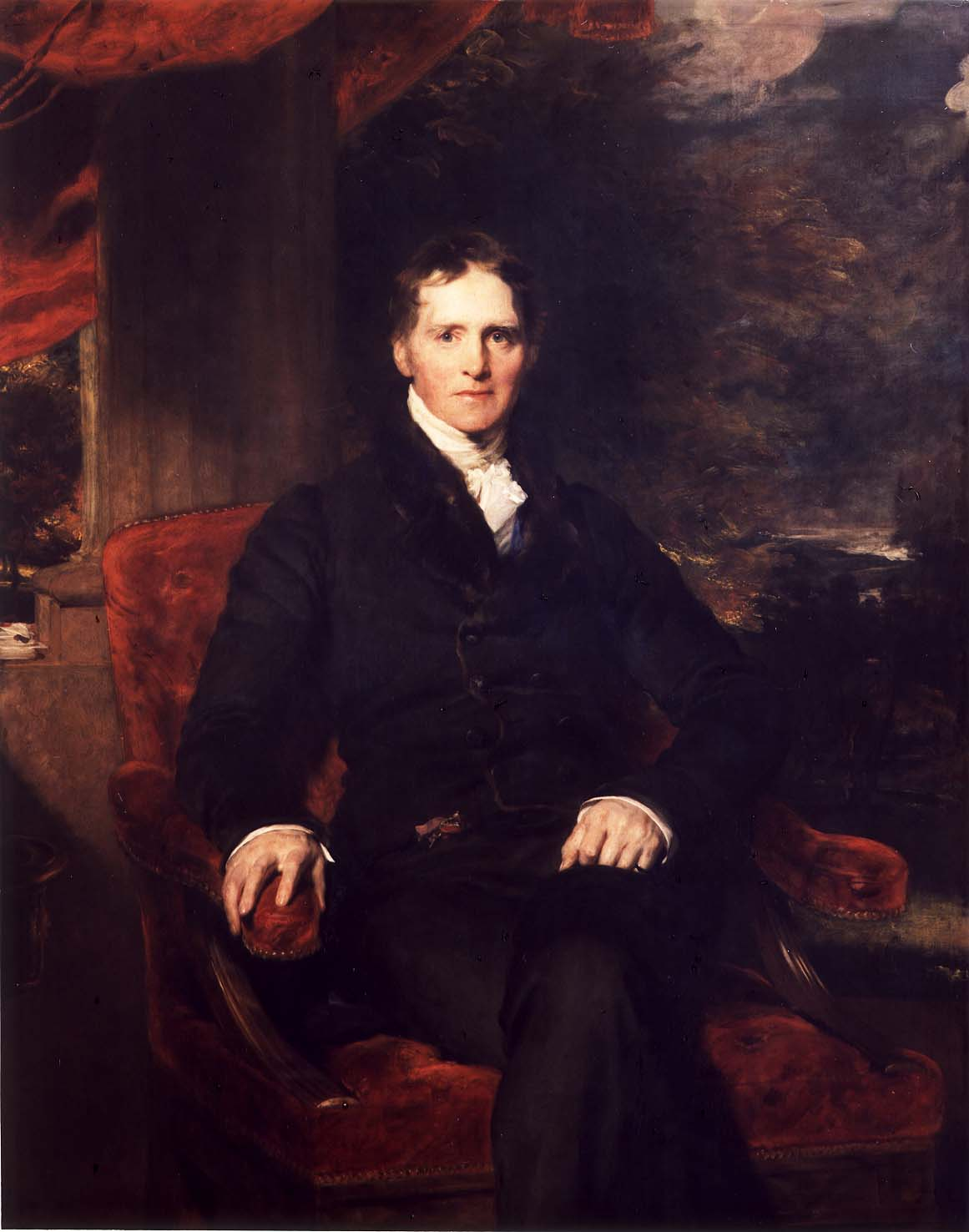
Benjamin Gott

Benjamin Gott (24 June 1762 – 14 February 1840) was one of the leading figures in the Industrial Revolution, in the field of textiles. His factory at Armley Mills, Armley, Leeds, was once the largest factory in the world and is now home to the Leeds Industrial Museum at Armley Mills.

== Early life ==
Gott was born in Calverley, Pudsey in West Yorkshire, England, to John Gott who was a civil engineer and county surveyor. Benjamin was sent to Bingley Grammar School until he was 17. When he finished school in 1780, his father apprenticed him to Wormald & Fountaine, wool merchants. His sons John and William Gott joined Gott & Sons and managed the company from about 1825.

== Life ==
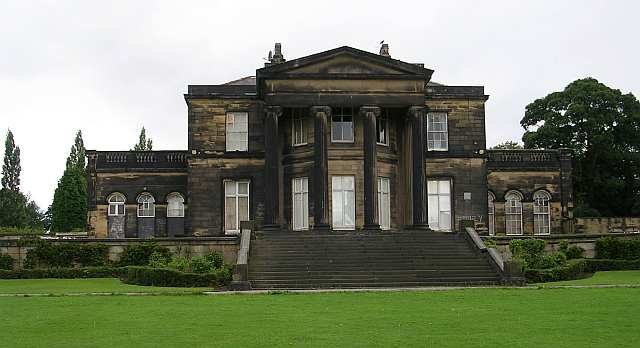
Gotts Park Mansion aka Armley House

Gott's most notable contribution to the industrial revolution happened at Armley Mills, which he leased in 1804. The mill had been badly damaged by fire when he bought the ruins and ordered that the rebuilding include cast iron internal frames and other fireproofing measures. When the repairs were completed in 1805, the new factory was the largest wool factory in the world.

Gott experimented with new ways of making wool cloth, introducing innovations such as using steam power and power looms. Gott made a large fortune, and he reinvested much of it back into improving his mills and buying new ones. He also founded almshouses in Armley, collected fine art, and presided over the founding of the Leeds Philosophical & Literary Society in 1819.

His other mills included Bean Ings (1792), the first wool factory, Burley Mills (1798), and St Ann's Mills (1824).

Gott became Mayor of Leeds in 1799, and, by the time he died in 1840, he was a millionaire. His home from 1812, Armley House (now Gotts Park Mansion) and grounds designed by Humphrey Repton overlooked the Kirkstall Valley and the Leeds and Liverpool Canal from the Armley side. In 1928, Gott's house and grounds were leased by Leeds City Council to create a municipal golf course and Armley Park.

He died on 14 February 1840. He is buried in Armley Parish church. The tomb, with his recumbent figure, is sculpted by his son Joseph Gott.

== Family ==
He was father of Joseph Gott and William Gott.

He was grandfather to John Gott.

He was great grandfather to Beryl Katherine Gott, née Robins, who married her cousin Frank Gott. Frank Gott was Lord Mayor of Leeds, 1917–1918. Beryl was Lady Mayoress and she also became Leeds' first woman alderman and one of the first four women magistrates to be appointed to the Leeds Bench.
