= Armley =

District of Leeds, England

Coordinates: 53.7981°N 1.5872°W

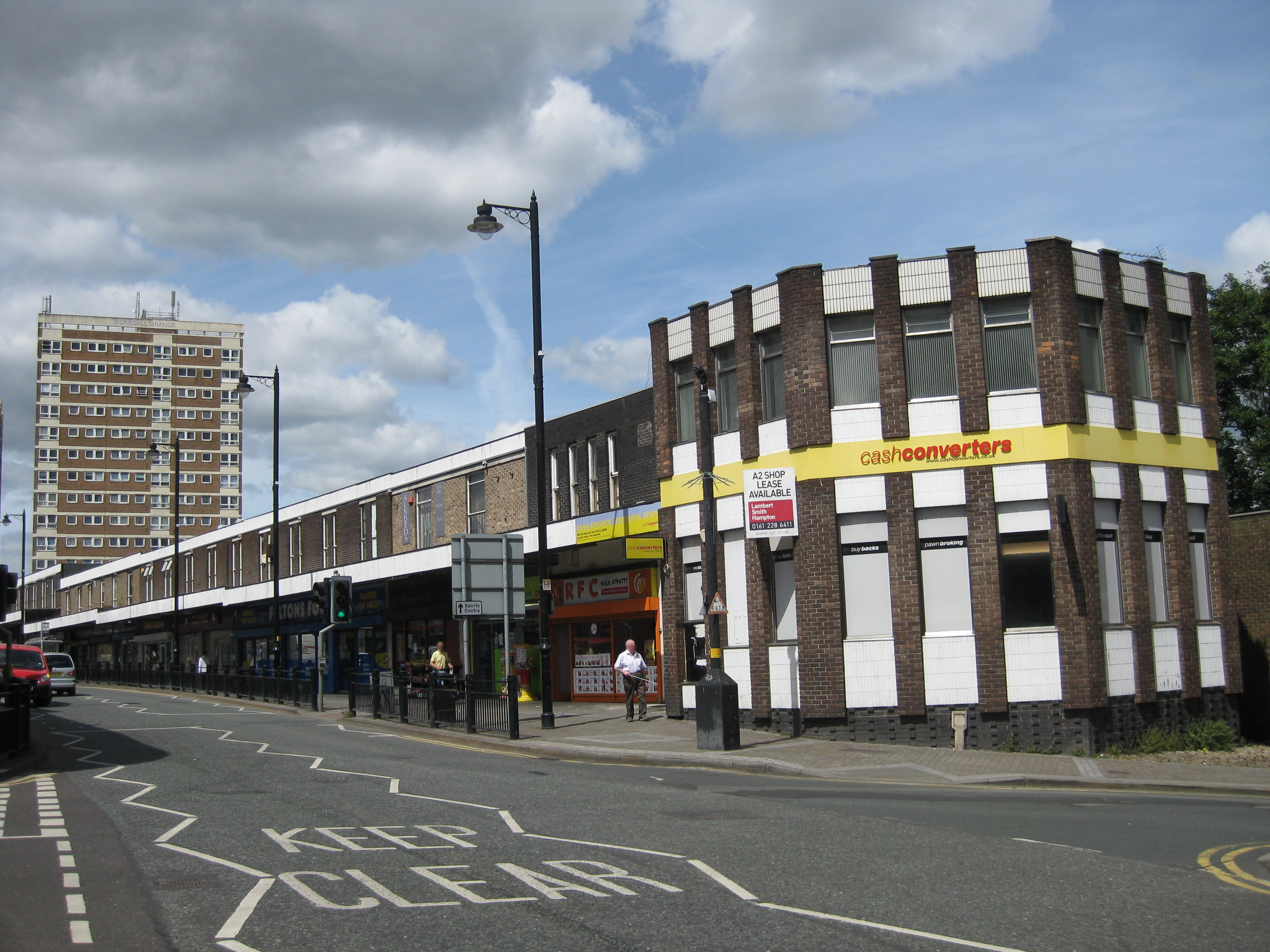
- Town Street

- Location within West Yorkshire
- Population: 25,550 (2011 census)
- OS grid reference: SE271335
- Metropolitan borough: City of Leeds
- Metropolitan county: West Yorkshire
- Region: Yorkshire and the Humber
- Country: England
- Sovereign state: United Kingdom
- Post town: LEEDS
- Postcode district: LS12
- Dialling code: 0113
- Police: West Yorkshire
- Fire: West Yorkshire
- Ambulance: Yorkshire
- UK Parliament: Leeds West and Pudsey

Armley is a district in the west of Leeds, West Yorkshire, England. It starts less than 1 mile (1.6 km) from Leeds city centre. Like much of Leeds, Armley grew in the Industrial Revolution and had several mills, one of which now houses the Leeds Industrial Museum at Armley Mills. Armley was historically – and predominantly still is – a largely working-class area of the city; it retains a number of smaller industrial businesses, and has multiple rows of back-to-back terraced houses.

It sits in the Armley ward of Leeds City Council and Leeds West and Pudsey parliamentary constituency.

In 2022, statistics released by West Yorkshire Police revealed Armley and New Wortley had the second highest crime rate in Leeds after Leeds city centre.

== Etymology ==
First attested in Domesday Book of 1086 as Ermelai, the name Armley comes from Old English. The second element is from Old English lēah ('open space in a wood'). The origin of the first element is less clear, but thought to come from an otherwise unattested Old English name Earma, a plausible nickname form of the name Earnmund. If so, the name originally meant 'Earma's woodland clearing'.

Historically lying within the township of Armley, to the south of Armley's centre, the district of Green Side is first mentioned by this name in the nineteenth century. The origin of the name is not certain, but is probably named after the green space now constituted as Wortley Recreation Ground and Western Flatts Cliff park.

== History ==
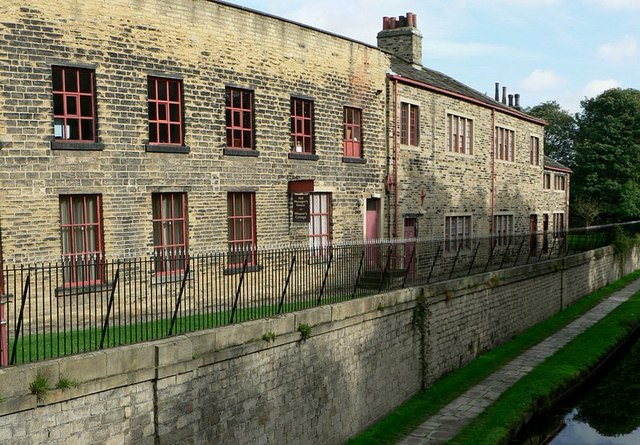
Leeds Industrial Museum at Armley Mills

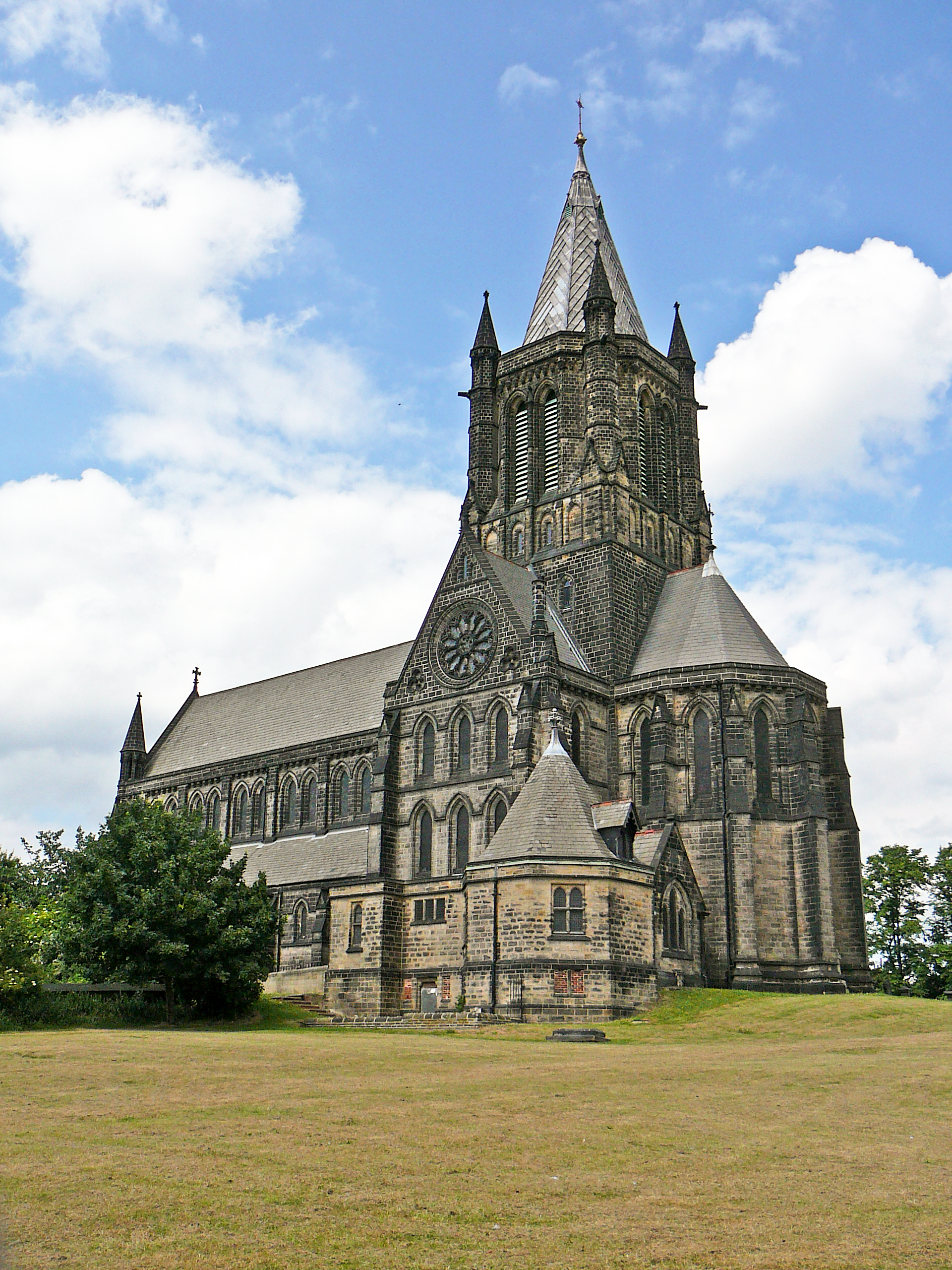
St Bartholomew's Church, Armley

Armley is mentioned in the 1086 Domesday Book reference to "Ristone, Ermelai". At the time there were eight villagers in Ristone (now east Armley) and Ermelai (now west Armley). Armley was recorded as lying within the hundred of Morley and was estimated to comprise only four households, placing it in the bottom fifth of settlements in the Domesday Book by population size. The actual population is indeterminable as this only accounts for the 'head of household'.

Armley Mills, now the Leeds Industrial Museum, was the world's largest woollen mill when it was built in 1788. In the 18th and 19th centuries Armley was, through its mills, a major contributor to the economy of the city of Leeds. Many of the buildings standing in and around Armley were built in the 1800s, including many of the churches, schools, shops and houses. Ledgard Way is named after the entrepreneur Samuel Ledgard. Armley also has picturesque views over the rest of Leeds from certain vantage points. William Tetley started his business of malters in Armley in the 1740s. His grandson Joshua Tetley founded Tetley's Brewery in Hunslet in 1822.

Armley was formerly a township and chapelry in the parish of Leeds. In 1866 Armley became a separate civil parish, but on 26 March 1904 the parish was abolished to form Armley and Bramley. In 1901 the parish had a population of 27,521.

Damage caused by a raid in the Leeds Blitz in March 1941 and later slum clearance schemes brought about the redevelopment of much of Armley in a programme beginning in the 1950s and finishing in the early 1970s.

From the 1870s until 1956, Armley was home to the J W Roberts asbestos mattress and boiler lining factory. This facility exposed residents to asbestos fibres and resulted in a mesothelioma cancer cluster which persists to this day. One of the victims, June Hancock, launched a court action against Turner & Newall, the company that owned the J W Roberts' factory in 1993. Although the court case was successful, corporate restructuring had, as of 2005, avoided the case being settled. Hancock's story was the subject of a play, Dust, by Kenneth F. Yates, performed in Armley and at the West Yorkshire Playhouse in July 2009.

The parish church, St Bartholomew's, is home to a notable pipe organ built by the German organ builder Edmund Schulze. Originally built for Meanwood Towers in 1866–69, it was opened by S. S. Wesley. It was moved to St Bartholomew's in 1879. Schulze's work, and this organ in particular, had enormous influence on the development of British organ building in the 19th century. Both church and organ have been restored. The smaller Christ Church is located at the end of Theaker Lane nearer the centre of Armley.

Legend has it that a pedlar called Charlie used to rest and water his pony and trap in Whingate Park in the 19th century. He apparently sold spicy shortbread to the citizens of Upper Armley for 1d a piece. Today the triangular-shaped park is known as Charlie or Charley Cake Park. According to Armley Through the Camera, written in 1901, the park was "within memory of many present residents of Armley, a patch of wasteland. Some of them regularly played cricket on its turf".

There were two railway stations in Armley. Armley Canal Road railway station on the line between Leeds and Shipley closed in 1965, and Armley Moor railway station on the line between Leeds and Bradford Exchange closed in 1966.

== Geography ==
Armley is located between the M621 motorway and the River Aire, stretching from roughly the New Wortley roundabout (the Armley Gyratory) to the start of the Stanningley By-pass and Cockshott Lane where it merges into Bramley.

== Amenities ==
Armley Town Street includes high street names, charity shops and food and independent retailers. There are bus links to Leeds, Bradford, Pudsey and Whinmoor. Armley's Town Street has free off-road car parking, but parking is mainly on-street, with few car parks in the centre. Armley's only supermarket is a LIDL on Armley Road, but Aldi in neighbouring Wortley is a five-minute walk from Town Street.

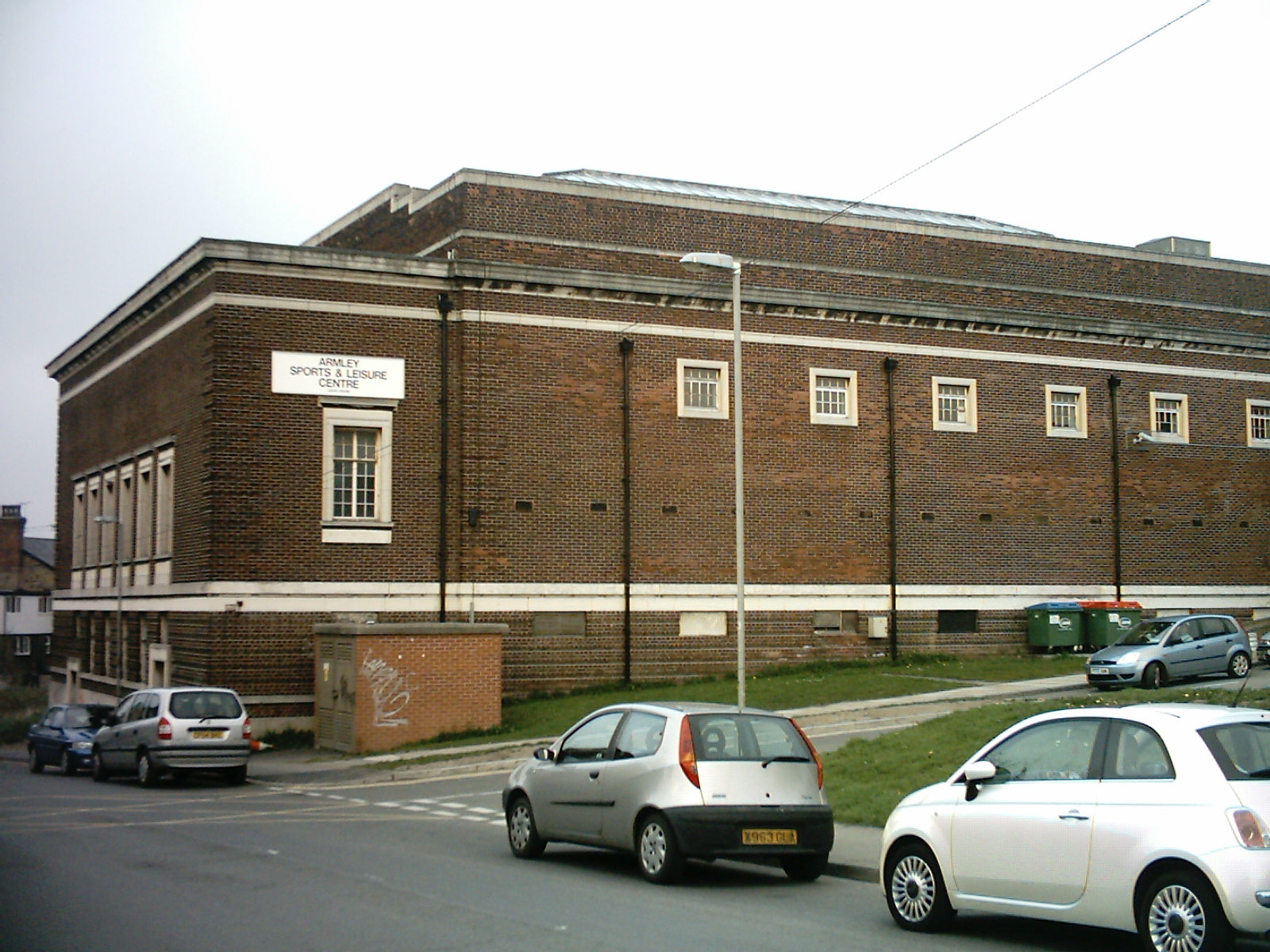
The former Armley Sports and Leisure Centre

Other amenities include Armley (Gott's) Park, Gott's Park Golf Club and Armley Mills Industrial Museum, and a number of former cinemas and churches. The old Methodist chapel is now a carpet outlet, like a similar chapel in Holbeck. There are present-day Methodist churches in Wesley Road, built in 1987, and in Whingate, built in 1884. The Wesley Road Chapel is a Local Ecumenical Partnership also involving the Baptist and United Reformed Churches. The current church is the fourth on this site, where the original Methodist Wesleyan chapel stood and where John Wesley once preached.

Armley's original leisure centre, based on the old Armley swimming baths, was demolished in 2009. The land is now a large car park for the new leisure centre. The closure of the original 25-metre swimming pool with redundant and unused space attracted some controversy because of the age and local architectural significance of the building. HM Prison Leeds, formerly Armley Gaol, is located in Armley.

== Housing ==
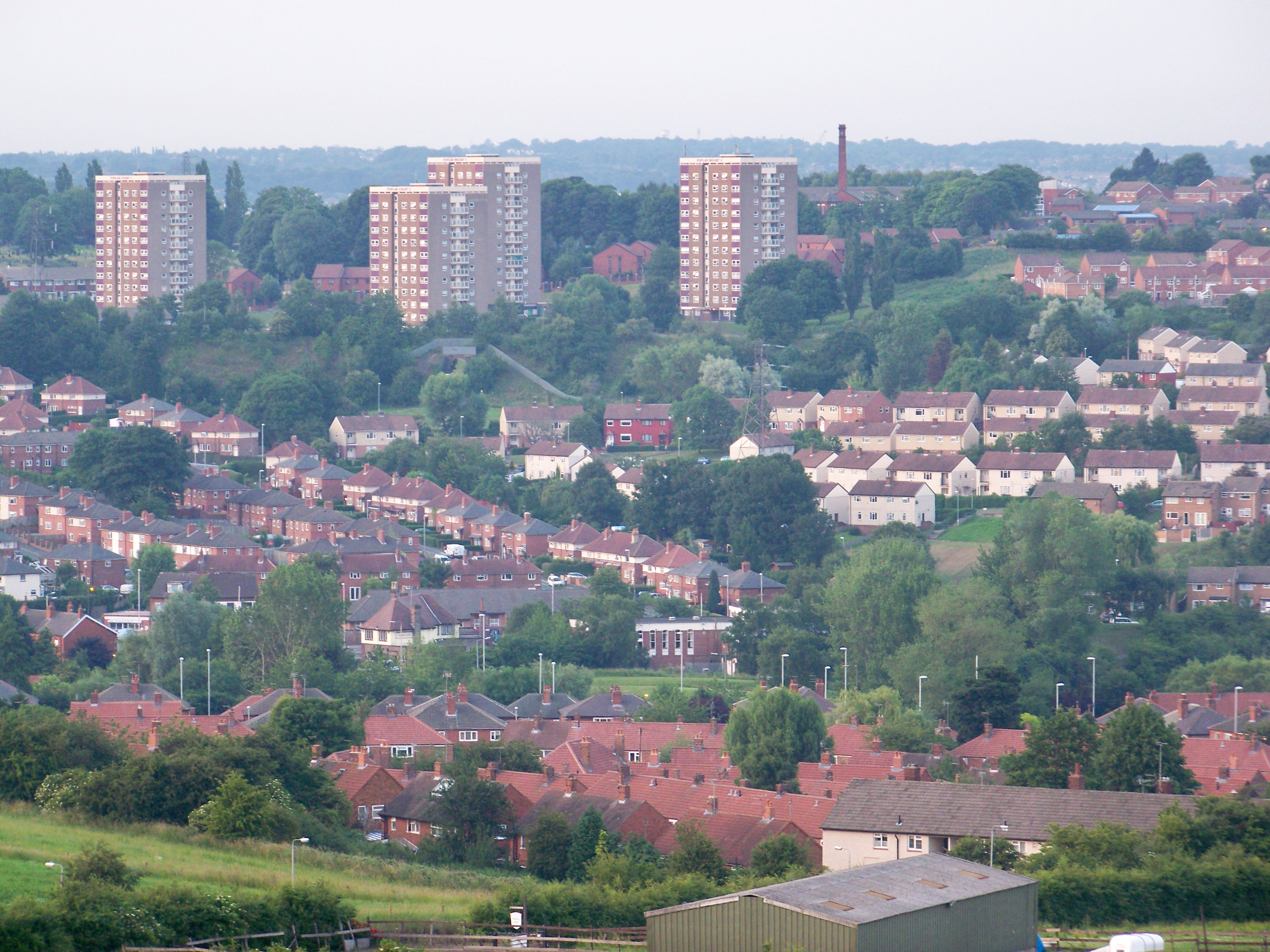
A view of Western Armley

Armley housing includes Victorian back-to-back houses, through terraces and tower blocks. There is much council housing, although most of the housing stock is privately built and dates from the 1960s. Back-to-back housing has been converted to through terraces.

Corporation residential tower blocks, built to replace older housing stock at the centre of Armley, and neighbouring Wortley, are amongst the tallest in Leeds.

== Notable people ==
- Alfred Atkinson VC – born in Armley in 1874
- Alan Bennett – playwright
- Barbara Taylor Bradford – novelist
- Diana Coupland – film and television actress and singer; born and lived on Tennant Street, Armley
- William Boynton Butler VC, Croix de Guerre – born in Armley in 1894
- Chumbawamba – band; lived in Armley for some time
- Lily Elsie – actress; born in Armley in 1886
- Benjamin Gott and William Gott – mill owners in Armley
- Geoff Gunney – professional rugby league footballer who played for Great Britain and Yorkshire and at club level for Hunslet
- Adam Lowe – poet and LGBT+ History Month Poet Laureate; was raised in the area
- Alison Lowe – former Labour councillor for Armley (1990–2019) and current Deputy Mayor for Policing and Crime in West Yorkshire (2021–); lived in the area
- Alice Nutter – writer and musician, who lived in Armley beginning in 1982

== In popular culture ==
The tank scene in the 1963 film Billy Liar was filmed in Wellington Road, Armley, and local residents were employed as extras.

== See also ==
- Listed buildings in Leeds (Armley Ward)
