= HM Prison Leeds =

Prison in West Yorkshire, England

HMP Leeds
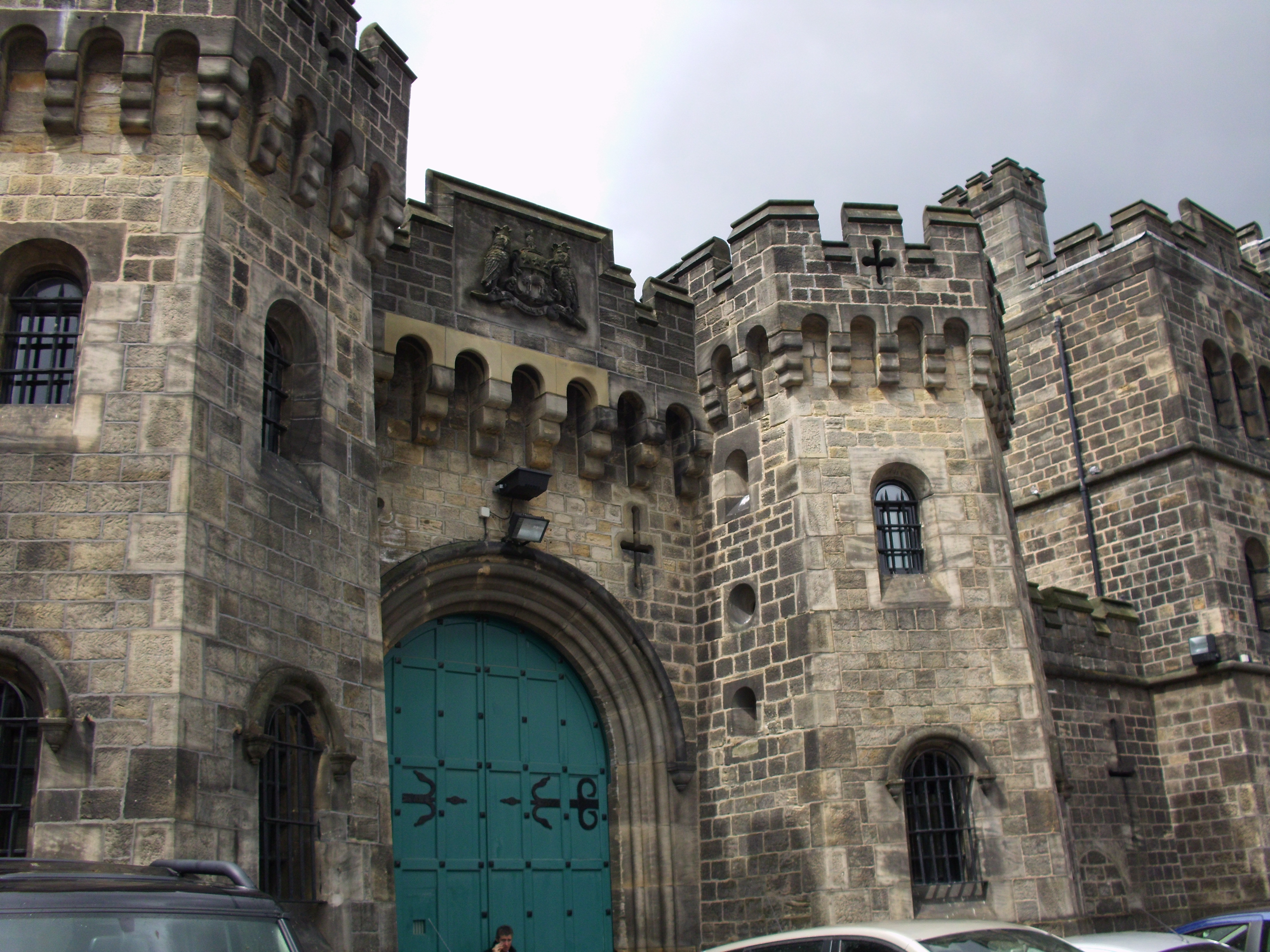
- The original gate to HM Prison Leeds

- Location within Leeds
- Location: Leeds, West Yorkshire; 53°47′44″N 1°34′34″W
- Security class: Adult Male/Category B
- Population: 1,100+ (August 2023)
- Opened: 1847
- Managed by: HM Prison Services
- Governor: Di Lewis
- Website: Leeds at justice.gov.uk

HM Prison Leeds is a Category B men's prison, located at Gloucester Terrace in the Armley area of Leeds in West Yorkshire, England, which opened in 1847. Leeds Prison is operated by His Majesty's Prison Service, and is still known locally as Armley Gaol, the historical name of the prison.

== History ==
Construction of Leeds Prison (originally named Leeds Borough Gaol) was completed in 1847. Built from locally quarried stone, the prison originally had four wings radiating from a central point in a Victorian architectural style (known as 'radial') typical both of the time, and in the latest UK prisons. Each of these four wings had three landings of cells. Eventually Armley Gaol was renamed along with other prisons to make their locations more obvious to people unfamiliar with these areas.

The prison was a site of execution (by hanging) from 1847 until 1961. The final execution was that of Zsiga Pankotai (31) on 29 June 1961, for the murder of 50-year-old Eli "Jack" Myers in a house burglary in the city's Roundhay district. The final execution in A block was that of 19-year-old Walter Sharpe in 1950.

The 'castle style' entrance range of the building and the 200 metres of perimeter wall received a Grade II* heritage listing in 1976.

In 1990, the Howard League for Penal Reform announced that it would conduct its own independent inquiry into the deaths of five teenage prisoners at HMP Leeds. This followed a refusal by the Home Office to hold a public inquiry.

A further two wings were added in 1994, and a new gate complex was opened in September 2002, providing much needed staff facilities and an improvement to the entry point for all visitors and staff. Most of the older parts of the prison have been extensively refurbished since 2003.

=== 21st century ===
In August 2003 a study by the Prison Reform Trust revealed that Leeds prison had the highest level of recorded drug use among prisoners in England and Wales. 28.3% of inmates held at Leeds Prison tested positive for controlled substances.

In April 2004, Shahid Aziz was murdered by his racist cellmate at HMP Leeds, sparking controversy over the similarities of the case with that of Zahid Mubarek.

In July 2005 The Howard League for Penal Reform published statistics showing that Leeds Prison had the second highest suicide rate of all prisons in England and Wales. 25 inmates had committed suicide at the prison between 1995 and 2004.

In 2006 the prison became the first to migrate onto the CNOMIS computer system. This was a large undertaking at great financial impact to the government.

In June 2008 a report by Her Majesty's Chief Inspector of Prisons severely criticised conditions for inmates at Leeds Prison, and accused managers of making up figures relating to how long inmates spent in their cells. In reality some prisoners were out of their cells for just two and a half hours a day. The report also highlighted problems with hostile and unhelpful staff at the prison.

In 2008, Times journalist Robert Crampton used his Beta Male column to ask for invitations to give speeches, to improve his public speaking skills. He received 400 invitations, but only accepted a handful, including Leeds Prison. He visited the prison to give the speech in 2009, subsequently reporting on the experience in The Times.

In June 2010 a further report by Her Majesty's Chief Inspector of Prisons on their unannounced follow-up visit commented that "it is pleasing to report that this unannounced follow-up visit charted further progress in all areas, as a result of close and effective management" and that "there had been a noticeable improvement in staff-prisoner relationships and considerable management attention to aspects of diversity, in particular race". However, the report also claimed that illicit drug use at the prison was high, in-patient and day care facilities as part of the healthcare provision remained inadequate, and the prison lacked enough purposeful activity for inmates, with many prisoners spending too much time in their cells.

In May 2013 a further inspection report found that conditions had generally improved at the prison, including lower drug use amongst prisoners and better healthcare facilities. The report also praised security at the prison and its resettlement wing. However the report highlighted that prisoners still lacked enough purposeful activity, and that vulnerable inmates needed better protection at the prison. The report also found that the quality and quantity of food given to inmates was poor.

Two months later Leeds Prison was the first prison in the country to be awarded a Leaders in Diversity Award from the National Centre for Diversity. The award was given in recognition of the prisons efforts to be inclusive for LGBT staff and inmates, as well as various equality and diversity programmes at the prison for all staff and inmates.

== The prison today ==
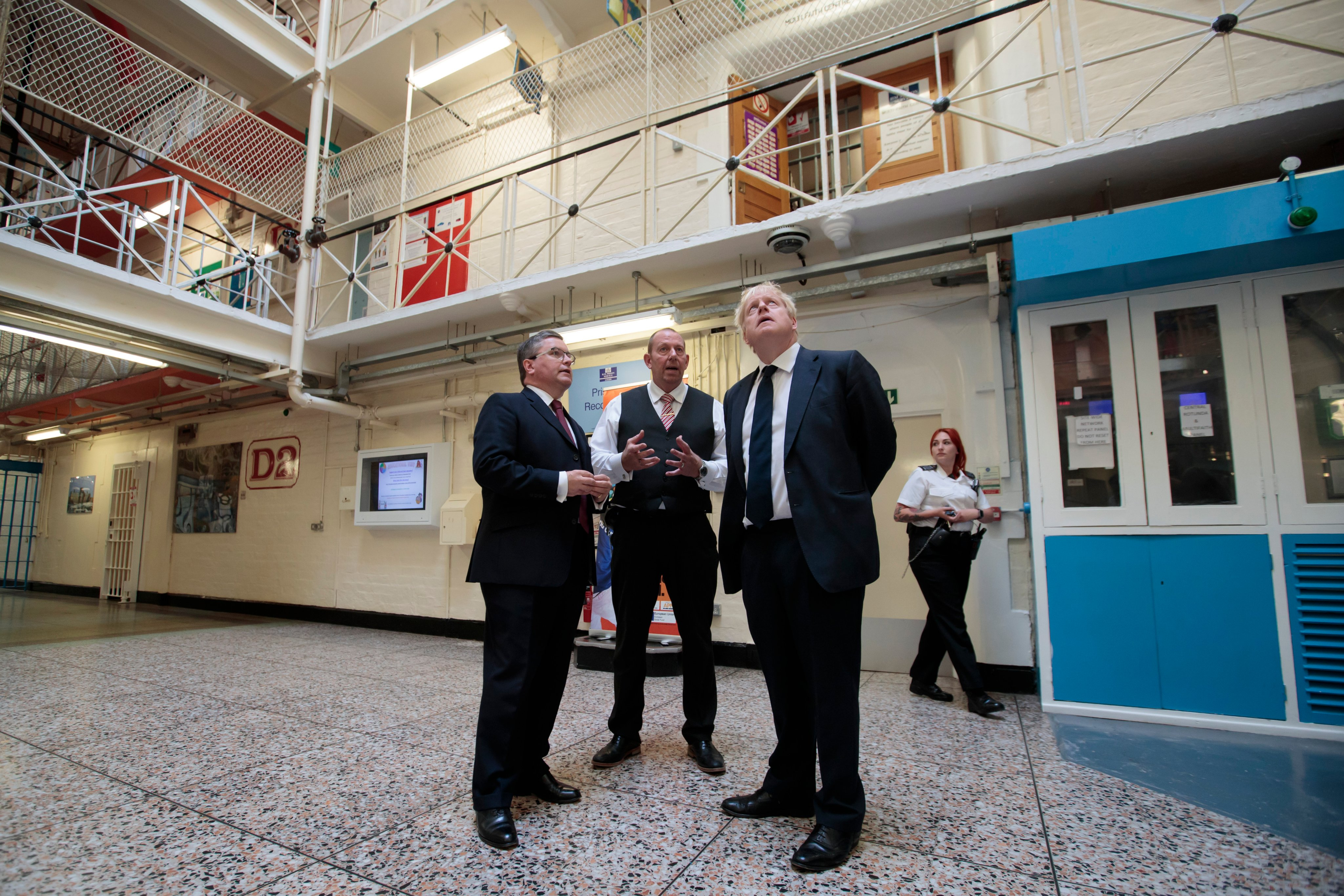
Prime Minister Boris Johnson visiting the prison in August 2019.

HMP Leeds serves magistrates and crown courts in West Yorkshire, and parts of North Yorkshire, South Yorkshire, Lancashire and Greater Manchester.

In addition to serving the courts, the key focus of the prison is to ensure prisoners are discharged, having had their housing needs assessed and where possible settled accommodation and employment arranged. The establishment also focuses on support to prisoners with regards to health and lifestyle, including drug detoxification and prescribing programmes as well as the delivery of the Short Duration Drugs Programme.

The prison can house up to 1212 prisoners in six residential units, a segregation unit, First Night Centre, Vulnerable Prisoner unit and in-patients Healthcare Facility.

As of May 2017, there had been 11 deaths at Leeds Prison since May 2013, making it the second worst in terms of prison fatalities in the country at that time. Woodhill Prison had an even higher number of deaths during the same period. Vikki Thompson, a transgender woman was denied a transfer to a women's prison. She was found dead in the prison.

== Notable inmates ==
=== Current ===
- Vickrum Digwa

=== Former ===
- Charles Bronson (prisoner)
- Roy Chubby Brown
- Mary Fitzpatrick
- Adam Johnson (footballer)
- Stefan Ivan Kiszko
- Lilian Lenton
- David Oluwale
- Charles Peace
- John Poulson
- Paul Russell
- Peter Sutcliffe
- Karen White, rapist who later transitioned, was placed in women's prison and sexually assaulted female inmates

== See also ==
- Listed buildings in Leeds (Armley Ward)
