= St Bartholomew's Church, Armley =

Church of England Church in West Yorkshire, England

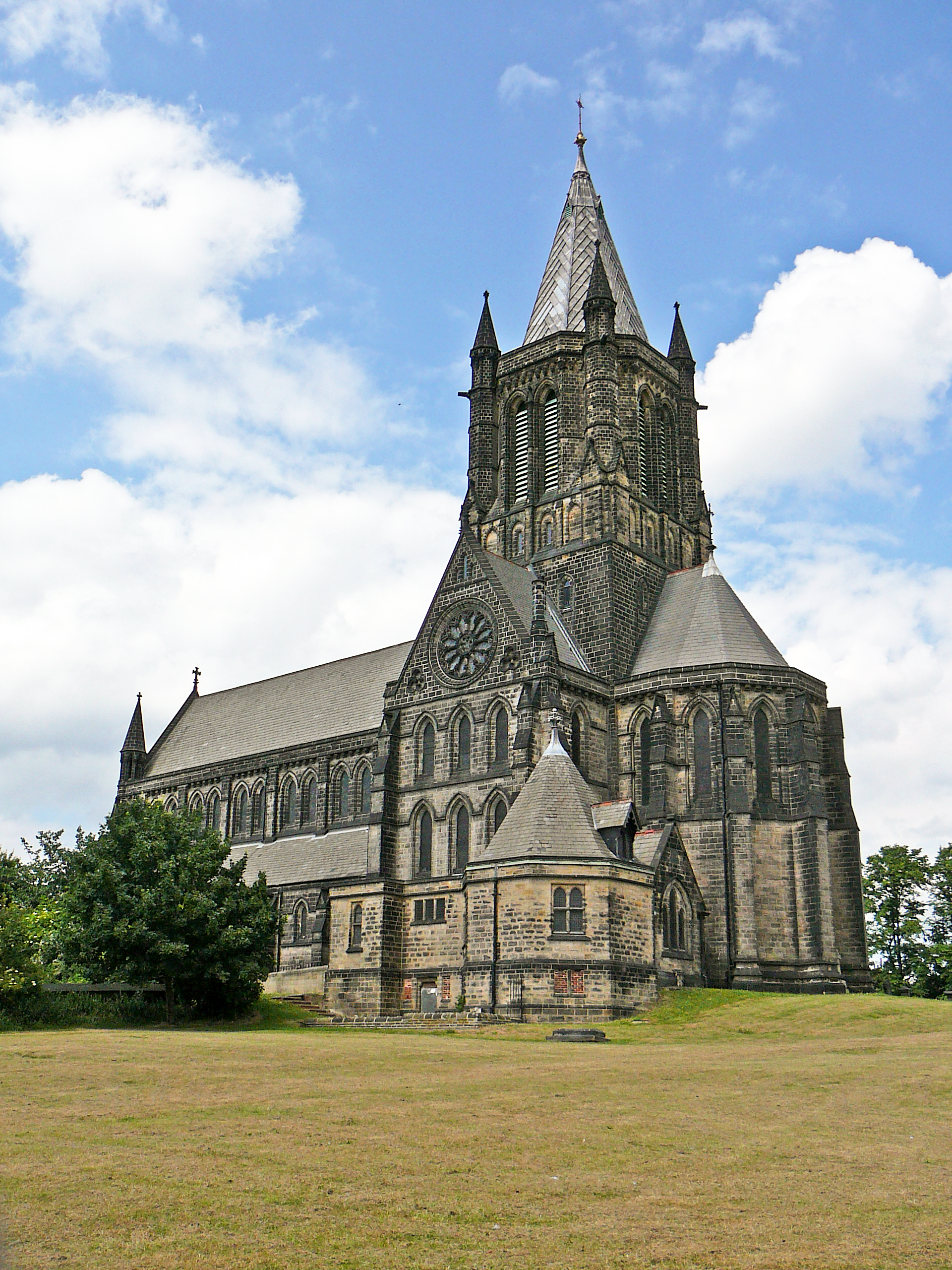
- St Bartholomew's Church, Armley
- 53.79462°N 1.58701°W
- OS grid reference: SE 27301 33209
- Location: Leeds
- Country: England
- Denomination: Church of England
- Churchmanship: Anglo-Catholic
- Website: www.stbartsarmley.org.uk

History
- Dedication: St. Bartholomew
- Consecrated: 1877

Architecture
- Heritage designation: Grade II* listed building
- Architect(s): Henry Walker and Joseph Althron
- Architectural type: Perpendicular Gothic
- Completed: 1872
- Construction cost: £20,000 (£1,960,000 in 2025)

Specifications
- Length: 57 m (187 ft)
- Width: 18 m (59 ft)
- Height: 34 m (112 ft)
- Materials: Horsforth sandstone

Administration
- Province: York
- Diocese: Leeds
- Archdeaconry: Leeds
- Deanery: Armley
- Parish: Armley with New Wortley

St Bartholomew's Church, Armley is a parish church in the Church of England in Armley, West Yorkshire. The church is one of two Church of England churches in Armley; the other being Christ Church. Worship at St Bartholomew's is firmly rooted in the Anglo-Catholic tradition of the Church of England with a solemn mass being celebrated weekly.

== History ==
The first chapel at Armley was built in 1630 but not consecrated by Richard Sterne, Archbishop of York, until 1674. In 1737 it was extended to the north, the roof was raised and a small balcony was added at the west end.

In 1825 the chapel was much enlarged through the benevolence of Benjamin Gott, a local industrial businessman with woollen mills in Leeds.

A new church was built starting in 1872 to designs by the architects Henry Walker and Joseph Althron of Leeds, and is now a Grade II* listed building. It was consecrated in 1877 but the tower was not dedicated until 1904. The church is constructed of Horsforth sandstone. The old chapel was demolished in 1909.

=== List of vicars ===
- George Metcalfe, 1766–91
- Richard Fawcett, 1791–1815
- Thomas Barber, 1815–22
- Charles Clapham, 1822–48
- David Hartley
- Frederick George Hume Smith, 1877–1906
- James Buchanan Seaton 1906–09 (later Bishop of Wakefield, 1928–38)
- Ralph Creed Meredith 1914–17 (later Vicar of St John the Baptist Church, Windsor, 1940–58, and Chaplain to George VI and Elizabeth II, 1946–52)
- Lovell Clarke 1923–33 (previously Vicar of All Saints' Church, Nottingham and subsequently Archdeacon of Leeds)
- William Johnston 1949–56 (later Archdeacon of Bradford and then Bishop of Dunwich)
- Norman Ernest (Norry) McCurry 1963–73
- Owen Conway, 1973–81
- Nicholas Plant, 1982–92
- Timothy Lipscomb, 1992–2005
- Ian Wright, 2006–14
- Michael Wood, 2016–2022

== Features ==
The Caen stone reredos erected in 1877 has alabaster carvings, representing the Magi, crucifixion and Old Testament figures. John Wormald Appleyard was present at the consecration on 24 August 1877, listed alongside the architects Henry Walker and Joseph Athron who designed the building and reredos. Since no other stone carver is credited for this work, it is reasonable to suppose that it could be the work of Appleyard.

The pulpit is of alabaster and marble, designed by architect Thomas Armfield after the pulpit at the shrine of Sebaldus in St. Sebaldus Church, Nuremberg. It was carved originally by Mawer and Ingle for the former St Bartholomew's Church, on the occasion of its 1861 restoration, then moved along with the font and the old tomb memorials to the new building after the consecration.

There is a sculpture by Joseph Gott at the west end of the north aisle, a memorial to Benjamin Gott of Armley House who died in 1839. In the south aisle there is Faith comforting the Mourner, commemorating the two sons of Benjamin and Elizabeth Gott who died in Paris and Athens. Benjamin Gott's son William Gott was interred in the family vault in the former St Bartholomew's Church.

== Organ ==
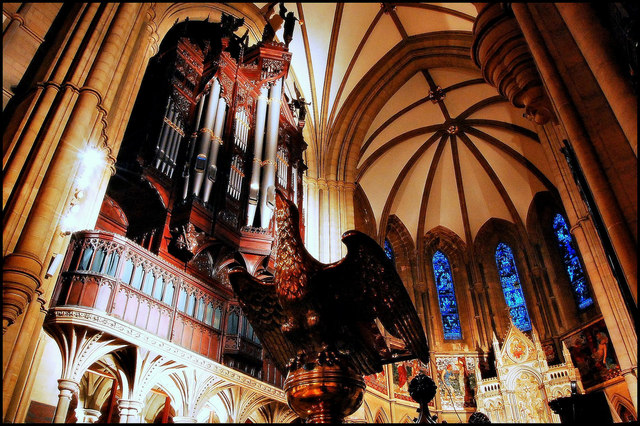
The organ

The church is perhaps best known for its organ. It was built by the German builder Edmund Schulze. It was originally installed in Meanwood Towers in 1869. In 1877 it was inaugurated in St. Peter's Church, Harrogate. Following a dispute with the vicar, the organ was installed in St. Bartholomew's in 1879. It was rebuilt in 1905 by James Jepson Binns and other restoration work took place in 1956 by Hill, Norman and Beard, 1974 by John T. Jackson and Son and 2004 by Harrison & Harrison.

The organ has been awarded a Grade II* listing by the British Institute of Organ Studies for organs which are good representatives of the work of their builder, in substantially original condition.

A specification of the organ can be found on the National Pipe Organ Register.

=== Organists ===
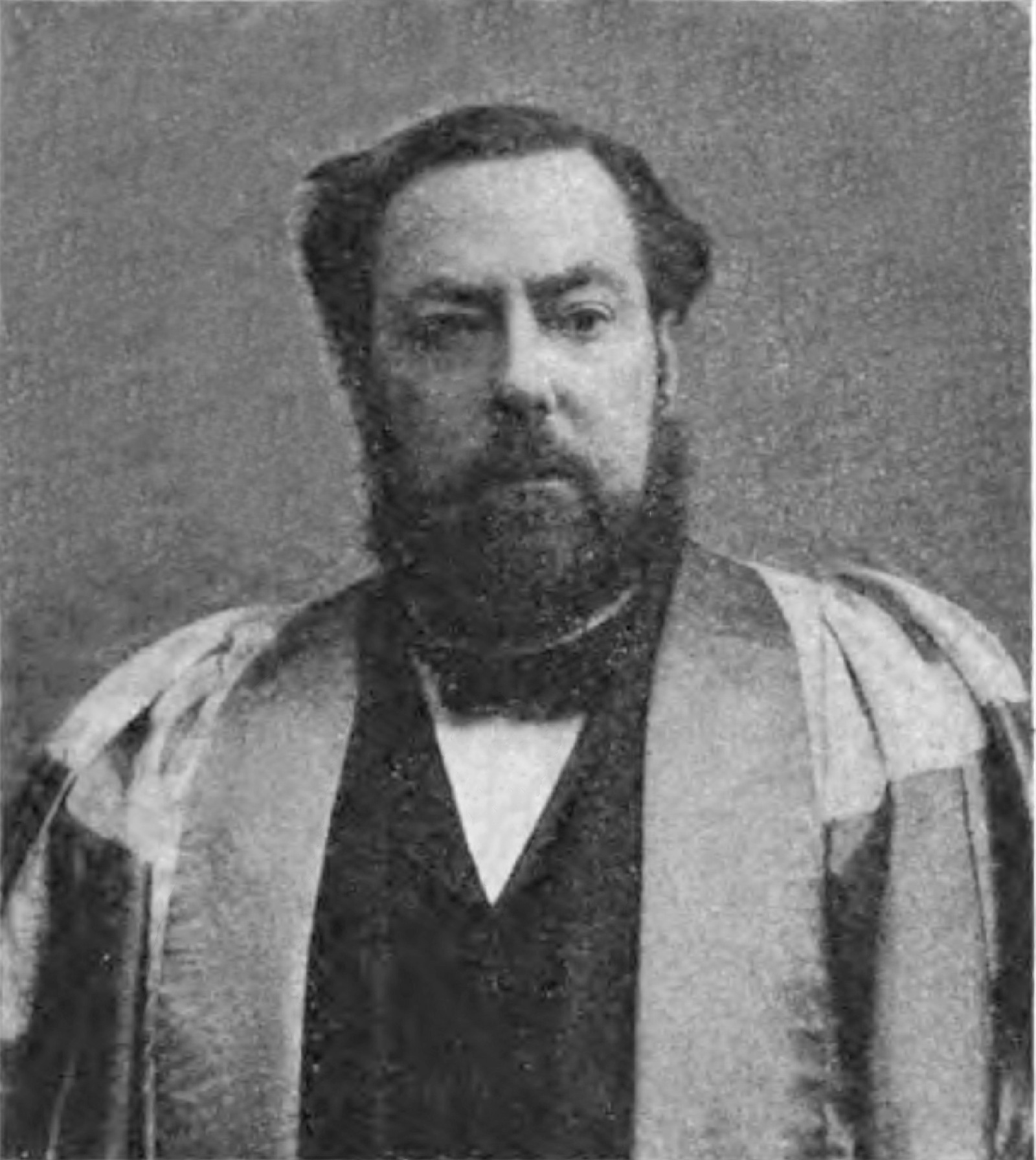
John Varley Roberts

- 1862–1868: John Varley Roberts (afterwards organist of Halifax Parish Church)
- 1878–1921: Thomas Cawthra
- 1921–1924: Thomas E Pearson (afterwards organist of Halifax Parish Church)
- 1924–1937: Herbert Bardgett (afterwards chorusmaster of Nottingham Harmonic Society)
- 1937–1938: John B Dalby (afterwards organist of St Machar's Cathedral Aberdeen)
- 1938–1939: Donald H Martin
- 1939–1940: Eric Whiteside
- 1940–1953: W Iles Pulford
- 1953–1955: Alan A Tranah
- 1955–1962: John J F Watkins
- 1962–1966: John Snow
- 1966–1973: Anthony Norcliffe (later organist of St Chad's Church, Far Headingley and Mill Hill Chapel)
- 1973–1986: Arnold Mahon
- 1986–present: Graham Barber

== See also ==
- Listed buildings in Leeds (Armley Ward)
