= Elizabeth Beecroft =

English iron manufacturer (1748–1812)

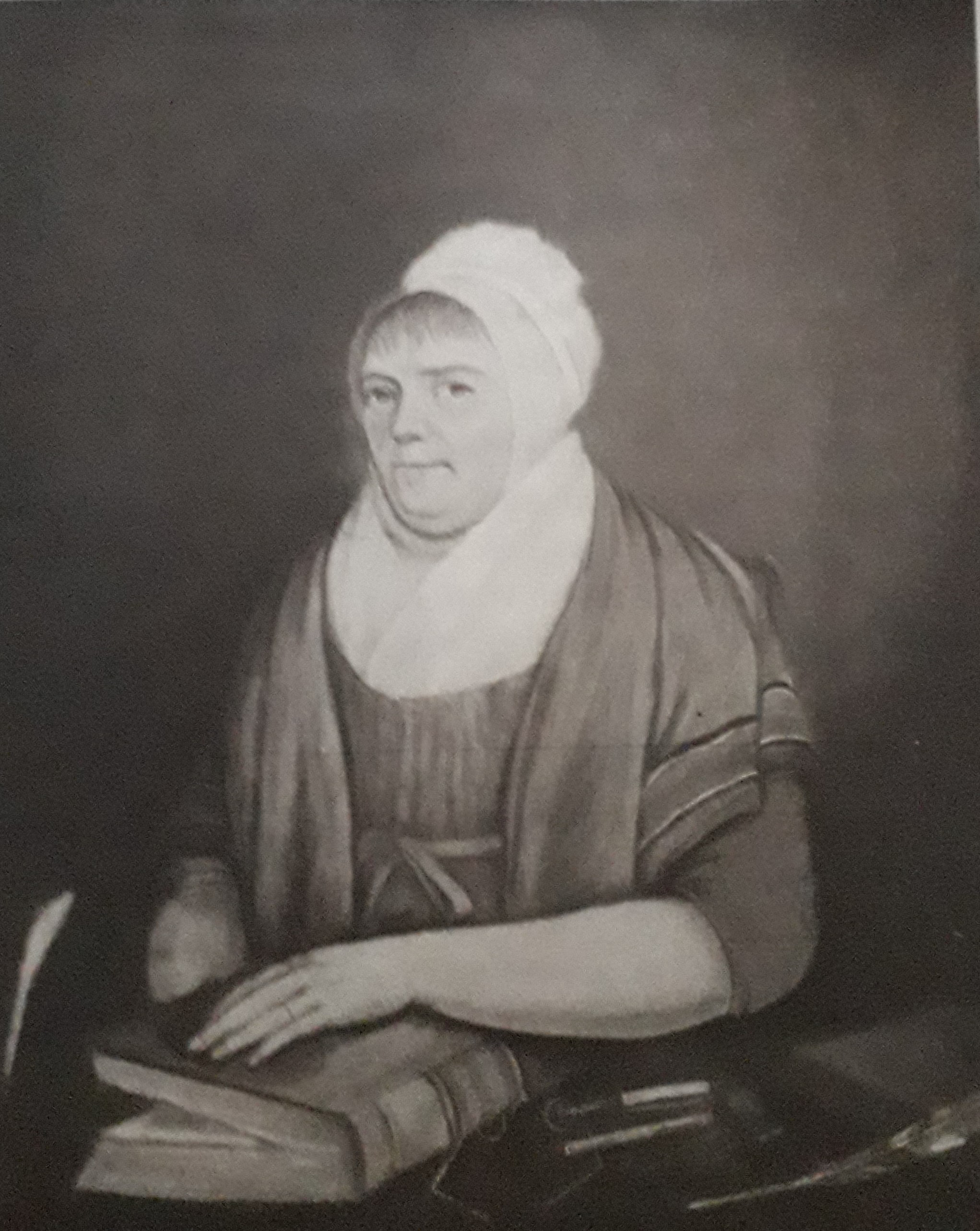
- Born: Elizabeth Skirrow; 1748; Clifton
- Died: 1812 (aged 63–64)
- Occupation: Ironmaster
- Spouse: George Beecroft (m.1775)
- Father: John Skirrow

Elizabeth Beecroft née Skirrow (1748–1812) was an English ironmaster and businessperson. She was a pioneering manager of Kirkstall forge from 1778 to 1785 making and selling iron and ironware.

== Early life ==
Betty was born in 1748 at Clifton, near Otley. Her father, John Skirrow (d. 1776), was a tanner, and her mother had a business selling butter; she was the only daughter of William Walsh of Skipton, a tallow chandler and soap boiler. She was one of eleven children, six of whom survived to adulthood, and was the youngest of seven daughters. Her father was spendthrift, but her mother paid for a basic education for all the children. Betty began trading at 18 years of age, with her brother James, in a shop selling pots, glasses and china, and also selling butter in Leeds market, twice weekly. On 28 March 1775, Betty married the farmer, George Beecroft of Bramley, Leeds. The Beecroft family were supporters of John Wesley. Betty and her husband lived at Kepstorn farm near Kirkstall Forge.

== Manager of the forge ==
In October 1778, Betty suggested to her husband that they took the lease of the forge and the farm lands and mill that went with it. Her husband was nervous about the enterprise, but Betty worked with her mother-in-law, and her brothers-in-law John Butler (1738–1826) of Baildon, who was married to George's sister Jane, and Thomas Butler (1735–1805) of Lichfield, to secure the lease and finance the operation. She had approached her cousin, Mary Dixon of Otley, a wealthy widow, but Mary wanted her son, Edward, to be involved, and Betty thought he would dominate her husband and not share the profits. Thomas Butler contributed £1000 to the venture, and George and Betty managed to raise £800. It was entirely through Betty's courage and ambition that the two families came to run the forge.

While George managed the farm and mill, Betty took care of the account books and the trade of the forge, buying and selling materials such as scrap metal, and employing workers. After the first year, John Butler took a more active role in the management of the forge, visiting once a week to pay the wages and manage orders. Betty's financial management yielded great profits. In 1780, the forge made £172. By 1784, it was making £952. However, Betty and George were not highly paid. In 1785, John Butler had a house for him built at the forge and took over the general management from Betty, who was pleased with this arrangement as she felt burdened by John's management style, but after nine months he asked Betty to return to the account books because of her shrewdness for business. She continued to work in this capacity until 1805, despite her dislike of the Butler brothers who often treated her and George with disdain.

John Wesley took refuge with Betty and George after being chased out of Horsforth by an angry mob; he also slept in John Butler's house.

== Later life ==
Betty managed the farm's wholesale butter business including after she stopped working for the forge, selling butter in Leeds and Otley. In 1793, when England was at war with France, Betty was accused of exporting butter and bacon to France. She published a notice in the Leeds Mercury on 4 May 1793, refuting the accusations and requesting information on the people who were spreading the false rumours, with a reward of 10 guineas.

Betty died in 1812. Mr Robert Wood, a minister, said of her 'She was neither free from defects nor destitute of eccentricities but her industry, economy, firmness of mind and inviolable attachment to the Scriptures, for which she was most proverbial, will doubtless live for ever in the remembrance of her family and friends'.

Her daughter, Anne, married Thomas Butler (the diarist), son of John Butler of Baildon who had taken over the management of the forge.

== Legacy ==
Betty wrote her memoirs, extracts of which are published along with the diary of Thomas Butler and an account of how the Butler family came into the possession of the forge. In her memoirs, Betty recounts several of her family and friend's spiritual experiences with preachers in Leeds, including Dr James Scott. Betty also tells how she received spiritual instruction from the widow Effem Banks, a linen draper and grocer in Leeds, who received many preachers and strangers, and in the words of Betty, 'washed the feet of the saints'.

Betty featured in the exhibition, Leeds to Innovation (26 October 2019 – 26 September 2020), at Leeds Industrial Museum at Armley Mills including in a portrait painted by a local artist Ping Kelly for the exhibition.

Betty's life was celebrated as a central narrative in archipelago arts collective's production of Mother of the Revolution performed at Leeds Industrial Museum (2-12 May 2024). The character of Betty was portrayed by actor Kathryn Hanke.
