= Armley Park =

Park in Leeds, West Yorkshire, England

Coordinates: 53.8011°N 1.5984°W

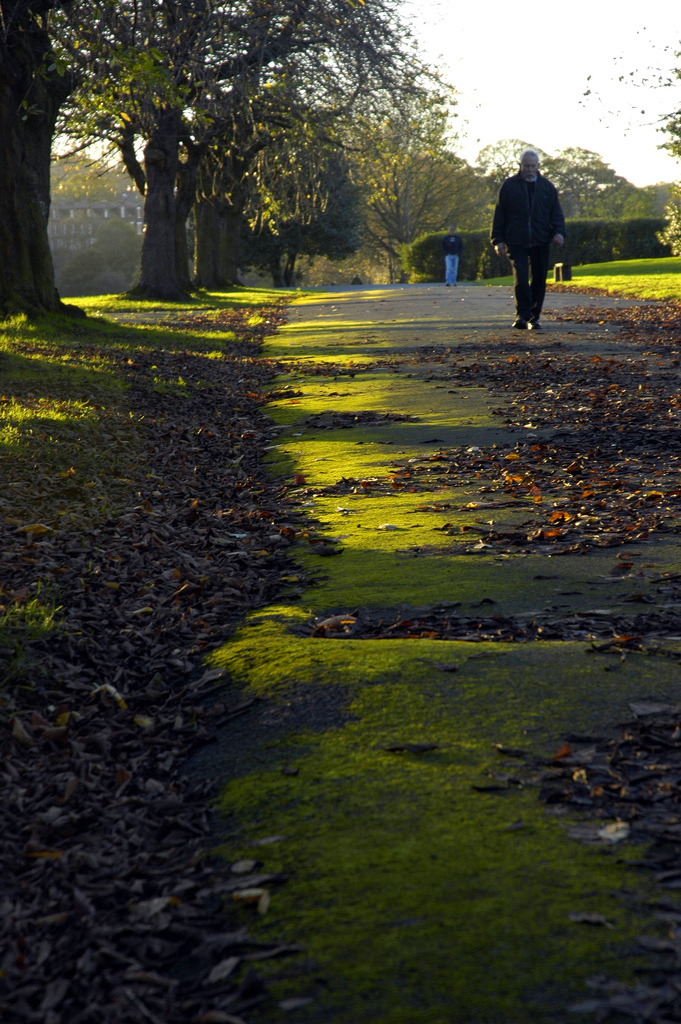
Armley park in autumn

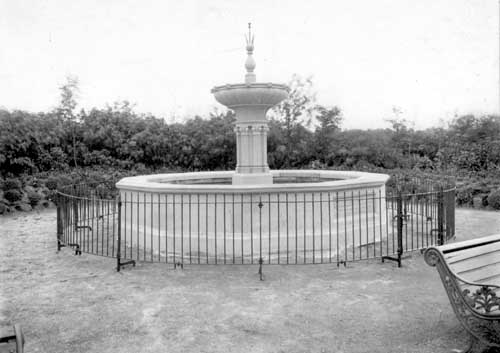
Fountain in 1898

Armley Park is a large (about 14 hectares) public park located next to Stanningley Road in Armley, on the outskirts of Leeds, in West Yorkshire, Northern England.

The park stretches from Armley down the hill to the Leeds and Liverpool Canal, near the canal the park turns to dense woodland.

On its north-west side Armley Park borders Gotts Park, which is designated as a Grade II Park and Garden. It is named after industrialist Benjamin Gott and contains his former home, Gotts Park Mansion, now the clubhouse of Gotts Park Golf Club.

Armley Park has many amenities, including football pitches, tennis courts, bowling greens, a children's playground and gardens. There are also several Grade II listed features including the gate piers at the entrance on Stanningley Road, the war memorial, and the fountain and associated plaques.

Grade II listed features within the parks

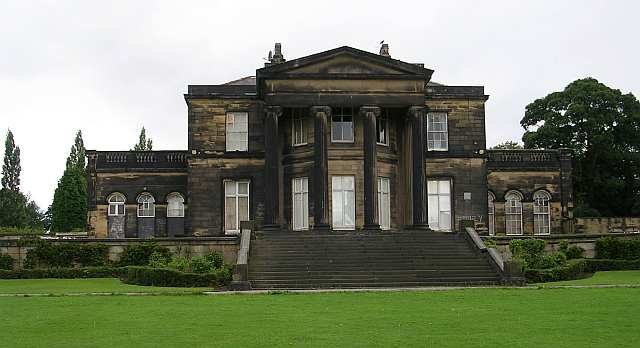
The Mansion was built in 1781 and remodelled for Gott in the 1810s

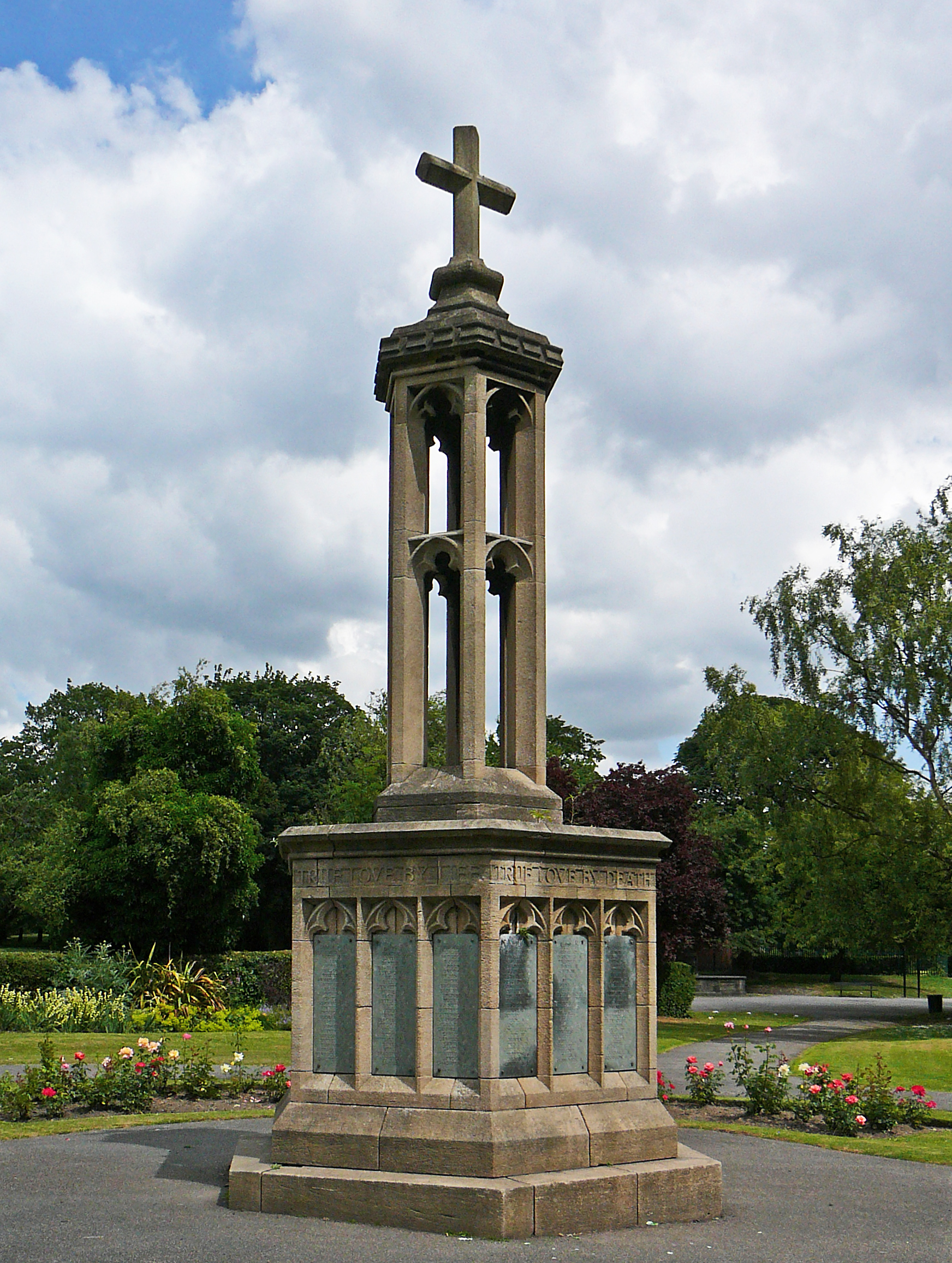
The war memorial was designed c. 1920 by Charles Nicholson

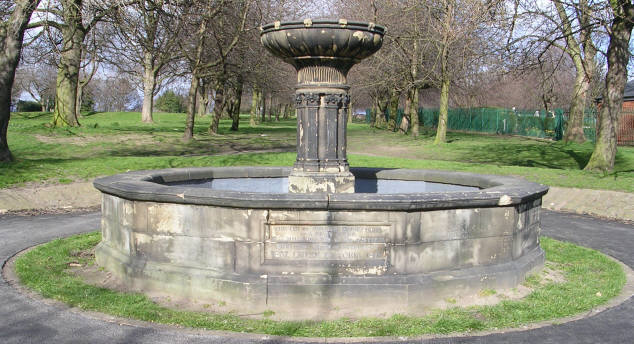
The octagonal fountain is dated 1897

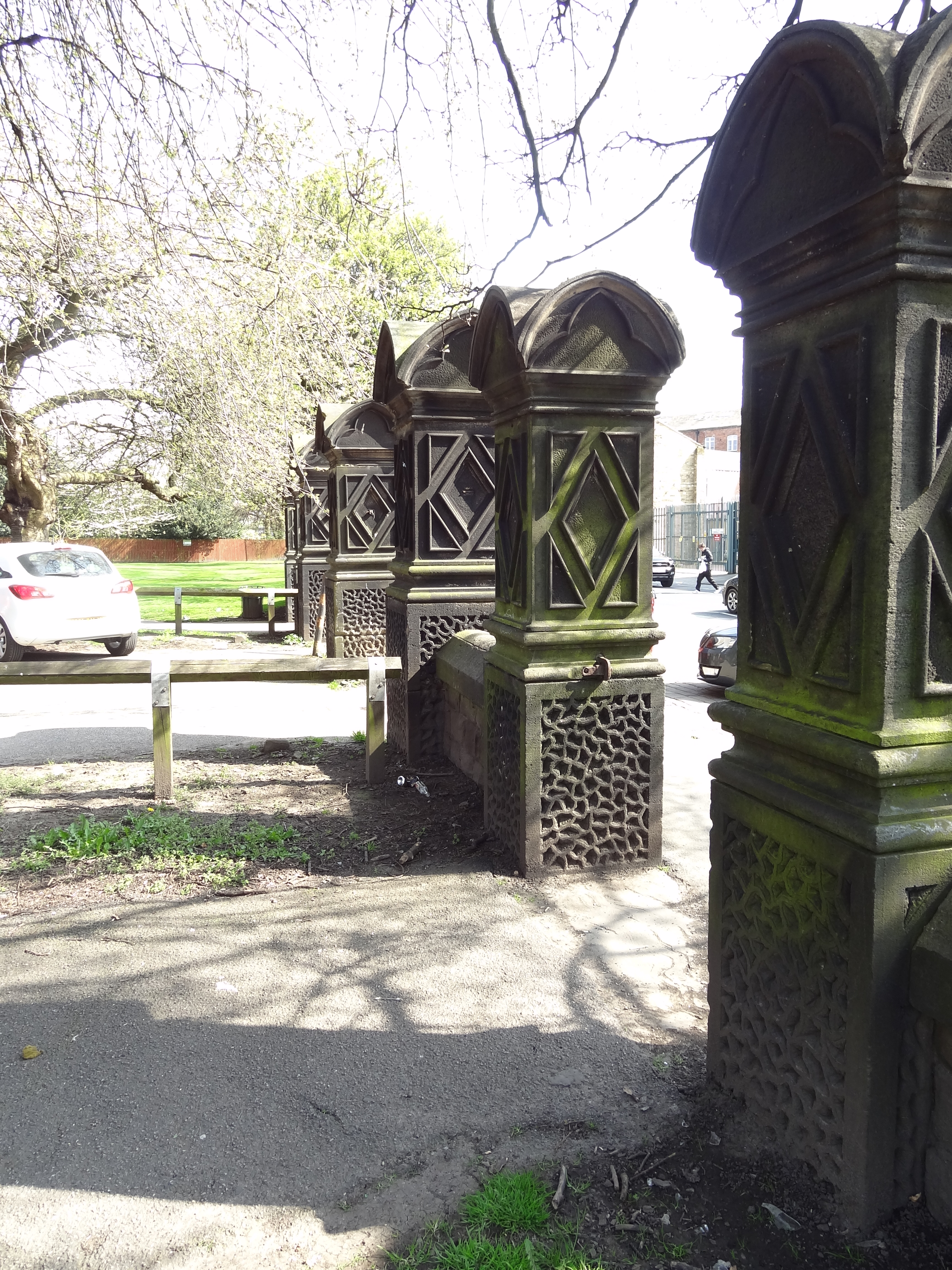
A set of 7 gate piers stand at the Stanningley Road entrance

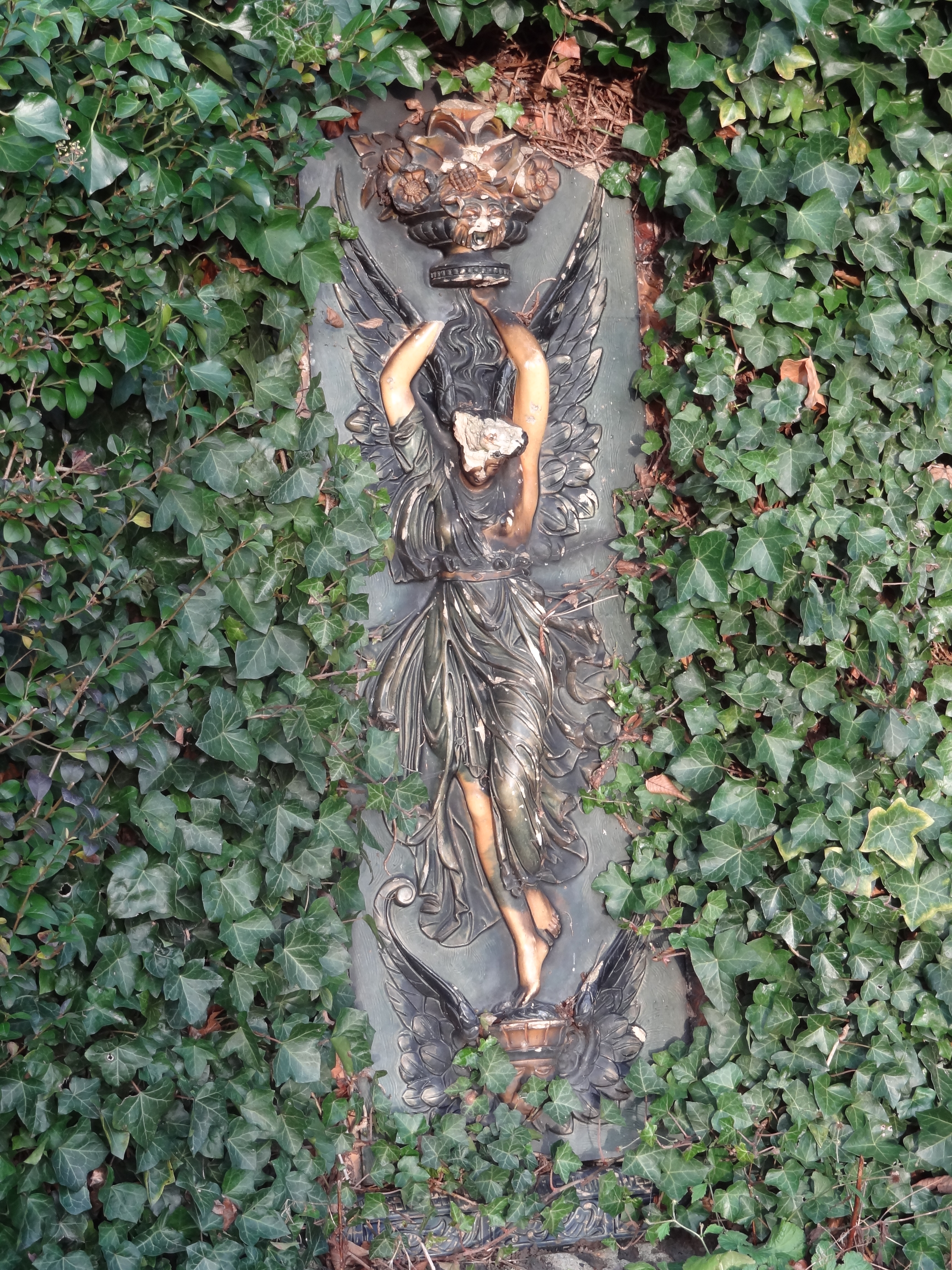
A glazed terracotta plaque approximately 40 metres (130 ft) west of the fountain

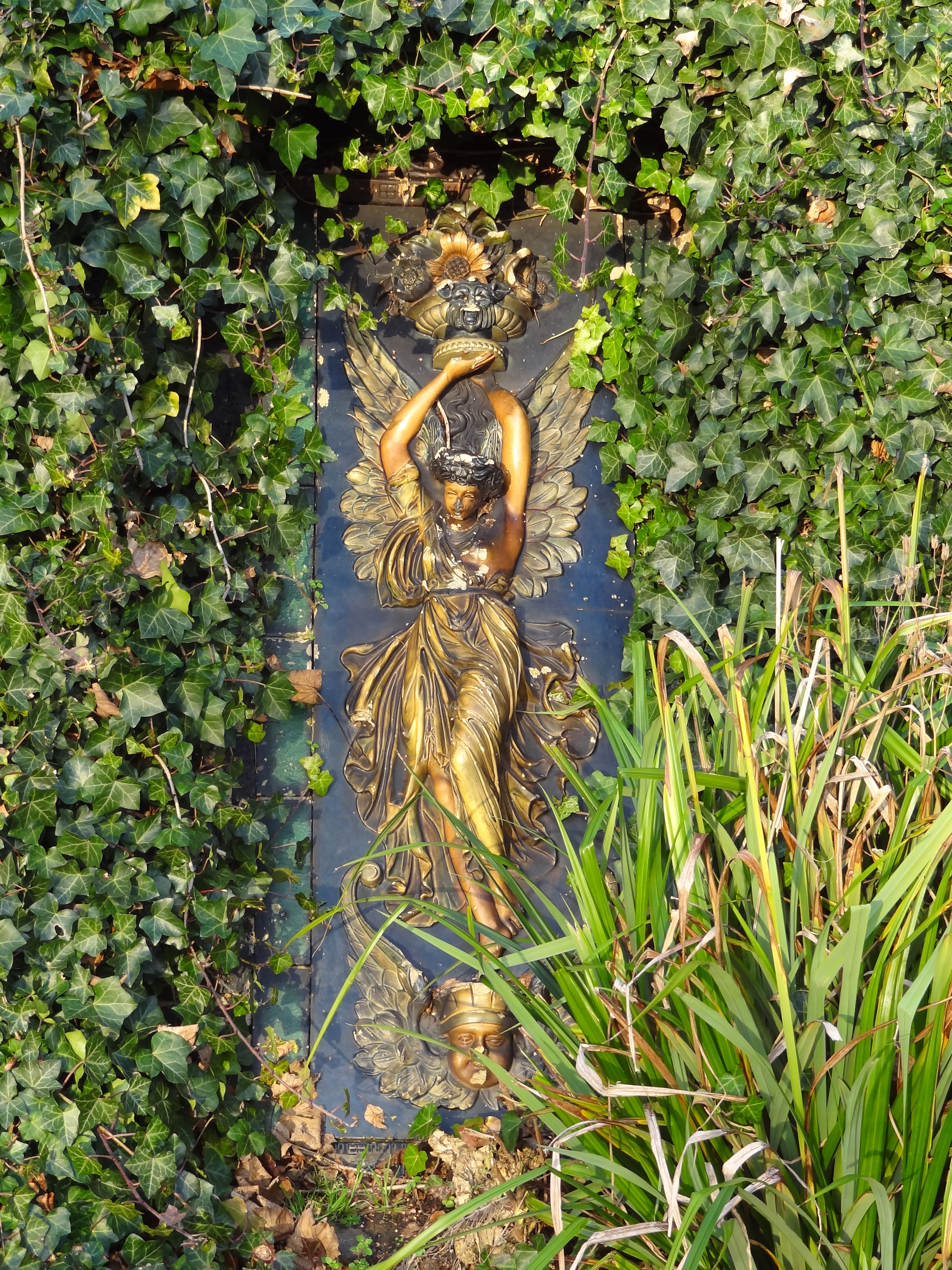
A glazed terracotta plaque approximately 40 metres (130 ft) east of the fountain

== See also ==
- Listed buildings in Leeds (Armley Ward)
