= Listed buildings in Leeds (Armley Ward) =

Armley is a ward in the metropolitan borough of the City of Leeds, West Yorkshire, England. It contains 51 listed buildings that are recorded in the National Heritage List for England. Of these, five are listed at Grade II*, the middle of the three grades, and the others are at Grade II, the lowest grade. The ward contains the former Armley Mills, later the Leeds Industrial Museum at Armley Mills, Armley Prison, Armley Park, and Armley Cemetery, all of which contain listed buildings. The Leeds and Liverpool Canal passes through the ward, and three bridges crossing it are listed. The other listed buildings include a former country house, smaller houses, cottages and associated structures, another former textile mill, a former warehouse and office block, public houses, churches and associated structures, schools, and a public library.

== Key ==
Grade	Criteria
II*	Particularly important buildings of more than special interest
II	Buildings of national importance and special interest

== Buildings ==
Name and location	Photograph	Date	Notes	Grade
Weir, Armley Mills; 53.80321°N 1.58591°W		Medieval (possible)	The weir on the River Aire was enlarged and rebuilt in about 1788, and repaired after bomb damage in 1942. It consists of massive gritstone slabs with repairs in concrete, and is about 140 metres (460 ft) long.	II
112 Lower Town Street; 53.80982°N 1.62576°W		c. 1600	A timber framed house encased in stone, with quoins, and a stone slate roof, the gable end facing the road. There are two storeys, two bays, and a rear outshut. On the front is a doorway with a plain surround and paired windows to the right, and elsewhere are mullioned windows with small-pane sashes.	II
The Cottage; 53.80680°N 1.61496°W	—	1646	A farmhouse that has been extended and divided into three houses, it is in gritstone with quoins, additions in rendered brick and stone, and a stone slate roof, hipped on the right. There are two storeys, the original part with two bays, and the extension higher with two bays. The original doorway has chamfered quoined jambs, and a flat-arched lintel carved with initials and the date. The windows in the original part are mullioned, and in the later part there are sash windows and two full-height canted bay windows.	II
Westville; 53.79959°N 1.60501°W	—	Mid 17th century	The house is in gritstone with a stone slate roof, two storeys and an attic, and three bays. The original entrance has a carved lintel, and to the right is an inserted doorway with a cornice hood on console brackets. Most of the windows have architraves and mullions, there is a small round-headed window in the upper floor, a square attic window in the right gable end, and two round-headed windows in the left gable end.	II
Roscoe Terrace; 53.79654°N 1.59636°W	—	Late 17th century	The house is in gritstone with quoins and a stone slate roof. There are two storeys and two bays. The doorway has a painted stone lintel, to the right is a small circular windows, and the other windows are mullioned. In the upper floor is a weathered datestone, and at the rear are sliding sash windows.	II
The Cottages; 53.80666°N 1.61506°W		Late 17th century	A house later divided into two, it is in stone, with a moulded string course, a concrete tile roof, two storeys and five bays. The main doorway has a moulded surround and a large lintel, and there is another doorway to the right. The windows are mullioned with some mullions removed.	II
Rigg House and Stone Lea; 53.80292°N 1.605665°W	—	Mid 18th century	A house converted and divided into two in the 20th century, it is in rendered stone with quoins, and a stone slate roof with coped gables and shaped kneelers. There are two storeys, five bays, and a recessed two-bay extension on the right. The central doorway has an architrave and a fanlight, and the windows have architraves.	II
1–5 Hollywell Grove; 53.79768°N 1.59617°W		Late 18th century	A group of houses in gritstone with stone slate roofs and two storeys. Nos. 2 and 3 form a pair, and have quoins, a sill band, a moulded eaves cornice, and central doorways with fanlights. The windows are mullioned, with some mullions removed and casements inserted, and at the rear are tall staircase windows. To the left is No. 1, an added bay with a coped gable on the left. To the right, and at right angles, are Nos. 4 and 5, a later pair of houses with small-pane casement windows.	II
Bridge No. 223; 53.81244°N 1.60724°W		Late 18th century	The bridge carries Wyther Lane over the Leeds and Liverpool Canal, and has been widened and partly rebuilt. It is in stone, it consists of a single arch, and has parapets with flat coping. On the southeast side are the remains of a pilaster, and a 20th-century road drainage pipe.	II
Bridge No. 224 (Redcote Canal Bridge); 53.80454°N 1.59619°W		Late 18th century	The bridge carries a private road over the Leeds and Liverpool Canal. It is in stone and consists of a single basket arch. The bridge has chamfered rusticated voussoirs, a band, a triple keystone, and square bollards with flattened pyramidal caps.	II
Bridge No. 225, gate piers and retaining walls 53.80246°N 1.58272°W		Late 18th century	The bridge carries a road over the Leeds and Liverpool Canal into Armley Mills. It is in stone, and consists of a single round arch, with a projecting band and parapets with plain coping. At the south end, the bridge incorporates square gate piers with cornices and shallow pyramidal caps. The retaining wall on the east side is about 15 metres (49 ft) long and 4 metres (13 ft) high, and on the west side it is about 30 metres (98 ft) long, and contains plain gate piers.	II
Malt Shovel Public House; 53.79746°N 1.58823°W		Late 18th century	The public house is in stone with quoins and a stone slate roof. There are two storeys, a symmetrical front of three bays, and a single-bay extension on the left. The central doorway has a fanlight and a cornice on console brackets, and the windows are sashes. In the extension bay is a blocked loading door in the upper floor. At the rear is a bow window with a round-arched window above, and the other windows are mullioned.	II
Weavers' Court; 53.79721°N 1.59869°W	—	Late 18th century	Originally weavers' cottages with a communal loom room above, and later converted into four houses, the stone building has three storeys with paired eaves brackets and a hipped stone slate roof. Towards the right is an elliptical archway with a rusticated surround, a moulded impost, and a keystone. The windows are top-hinged casements, the window above the archway has three lights, and the others have two. The doorways have plain surrounds.	II
The Mansion; 53.80513°N 1.60123°W		c. 1781	A country house later used for other purposes, it was remodelled in about 1817 by Robert Smirke, and was formerly called Armley House. It is in stone with a hipped slate roof, two storeys, three bays, and curving single-storey wings. On the east front is a portico with massive fluted Ionic columns, an entablature with a pediment enclosing a two-storey canted bay window. In the outer bays are sill bands, sash windows and a parapet. The wings contain three round-arched windows, a cornice and a balustrade. In the west front is a single-storey porch with pilasters, bracketed eaves, windows with architraves, an eaves cornice and a blocking course. The outer wings each contains a doorway and a window, both round-headed.	II
Sluice gates and retaining walls, Armley Mills; 53.80293°N 1.58446°W		1788 (or c. 1805)	There are four sluices in cast and wrought iron, access being provided by a stone wall with a low rail. The retaining wall on the north side is about 30 metres (98 ft) long, and links to the weir, and on the south side it is about 20 metres (66 ft) long.	II
Pair of houses and warehouse, Armley Mills; 53.80258°N 1.58226°W		By 1793	The houses and the warehouse, which was added in the 19th century, are in stone. The houses are a mirror-image pair, with a hipped stone slate roof, two storeys and two bays, and a lower two-storey two-bay service range on the right. They contain doorways with plain surrounds and fanlights, mullioned windows, and at the rear are round-headed stair windows. The warehouse on the left has a corrugated asbestos roof, two storeys and nine bays, a doorway with a plain surround and central-pivoting windows.	II
Main block, Armley Mills; 53.80293°N 1.58302°W		1797	The mills started as a corn mill, it later became a textile mill when a larger range was added in 1805, and the building has been converted into a museum. It is in stone with a moulded cornice and blocking course, and a hipped slate roof. There is an L-shaped plan, the larger range with four storeys and 23 bays, and the earlier range at right angles with two storeys and six bays. On the north side of the wing is a shed containing a waterwheel and a wheel pit, and on the north end of the main range is a single-storey engine house. The main range straddles the mill race.	II*
Drying house range and engine shed, Armley Mills; 53.80320°N 1.58237°W		1809	The range and the engine house added to the east end of the north side are in stone and have roofs of slate and stone slate. The range has two storeys and 18 bays with a taller four-bay range at the east end. It contains windows and doorways, and there are four protruding cast iron roof truss supports near the centre.	II
Winker Green Mill, reservoir dams and walls 53.79876°N 1.59169°W		1825–50	The former textile mill is in stone and brick with slate roofs. The four remaining buildings consist of an entrance block with three storeys and eleven bays, the main mill range with four storeys, 19 bays and six bays added later, and an attached two-storey engine house and chimney, a south workshop with four storeys and ten bays, and a later weaving shed at the north. There are also four reservoir dams with linking walls.	II
151, 151A and 151B Town Street; 53.79703°N 1.59854°W		Early 19th century	A row of three houses in stone with a parapet, slate roofs, and two storeys. Nos. 151 and 151A form a pair, both have three bays, and in the outer bay is a canted bay window with round-headed lights, pilasters, and a cornice. In the middle bay is a doorway with a semicircular fanlight, pilasters, and a cornice on console brackets. No. 151B to the left has two bays and a doorway with a rectangular fanlight. The windows in all parts are top-hung casements.	II
Armley Grange; 53.80196°N 1.60837°W		Early 19th century	A large house later used for other purposes, it is in stone with a band, a cornice, a parapet, and a hipped slate roof. There are two storeys and seven bays, the middle three bays projecting. The central doorway has two Tuscan columns and a cornice on console brackets. This is flanked by French windows, and the other windows are sashes with architraves.	II
North range, Armley Mills; 53.80309°N 1.58242°W		Early 19th century	The mill building is against the north edge of the mill tail race. It is in stone with a stone slate roof, and has a single storey, eight bays on the south side, and five on the north side. The central panes of the windows are pivoted.	II
6 and 8 Canal Road; 53.79913°N 1.58447°W	—	1834–47	A pair of stone cottages with a tile roof, three storeys and two bays. The doorways and windows have plain surrounds.	II
Entrance range and walls, Armley Prison; 53.79568°N 1.57558°W		1843–47	The entrance range and walls are in stone. The entrance range has a brick internal skin and a rubble infill, quoins, and slate roofs. In the centre is a large entrance with a moulded round arch, flanked by two-storey towers with corbelled parapets. These are linked by walls to three-storey towers and taller octagonal towers. All the towers and these walls are embattled. The perimeter wall is about 6 metres (20 ft) high and 200 metres (660 ft) long with buttresses and circular corner turrets.	II*
Inner range, Armley Prison; 53.79557°N 1.57626°W	—	1843–47	The inner buildings are in stone and have a brick internal skin and a rubble infill, quoins, and slate roofs. Opposite the entrance is a two-storey block containing a round window, a clock, and lancet windows. To the west is a block with a chapel in the upper floor, and beyond that a semicircular tower with a rectangular turret that has a corbelled embattled parapet. From the central well are four radiating four-storey wings with embattled parapets, and square corner turrets. In the end wall of each wing is a three-storey canted bay window, and over the centre of each wing is an octagonal ventilation tower.	II*
Revetment wall, Armley Prison; 53.79605°N 1.57549°W	—	1843–47	The wall opposite the entrance range is in stone with coping. It extends for about 150 metres (490 ft) and is about 4 metres (13 ft) high, but was originally higher. The wall contains octagonal bollards with large moulded flat capstones, an embattled parapet, and sloping buttresses, and there is a blocked chamfered archway to the right of the centre.	II*
Bridge over head race, Armley Mills; 53.80292°N 1.58427°W		c. 1850 (probable)	The bridge over the mill race is in stone with cast iron railings. It consists of a single segmental arch, with rusticated voussoirs, a band, square bollards with pyramidal caps, and parapet railings. Retaining walls link the bridge to the sluice gates.	II
Chimney stack, Armley Mills; 53.80299°N 1.58206°W		1854	The chimney stack is in stone with a brick top. It has a pedestal with panelled sides and a cornice, and a tapering stack with a moulded base.	II
Christ Church; 53.79923°N 1.59815°W		1869–72	The church is in gritstone with slate roofs, and is in Early English style. It consists of a nave with a clerestory, north and south aisles, a south porch, a chancel with a south vestry, and a west tower. The tower has buttresses, clock faces, and a plain parapet. The east window has three lancets, and in the gable is an oval window.	II
Walls, railings, gate piers and gates, Christ Church; 53.79910°N 1.59870°W	—	c. 1870	The wall with railings encloses the churchyard. The wall is in gritstone, and extends for about 120 metres (390 ft), and the railings are in cast iron. Each of the gate piers has a square plinth, an octagonal shaft, and moulded and pointed capstones, and the gates have elaborate interlaced bars with ball finials.	II
The Towers; 53.79956°N 1.60572°W		c. 1870	A row of three houses in gritstone, with a balustraded eaves parapet, and slate roofs. Each house has two storeys, a basement and attic, and three bays, the middle bay projecting and containing a doorway with a fanlight and a hood on consoles. Above the doorway of No. 21, on the right, is a sash window in an architrave, over which is a round-headed window, eaves brackets, and a steeply pitched tower with an ornate cast iron finial. In the outer bays are bay windows in the ground floor and two-light mullioned windows above. The other houses are mirror-image houses, with an oriel window above the doorway, and over that a round-headed window, and a shaped gable with an urn finial. The other bays contain bay windows and mullioned windows. Behind the central bay is a tapering tower containing round-arched windows, and with elaborate cast iron cresting. In front of the houses are terrace walls with statues of lions.	II
Gate piers and walls, The Towers; 53.79826°N 1.60587°W	—	c. 1870	The gate piers flanking the entrance to the drive leading to the houses are in gritstone. Each pier has a square plinth, carved panels with roundels, and pyramidal capstones. On each side are walls about 5 metres (16 ft) long, with flat coping, ending in pilasters with pyramidal capstones.	II
St Bartholomew's Church; 53.79455°N 1.58716°W		1872–78	The church, which was completed later, is in sandstone with a slate roof, and is in Early English style. It has a cruciform plan consisting of a nave with a clerestory, north and south aisles, north and south porches, north and south transepts, a chancel with a polygonal apse, and a tower at the crossing. The tower has an octagonal bell stage with pinnacles and a short octagonal spire. Most of the windows are lancets and in the transepts are rose windows.	II*
Boundary wall and lych gate, St Bartholomew's Church; 53.79446°N 1.58764°W		1872	The boundary wall and the lych gate, which dates from 1888, are in stone. The wall has chamfered coping, and contains gabled gate piers. The lych gate contains an arch, and has a coped gable and a cross finial.	II
Gate piers, Armley Park; 53.79950°N 1.59246°W		Late 19th century	There are seven stone gate piers at the entrance to the park, the middle three taller. They have a square plan, and each has vermiculated rustication on the plinth, lozenge and floriate cross motifs above, a moulded cornice, cusped arches to the capstone, and a Leeds coat of arms on the front facing the road.	II
Plaque east of fountain, Armley Park; 53.79986°N 1.59177°W		Late 19th century	The plaque is in coloured glazed terracotta in a surround of artificial stone and is incorporated in a hedge. It is about 1 metre (3 ft 3 in) long, and depicts a female figure holding a vase with a mask and flowers in high relief, and is surrounded by birds and fruit in low relief.	II
Plaque west of fountain, Armley Park; 53.80010°N 1.59285°W		Late 19th century	The plaque is in coloured glazed terracotta in a surround of artificial stone and is incorporated in a hedge. It is about 1 metre (3 ft 3 in) long, and depicts a female figure holding a vase with a mask and flowers in high relief, and is surrounded by birds and fruit in low relief.	II
Tower Court; 53.79923°N 1.58402°W		1878	A school, later used for other purposes, it is in red brick with stone dressings, quoins that are rusticated in the ground floor, moulded bands, and a slate roof with coped gables. There are two storeys, a front of 13 bays, and sides of three bays. The outer bays are wider and project under pediments containing oculi. In the ground floor are entrances with Venetian surrounds, the entrance in the right bay converted into a window. The central bay also projects, and rises to a three-storey clock tower with finials and a cupola. In the ground floor is an entrance with flanking columns. The windows in the ground floor have round heads with keystones, and in the upper floor they are flat-headed with architraves, and between them are pilasters with Corinthian capitals.	II
Gate piers and railings, Tower Court; 53.79901°N 1.58388°W	—	1878	Along the forecourt of the building is a low brick wall with stone coping and wrought iron railings. The gate piers are in stone and about 2 metres (6 ft 7 in) high. Each pier has a plinth, and a banded shaft, and the central piers have a capstone with a moulded cornice.	II
Lodge, Armley Cemetery; 53.80227°N 1.61283°W		1886	The cemetery lodge is in gritstone with a slate roof, and was designed by J. P. Pritchett in Gothic Revival style. There are two storeys and a south front of five bays. On the front facing the road is a gabled porch, to the right is a canted bay window, and above it is a two-light window. The windows have cusped lights.	II
Front wall and gate piers, Armley Cemetery; 53.80208°N 1.61238°W	—	1886	The wall and gate piers are in gritstone, and the gates are in iron. The wall extends along the front of the cemetery grounds for about 100 metres (330 ft), and has chamfered coping. The piers have a square section, each is about 2.5 metres (8 ft 2 in) high, and has a chamfered plinth and shaft, cornice brackets, and stepped pyramidal capstones with small trefoil-panelled finials. The piers flank the entrances, and are placed at intervals along the walls.	II
Mortuary Chapel, Armley Cemetery; 53.80197°N 1.61375°W		1886	The chapel was designed by J. P. Pritchett in Gothic Revival style. It is in stone with a slate roof, and consists of a nave with a canted apse to the east, a southeast gabled porch, and a west steeple. The steeple has a tower with two stages, an octagonal open belfry stage with ogee-headed openings, crocketed pinnacles, and a polygonal spire. On the west front is a doorway with a pointed arch, and the windows are lancets.	II
Fountain, Armley Park; 53.80010°N 1.59223°W		1897	The fountain was erected to celebrate the Diamond Jubilee of Queen Victoria. It is in stone and consists of an octagonal pool that has a retaining wall with a moulded base and coping, and an inscribed plate. The central fountain is octagonal and has fluted pilasters, a reeded stem, and a gadrooned bowl with lions' heads on the rim.	II
Former warehouse of the Scotch Foundry; 53.80124°N 1.58031°W		1897	The former warehouse is in red brick on a plinth, with buff sandstone dressings, pilasters, floor bands, a cornice, a parapet with decorative cresting and ball finials, and slate roofs. There are three storeys and a C-shaped plan, with a main front range and receding rear wings. The front range has five wide bays, the middle and outer bays with ornate shaped pedimented gables and kneelers. Most of the windows are flat-headed, in the top floor of the middle bay are two round-arched windows, and the top floor of the outer bays contain Venetian windows.	II
Armley Park Court; 53.79883°N 1.58873°W		1900	A school, later used for other purposes, it is in red brick, and has a slate roof with Dutch gables and obelisk finials. There are two storeys, a basement and attics, and it consists of a hall range and cross-wings, with a symmetrical front of seven bays. The second and sixth bays project and each contains a wide doorway with a segmental arch, a fanlight, a keystone carved with initials, and a segmental cornice on console brackets. Above this are paired windows, a ventilator tower with pilasters, and a lead-covered dome with a finial.	II
Armley Public Library; 53.79719°N 1.58843°W		1901	The library is on a corner site, and is in red brick with stone dressings and a slate roof. On the corner is a curved entrance loggia with an arcade of three arches with carved spandrels and an inscribed frieze, behind which are steps. Further behind, is a tower with quoins, a stage with clock faces in diagonally set panels, and a bellcote with Ionic pilasters and an ogee-shaped lead-clad dome with a finial. On each front is a Dutch gable with a shaped pediment containing a datestone and a coat of arms. The left front has five further bays with Ionic pilasters, and an entablature with a modillion cornice.	II
Former Methodist Church and railings 53.79813°N 1.58742°W		1905	A former Methodist church and Sunday school on a corner site, it is in red brick and terracotta, with two storeys and a T-shaped plan, the Sunday school across the rear. The entrance on the corner is by a flat-roofed projecting porch with fluted columns, and a moulded surround, flanked by windows in architraves, and above is an eaves cornice and a blocking course. Over this is a gable containing an elaborate Venetian window with fluted columns and a moulded architrave, and on the apex is an elaborate dated panel with an obelisk finial. The gable is flanked by pilasters surmounted by domed ventilation turrets. Along the sides are windows with keystones, those in the ground floor tall and round-headed. Enclosing the forecourt is a low brick wall with railings and square gate piers.	II
West Leeds High School; 53.79729°N 1.60440°W		1906–07	The school is in stone and brick with slate roofs, and a double-pile plan. There are 26 bays, the centre block with three storeys and basements, and flanking two-storey wings. The basement and ground floor are rusticated with pilasters, the middle floor has attached Ionic columns, and above are dentilled cornices. In the ground floor of the middle section are Venetian windows. On the central block and on each of the wings is a cupola with colonnettes, an ogee roof and finials; the central cupola has a weathervane.	II
War Memorial, Armley Park; 53.79990°N 1.59300°W		c. 1920	The war memorial is in stone and in the form of a wayside cross. It has a six-sided plinth on which is a two-stage open-sided shaft surmounted by a cross. In each side of the plinth are three niches with cusped heads inscribed with the names of those lost in the First World War, and on the border above is an inscription.	II
The Beech Public House; 53.79089°N 1.57457°W		1931	The public house and hotel is in red brick, with cladding and detailing in white and green artificial marble, and is in Art Deco style. There are two storeys and a front of three bays, with chamfered corners, and a parapet stepped over the middle bay. The central bay projects slightly, it contains a doorway with a stepped architrave and pilasters and a fanlight, above which are paired windows. The outer bays contain windows, those in the ground floor with green cladding below and white cladding above containing the name of the hotel in relief.	II
Former office block of the Scotch Foundry; 53.80120°N 1.58078°W		1932	The former office block is in Art Deco style. Its entrance front faces north, and is in artificial stone on a stone plinth, with a rusticated ground floor, a floor band, and a parapet with a shallow central pediment. There are three storeys and three bays, the outer bays projecting slightly with a ribbed architrave and paterae, and they contain a single window in each floor. The middle bay has a doorway with a moulded surround, and three windows in each floor above. The west front is long, in two linked sections, and is in red brick with artificial stone dressings and a tall parapet.	II
