= Listed buildings in Newall with Clifton =

Newall with Clifton is a civil parish in the county of North Yorkshire, England. It contains seven listed buildings that are recorded in the National Heritage List for England. All the listed buildings are designated at Grade II, the lowest of the three grades, which is applied to "buildings of national importance and special interest". The parish contains the village of Clifton and the surrounding area. All the listed buildings are in the village, and they consist of houses, cottages, farmhouses and a barn.

== Buildings ==
Name and location	Photograph	Date	Notes
Grange Farmhouse and Fairfax Cottage; 53.92950°N 1.70804°W		1604	A house and cottage in gritstone, with quoins, and a stone slate roof with gable coping and shaped kneelers, and two storeys. The house to the left is dated 1728, and has two bays. The doorway has an eared architrave, a cornice, and a dated and initialled keystone, and the windows are mullioned. The cottage, dated 1604, is lower and has two bays. The doorway on the left has a moulded surround, and a hood mould with a dated and initialled plaque. The windows are mullioned, the ground floor window with a hood mould.
Sundial Farmhouse; 53.92846°N 1.70822°W	—	1637	The house is in gritstone, with quoins, and a stone slate roof with gable copings, and a shaped kneeler on the right. On the left kneeler is a large squarer sundial. There are two storeys and four bays. The doorway has quoined jambs with moulded edges, and throughout there are recessed chamfered mullioned windows.
Well Farmhouse and barn 53.92903°N 1.70841°W	—	1641	The house and barn to the left are in gritstone, with quoins, and a stone slate roof. The house has two storeys and two bays. The doorway has chamfered quoined jambs and a triangular head, above which is an initialled and dated stone plaque, and the windows are mullioned. The barn is dated 1874, it has three bays, and contains a central cart entrance with a cambered arch, converted into a window, with an initialled and dated keystone, and above is a pitching hole.
Old Hall Farmhouse; 53.92936°N 1.70818°W		1647	A house that was extended in 1658, in gritstone, with stone slate roof, shaped kneelers, gable coping and pyramidal finials. The original house has two storeys, two bays and a rear outshut. The doorway on the left has moulded and quoined jambs, a date plaque, and a hood mould. Throughout there are recessed chamfered mullioned windows. To the left is a wide cross-wing with two storeys and an attic. It contains a six-light mullioned window with a hood mould in each floor, and in the attic is an oval window with a hood mould on shallow consoles.
Clifton Cottage and Ash Tree Cottage; 53.92975°N 1.70788°W	—	17th century	Two houses in gritstone, with quoins, and a stone slate roof with gable coping and shaped kneelers. There are two storeys and two bays. Each cottage has a doorway, there are paired sash windows in the right cottage, and the other windows are mullioned.
Cherry Tree Farmhouse; 53.92886°N 1.70794°W	—	1717	The house is in gritstone, with quoins, and a stone slate roof with gable coping, a bulbous kneeler on the left and a restored kneeler on the right. There are two storeys and four bays. The doorway to the right has a moulded quoined surround, and a dated and initialled ogee doorhead. Throughout there are recessed chamfered mullion windows.
Sunnyview Farmhouse; 53.92841°N 1.70709°W	—	Early to mid 18th century	The house is in gritstone, with quoins, and a stone slate roof with gable copings and shaped kneelers. There are two storeys and two bays. The central doorway has a chamfered quoined surround and a shaped lintel, and the windows are mullioned.
