= Leeds Industrial Museum at Armley Mills =

Museum in Leeds, West Yorkshire, England

Coordinates: 53°48′2″N 1°34′57″W

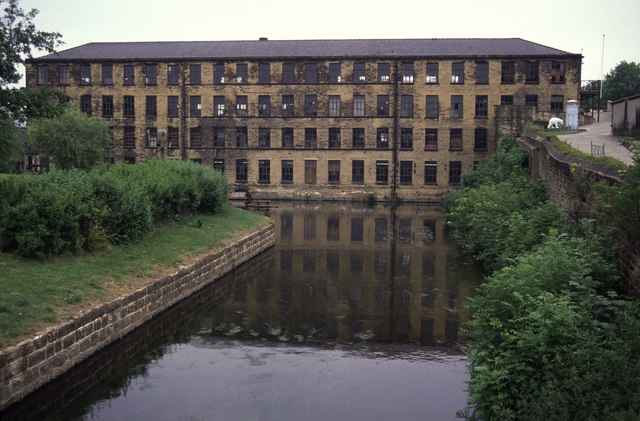
Leeds Industrial Museum at Armley Mills

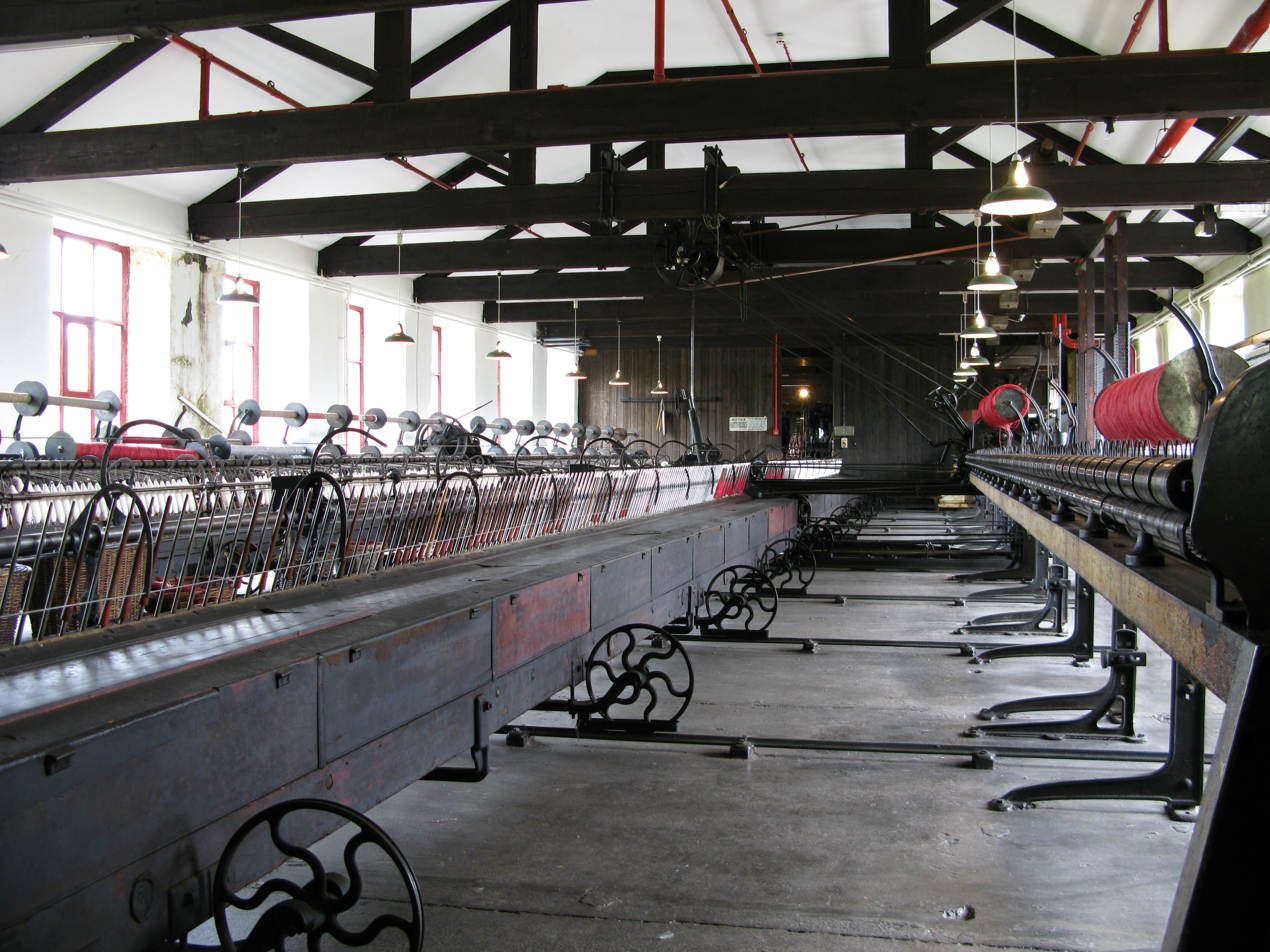
The spinning mule at Armley Mills Industrial Museum

The Leeds Industrial Museum at Armley Mills is a museum of industrial heritage located in Armley, near Leeds, in West Yorkshire, Northern England. The museum includes collections of textile machinery, railway equipment and heavy engineering amongst others.

The Grade II* listed building housing the museum was once the world's largest woollen mill. The current structures were built in 1805 by Benjamin Gott and closed as a commercial mill in 1969. They were taken over by Leeds City Council and reopened as a museum of industrial heritage in 1982. It is located between the Leeds and Liverpool Canal and the River Aire and accessed from Canal Road or Milford Place. It is part of Leeds Museums & Galleries, which also includes Leeds Art Gallery, Leeds City Museum, Leeds Discovery Centre, Lotherton Hall, Temple Newsam, Abbey House Museum and Kirkstall Abbey.

== Location ==
Armley Mills lie on the south bank and an island in the River Aire. The mill is 150 feet (46 m) above sea level, at a point where the river is falling. A weir has been built upstream, and this maintains a good head of water to power water wheels. Water from above the weir enters the millpond, it passes under the main mill and over the water wheels falling into the goit On the south bank of the river, on the 150 ft contour, the Leeds and Liverpool Canal was cut in 1777. This gave the mill a wharf which could be used for incoming raw materials, and outgoing goods and later for coal for the boilers.

Nearby is Botany Bay Yard which was so named because it was the first place in England where wool from Botany Bay in Australia was landed. There was a wharf at this location that served the Benjamin Gott Mill. There still exists the remains of the wharf unloading shed and what appears to be a sunken barge alongside the canal at this location.

== History ==
The earliest record of Armley Mills dates from the middle of the sixteenth century when local clothier Richard Booth leased 'Armley Millnes' from Henry Saville. A document of 1707 describes them as fulling mills. One contained two wheels and four fulling stocks, while another was used to grind corn mill and two fulling stocks'. The mills expanded and by 1788 were equipped with five waterwheels driving eighteen fulling stocks. Fulling was a necessary but dirty process where woven wool is felted. The bundles of cloth are hit repeatedly by large hammers, the fulling stocks, while soaked in water, urine and a clay known as Fuller's earth. The urine which is a source of ammonia was collected from neighbouring houses, who saved it especially for the purpose.

The mills were sold in 1788, ten years after the new canal opened. It was bought by Colonel Thomas Lloyd, a Leeds cloth merchant, who expanded it to be the world's largest woollen mill. He leased the running of the mills to Israel and John Burrows; they built semi-detached house for themselves on the far bank of the canal.

In 1804/1805 the mills were sold to Benjamin Gott- but burnt down. The early mills were fire hazards, the fibres in the air igniting and setting fire to the flammable structure. Gott rebuilt the mill using fireproof principles: the mill structure survives and it is this structure that has achieved a grade II* listing. Gott was the owner of several woollen mills. He died in 1840 and was succeeded by his sons John Gott and William Gott. They introduced a steam engine to supplement the water wheels in 1850 but it was in the 1860s that the waterwheels were phased out.

By 1907 part of the mill had been let out to tenants in a room and power agreement. The woollen clothing manufacturers Bentley and Tempest took over the mill: an accident book relating to dangerous incidents which occurred during their tenure is in the museum's possession. Operations at the mill ceased in 1969, a victim to the changing technology, loss of market and the prevailing economic conditions. It was sold to Leeds City Council, who re-opened it as a museum of industry in 1982.

The museum suffered damage in the 2015 Boxing day flood but has since reopened.

== Buildings ==
The buildings are principally from Benjamin Gott's 1805 construction, with some 19th century infill and a little of the 1795 corn mill that hadn't been destroyed in the fire in 1804. The mill is l-shaped on sloping ground so varies between four storey and two storey. The main range runs north–south over the millrace and is 23 bays wide, built of ashlar stone with a hipped slate roof. It has a six bay easterly projection (downstream), known as the Corn Mill, built into the sloping ground which is thus two storeys high.

The mill was built to a fireproof design, The cast iron columns are circular and support brick floors built as shallow arches. In the earlier work that did survive the fire, wooden joists are isolated with sheet-iron which has been nailed to them. The roof structure in the main range was replaced in 1929 and is no longer to fireproof standards.

The mill race flows under the main range of the mill and at water level are 6 finely detailed arches with wrought iron grills. The 1788 mill was powered by 5 waterwheels. The 1805 mill was powered by two metal wheels, named Wellington and Blucher, heroes in the current fights against Napoleon. They were suspension wheels with rim-gearing as pioneered by Thomas Hewes. These wheels were rated at 70 horse power. (Note: Steam engines could not produce 70 bhp until 1835.) A beam engine was introduced to supplement the wheels in 1855, The wheels were replaced and removed in 1885 but photographs do exist of them in situ. A further older wooden wheel that powered the corn mill is extant, but in need of repair.

In 1805 the mill was the world's largest woollen mill containing 18 fulling stocks and 50 looms.

== Collections ==
Leeds was an industrial powerhouse in the eighteenth and nineteenth centuries. The collections at the museum intend to reflect both historic and contemporary industrial heritage in the city. This includes archives and objects belonging to John Smeaton, Matthew Murray, Systime Computers, Elizabeth Beecroft and many others.

=== Textile gallery ===
The gallery shows the complete woollen manufacturing process in what was a woollen mill. The final product demonstrated here is a blanket. There is a, as listed below

Carding machine
1904 Platt Brothers & Co, condensor mule
that is in working order
Warping machine with creel
Hattersley Standard Loom
Hollingworth Knowles of Dobcross Jacquard Loom
this loom was built to the design in the firms 1909 patent. It was in use until 1980 at Kaye and Stewart's in Huddersfield.
Blanket Loom
Fulling stocks
Raising gig
the nap on a blanket is raised by scouring it with a fine hooks. This involves a drum containing rows of teasels
Cropping machine
when the nap is raised it is irregular so it must be sheared to a uniform height
Cutting machine
woollen cloth is heavy and is damaged by rolling, it must be folded. This is done using a cutting machine, made by J H Riley and Co of Bury.
Pressing machine
there are two varieties, this one is a hydraulic rotary press

=== Railway collection ===
The museum has an extensive collection of standard gauge and narrow gauge railway rolling stock. The collection was started in 1956 when the Leeds City Museum acquired Barber from the recently closed Harrogate Gasworks Railway. A short display line is installed at Armley allowing some of the collection to run.

==== Locomotives ====
| Name | Builder | Gauge | Wheel arrangement | Date | Works number | Notes |
|---|---|---|---|---|---|---|
| Barber | Thomas Green & Son | 2 ft (610 mm) | 0-6-2T | 1908 | | ex Harrogate Gas Works Railway. Acquired 1956. Currently on long-term loan to the South Tynedale Railway |
| Jack | Hunslet Engine Company | 18 in (457 mm) | 0-4-0WT | 1898 | 684 | Acquired 1957 |
| Lord Granby | Hudswell Clarke | 3 ft (914 mm) | 0-4-0ST | 1902 | | Acquired 1961 |
| Junin | Hudswell Clarke | 2 ft 6 in (762 mm) | 2-6-2DM | 1930 | | Diesel hydraulic locomotive from the Junin railway in Chile |
| Southam 2 | Hudswell Clarke | 4 ft 8 1/2 in (1,435 mm) | 0-4-0DM | 1942 | D625 | Ex-Rugby Cement, Southam, Warwickshire |
| | E. B. Wilson and Company | 4 ft 8 1/2 in (1,435 mm) | 0-6-0 | 1855 | | Modified frames, wheels, cylinders and motion of Oxford Worcester & Wolverhampton Railway no 34, later GWR 252. Used as an instructional model at Wolverhampton until 1964. Currently dismantled and not on view. |

==== Models ====
The museum collection has several models of significance, including the world's oldest model locomotive. The record is held by a model built in Matthew Murray in 1811 as a prototype for the locomotive Salamanca.

== See also ==
- Listed buildings in Leeds (Armley Ward)
- British narrow gauge railways
