= Newall with Clifton =

Civil parish in North Yorkshire, England

Coordinates: 53°56′N 1°42′W

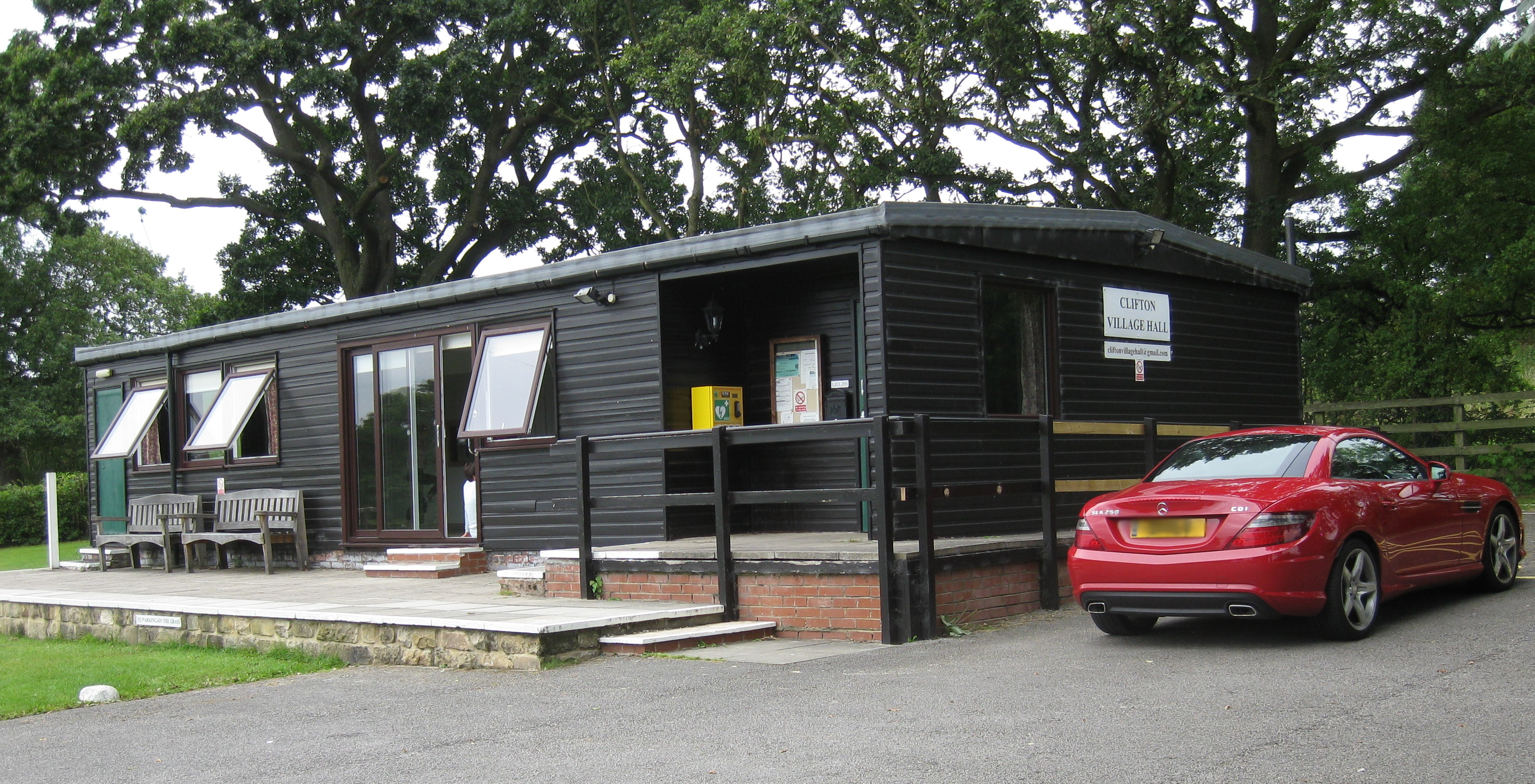
- Clifton Village Hall, Newall Carr Road

- Location within North Yorkshire
- Population: 147 (2011 census)
- Civil parish: Newall with Clifton
- Unitary authority: North Yorkshire
- Ceremonial county: North Yorkshire
- Region: Yorkshire and the Humber
- Country: England
- Sovereign state: United Kingdom

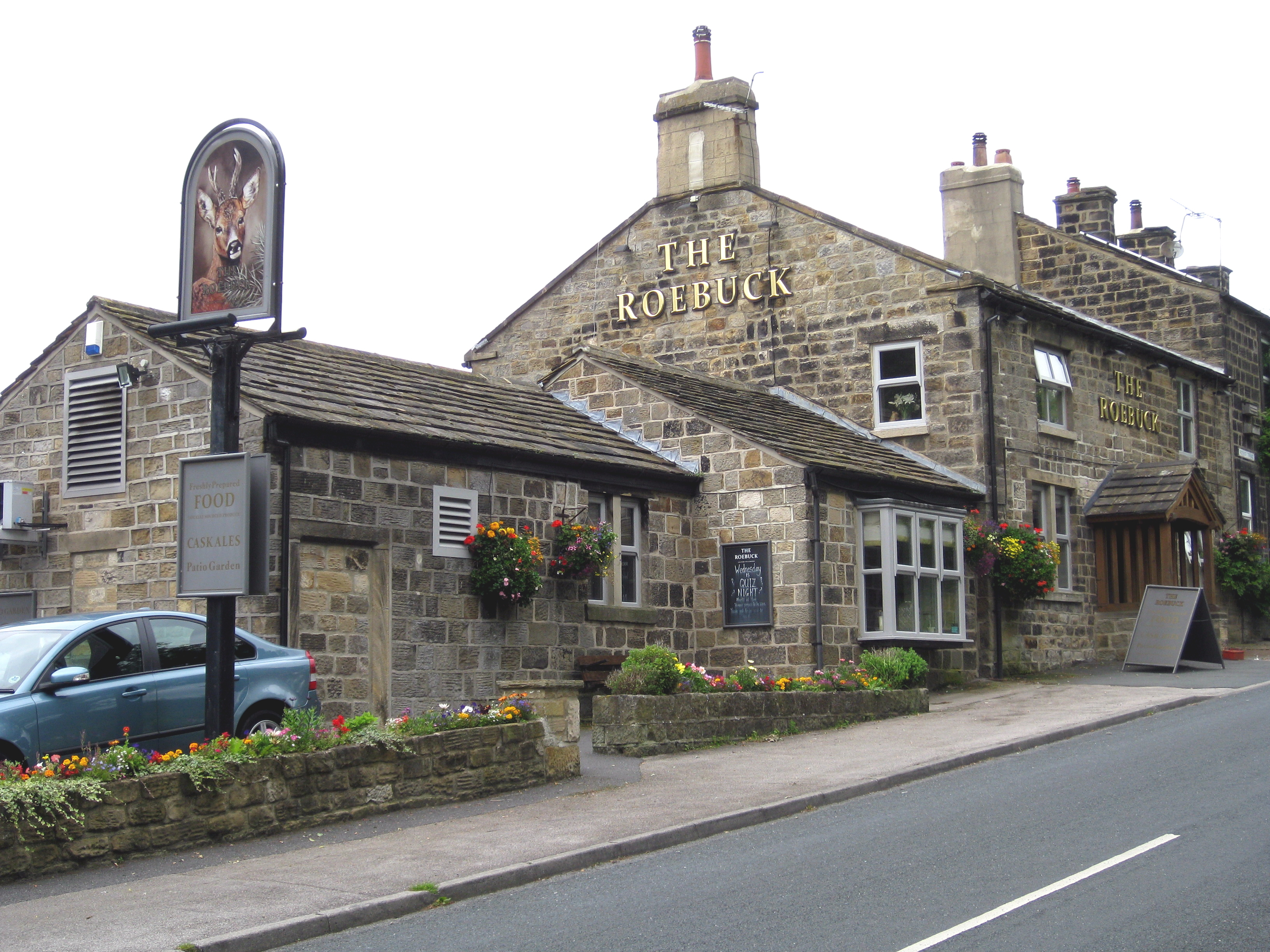
The Roebuck, Newall Carr Road

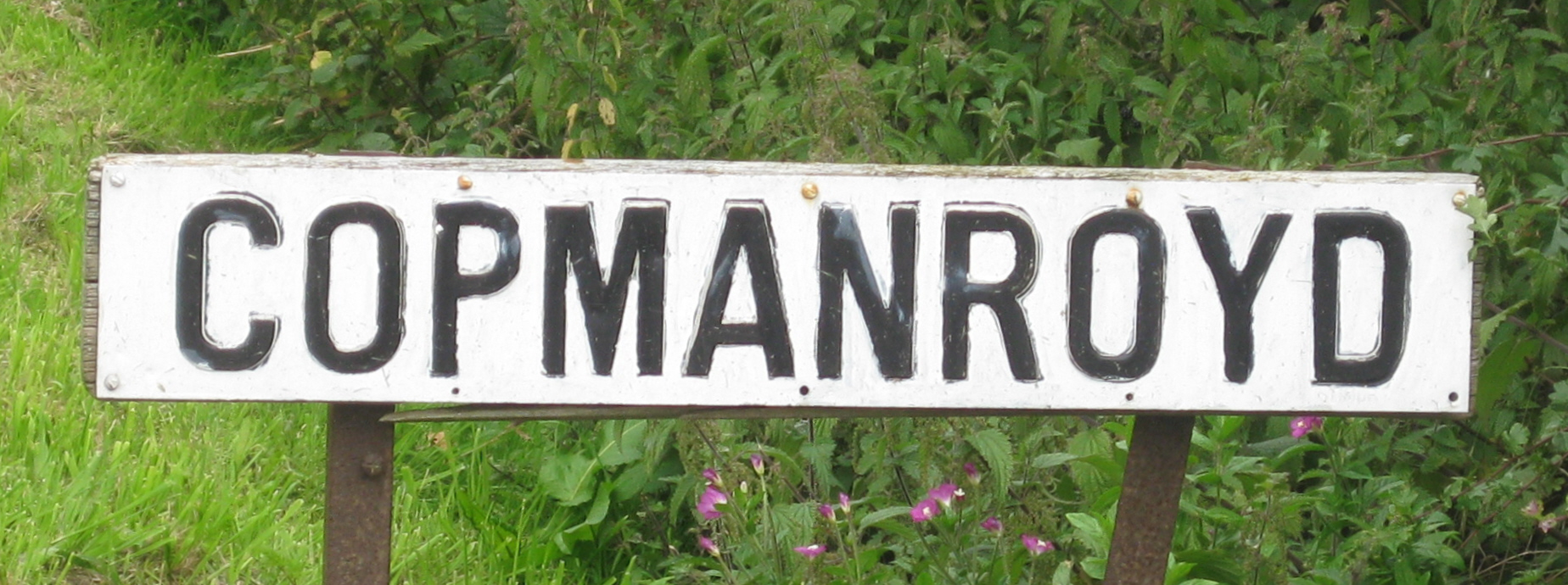
Copmanroyd sign

Newall with Clifton (historically also spelt Newell with Clifton) is a civil parish in North Yorkshire, England. It lies two miles north of Otley in West Yorkshire. The main settlement in the parish is the small village of Clifton. Despite its name, Newall is no longer in the parish, and lies across the border in West Yorkshire. They are joined by Newall Carr Road, which runs North from Otley Bridge. In the 2011 census the population of the parish was 147.

== History ==
Clifton is known in the form "Cliftune" from the 10th century, with "Biceratune" (bee-keeper's farm) somewhere in what is now Newall. (This name is preserved in Bickerton Way on the 1950s Weston estate.) The name "Niuhale" appears in the 12th century, meaning New Hall, which provided the basis for the village around it, to distinguish it from an existing hall. At this time the hamlet of Copmanroyd (merchant's clearing) was known, and still exists as a few buildings along a road to the East of Newall Carr Road. In the medieval parish, Newall occupied low-lying pasture lands in a bend on the North side of the River Wharfe, with Clifton being high ground (above 300 ft) to the North, as far as the River Washburn.

Newall with Clifton was historically a township in the large ancient parish of Otley in the West Riding of Yorkshire. It became a separate civil parish in 1866. In 1903 the southern part of the civil parish, including the village of Newall, was transferred to the civil parish and urban district of Otley. In 1974 Newall was transferred, with the rest of Otley, to the City of Leeds Metropolitan Borough in the new county of West Yorkshire, whereas the civil parish of Newall with Clifton was transferred to Harrogate district in North Yorkshire. In 2023 Newall with Clifton became part of North Yorkshire unitary district.

Newall sits in the Otley and Yeadon ward of Leeds City Council and the Leeds North West parliamentary constituency.

== Buildings ==
Clifton village shows the medieval pattern of strips of land (tofts) behind dwellings on Clifton Lane, and includes many listed buildings. In the 19th century there was a Wesleyan Chapel. The only pub is the Roebuck (a building from 1752 and licensed from 1852), locally known as "The Spite" because of rivalry with another pub, The Travellers Rest which opened in 1853 (now private dwellings) such that they refused to serve a customer who had been seen in the other one.

== Notable people ==
- Elizabeth Beecroft, ironmaster

== See also ==
- Listed buildings in Newall with Clifton
