= Christ Church, Armley =

Anglican church in Armley, West Yorkshire, England

Christ Church
- Christ Church
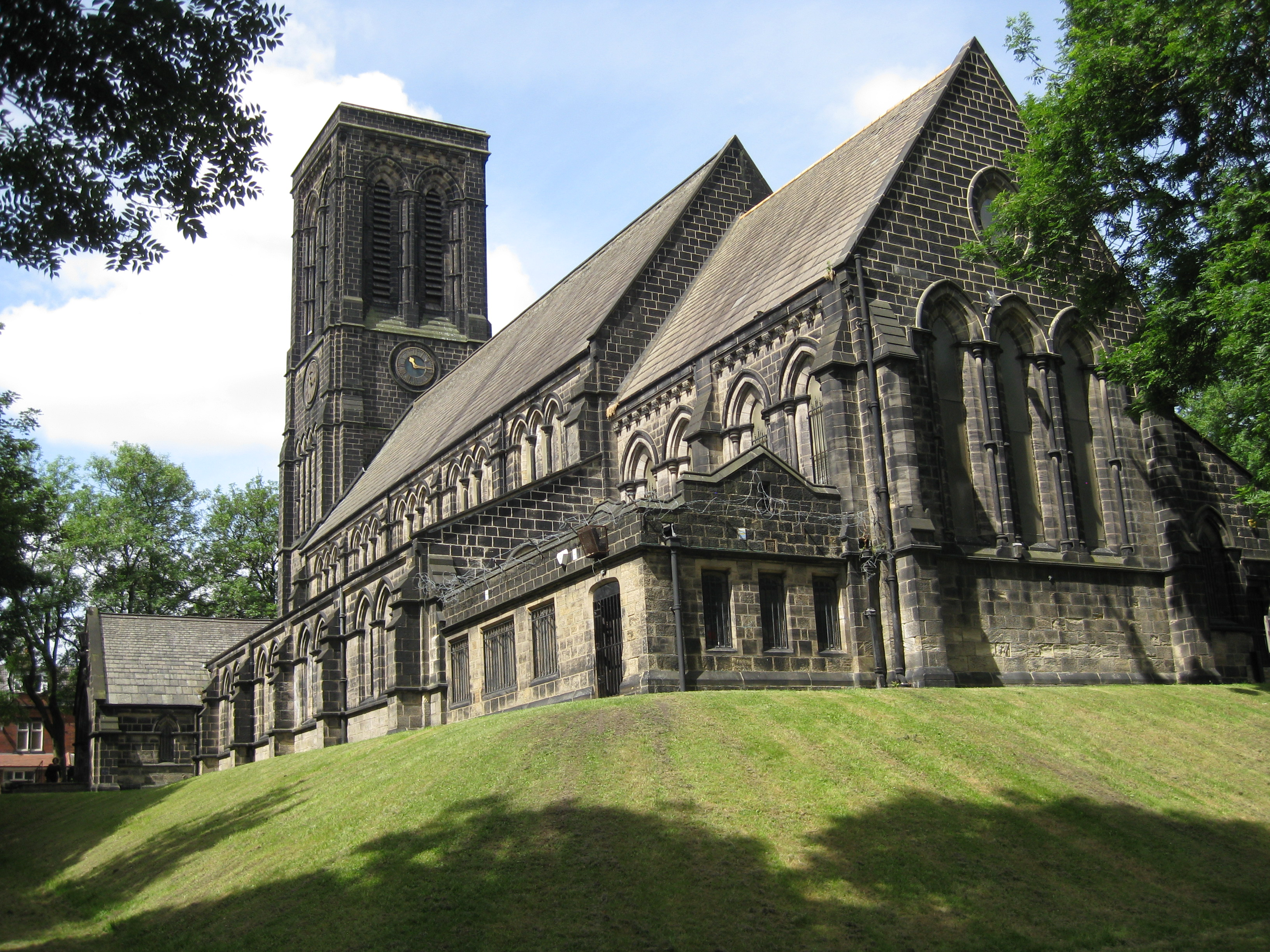
- View from North-East
- Christ Church
- 53.7992°N 1.5981°W
- OS grid reference: SE 26570 33730
- Location: Armley, Leeds
- Country: England
- Denomination: Church of England

History
- Status: Parish Church

Architecture
- Architect: Richard L. Adams
- Style: Gothic revival architecture
- Groundbreaking: 1869
- Completed: 1872

Specifications
- Materials: Coursed square gritstone

Administration
- Province: York
- Diocese: Leeds
- Archdeaconry: Leeds
- Parish: Armley

Christ Church in Armley, Leeds, West Yorkshire, England is an active Anglican parish church in the archdeaconry of Leeds and the Diocese of Leeds. The church is one of two Church of England churches in Armley; the other being the larger St. Batholomew's Church. It is a Grade II listed building.

== History ==
A number of parishoners [sic] had been seriously questioning the future of the church, but it was the present vicar who put forward the ideas which were eventually acted upon. To cut the high costs of heating, the ceiling was lowered and the nave was divided so that 250 to 350 seats can still be used.

— BBC Domesday Project, 1986

The church broke ground in 1869 and was completed in 1872, having been built to a design by architect Richard L. Adams. The church was listed in 1976 and modernised internally in 1984. In 1986 the church was included in the BBC's Domesday Project, having its particulars recorded for posterity. The question of the future viability of the church was recorded in the project.

== Location ==
The church is in Upper Armley at the junction of Theaker Lane, Moorfield Road and Armley Ridge Road. It is the closest of the Anglican churches to the centre of Armley.

== Architectural style ==
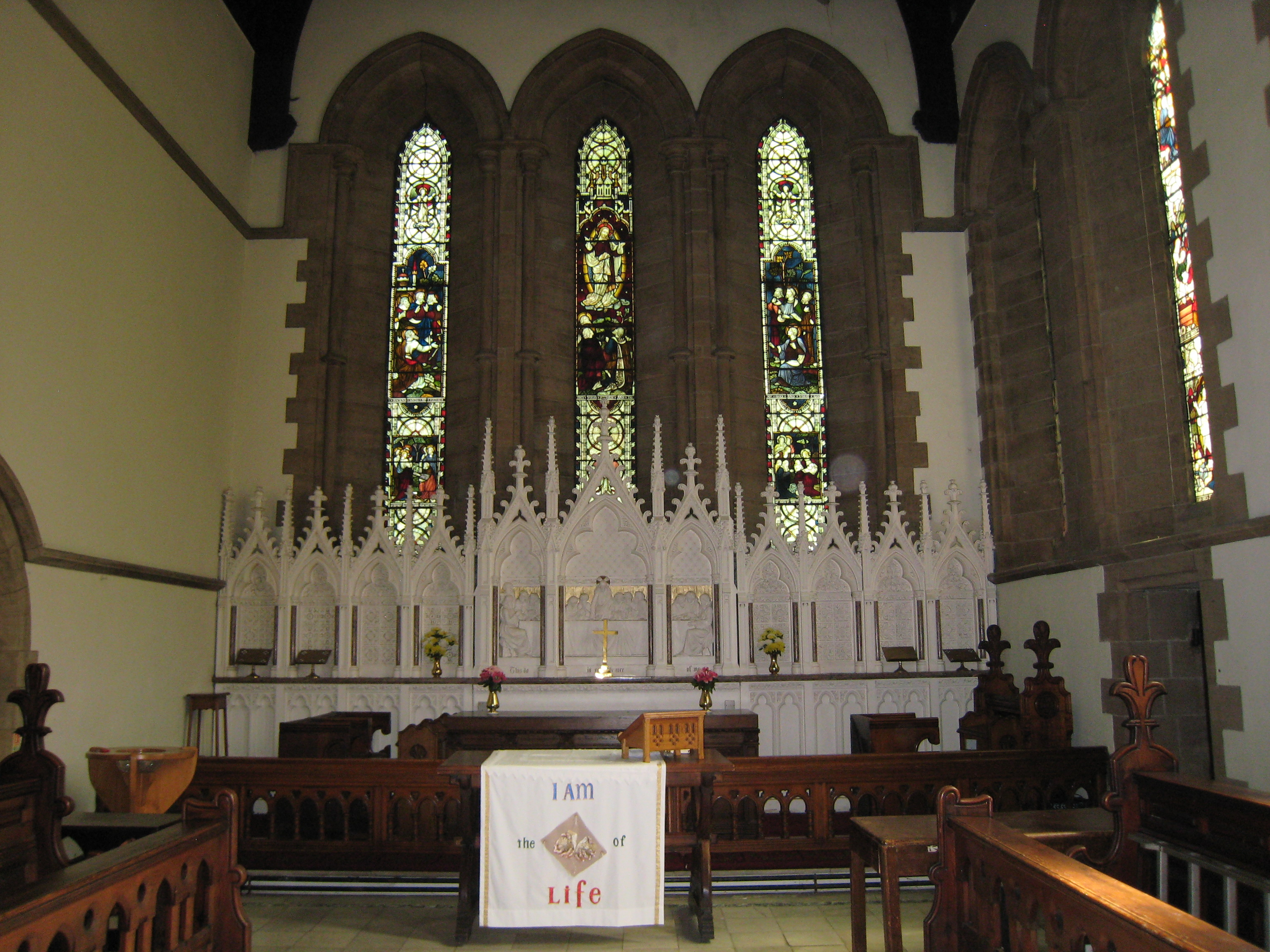
Altar and chancel windows

The church is built of coursed square gritstone and has a pitched slate roof. Designed in the Gothic Revival style, the church has a tall imposing nave with tripartite clerestory windows.

== See also ==
- List of places of worship in the City of Leeds
- Listed buildings in Leeds (Armley Ward)
