= FC de Junin =

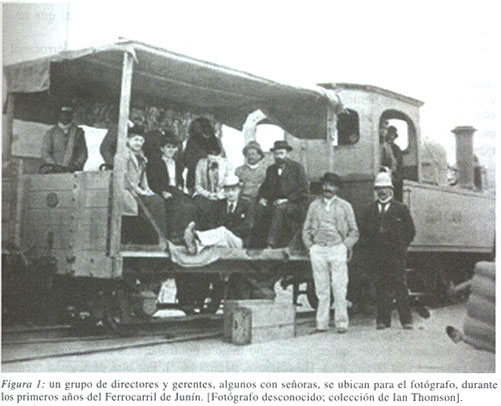
Managers, their wife and workers at the locomotive

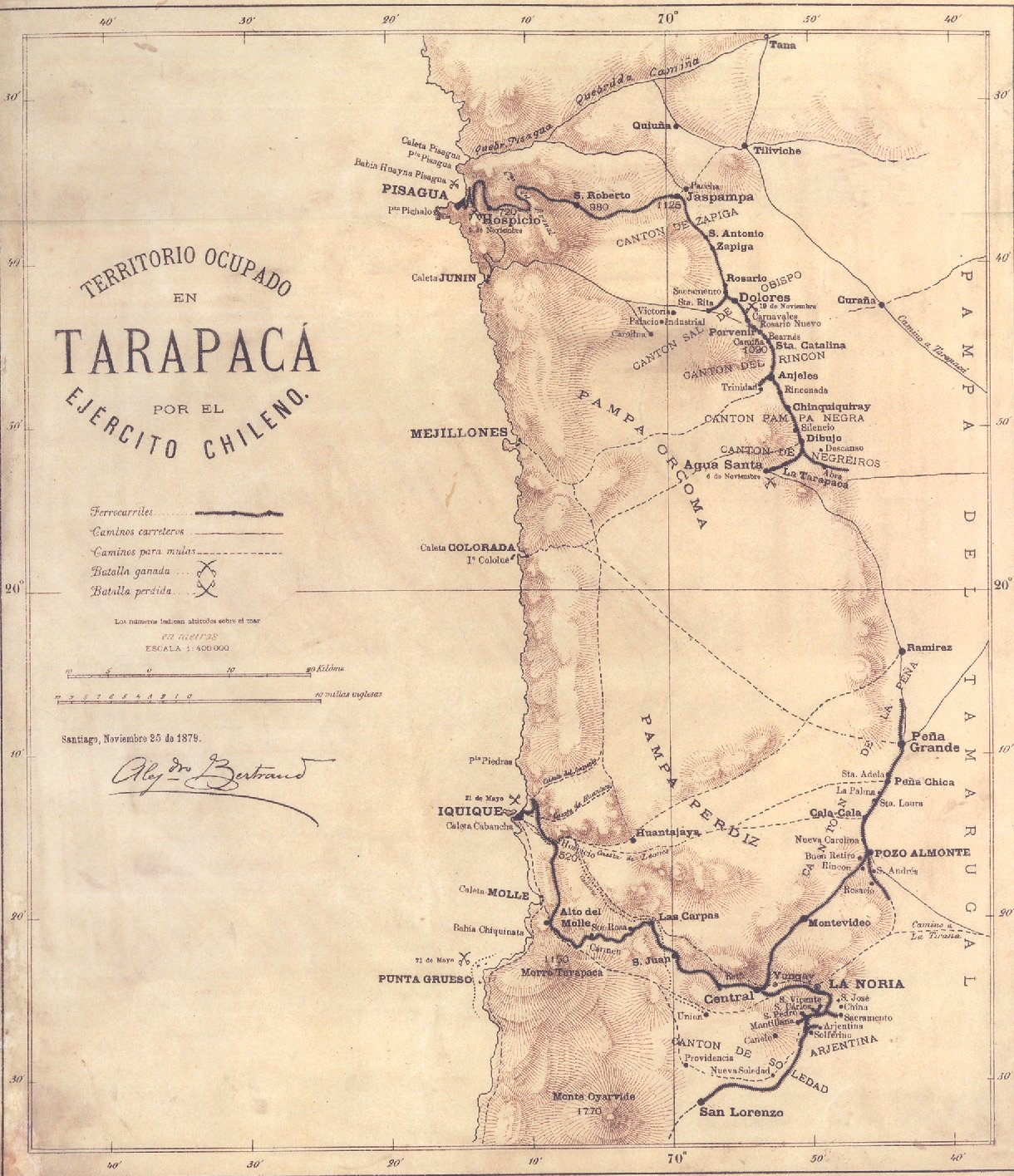
Map of the territory occupied in Tarapacá by the Chilean Army, during the War of the Pacific, November 25 of 1879. Caleta Junín is on the map, south of Pisagua. Oficina Reducto was located in the Canton Pampa Negra, east of Mejillones, Chile. The line between Peña Grande und Agua Santa still doesn't exist.

The Ferrocarril de Junin was a 2 ft 6 in (762 mm) narrow gauge railway operating in northern Chile, and was built to serve the nitrate workings. The terminal of the railway was located at the port of Junin, and the railway was opened in 1894. The first section of the railway consisted of a 1 km incline plane, rising from the port to 674 metres above sea-level, that is a 67.4% grade. From the top of the incline there was a 51 km main line to Oficina Reducto. Branching off the main line was a 17 km branch to Aragon, and 8 other branches totalling 39 km.

The locomotive stock consisted of five 0-6-2 tank locomotives by Avonside, as well as two 0-6+6-0 Fairlie locomotives manufactured by the Yorkshire Engine Company and at least one small electric locomotive made by the Baldwin Locomotive Works. The railway operated in one of the driest areas on earth, and cartage of water for the steam locomotive boilers was a major expense. In 1930 the railway purchased a 2-6-2 diesel locomotive constructed by Hudswell Clarke . This locomotive, named Junin, is believed to be the first to have used the road switcher layout. Although a success the locomotive failed to avert the closure of the railway in 1931. Although Junin survived it is in a very bad state, it now lives in the Armley Mills Museum in Leeds.
