= Edmund Schulze =

German organ builder (1824–1878)

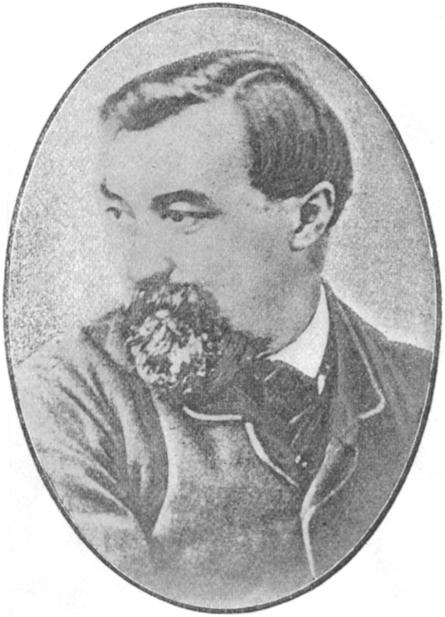
Edmund Schulze, as depicted in Musical Times, February 1, 1900

Heinrich Edmund Schulze (26 March 1824 - 13 July 1878) was a German organ builder. He was the last of five generations of the Schulze family to build organs, starting with Hans Elias Schulze (1688–1762), Edmund's great-great-grandfather. He died of tuberculosis.

Schulze exhibited an organ in England at the Great Exhibition of 1851. A number of English commissions followed on from this. Among his celebrated organs are one in St George's Minster, Doncaster and one built for Meanwood Towers, Meanwood, Leeds, West Yorkshire, England in 1869 and later transferred first to St. Peter's Church, Harrogate, North Yorkshire and then to St. Bartholomew's Church, Armley, Leeds in 1879, where it is still in use. The organ originally in the church of St Mary, Tyne Dock, was transferred to Ellesmere College in 1980.

Ellesmere's Schulze has its own Facebook page called "The St. Mary Tyne Dock Schulze Organ Trust"
