= Leeds Blitz =

WWII air raids on Leeds, England

- Part of the Strategic bombing campaign of World War II
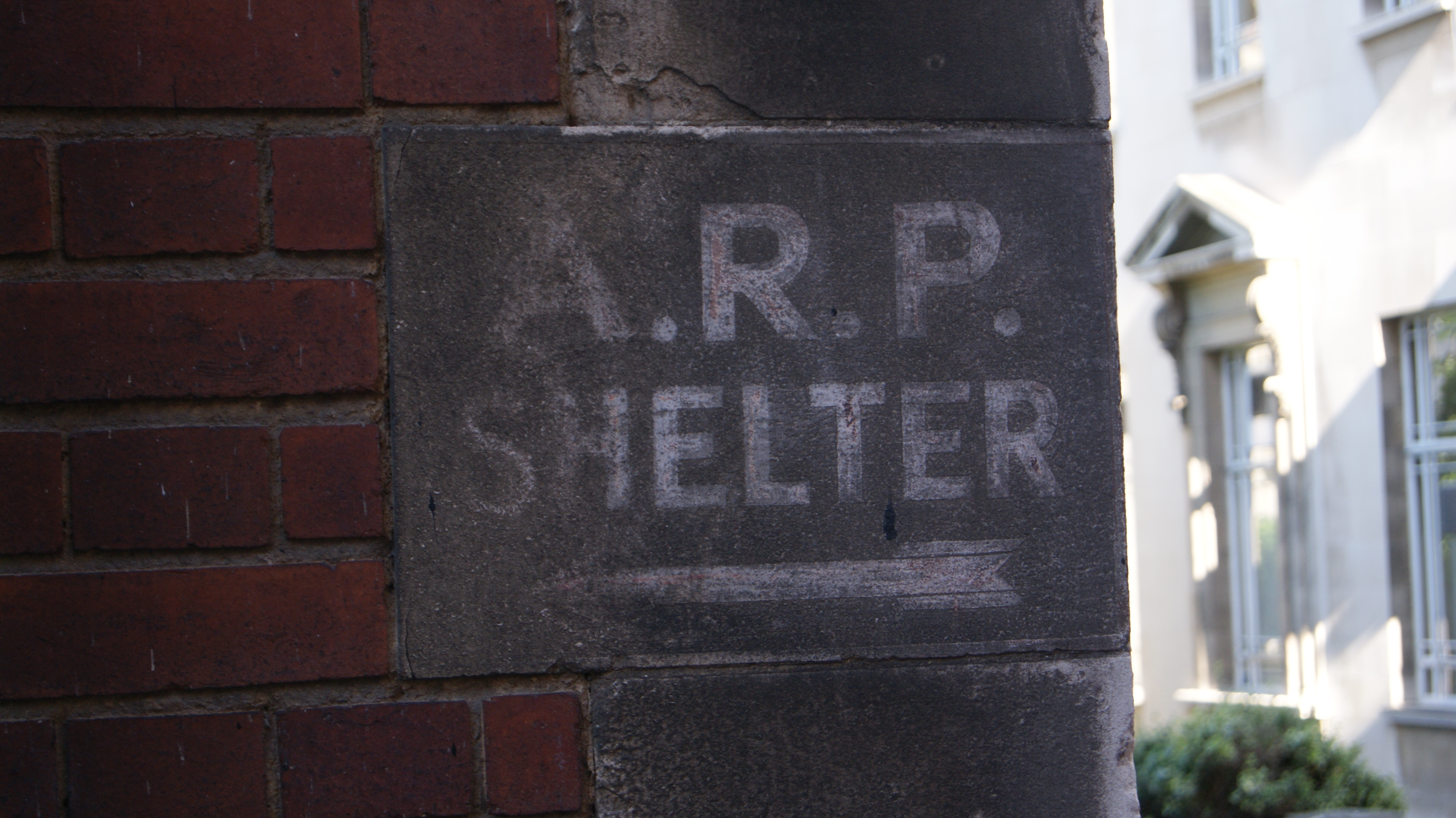
- Directions to an ARP shelter at the University of Leeds
| Date | 1940–42 |
| Location | United Kingdom |
| Result | Damage to Leeds infrastructure, main industrial targets remain intact |

Belligerents
| United Kingdom | Germany |

The Leeds Blitz comprised nine air raids on the city of Leeds by the Nazi German Luftwaffe. The heaviest raid took place on the night of 14/15 March 1941, affecting the city centre, Beeston, Bramley and Armley. The city was subjected to other raids during the Second World War, but they were relatively minor; only the March 1941 raid caused widespread damage, including to the city's museum and its artefacts.

== Background ==
Leeds is a large city in the industrial heartland of the West Riding of Yorkshire. The county's largest city, much of the region's economic, administrative and industrial activities were centred on Leeds which was also an important rail hub. Many industrial manufacturers around the city such as Avro at RAF Yeadon (now Leeds Bradford Airport) which produced Lancaster bombers, Kirkstall Forge, Barnbow munitions works and ROF Thorp Arch near Wetherby adapted their output for war work providing likely raid targets. Leeds had taken precautions, including building many public air raid shelters and large water tanks to be used for fire-fighting in the event of incendiary devices being dropped.

== 14–15 March raid ==
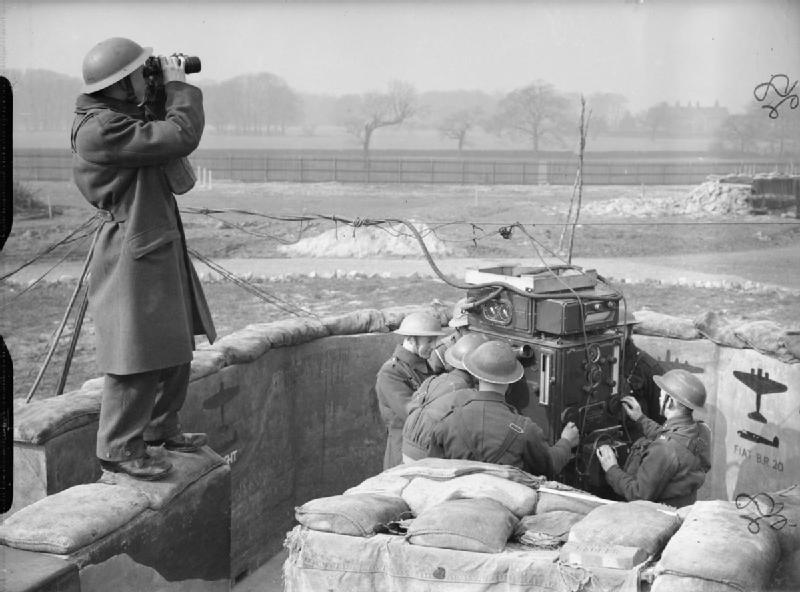
Spotter and predictor operators at a 4.5-inch anti-aircraft gun site in Leeds, 20 March 1941

Beginning just after 9 pm on Friday 14 March 1941, around 40 bombers took part in the raid on Leeds; in all 451 were over Britain that night. Incendiary bombs were first dropped onto the city on the Friday night, later high explosive bombs were dropped on the Saturday. Targets hit in the city centre included the Town Hall, the city's museum (then on Park Row), Leeds New station (now Leeds City station), the Kirkgate Markets, the Central Post Office, the Quarry Hill flats, the Hotel Metropole and the area now occupied by the Inner Ring Road. Around 100 houses were destroyed, 4,600 sustained damage, and around 65 people were killed.

Other nearby towns were also damaged in this raid. Huddersfield was damaged by bombers seeking the David Brown factory at Crosland Moor (at the time making parts for the Supermarine Spitfire), while central Castleford was also damaged by bombers seeking the Hickson and Welch chemical works and Ferrybridge power station. In total 25 tons of bombs fell on Leeds during the raid, a quarter of the 100 tons often used as the threshold for a "major raid". By comparison, that night in Glasgow 203 aircraft dropped 231 tons of high explosives, nearly ten times the amount dropped on Leeds, and 1,650 incendiary canisters, while in nearby Sheffield 117 aircraft dropped 83 tons of high explosives and 328 incendiary canisters.

Owing to the censorship and secrecy during the war, the press did not mention Leeds by name after the raid, instead referring to it as a "North East Inland Town"; the frequent raids on Hull were often referred to as a raid on a "North East Coastal Town". German sources from the time claim raids on Glasgow, Leeds, Sheffield, Tilbury Docks, Plymouth and Southampton.

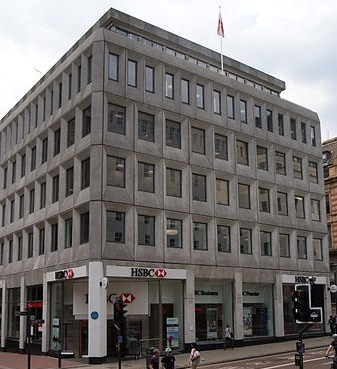
The site of the former museum

== Cultural losses ==
The bombing of the Leeds City Museum resulted in the losses of historic civic possessions including the destruction of a mummy and a taxidermed tiger. Curator Herbert Ricketts described salvaging artefacts after the bombing as having "a dig in our own museum". The museum's front, dating from 1821, was also damaged and had to be taken down. A concrete front was built replacing the destroyed Victorian facade. The museum closed in 1965 and was moved to the central library on the Headrow. The museum was demolished in 1966 and the site is now occupied by the HSBC bank. In 1999, the museum was moved from the library, and is now housed in the former Mechanics Institute on Millennium Square.

Other historic buildings were superficially damaged. At certain sites, such as the town hall, shrapnel damage is still evident.

== Fighter and ground defence ==
31st (North Midland) Anti-Aircraft Brigade was responsible for anti-aircraft defence of West Yorkshire, and throughout the war years Leeds had anti-aircraft guns positioned throughout the city. There were many RAF airfields to the east of the city in the Vale of York, while most were home to bomber command units, RAF Church Fenton was the base of a fighter squadron. On the night of the main Leeds raid Junkers Ju 88 and Dornier Do 17 aircraft were shot down over Northern England, indicating these could have been the bombers used over Leeds.

== Unexploded bombs ==
Following the raids, unexploded bombs have been found in the city including one in Potternewton Park in 2012. Unexploded anti-aircraft shells have also been found to the south and east of the city. Starting in September 1940, all unexploded bombs were to be logged in a detailed 'bomb diary', although the scheme was not at first initiated in Leeds.

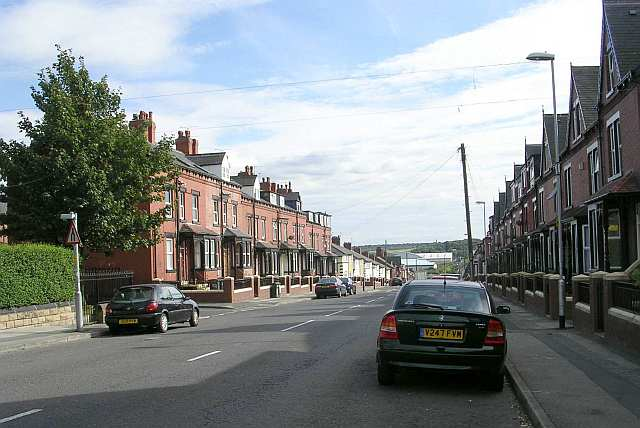
Tempest Road, where Harrison was sheltering during the raid

== Cultural influences ==
The Tony Harrison poem "Shrapnel" relates to the raid on Beeston and the possibility of an act of heroism on the part of the bomber crews given the number of bombs falling on Cross Flats Park in Beeston as well as comparing the bombing to the bombings of 7 July in London, of which two of the perpetrators came from Leeds. Harrison, at the time a child, was sheltering in the cellar of a house on Tempest Road in Beeston.

== See also ==
- Hull Blitz
- Sheffield Blitz
- Baedeker Raids, a programme of raids on historical cities that affected neighbouring York
