= Clem Crosby =

Contemporary artist living in London

Clem Crosby is a contemporary artist living and working in London, England. His work, mainly non-representational painting, is in the collection of the Tate, the Leeds City Museum, the Microsoft Art Collection and the Berkeley Art Museum. He was commissioned by the Young Vic theatre in London to create a permanent installation, titled 180 Monochrome Paintings.

== Career ==
Crosby began creating abstract paintings in about 1986. In 1994 his work was displayed at the Lisson Gallery in London, and some of his early work was included in a group exhibition in Copenhagen in 2000.

Crosby developed a method of painting which employed oil paint on formica on aluminum panels. Many of his paintings include patterned or free-flowing lines with a slick, wet texture, often drawn without lifting his brush, on simple backgrounds, to produce thick textured paint surfaces.

Over time, Crosby created a large number of monochrome works that were combined into a permanent exhibit at the Young Vic Theatre.
