= Millennium Square, Leeds =

Square in Leeds, England

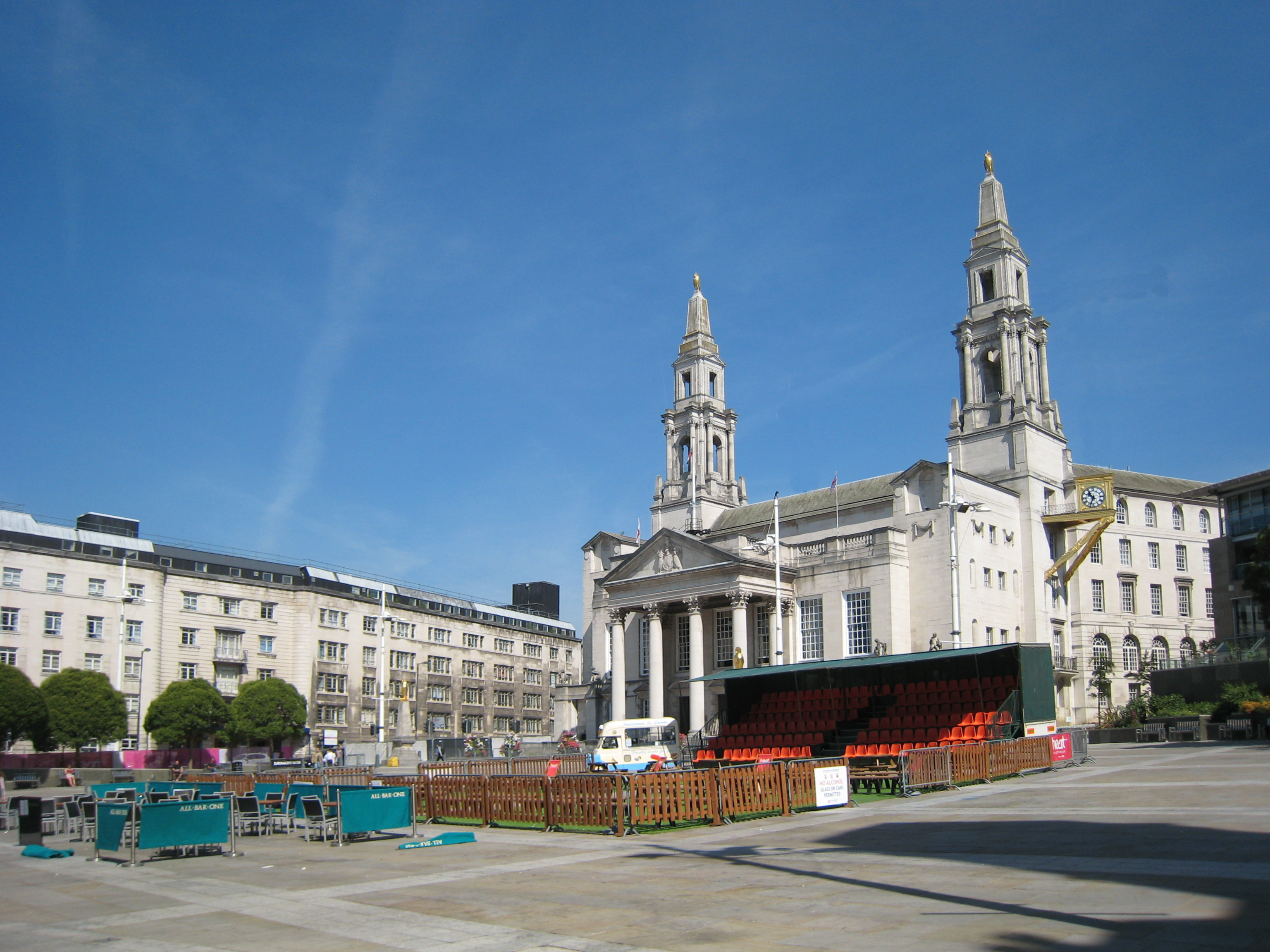
View of the main paved area, with seating to watch the TV. Brotherton Wing to left, Leeds Civic Hall to right

Millennium Square is a city square in the Civic Quarter of Leeds, West Yorkshire, England. It was Leeds's flagship project to mark the year 2000, and was jointly funded by Leeds City Council and the Millennium Commission. Total cost of construction was £12 million.

== Description ==
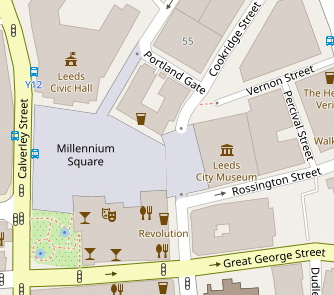
OpenStreetMap map of area

It is an L-shaped pedestrian and events area, on a South-facing slope running down from Leeds Civic Hall and bounded on the West by Calverley Street, on the other side of which is the Brotherton Wing of Leeds General Infirmary. It consists of three portions, a large open events area running East from Calverley Street; a smaller area to the East with seats and plants; and an area of seating, gardens and water features to the South. The events area is roughly rectangular and paved in York stone with granite strips dividing it into a grid, with the Civic Hall bordering about half of it. The other edge on the North is occupied by the newbuild Cuthbert Brodrick pub and restaurant (named after Leeds architect Cuthbert Brodrick). The East area with seats and plants goes up to the front of the Leeds City Museum (one of Brodrick's buildings). The South part by Calverley Street is called the Mandela Gardens, after Nelson Mandela. Beside this is the new Carriageworks Theatre, the north front of this being in white to allow use as a projection screen having a large TV screen and carrying the facilities for a stage which can be erected for events. Power and utilities, plus dressing rooms and toilets, are under the flat area for the stage. A control tower and electric substation are in a tower on the northeast of the square, by the Cuthbert Brodrick, disguised in a sculpture called "Off Kilter" by Richard Wilson which has been described as 'grenade shaped'.

To the East of the Carriageworks Theatre are older buildings with frontages on Great George Street: the Electric Press, a former 1900 printworks in red brick with a distinctive square chimney and a Grade II listed building, is now combined with adjacent properties based on a former carriageworks (hence the name of the theatre) which is also Grade II, and nowadays also signed The Electric Press. These have been adapted to contain bars, restaurants, and the Film and Media school of Leeds Beckett University. The commercial use of these buildings and the inclusion of the Cuthbert Broderick helped to pay for the square.

On the southeast corner of the square, on the crossroads with Cookridge Street and Great George street is another former printworks and Grade II listed building, the Leonardo Building. It was refurbished and a modern extension put on it on the north side in 1998, just as work was beginning on Millennium Square. The architect was Leeds Civic Architect, John Thorp. In October 2022, a fire broke out in the Leonardo Building, causing substantial damage. The fire service described the structure as "potentially unsafe".

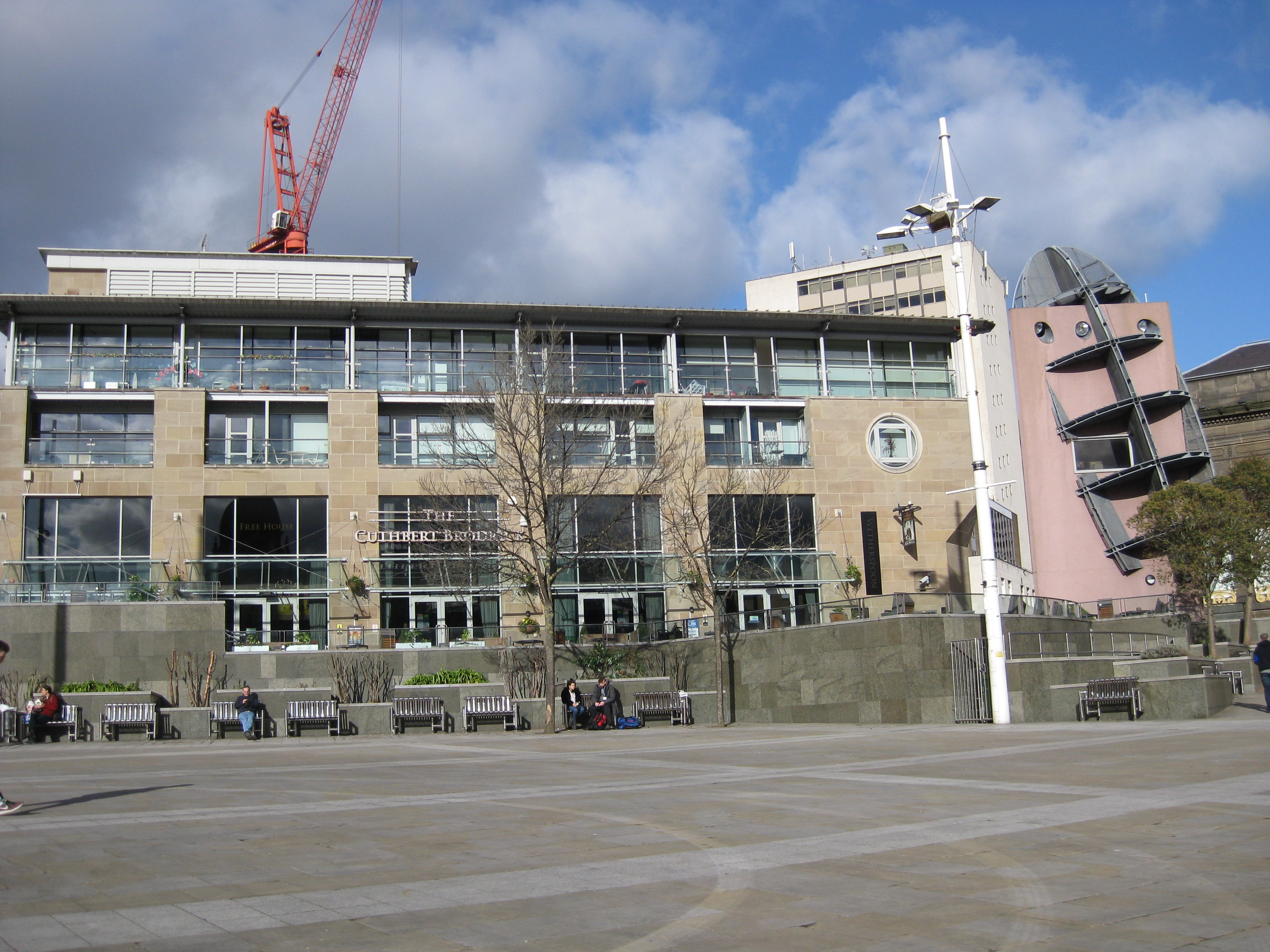
The Cuthbert Brodrick

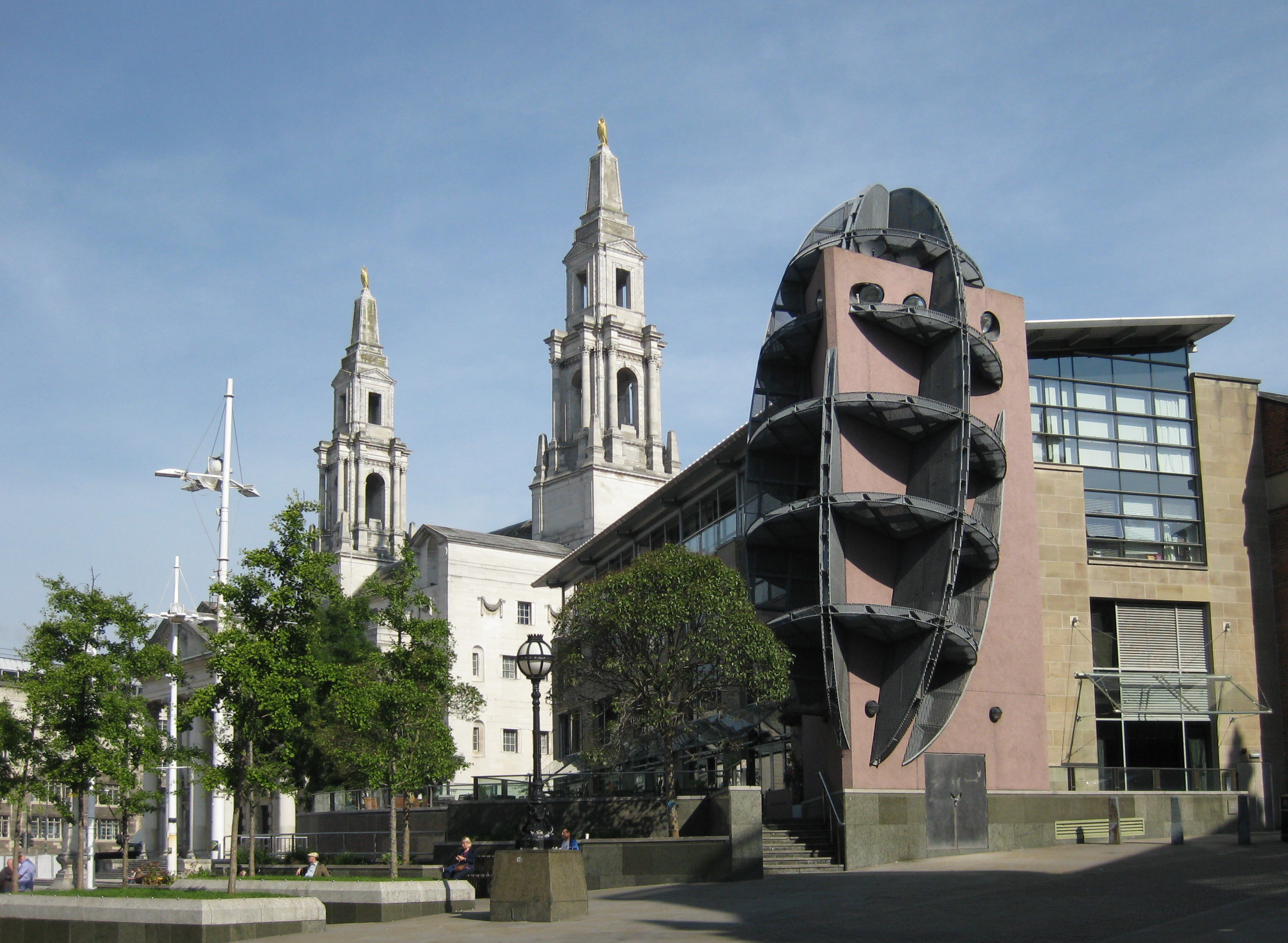
East area with "Off Kilter" control tower for stage show

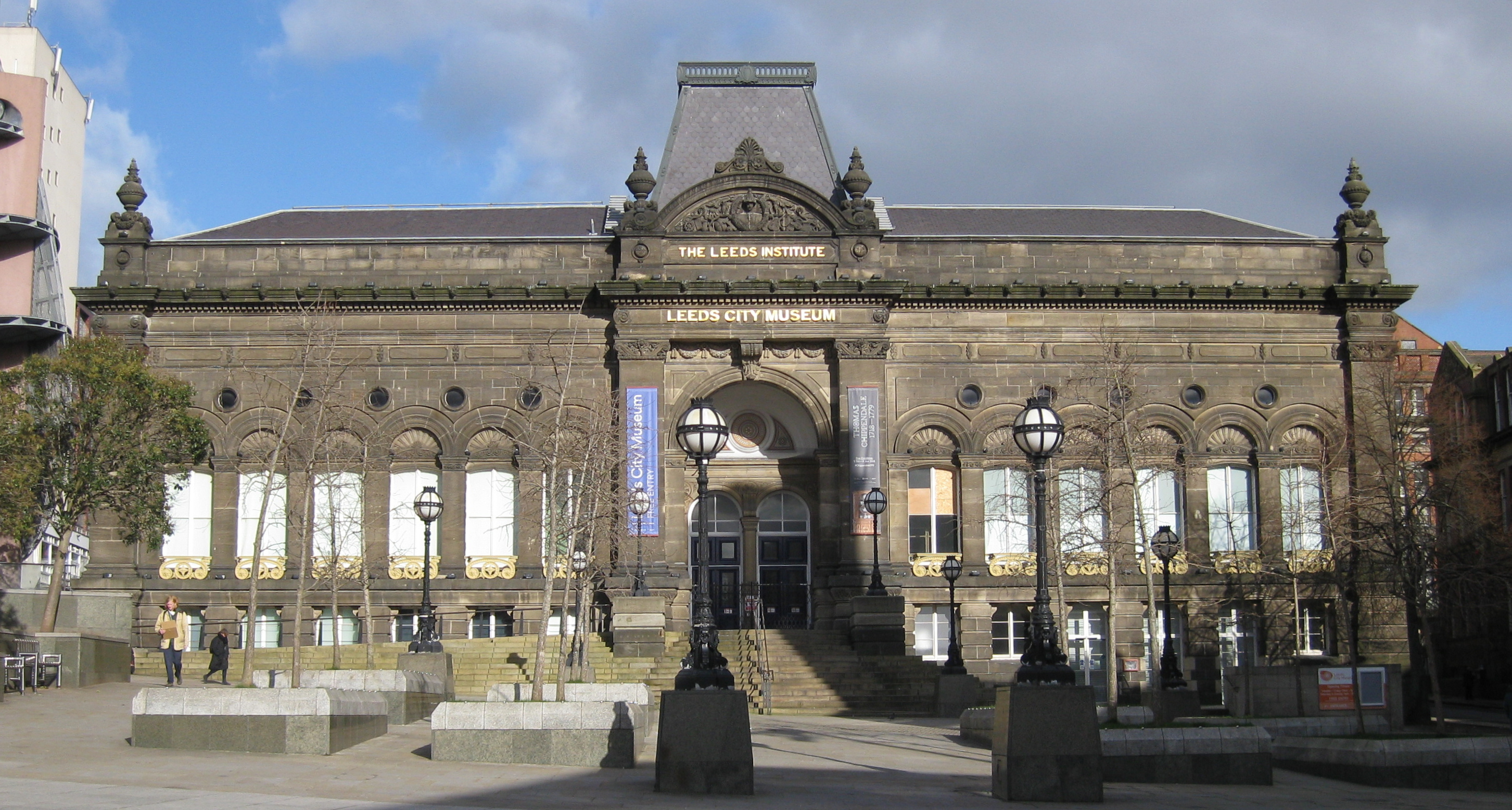
Leeds City Museum

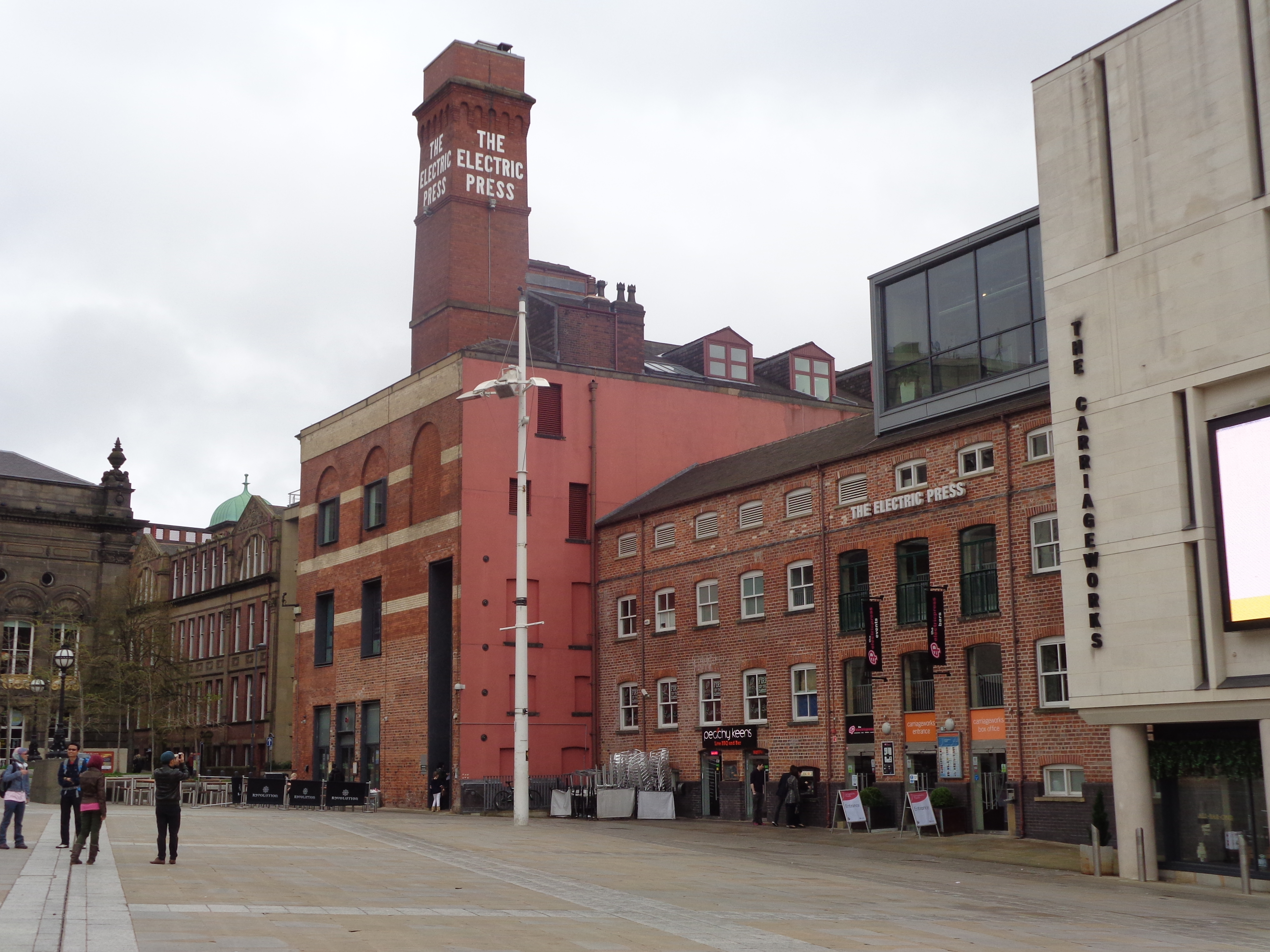
The Electric Press

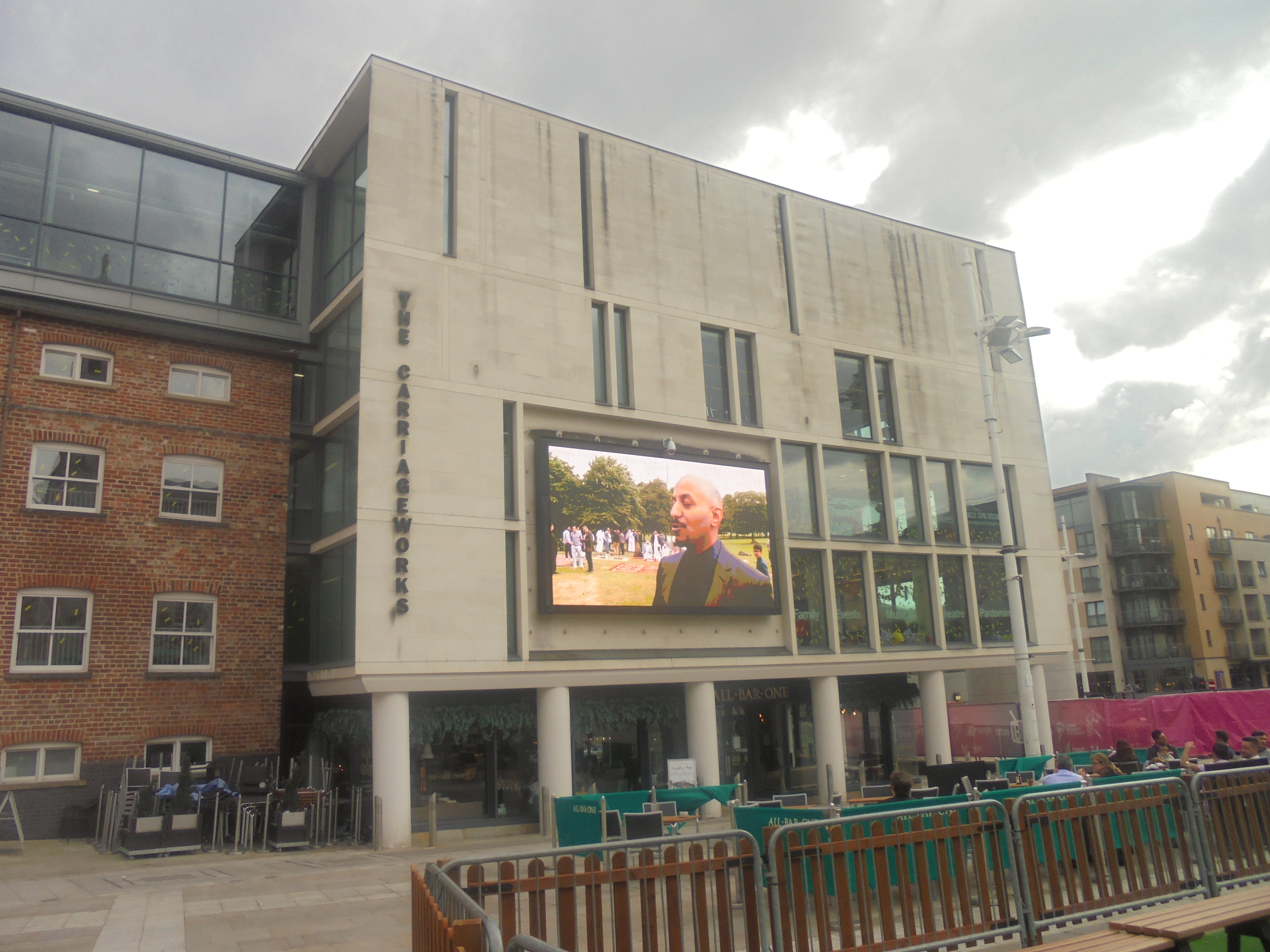
The Carriageworks with TV screen

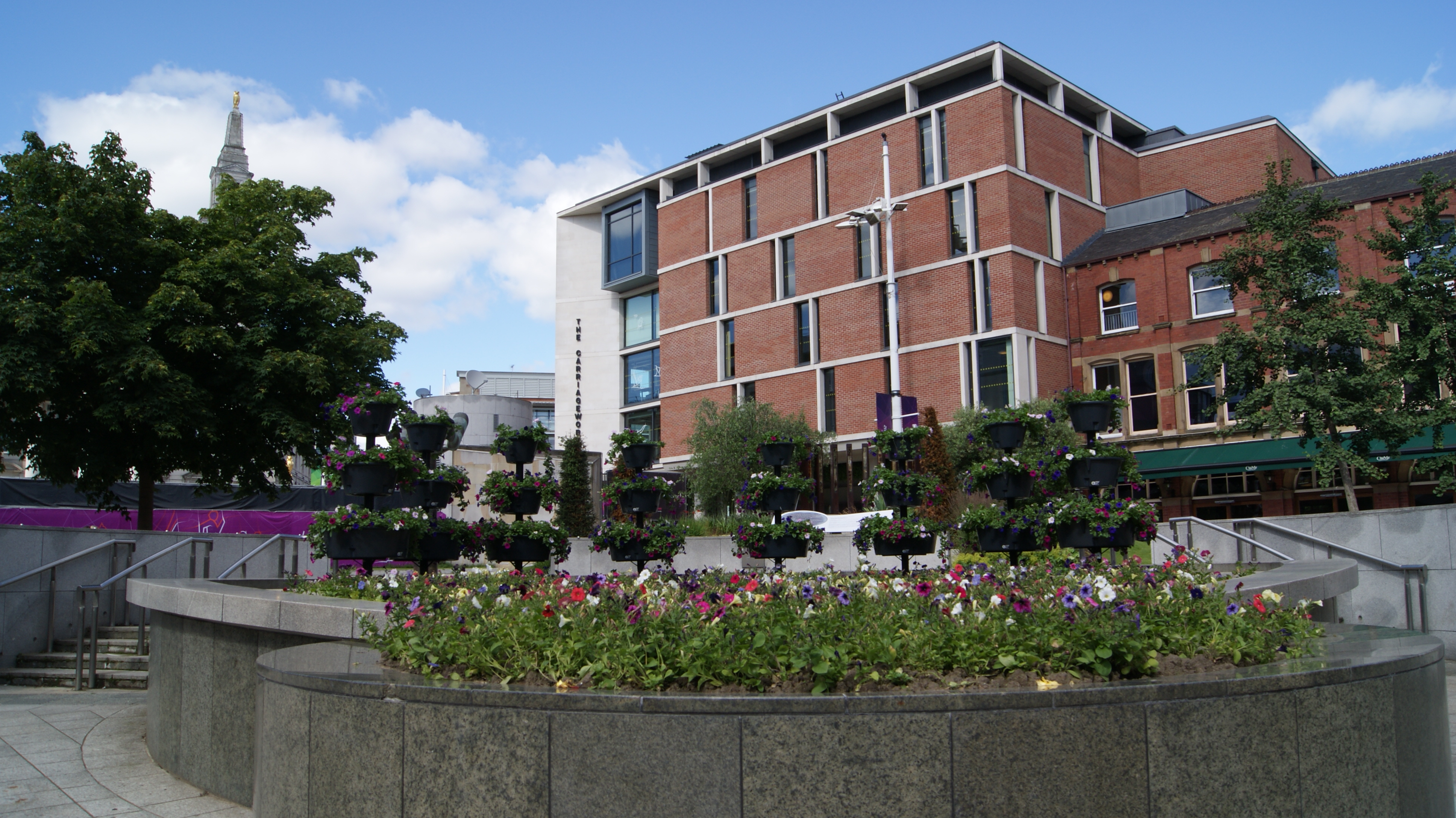
Carriageworks building viewed from Mandela Gardens

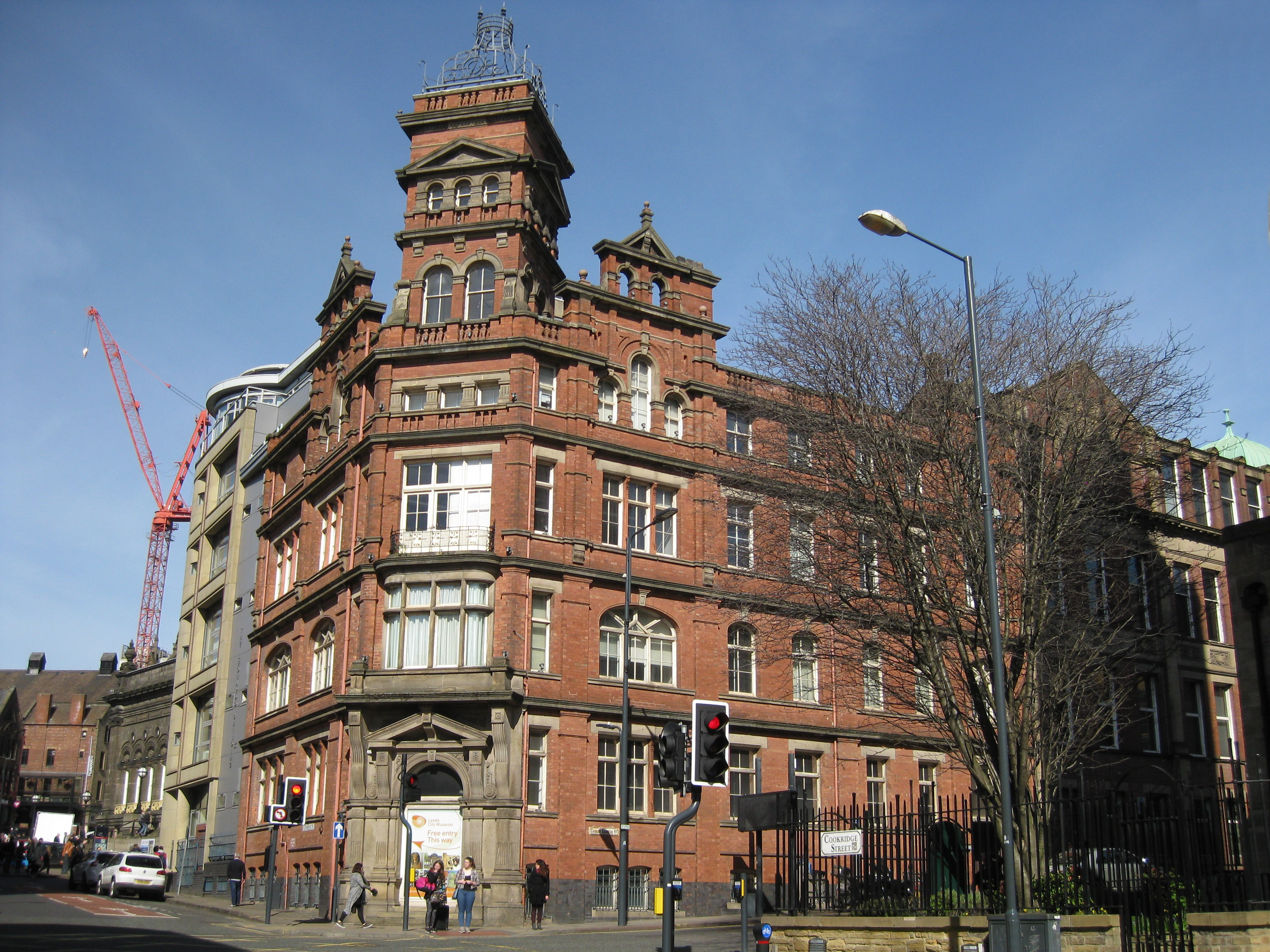
Leonardo Building

=== Mandela Gardens ===
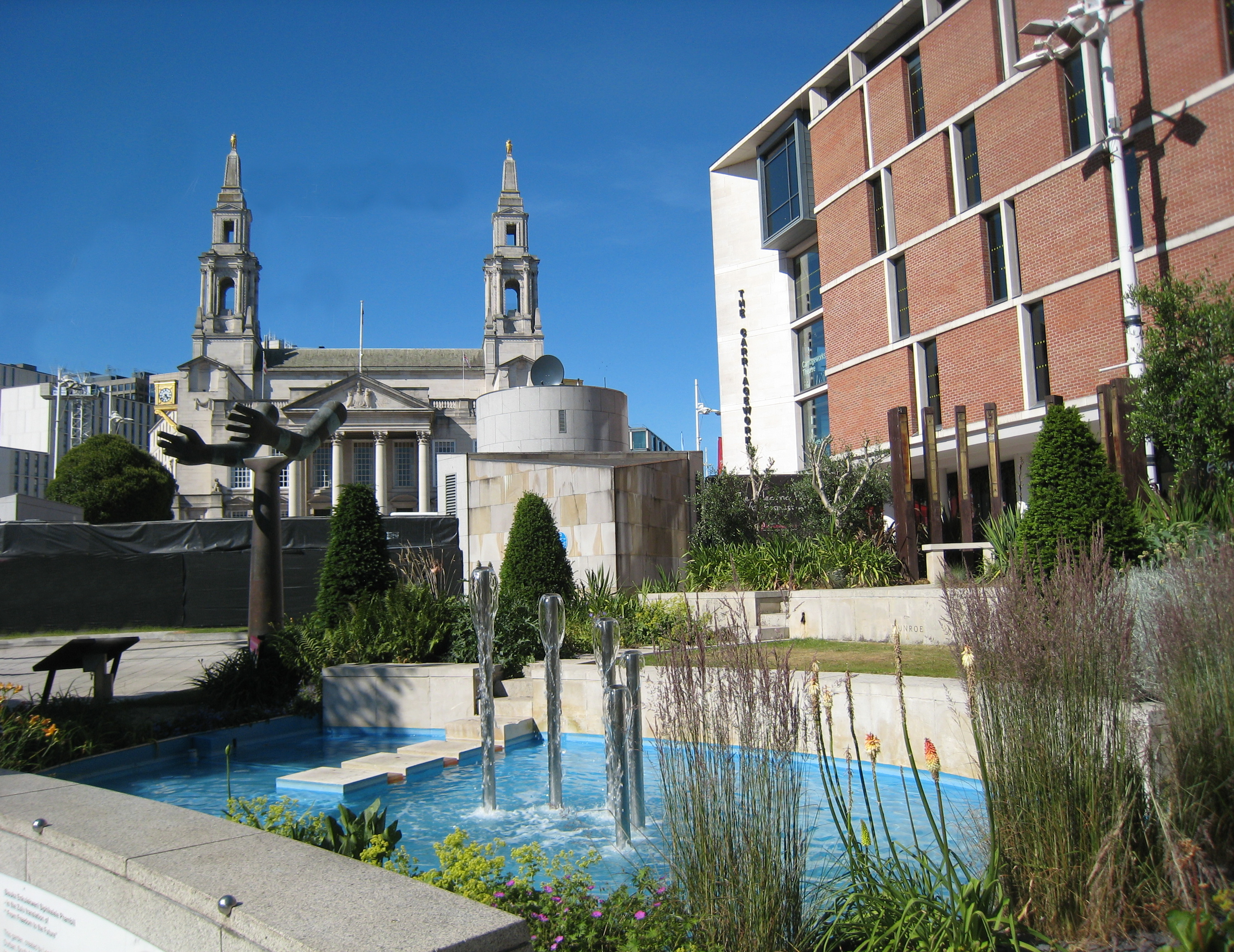
Gardens with "Both Arms" and prison bars water sculpture

Gardens in front of the Civic Hall were so named in 1983, but the present ones were newly made as part of the Millennium Square project and were re-dedicated by Nelson Mandela himself on a visit to the city in 2001. It also has the bronze sculpture "Both Arms" by Leeds sculptor Kenneth Armitage intended to represent reconciliation.

The garden was remade again in a form which won a bronze award for the Council at the 2004 Chelsea Flower Show entitled "Freedom for the Future" and installed in Leeds in 2006. This also celebrates a partnership between the cities of Leeds and Durban, South Africa. Links are demonstrated by a bronze plaque with the handprints of the Durban mayor and the leader of Leeds City Council at the time, and also a "Freedom Path" with resin blocks of footprints of both Leeds and Durban children.

There are two flower beds, one with South African plants and one with British ones. These are linked by a pathway and water feature in Portland stone which has a water sculpture representing the bars of Mandela's prison.

== History ==
When the Civic Hall was constructed in 1933 it had Calverley Street to the West and Portland Crescent to the East creating a triangle to the South, which was made into civic gardens. Demolition of older terrace housing to the East of Portland Crescent in the 1960s created space belonging to the Council used as a car park, and there were other more historic buildings for which a use was needed.

Leeds City Council prepared a proposal for a bid to combine the civic gardens and car park into Leeds's first public square for 60 years The final requirements agreed with the Millennium Commission was for an open space with all technical provisions and facilities to accommodate up to 5000 people in a variety of events. In addition there should be a quiet garden space and seating. The budget was £12 million.

Work began in 1997 by closing the street in front of the Civic Hall, and Portland Crescent going through the area. Later the part of Cookridge Street going through was also paved over, but still provides access for emergency vehicles. Phase one was completed in December 2000 in time for Millennium celebrations, with Phase 2 in April 2001, and a final cost of £12.5 million. The architect was Leeds Civic Architect John Thorp, with design assistance from Leeds City Council's in-house Design Agency and its Highway Agency. Further development of buildings around the perimeter took place until August 2008, including the conversion of the Leeds Institute building into Leeds City Museum.

In 2002, work began on £15 million development of the Electric Press printworks and adjacent buildings, followed in 2003 by construction of a new £5 million theatre next door (and integrated with the other building) to be the home of Leeds Civic Theatre, which was to move from the nearby Leeds Institute. Meanwhile, the Leeds Institute was to be converted to be the home of Leeds City Museum. However, from the beginning the cube shape of what came to be called the Carriageworks Theatre was controversial. It was described by councillors as "the most important building to be developed since the Civic Hall in the 1930s" and "a hideous insult". The theatre opened in 2005, and in 2006 hosted the annual Leeds Architecture Awards, where it won in the category for best lighting, and along with the Electric Press, the altered building award. From 2005 to 2008 work was carried out to convert the Leeds Institute into Leeds City Museum, using funds from the council, Yorkshire Forward and the Heritage Lottery Fund.

== Activities ==
As well as civic ceremonies, fairs, markets and major events on the TV screen, the site has hosted concerts by Leeds band Kaiser Chiefs and other performers including The Cribs, Meat Loaf, Embrace, Simple Minds, Ocean Colour Scene and The Bluetones.

On 30 April 2001, the former President of South Africa Nelson Mandela appeared on stage in the square to open the adjoining Mandela Gardens and was given the Freedom of the City. He famously mis-acknowledged the crowd by saying how happy he was to be in Liverpool.

On 4 June 2002 the square hosted the BBC Music Live Jubilee Party with 12 hours of music plus a beacon and fireworks to celebrate the Golden Jubilee of Elizabeth II.

=== Annual events ===
The square is used for New Year celebrations with a funfair, street entertainers and fireworks at midnight.

In January 2001, 1250 square metres of ice were used to create an ice rink, which had 24,000 visitors over a four-week period. Because of the success it was repeated the following year and is an annual feature, called the Ice Cube.

From 2002, there has been a German-style Christmas Market or Christkindlesmarkt every November and December, one of the largest in the UK.

It is used for the start and end of St Patrick's Day parade, plus music and dance.

On the first Sunday of August every year the square is host to the first part of Leeds Pride festivities and the start point of the parade of floats.

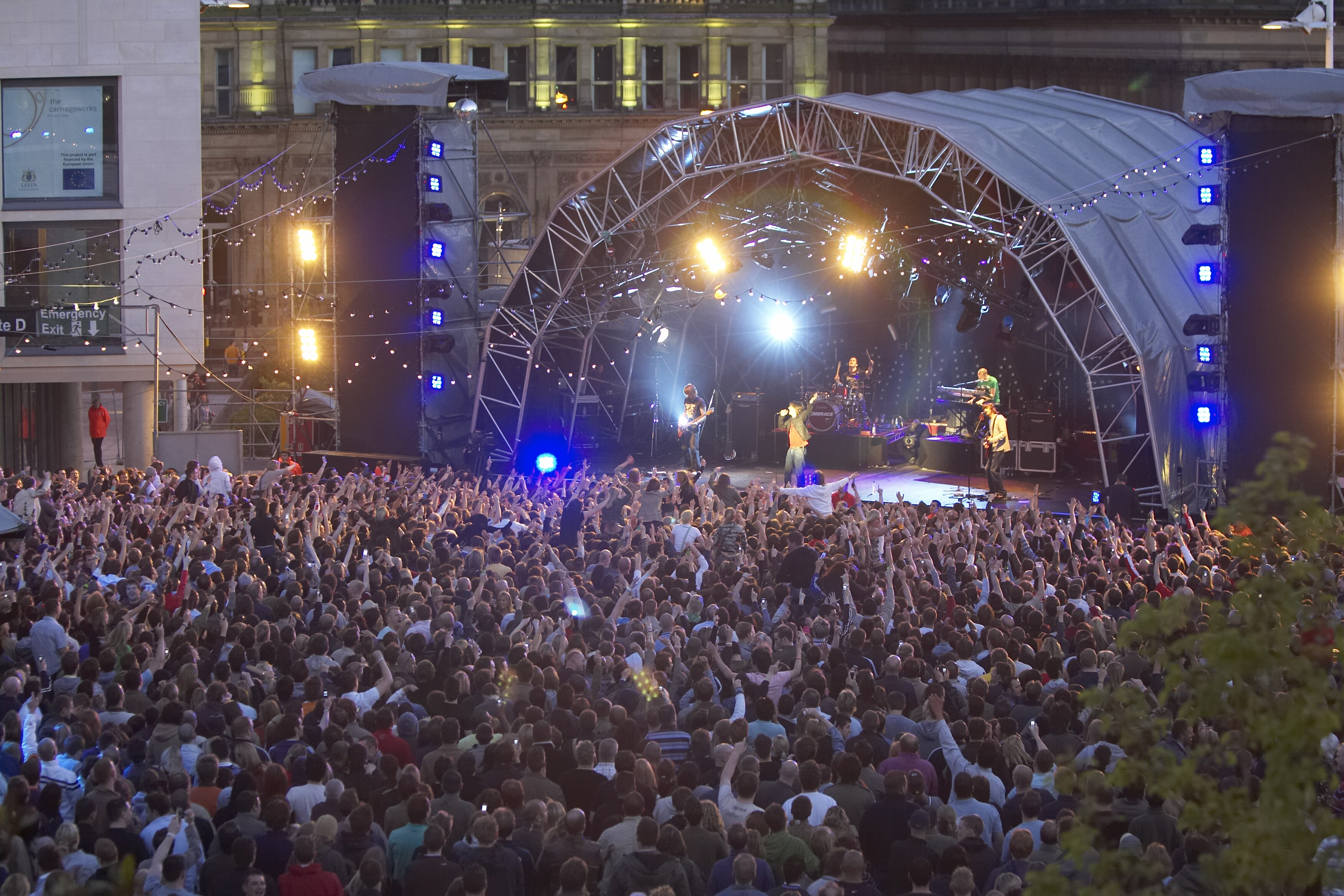
Stage performance by Embrace, 2005

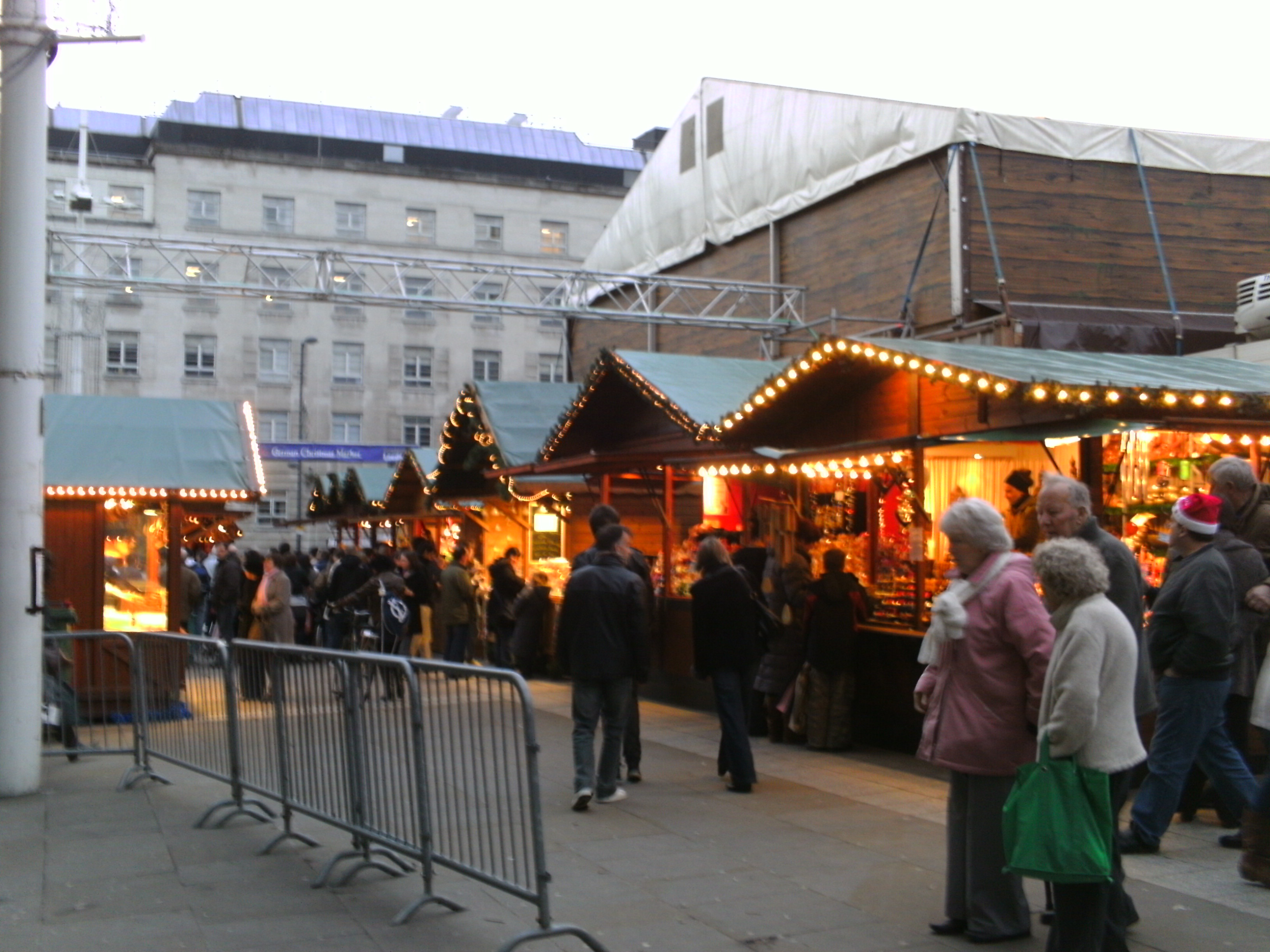
German Christmas Market, 2008

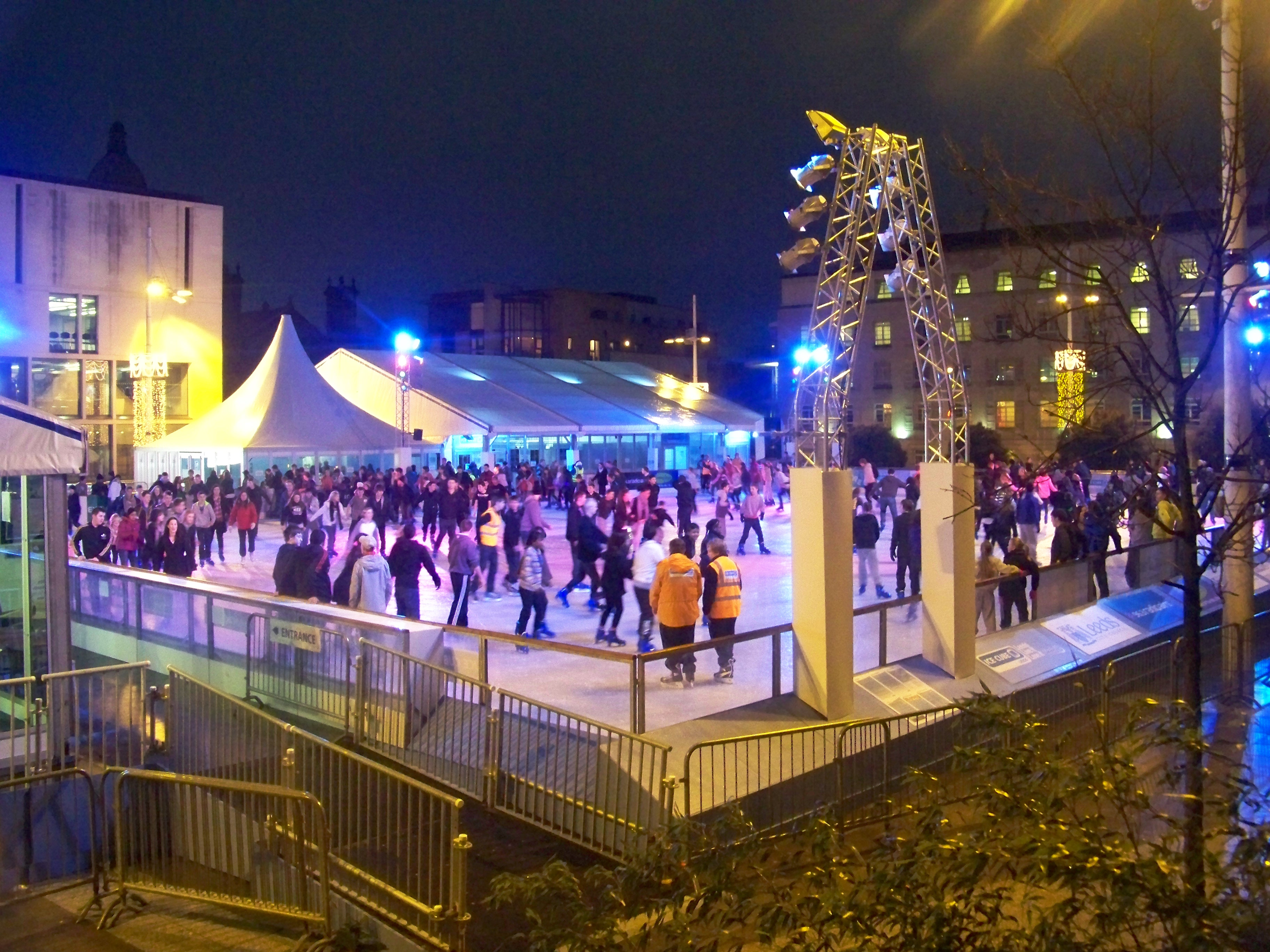
Skaters on the Ice Cube, 2010

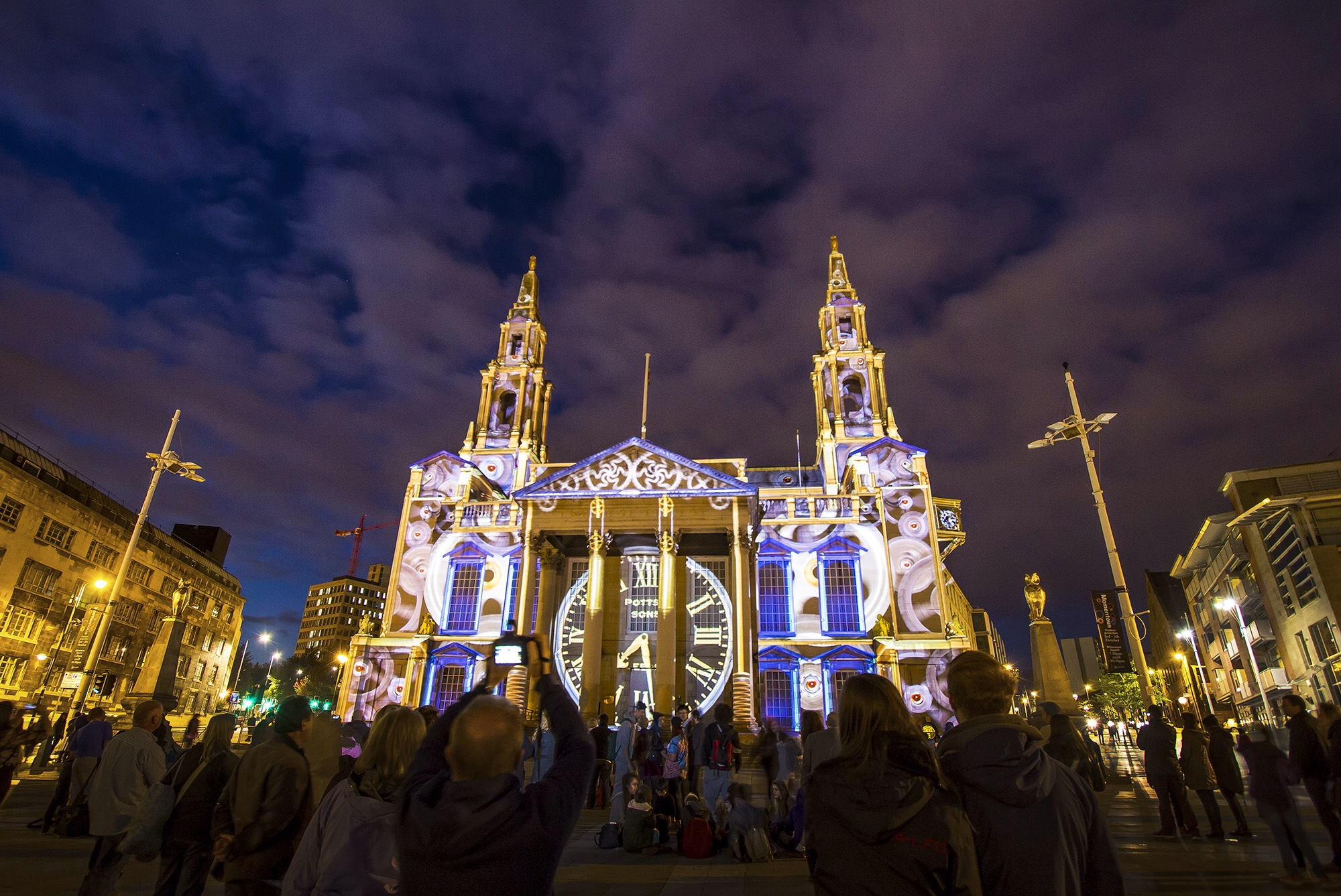
Light Night festival 2013

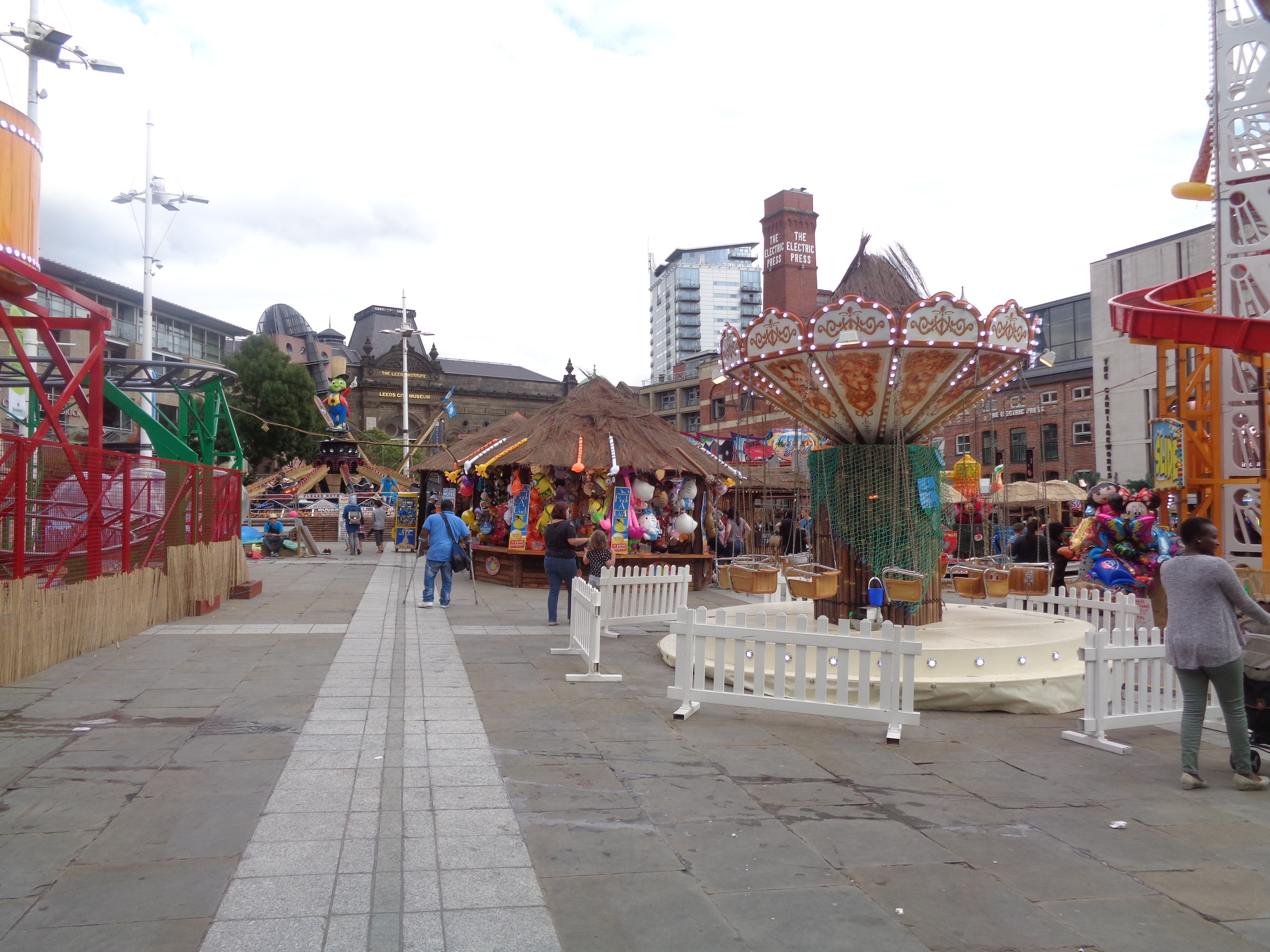
Funfair, 2015

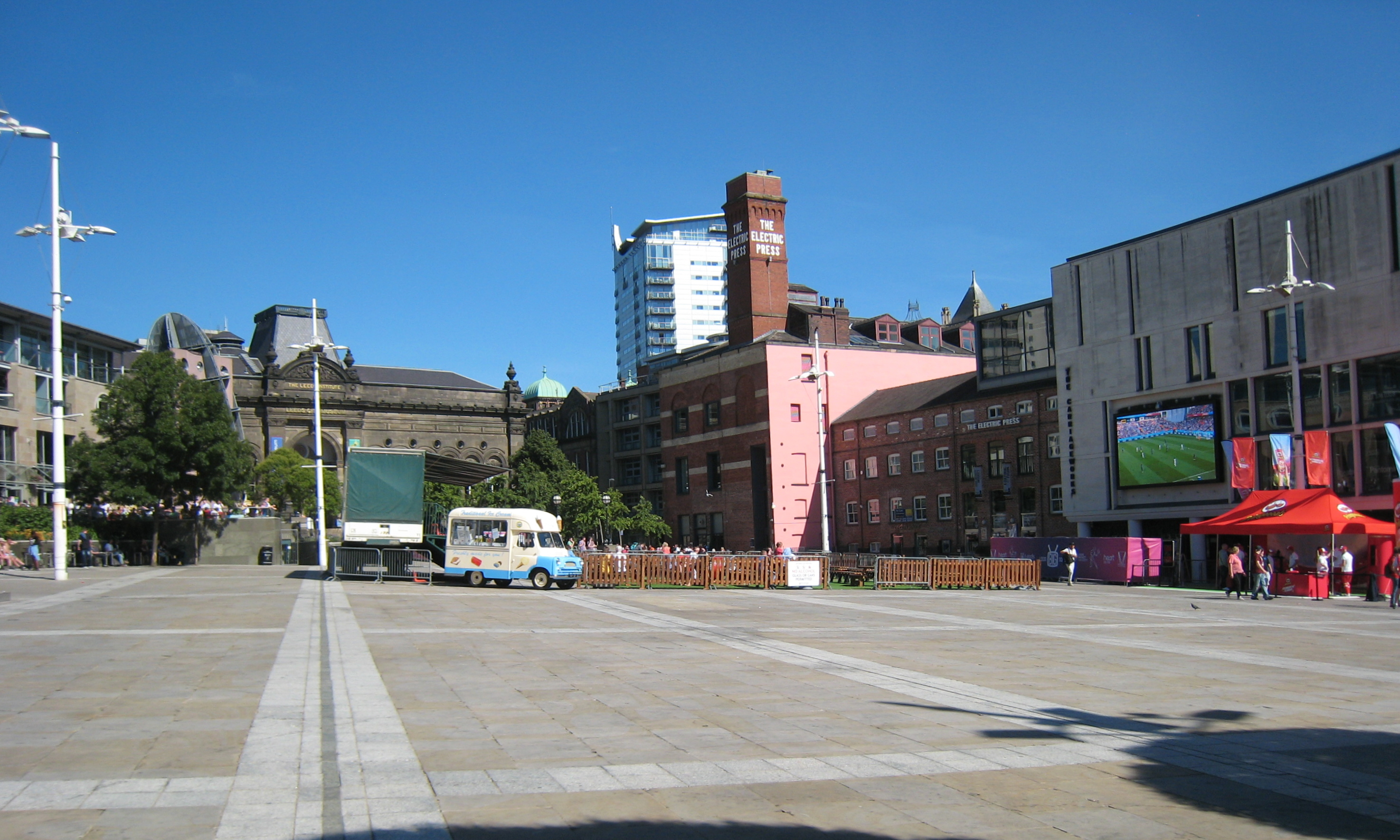
Watching the football World Cup, 2018

=== Protest ===
On 14 June 2020 thousands of people gathered peacefully in the square in a protest organised by Black Voices Matter, a coalition of organisations including Black Lives Matter Leeds, to show support for the Black Lives Matter movement.

The 11 August 2020 a very different type of event took place. Professionals from across the Events Supply Chain (including lighting designers, audio technicians, event production managers and logistics managers to name a few) came out of the shadows to draw attention to the lack of support for the supply chain. BBC Look North provided coverage of the demonstration including interviews with Neil Hunt of Zig Zag Lighting and Chris Ayre of AYRE Event Solutions both who have been severely affected by the lack of support for the industry. Nathan Clark of the Brudenell Social Club, Neil Hunt of Zig Zag Lighting and Helen Tytherleigh a freelance event professional gave speeches on how the events industry is suffering and the urgent support required. The Leeds #WeMakeEvents demonstration was held as part of a wider UK demonstration to draw attention to the urgent support required for the industry.
