= Leeds City Museum =

Museum in West Yorkshire, England

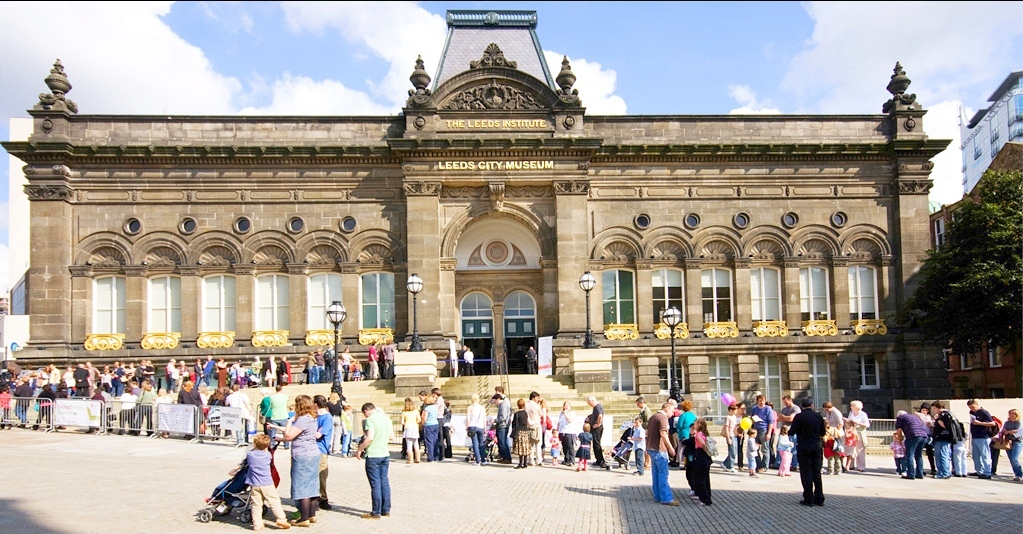
- Leeds City Museum
- Established: 1819; reopened 13 September 2008
- Location: Millennium Square, Leeds, West Yorkshire, England
- Coordinates: 53°48′06″N 01°32′49″W
- Type: Collection (museum), Heritage centre
- Public transit access: Leeds railway station, Leeds City bus station
- Website: Leeds City Museum

Leeds City Museum, established in 1819, is a museum in Leeds, West Yorkshire, England. Since 2008 it has been housed in the former Mechanics' Institute built by Cuthbert Brodrick, in Cookridge Street (now Millennium Square). It is one of eight sites in the Leeds Museums & Galleries group.

Special exhibitions are hosted alongside a collection of displays from the Leeds Archive.

== History ==
In 1819, a museum was established in Philosophical Hall, Bond Street, by the Leeds Philosophical and Literary Society, and in 1821 it opened to the public. In 1921, control of the museum was handed to the Corporation of Leeds which later became Leeds City Council. In 1862, Philosophical Hall was rebuilt in Park Row, where its stone portico can still be seen on the west side of the road. In 1941, the museum building and artifacts were badly damaged by bombing. In 1965 the museum was closed, and a few exhibits removed to a couple of rooms in the city library in 1966. The oversized Leeds Tiger, the giant moose skeleton and the carved wooden cart took up much of the space. In 1999 the museum went into storage, though researchers and the public could view items by appointment. In 2000, the resource centre at Yeadon opened, under the same appointment-to-view arrangement. In 2001, Leeds City Council bid for National Lottery cash, and in 2004, it was awarded £19.5 million, so in 2005, the Leeds Mechanics' Institute building (designed by Cuthbert Brodrick and built 1865–1868) began to be redesigned as Leeds City Museum, finally to reopen in 2008. It was redeveloped to a design by Austin-Smith:Lord architects and Buro Happold engineers. The gallery and exhibit design was provided by Redman Design.

The Mechanics' Institute had had a large hall, the Albert Hall, which seated up to 1,500 and was used for plays and concerts from the 1880s. In 1949 this became the Leeds Civic Theatre.

== The exhibits ==
While exhibits vary, they are mainly made up of exhibits from Leeds' history. The central hall has a large map of Leeds printed on the floor. There is also a scale model of the Quarry Hill flats.

=== Life on Earth gallery ===
This is the natural history gallery, featuring everything from a meteorite to dinosaur dung (coprolite). In 2019, the skeleton of a Long-finned Pilot Whale was hung from the ceiling just outside the gallery. There are several vintage taxidermy-mounts conserved by James Dickinson in 2008, including the Armley Hippo, the Leeds polar bear and the Leeds Irish Elk.

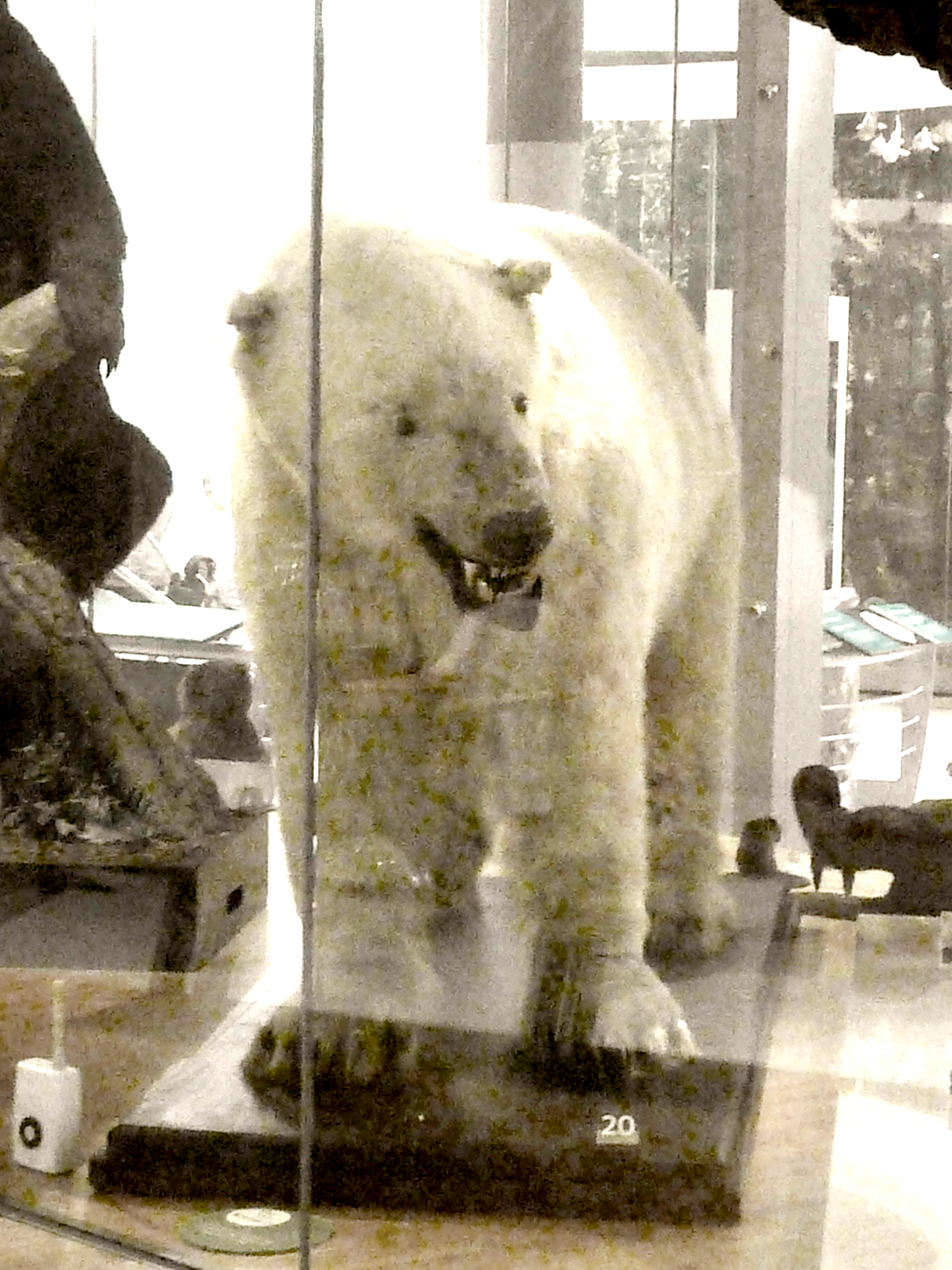
Leeds polar bear

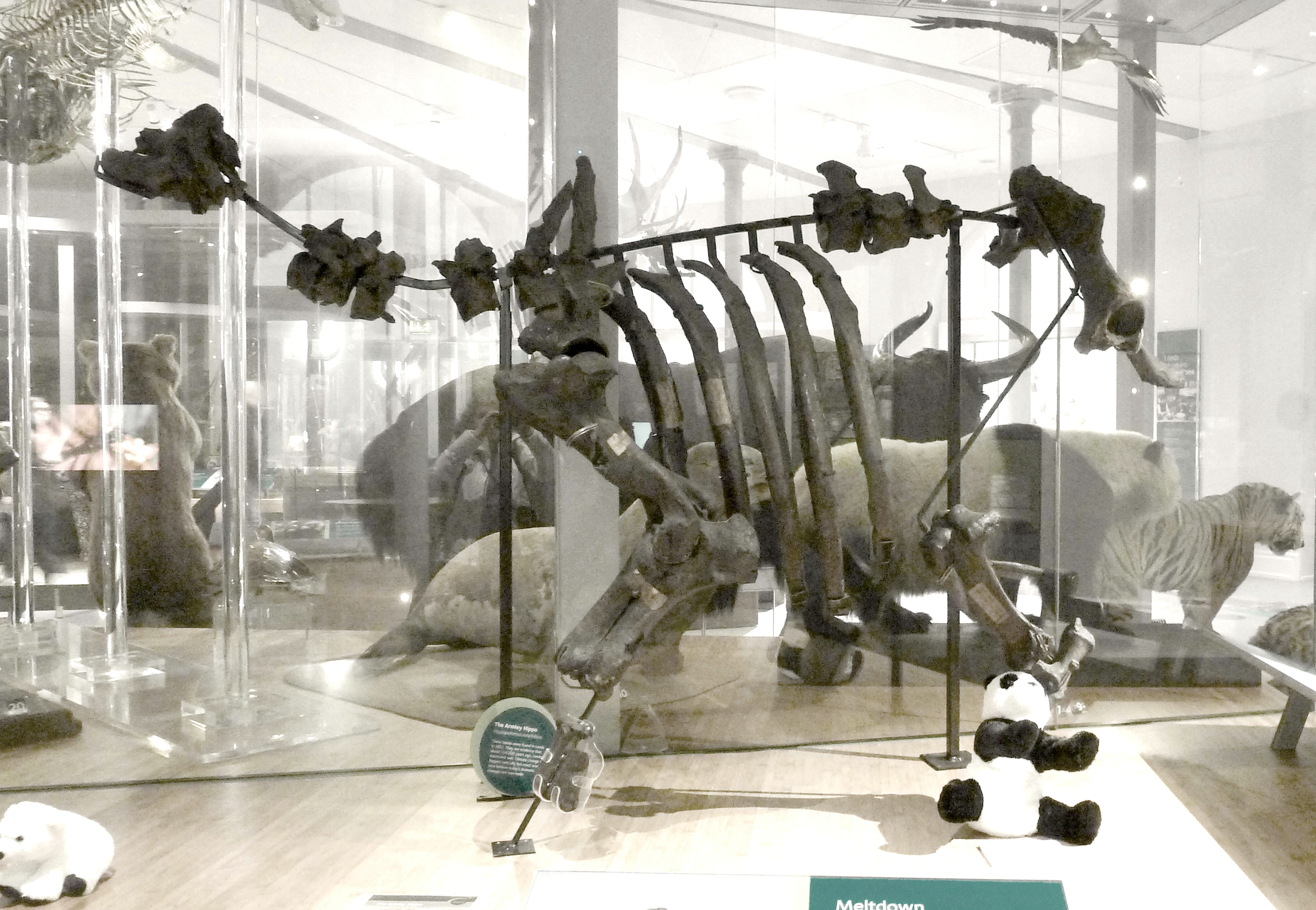
Armley Hippo

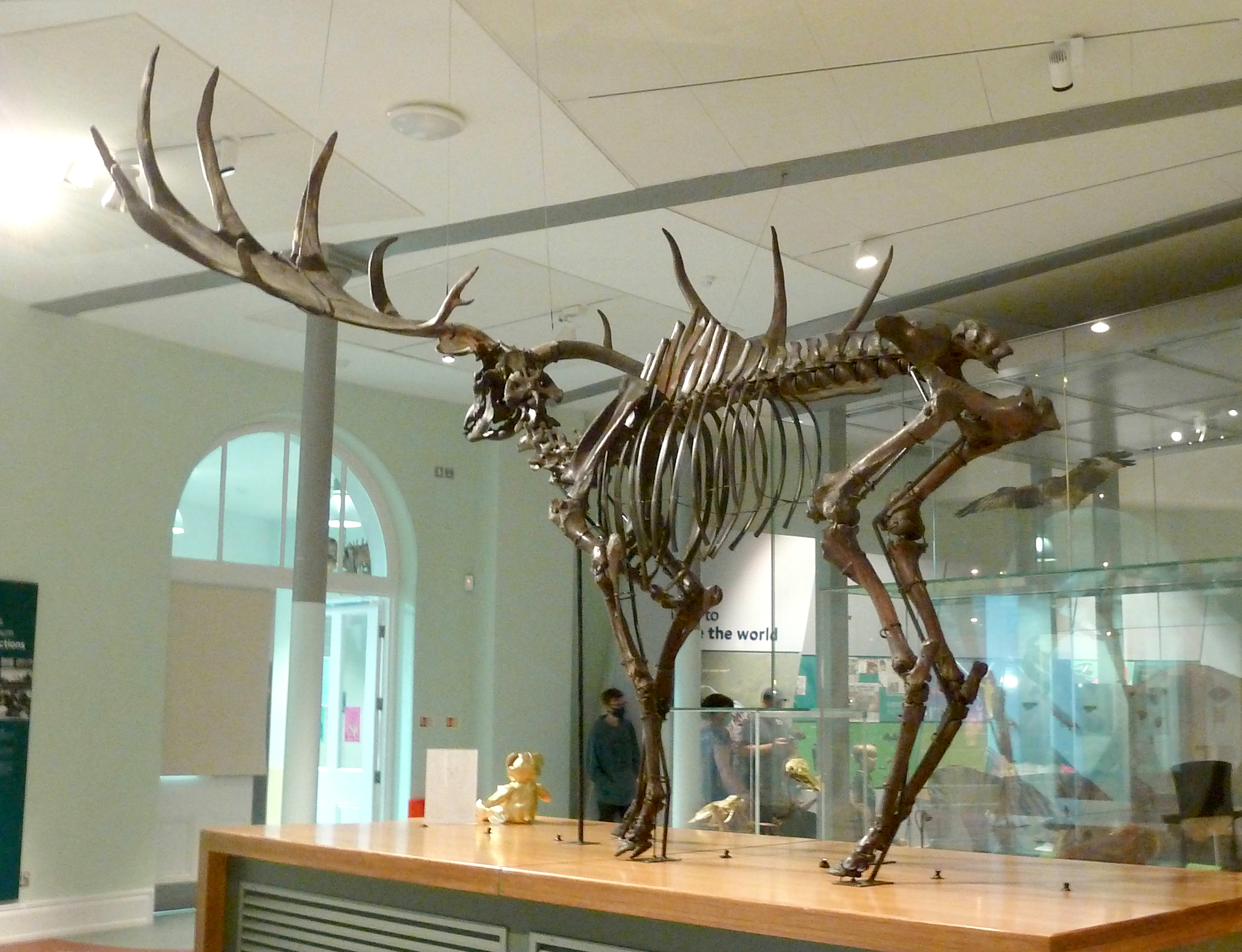
Leeds Irish Elk

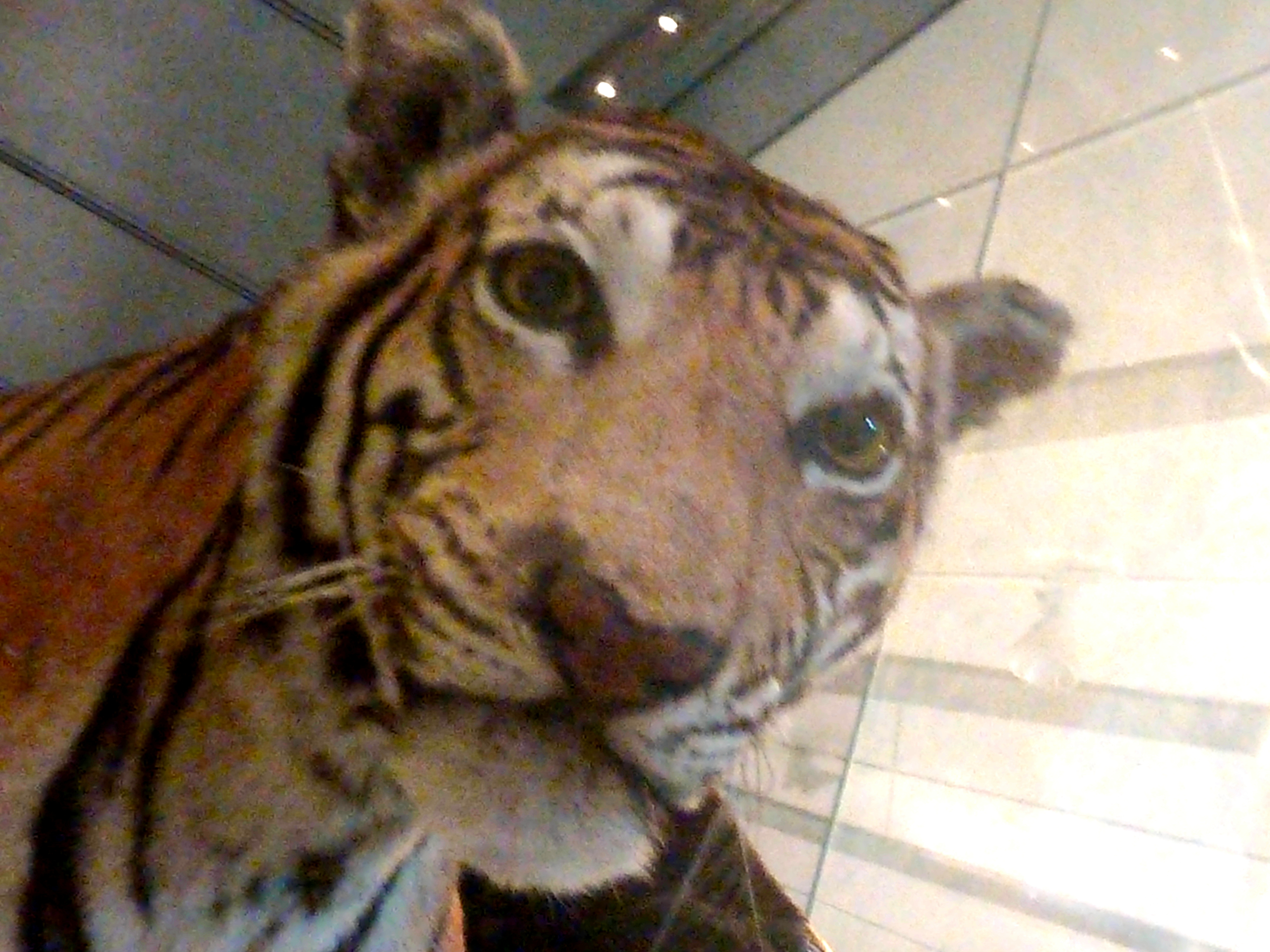
Salford tiger by Harry Ferris Brazenor, 1914

==== Leeds Tiger ====
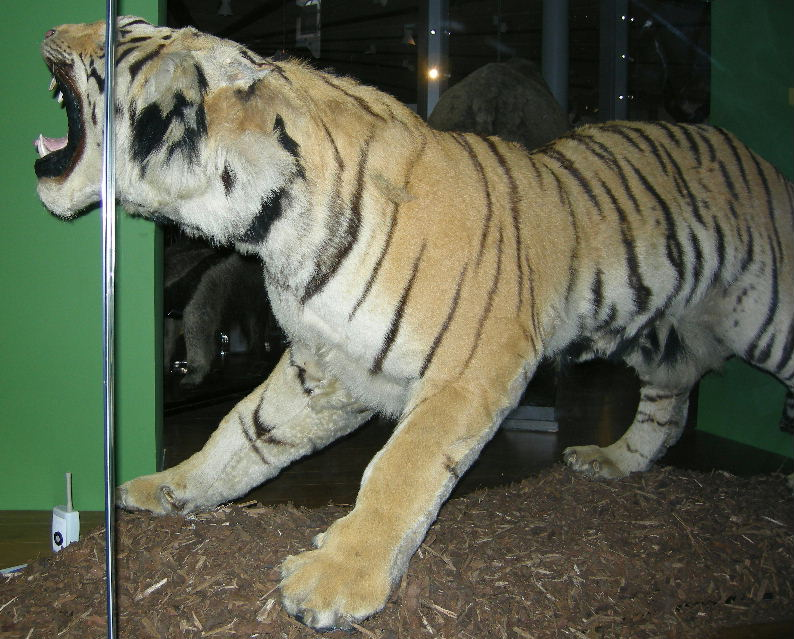
Leeds Tiger, 2009

A large, taxidermy-mounted Bengal tiger, this exhibit came to Leeds in 1862. It was shot by Colonel Charles Reid in the valley of Deyrah Dhoon near Mussoorie hill station in Uttarakhand, India in March, 1860. It was originally exhibited at the 1862 International Exhibition in London as a skin - hence its odd shape - before being turned into a taxidermy mount by Edwin Henry Ward (father of Rowland Ward). The Leeds Philosophical and Literary Society received the mounted tiger as a donation from William Gott, and it has been on display to the people of Leeds almost continuously for over 150 years.

The original tiger has been subject to various myths over the years. The Yorkshire Evening Post said, "We'll never know for certain whether the Leeds Tiger really lived up to its dangerous reputation, but today it sends a shiver down the spines of visitors to Leeds City Museum." However the pelt may now be dangerous after all, in a sense, as the Victorians will have preserved it with arsenical soap. For over a century it has sagged somewhat, as can be seen in the photograph. Nevertheless, in the early 1860s the tiger was considered an object of beauty:

The museum's curator Adrian Norris was quoted in 1979 as saying:

The tiger has always been very popular with the public, and school parties in general, and is one of the few items in the Museum we dare not remove, or cover, for fear of being swamped with complaints from members of the public, who in some cases have travelled many hundreds of miles just to see it.

=== Ancient Worlds gallery ===
Here are archaeological items from Leeds and around the world.

- Roman floor mosaic ca 250 CE, depicting she-wolf with Romulus and Remus. This was discovered at Aldborough, North Yorkshire, known to the Romans as Isurium Brigantum.
- Hellenistic Greek tomb doors ca 250 BCE. These are carved in marble, in bas relief.
- The Leeds Mummy. In the 1941 bombing raids, two other mummies were destroyed, but Nesyamun's 3000-year-old mummy survived. It is displayed in the current museum building, alongside a rather striking reconstruction of his face.
- Iron replica of Hellenistic Greek head of Aphrodite. This is a cast replica of the original 1st century BCE head in the British Museum. The original was discovered in 1872 at Satala (now Sadak) in north-eastern Turkey. The eyes were once inlaid with precious stones or paste. Apparently the top of the head was not designed to be empty, like a piece of modern art. It seems that the farmer found it when he hit the top of the head with his axe and damaged it.
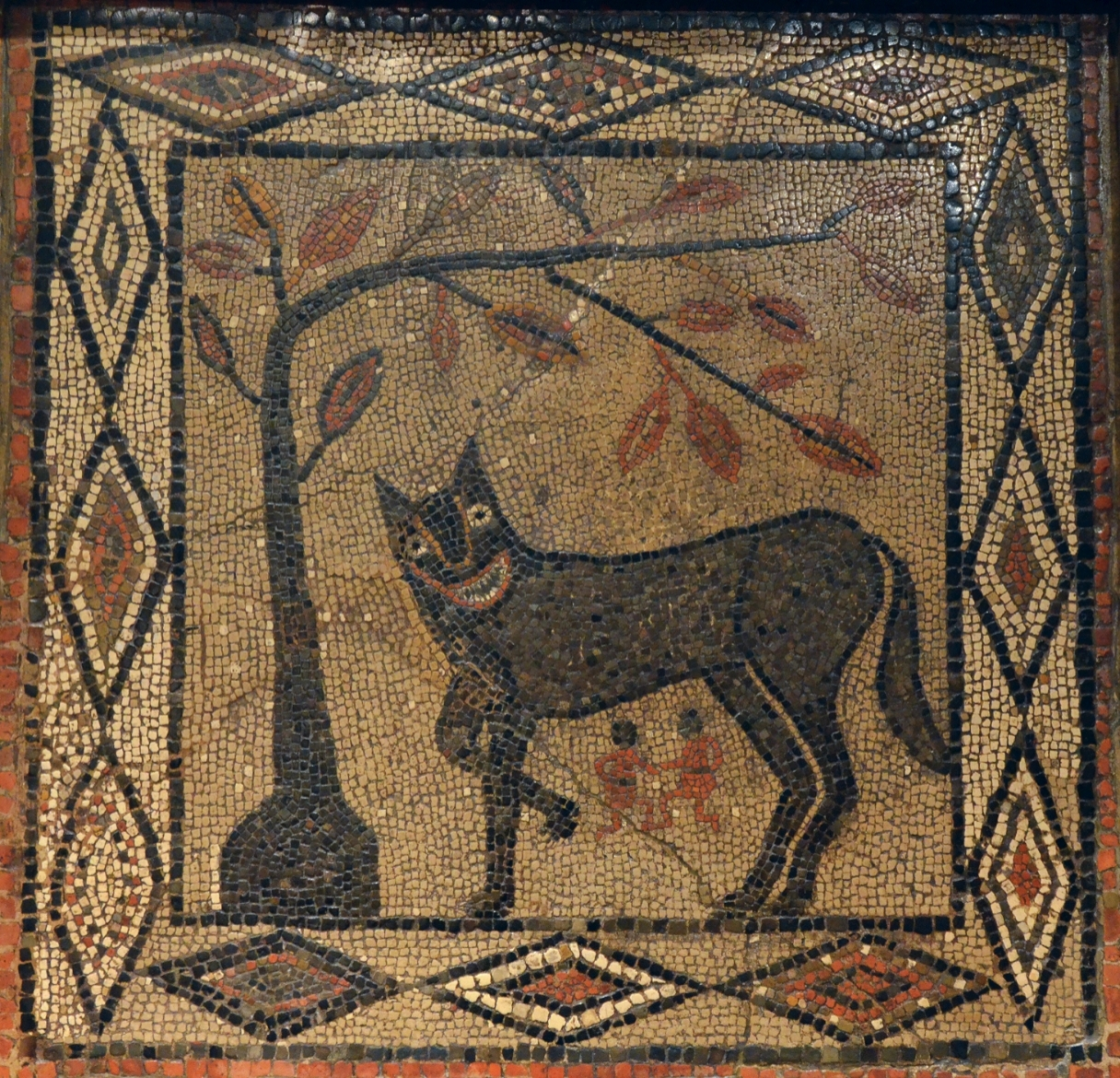
Roman floor mosaic

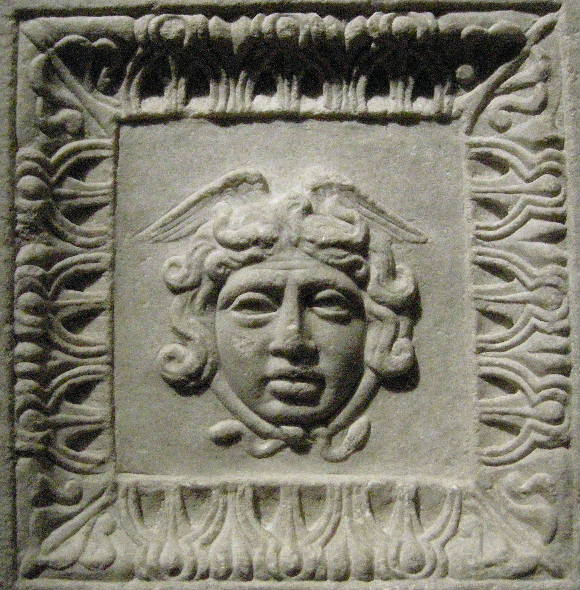
Hellenistic Greek tomb door

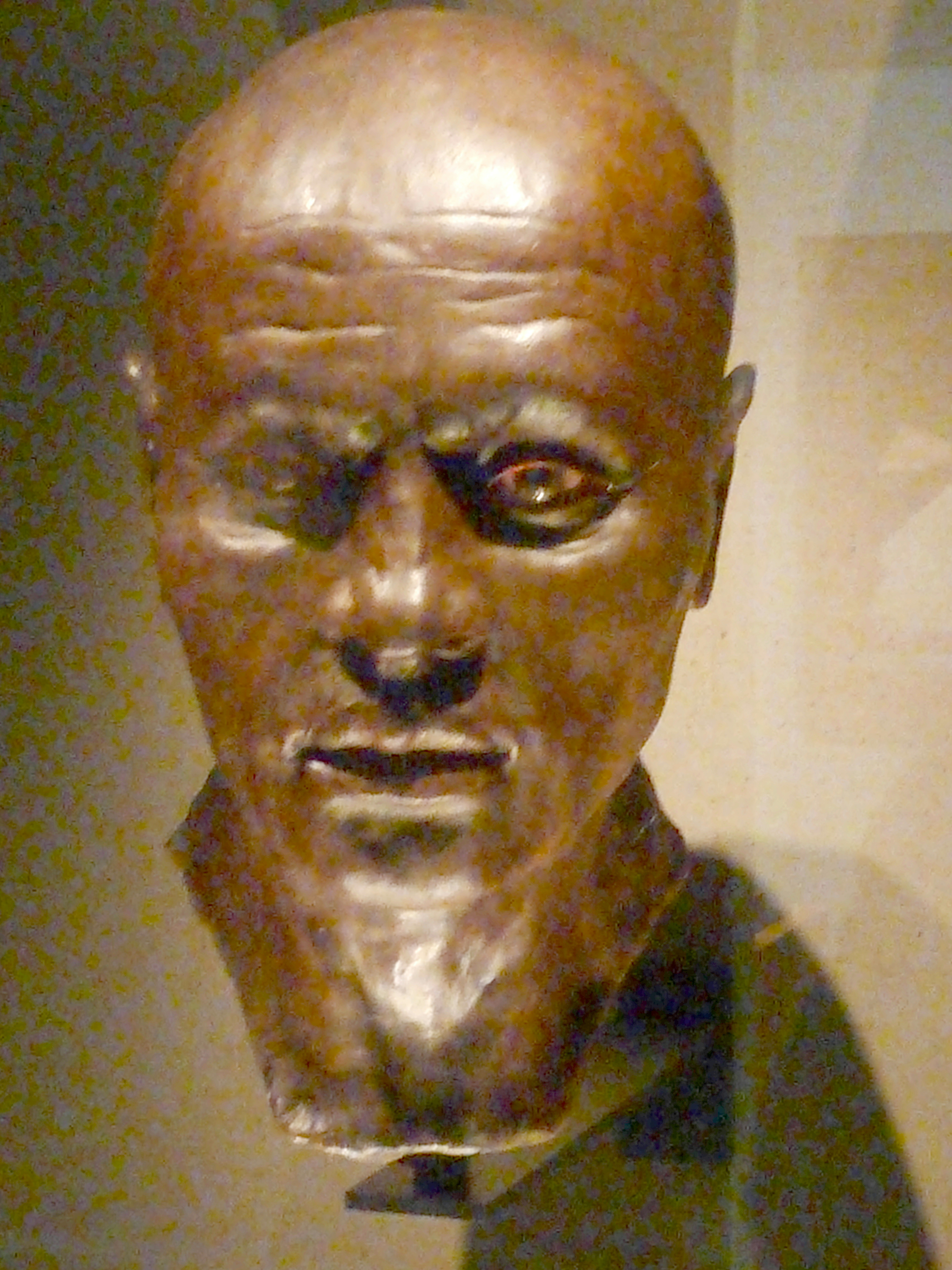
Forensic facial reconstruction of Nesyamun

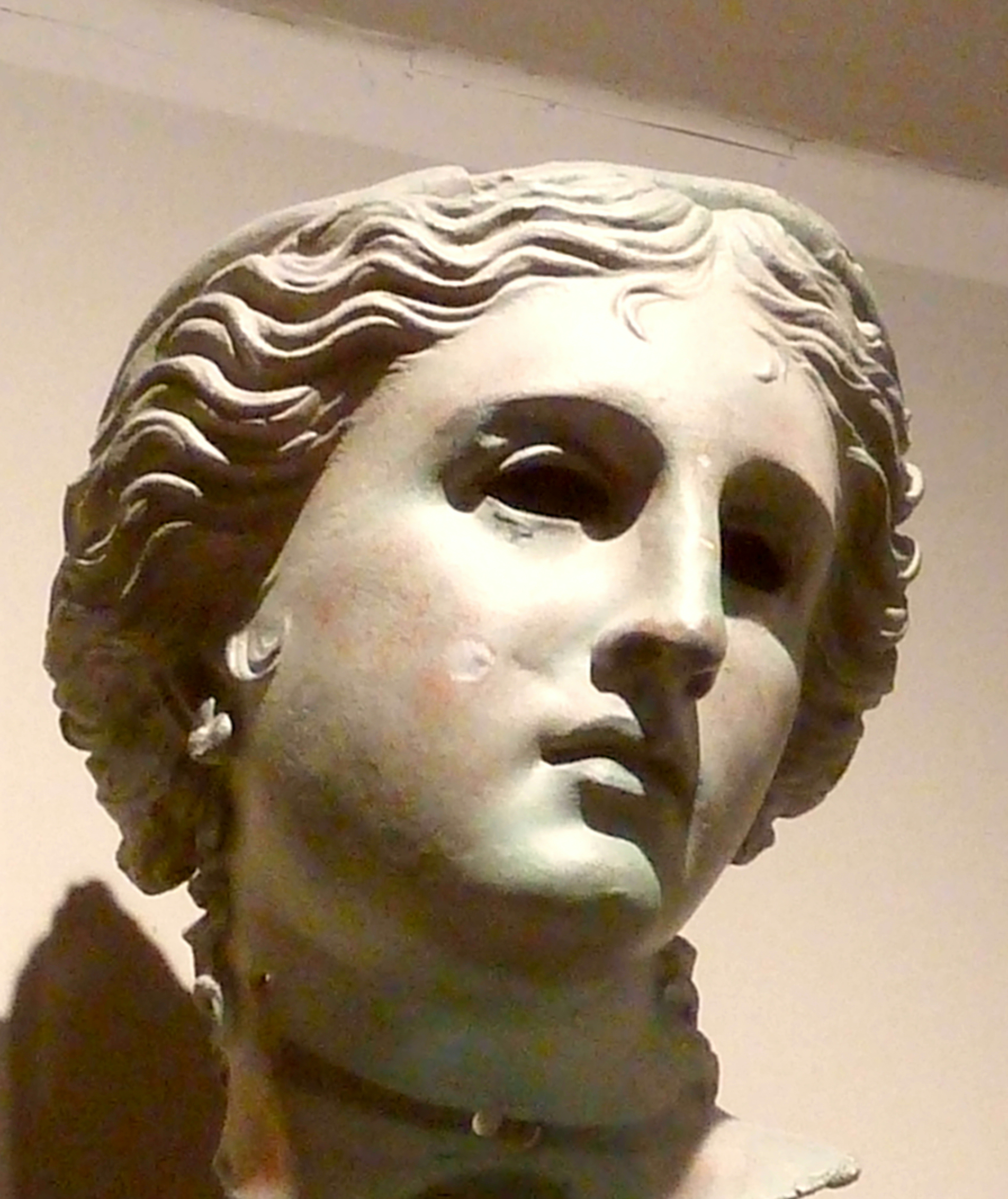
Replica of the Satala Aphrodite

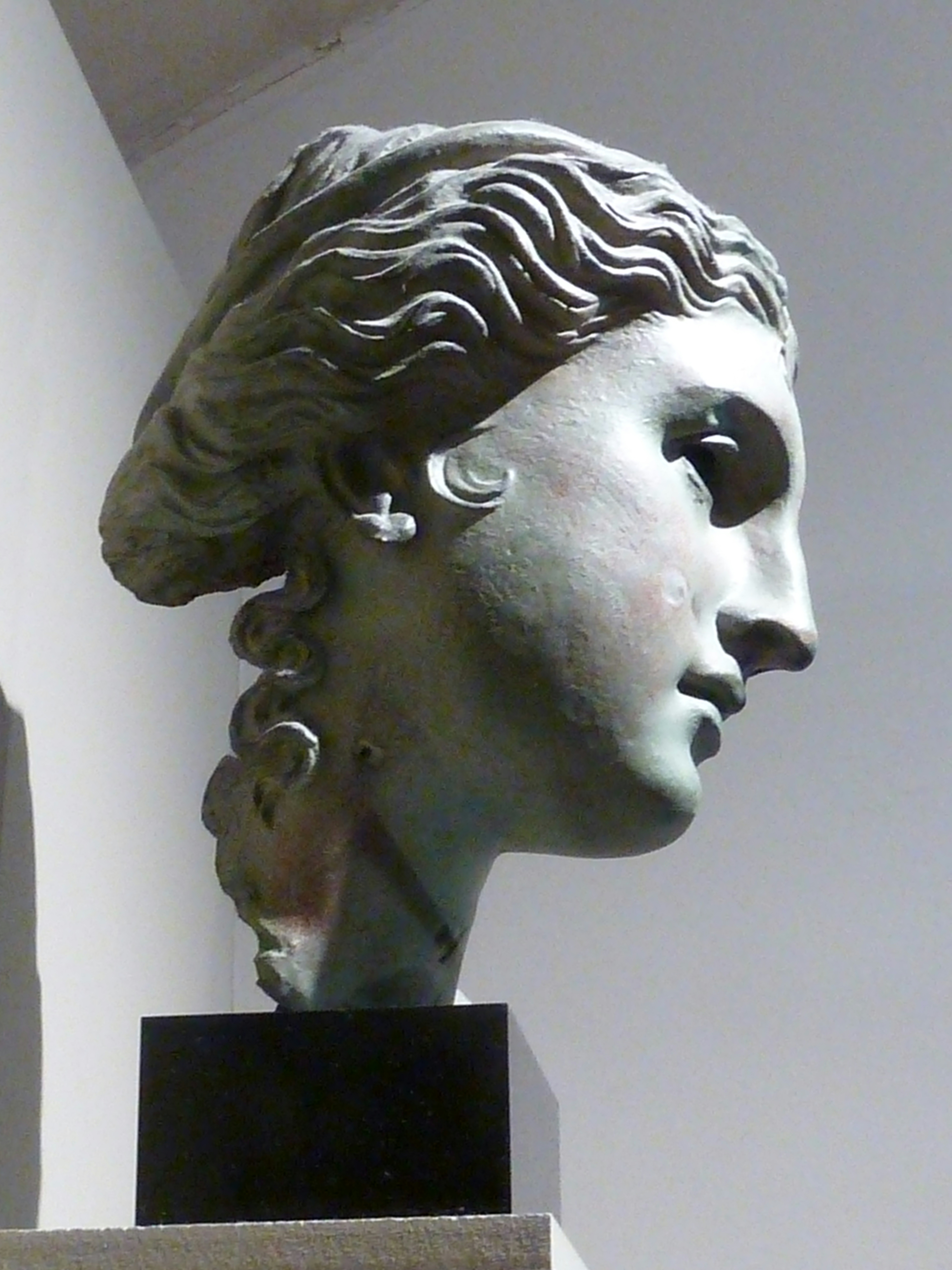
Replica of the Satala Aphrodite

=== World View gallery ===
In 2014 this gallery began hosting a long-term exhibition called 'Voices of Asia', which celebrates the sights, sounds and culture of Asian communities here in Leeds and around the world. The 'faith' element of the display regularly changes. From 2017, the focus was on Buddhism.

Leeds Museums & Galleries has large collection of objects from around the world, and Voices of Asia displays just one aspect of the city's holdings. The Leeds African collections are also significant, especially the sculpture, masks and textiles. Since 2019, most are held at Leeds Discovery Centre, which holds representations of North American beadwork, European folk items and the traditional arts of Oceania.

=== Leeds Story gallery ===
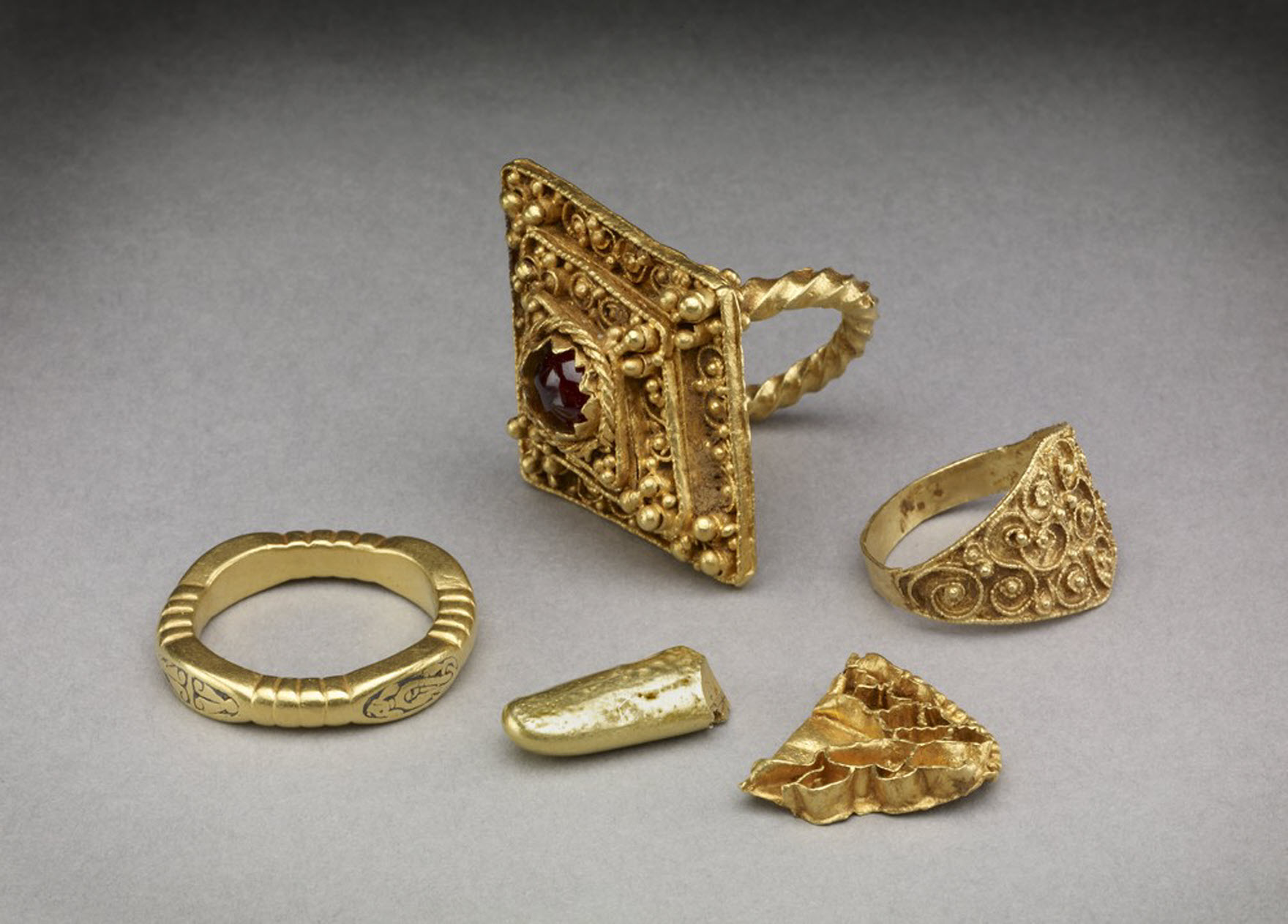
Hoard of Anglo-Saxon rings

The history of Leeds from prehistory to the modern day. One of the key objects on display is the Malham Pipe. Originally identified as an Iron Age flute made from bone, its dating was revised in 2018 by Sermon and Todd in Northern History to the early medieval period, but a 2026 article by Sermon and Lord in the same journal suggests that the pipe may be Anglo Saxon or early medieval. The West Yorkshire Hoard is an example of one aspect of medieval Leeds.

=== Special exhibitions ===
On the third floor is a gallery space dedicated to a changing exhibition programme. One previous exhibition was 'Beavers to Weavers' looking at things created by creatures.

=== Collectors Cabinet ===
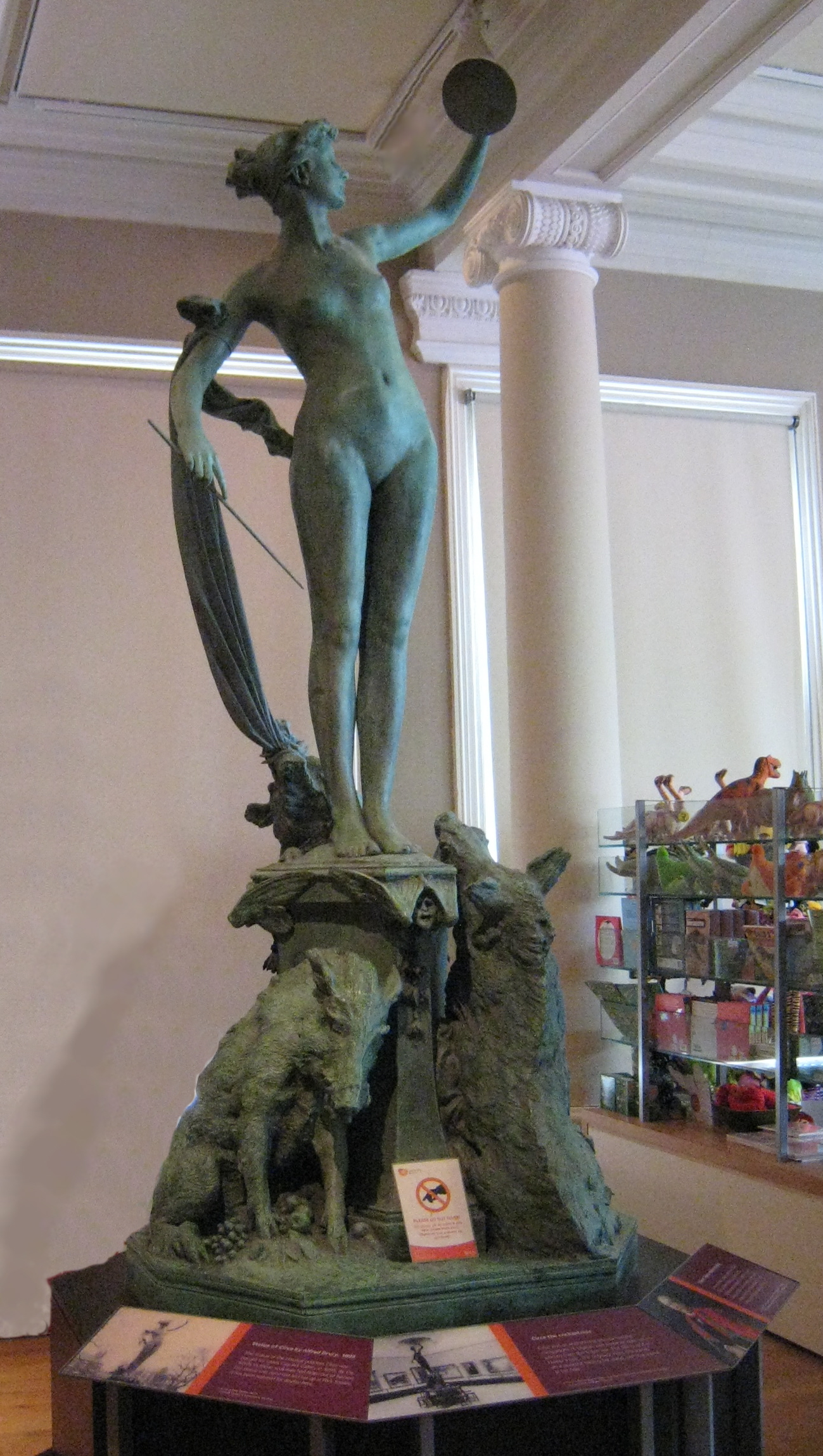
Circe, by Alfred Drury

Various collections appear here in rotation with a focus on the people behind the objects.

- The Circe bronze by Alfred Drury. This was commissioned from Drury in 1894 by Leeds Art Gallery. It was displaced to Park Square in the 1950s when Victorian art went out of fashion. It was weathered and damaged, but has been restored recently. It was Drury who made the eight bronze lampholder girls in Leeds City Square, plus the bronze of Joseph Priestley nearby.

== Associated curators ==
- Henry Denny
- Elizabeth Pirie
- Violet Crowther

== See also ==
- Grade II* listed buildings in Leeds
- Listed buildings in Leeds (City and Hunslet Ward - northern area)
