= Armley Hippo =

Partial hippopotamus skeleton discovered in Leeds, England

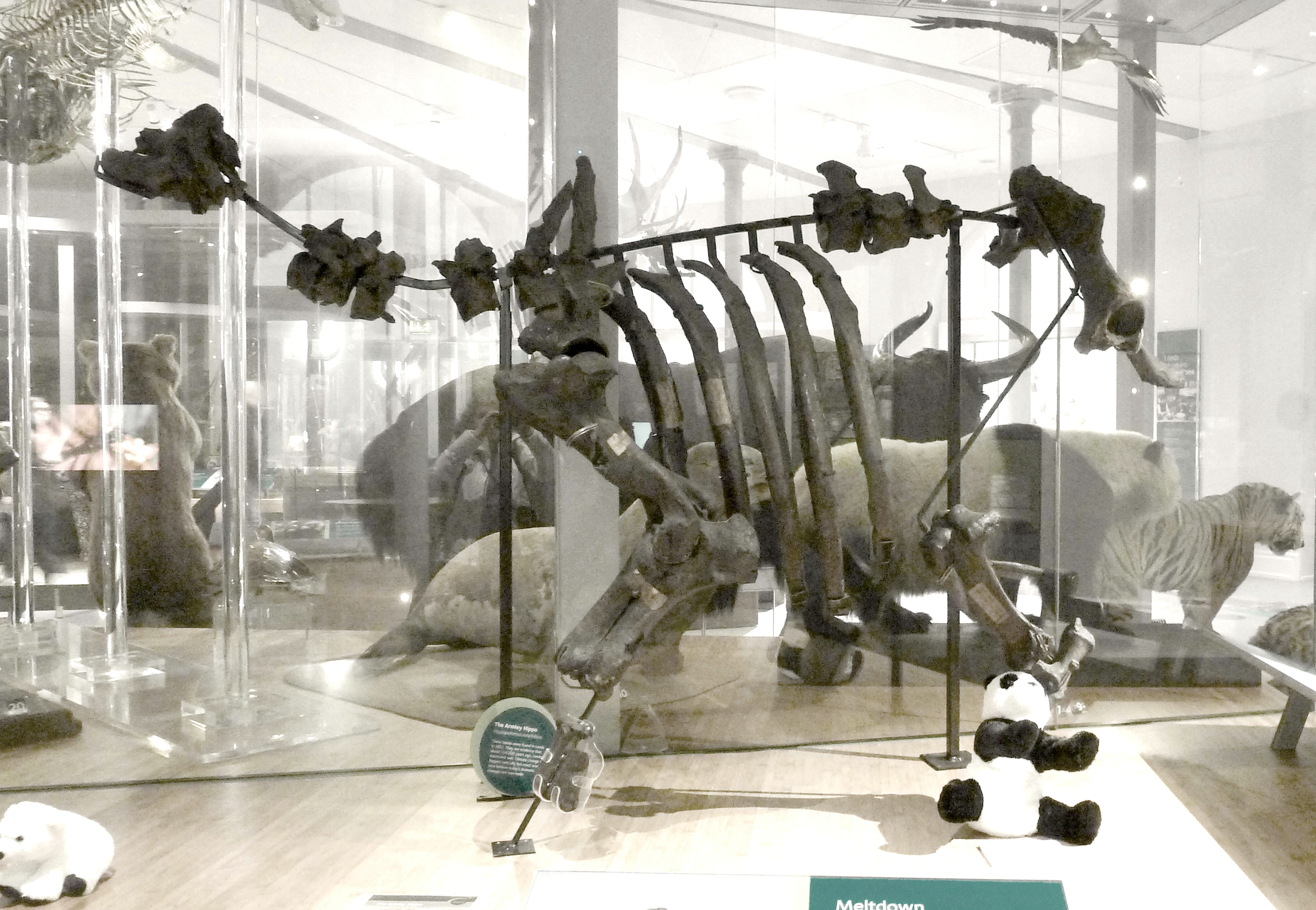
- Displayed at Leeds City Museum
- Common name: Armley Hippo
- Species: Hippopotamus amphibius
- Age: 130,000 to 115,000 years (Last Interglacial/Ipswichian)
- Place discovered: Armley, England, United Kingdom
- Date discovered: 1851–1852
- Discovered by: Brick pit workmen

The Armley Hippo, previously known as the Leeds Hippopotamus, is a partial skeleton of a common hippopotamus (Hippopotamus amphibius) consisting of 122 bones, of which 25 were mounted in 2008 by James Dickinson for display at Leeds City Museum in Leeds, West Yorkshire, England. The skeleton dates to the Last Interglacial (also known as the Eemian and the Ipswichian in Britain) around 130,000 to 115,000 years ago. This period is known for finds of hippopotamus across England and Wales.

The bones were discovered between 1851 and 1852 by workmen digging clay at Longley's brickfield in Wortley, Leeds (now Armley). Astonished at the size of the remains, they brought the larger bones to Henry Denny, the curator at the Leeds Philosophical Society's former museum in Park Row, Leeds. Denny visited the brickfield and retrieved many more bones, although some of the smaller bones had been lost. The remains discovered at the site in 1851 included parts of four hippopotami (including the Armley Hippo), a woolly mammoth and an aurochs. In 1852, the bones of two more hippopotami were found there.

The discovery impressed the antiquarians of the Victorian era, because it was rare to find remains of the hippopotamus so far north in the world, and because Leeds Museum was "probably now in possession of the most extensive series of hippopotamic remains of any provincial museum in the kingdom". The Armley Hippo skeleton has long captured the public imagination. It has been on display, first as a pile of bones, and then as a mount, in various museum locations in Leeds since it was discovered. In the 19th century, it was the subject of lectures and papers and is still sometimes the subject of newspaper articles. Today it is often used as an educational tool. "For generations it’s been the city’s most famous prehistoric peculiarity".

== Discovery location ==
=== First find ===
The "massive" fossil bones of the Armley Hippo, previously known as the Leeds Hippopotamus, were discovered in 1851 by Longley's Brickfield workmen digging clay in Wortley (now Armley), West Riding of Yorkshire, England. (The Armley Gyratory and a British Gas depot have since been built on the site.) Alongside this skeleton were found the bones of an "aged" hippo with two young ones, an "elephant" later confirmed to be a woolly mammoth, and an aurochs: "huge bones, so large that they thought they could not be Christians' bones".

Most of the smaller bones were destroyed, lost or "disregarded", before the bigger bones were exhumed. However the men brought the large bones to Henry Denny, the curator of the former Leeds Museum in the Philosophical Hall, Park Row, Leeds. Denny "visited the site daily and collected many specimens by his own endeavours and stimulated the men by the promise of pecuniary reward to increased care and search". His notes included "additional documentation suggesting a Horse and Bear material".

=== Second find ===
In April 1852, more hippopotamus bones were found in the same brickfield:

[The find] consisted of two specimens of the great northern hippopotamus in a brick earth, the property of Messrs Longley, of this town, who, in the same praiseworthy manner, presented a few bones to the museum, and which by this means is probably now in possession of the most extensive series of hippopotamic remains of any provincial museum in the kingdom.

=== Significance of the find location ===
In 1852, a theory was proposed that the River Aire was formerly located in a channel south of its present course through Armley, because prehistoric mammal bones (such as the Armley Hippo) had been found in that ancient channel:

The former course of the River Aire was much more to the south than at present; that it was probably of greater width, and conveyed a vast torrent of water which flowed from the more mountainous districts of the county (before it was diverted into various channels by the hand of man), together with the animals and trees which happened to impede its progress, or were washed from its banks. This has been satisfactorily shown by the bones of deer, oxen &c., which have from time to time been exhumed, associated with alluvia, gravel, boulders and sand.

On 3 May 1854, at a meeting of the Yorkshire Naturalists' Club in York, Edward Charlesworth gave a talk which referenced the Armley Hippo, whose bones he had brought with him.

[Charlesworth] now had the opportunity of exhibiting these vary valuable and remarkable remains. Considering the large number of bones found, and the unusually perfect state in which they had been disinterred, this discovery Mr Charlesworth considered to be the most remarkable of the kind that had ever occurred in this country ... the cavern at Kirkdale with its numerous remains of huge Hyenas, was well known ... and at the farm called Bielbeck, near Market Weighton, was another celebrated locality for fossil bones of the extinct Elephant and other large quadrupeds ... The Museum of the Yorkshire Philosophical Society possessed large collections from both these localities, but no remains of the Hippopotamus were found at Beil-beck Farm, and very few in the cavern at Kirkdale. Indeed, so rare are the remains of this animal in the fossil state, that the bones found at Leeds probably equal in number the united collections of all the other Museums in the kingdom.

Theories developed as to how the Armley Hippo reached Yorkshire. In 1907 John Booth MSA FSSc, writing in the Shipley Times, described the idea that ...:

... the British Islands [were once] part of a European continent then connected with Africa, and across which huge extinct lions, tigers, bears, elephants, and rhinoceroses roamed and left their remains in the caves of the limestone districts and the sands and gravels of rivers when they flowed 100 ft (30 m) or more above their present level. During this period a southern fauna, even the hippopotamus, found their way as far north as Yorkshire, testifying to the existence of great rivers flowing from the south across this Quaternary continent.

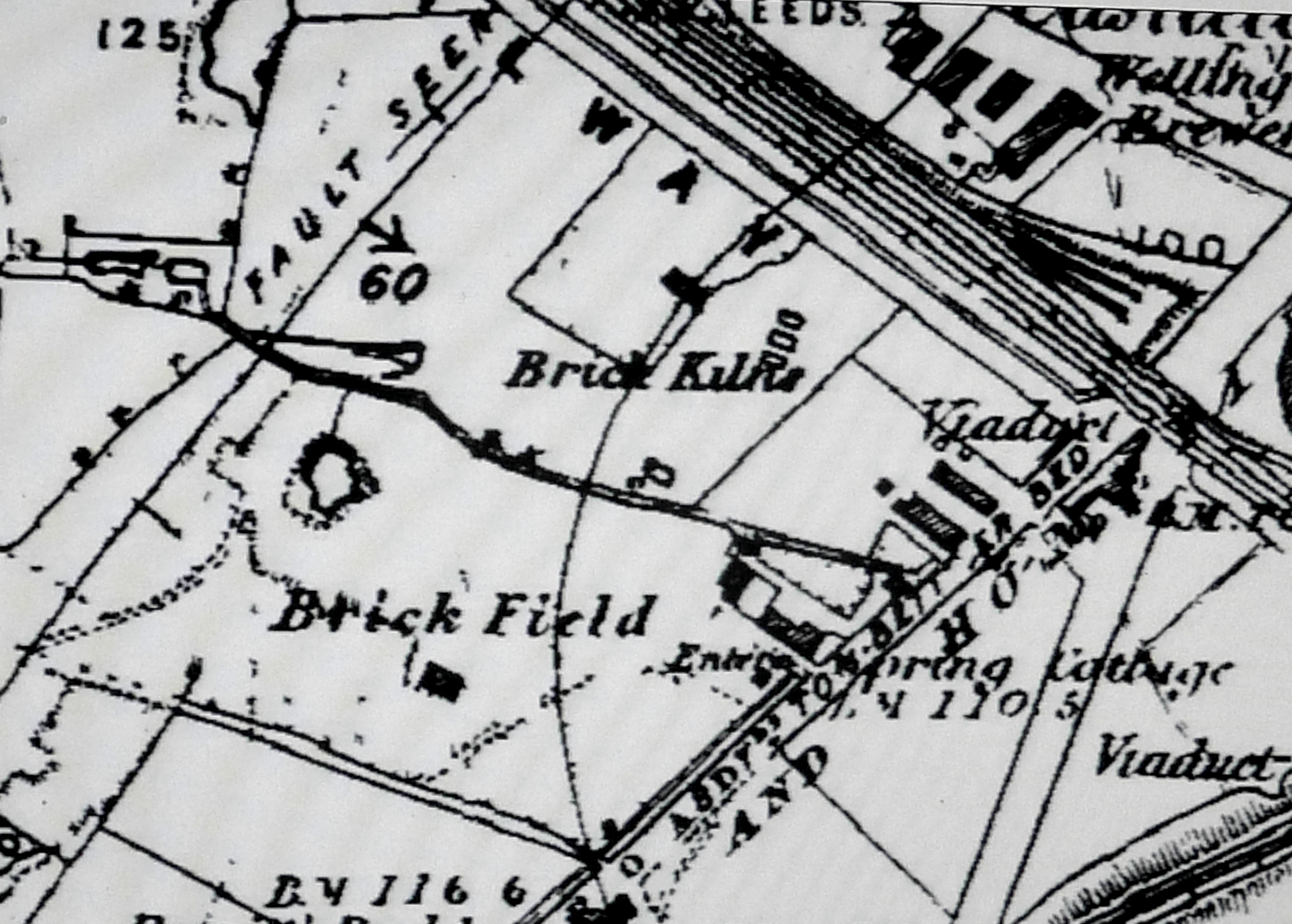
Contemporary map showing 1851 discovery site

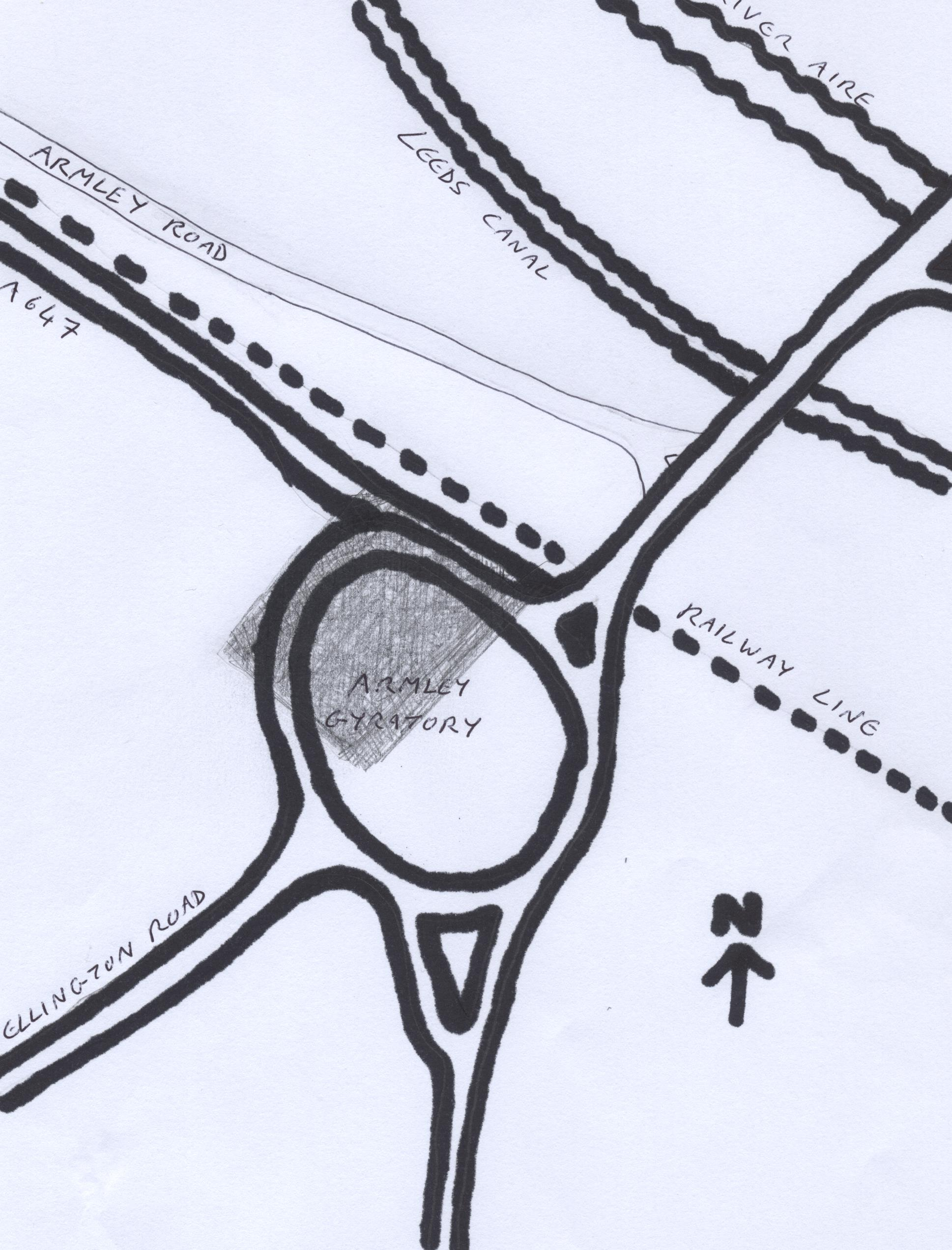
The same site (shaded) today, under the Armley Gyratory

== Description ==
The bones were accessioned in 1851 (first find) and 1852 (second find). (Note: The Armley Hippo fossil skeleton forms part of the Leeds City Museum's Pleistocene mammal collection; accession number Leedm. B.1852.05.001-122) Henry Denny "gathered numerous bones and teeth which enabled him to identify" the Armley Hippo skeleton as an example of the subspecies known as the great northern hippopotamus, or Hippopotamus amphibius, which "flourished over 100,000 years ago" and has long been extinct in the UK. In 1853 Denny read a paper on the hippopotamus discovery at a meeting of the British Association for the Advancement of Science in Hull.

Besides the head, only the left half of the skeleton, consisting of 25 bones, has been mounted for museum display. The remainder of the Armley Hippo's 122 bones are kept in the museum's archives. It is rare to find such a large proportion of an ancient hippopotamus skeleton in the UK, it being more common to find just a few bones. The Armley Hippo is among the most northern British specimens, the northernmost being from Stockton-on-Tees in County Durham. "For generations it’s been the city’s most famous prehistoric peculiarity".

=== Dating the bones ===
For a long time there was some question as to the dating of the bones:

There have always been concerns about the dating of these bones. Denny recorded that they were all discovered within a small area and that some were still articulated. He concluded that the bodies had not travelled far after death. A workman told T. P. Teale, who went to the site with Denny, that querns had been found in an adjoining field at about the same level. He wrote a paper suggesting that the animals were alive after the last glaciation and possibly during Roman times. (Note: Thomas Pridgin Teale (1800–1867), FRS, a surgeon, was president of the Leeds Philosophical Society in the 1860s)

Historically the bones were difficult to date due to a gelatine coating which had been added, probably at the time of discovery. More recently, a molar sample from the skeleton was more precisely dated to 130,000–113,000 (or 130,000–117,000) years ago – during the Last Interglacial (Ipswichian) period when a warm climate suited the hippopotamus. Hippopotamuses are now known to have intermittently inhabited Britain during warm interglacial periods as early as 1 million years ago. They are particularly well known from the Last Interglacial, where over 35 localities have been reported across England and Wales. At present, no humans are thought to have inhabited Britain during the Last Interglacial, contrary to an 1878 report of hippo remains being found alongside human artefacts in Victoria Cave near Settle, North Yorkshire, which are now known to originate from different time periods.

== Mount and display ==
The larger bones were originally displayed unmounted on tables, as for example in 1853 at the Leeds Philosophical Society's annual conversazione. In 1862, when the museum was rehoused in the extended Philosophical Hall in Park Row, it was planned to display as many different mammals as possible in the same area, to facilitate public understanding of Linnaean taxonomy. Professor Richard Owen gave the inaugural speech at the opening of this extension, in which he expounded on this plan, which included the bones of the Armley Hippo.

In 2008, 25 bones of the skeleton were taxidermy-mounted by James Dickinson, and the exhibit has since been displayed at Leeds City Museum. Brian Selby of Leeds City Council said:

It’s extraordinary to think that Leeds was once home to animals like hippos and hard to imagine how different the world must have been at that time. We’re very lucky to have a specimen like this on display here in Leeds, which gives us a glimpse into a bygone age and brings home just how much history we have all around us.

In May 2022, the skull of another ancient hippopotamus, donated to Leeds Museum from Salford Museum in 1982, was the subject of a BBC news article. Following preparations for its display, it was discovered that one of the teeth had gone missing amongst specimens held in Leeds City Museum. The skull is to be displayed alongside the Armley Hippo.

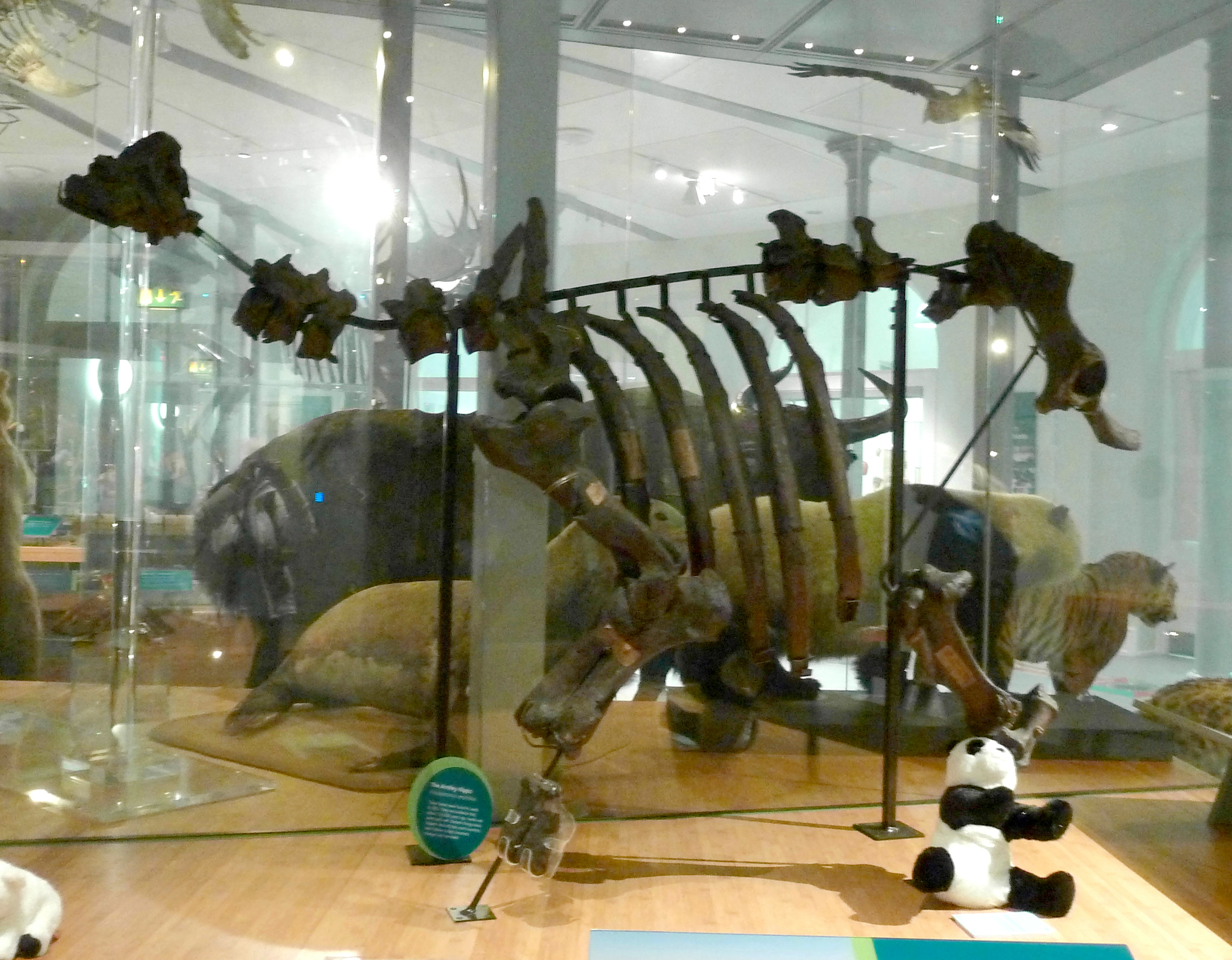
Side view, showing only 25 bones

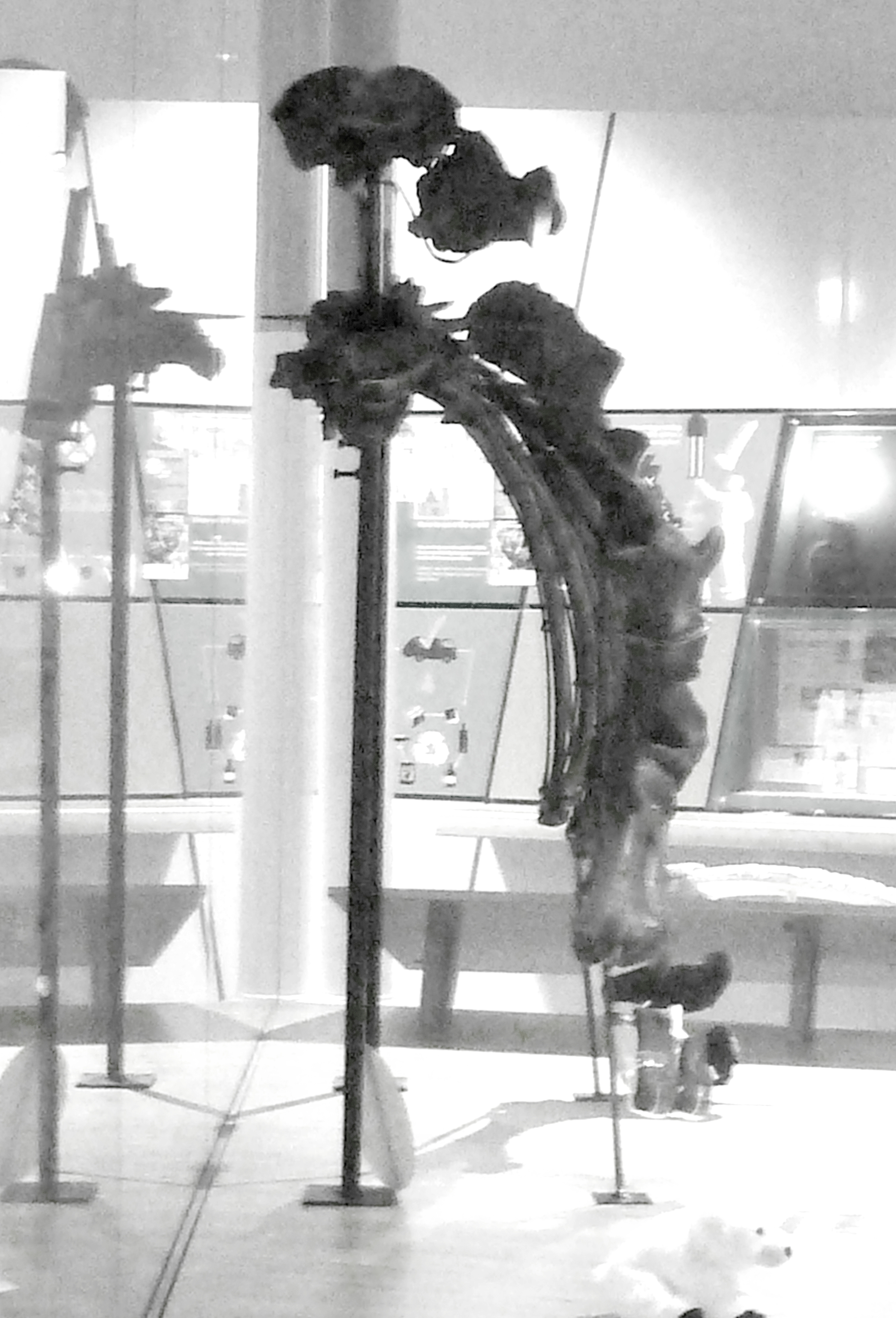
Front view, showing that only the left-hand-side bones are mounted

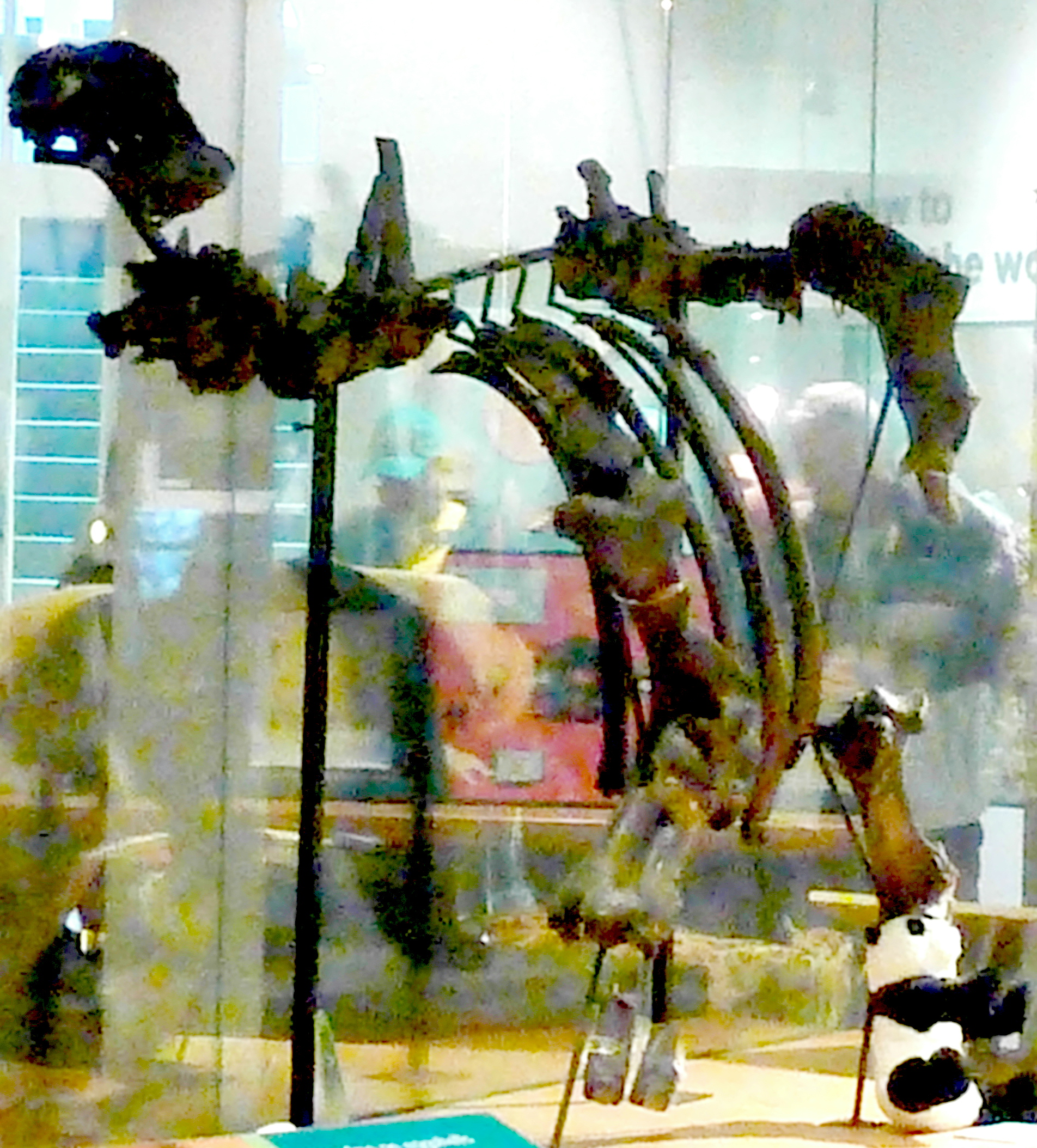
Three-quarter view from the front

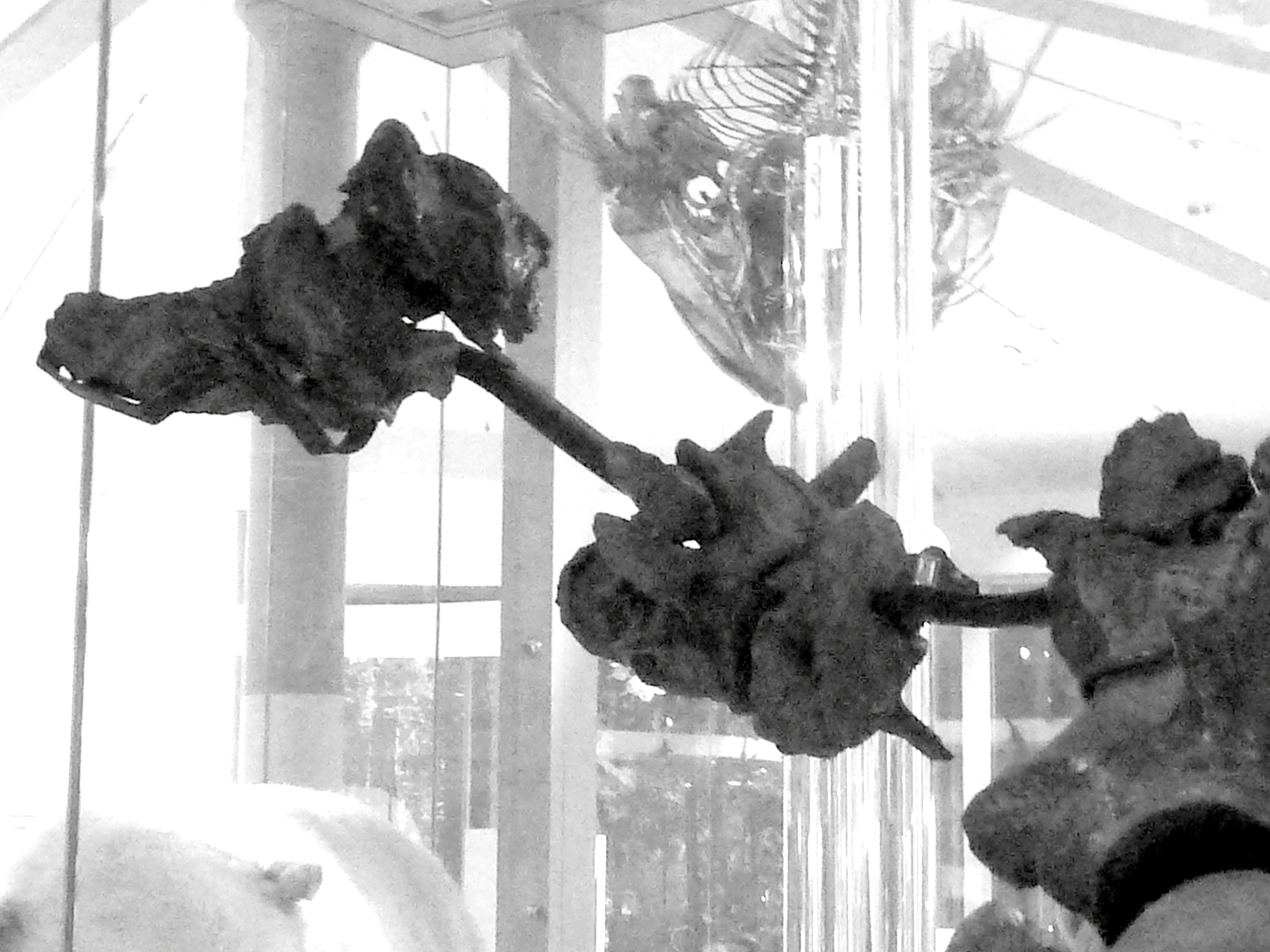
Skull, and neck vertebrae

== Pavement plaque ==
The discovery of the bones of four hippopotami is marked at some distance from the original site, on a pavement plaque outside 81 Town Street, Armley. The discovery date of 1852 (when bones of two hippopotami were found) given there might appear to have been confused with a similar discovery made at the same brickfield site in 1851 (when the bones of four hippopotami were found), so that it says "1852" instead of "1851". However, because museum curator Henry Denny dug there a number of times, it is possible that bones from the same hippopotamus were discovered over two years.

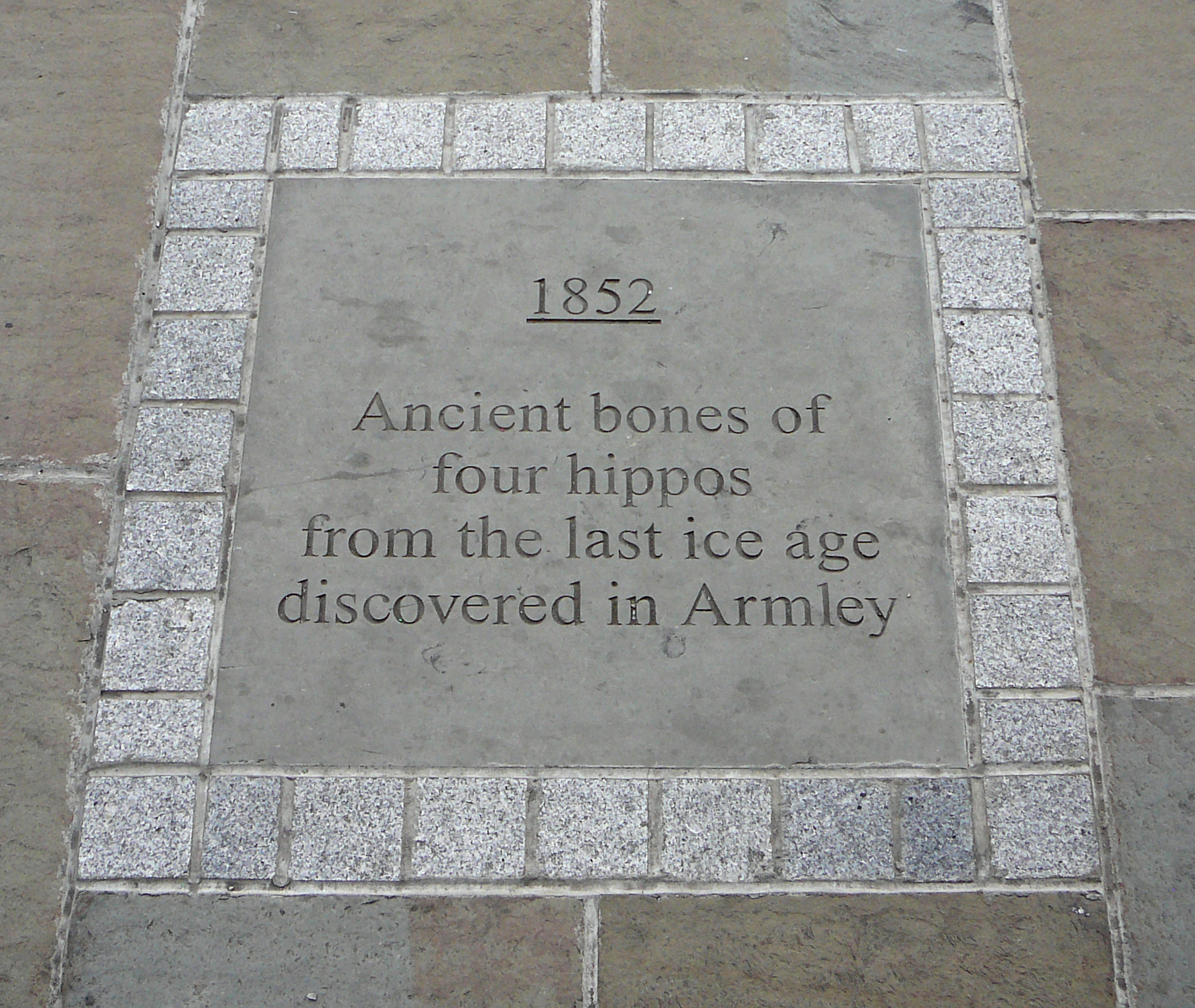
Pavement plaque, Town Street, Armley

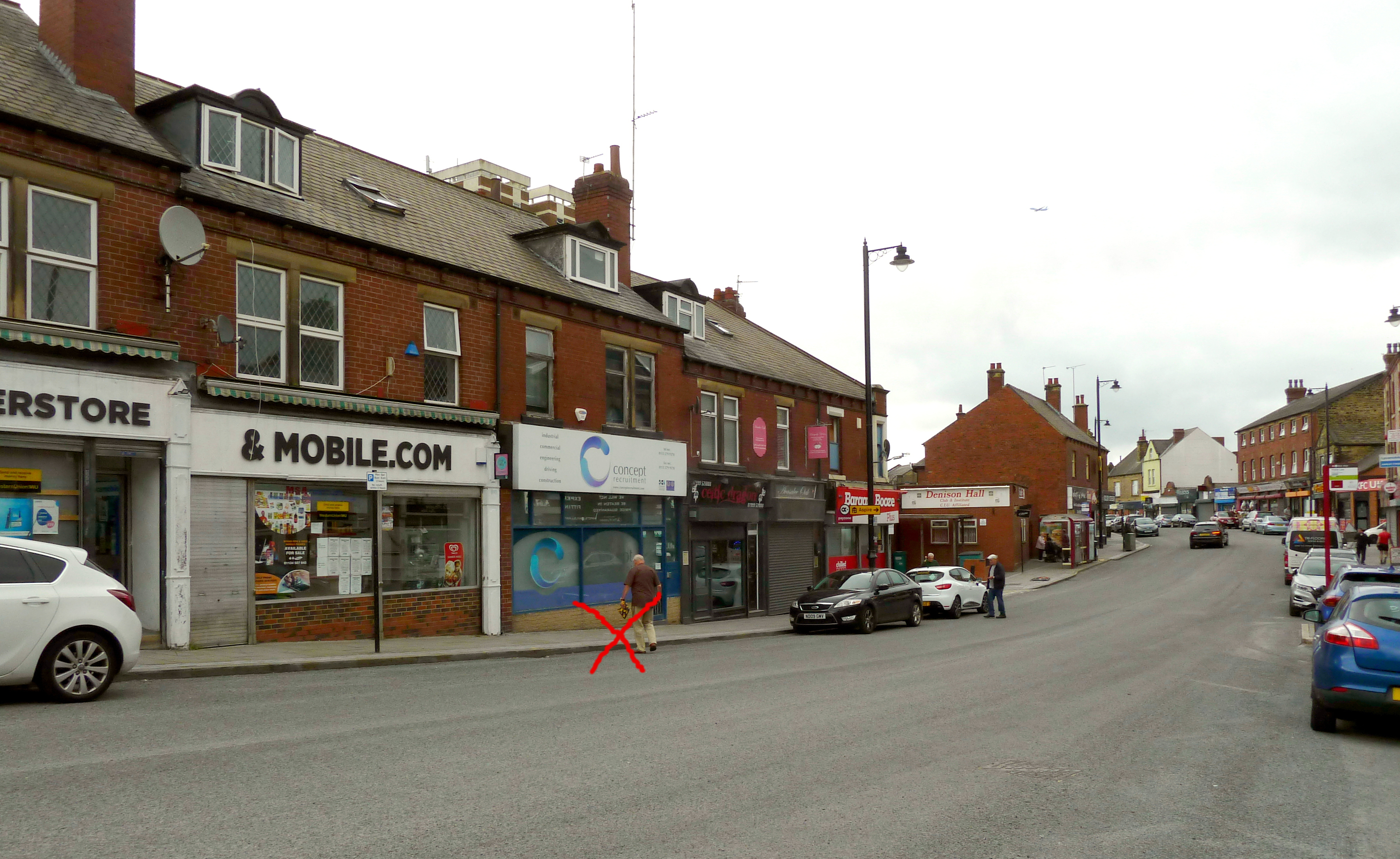
Location of plaque, in Town Street

== Armley Hippo in popular culture ==
The Armley Hippo caught the public imagination. In 1924, Professor Percy Fry Kendall described the ice age in Yorkshire as "a time when Yorkshire hills and dales were peopled with fierce wild beasts – when the hippopotamus wallowed in the river swamps of the Aire, the Ouse and the Ribble".

=== Armley Hippo as an educational tool ===
In 2008 the geography department of the University of Leeds organised the Leeds Hippo Project for schoolchildren on the theme of the Armley Hippo (under its previous name, Leeds Hippopotamus or Leeds Hippo). Dr Jon Barber said, "We aim to use the bones to engage pupils and families with the University and the museum". The project involved the Royal Armouries, Leeds, Leeds City Museum and four local primary schools. Teaching within the National Curriculum guidelines, workshops and visits to Leeds City Museum were included in the project.

The Armley Hippo was celebrated in the I Love West Leeds Festival of 3–25 July 2010. Armley Primary School children attended the festival, and the organisers made "hundreds of plaster hippos ... inviting local people to have a go at decorating them".

In 2017 and 2019 Leeds City Museum held a week of educational events for children on the subject of the Armley Hippo. A central feature in 2019 was an animation created from a story and drawings by school-children Lochan Chakrabarti and Holly Reeve; it was premiered on Millennium Square, Leeds in front of the museum. Other events included "a display of all the competition entries, hippo crafts and a CSI-style event exploring a fictitious animal crime scene". A mural showing the hippo was created in Armley Town Street in 2019.

== See also ==
- Allenton hippopotamus fossil H. amphibius specimen from Derby
- List of individual hippopotamids
