= James Dickinson (taxidermist) =

British conservation-restoration taxidermist

James Dickinson M.B.E.
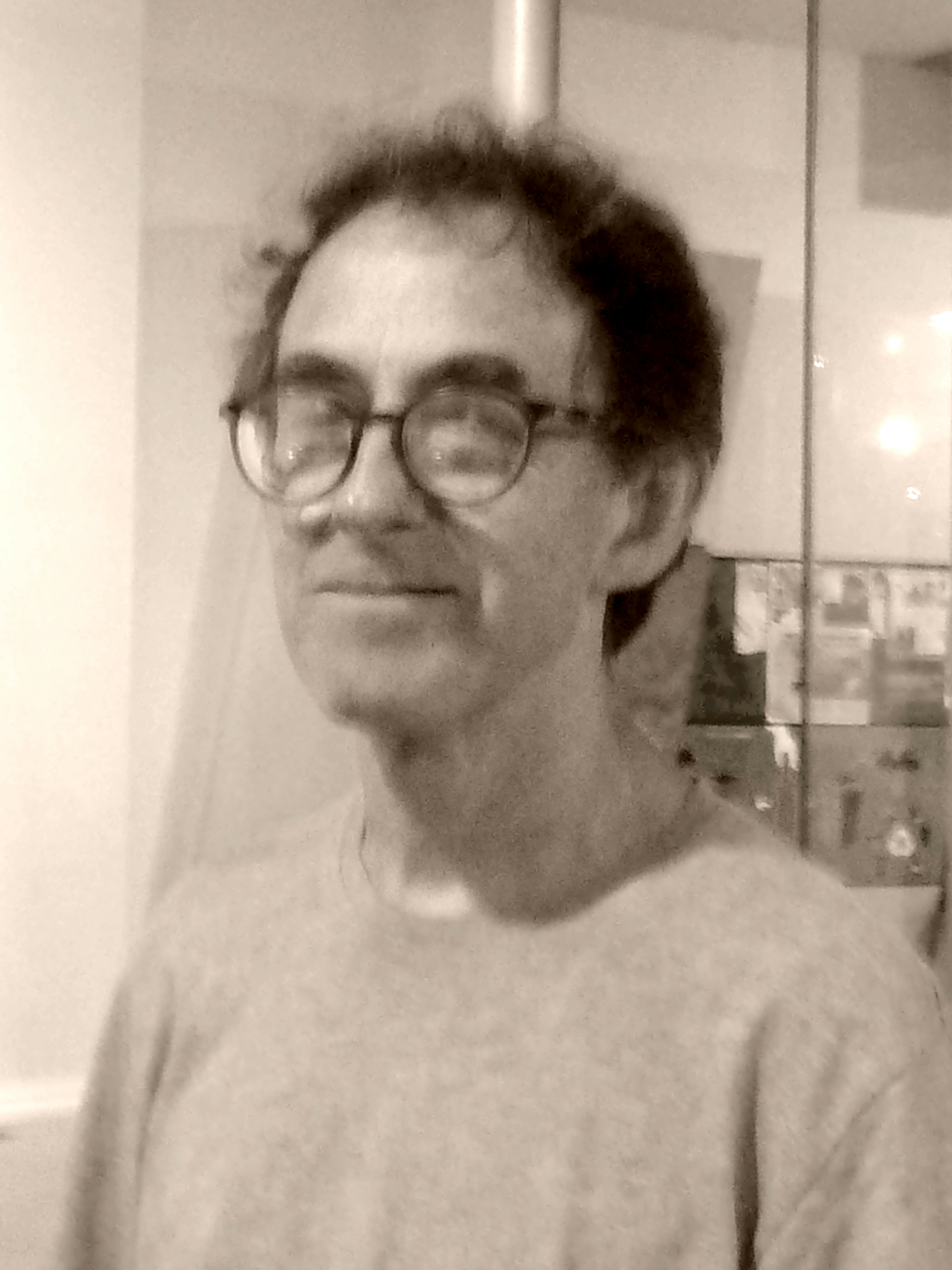
- James Dickinson in 2021
- Born: 1950 (age 75–76); Leeds, West Riding of Yorkshire, England
- Occupations: Conservation-restoration, taxidermy
- Years active: 1970–2014
- Notable work: Conservation work at North of England museums, including the Leeds Irish elk, the Armley Hippo, the Leeds polar bear, and the Warrington seal.
- Title: Former conservation officer for Lancashire County Museums Service, and National Trust taxidermist
- Awards: Member of the British Empire

James Arnold Dickinson, MBE, (born 1950, Leeds) is a British conservation-restoration taxidermist who repaired mounted animal skins and skeletons for museums in the United Kingdom for 40 years. Among his restoration works are the Leeds Irish elk, the Leeds polar bear (a "prized exhibit"), the Armley Hippo, and the Warrington seal (Warrington's "most famous animal").

Dickinson was a founder member of the Guild of Taxidermists, and was made a Member of the British Empire in 1990 for "services to taxidermy". He has been described as "an internationally renowned taxidermist".

== Background and training ==
James Arnold Dickinson was born in Leeds in 1950. He recalled in 2008: "I used to collect bones, feathers and insects ever since I was a boy at school. During my A-levels in the 1960s, I saw an advert in a newspaper about a bursary for a taxidermist training course run by the Museums Association".

Between 1968 and 1971 Dickinson trained at Bolton and Leicester Museums in the United Kingdom, having indeed received the bursary in 1968 from the Carnegie UK Trust and Museums Association. His mentors at Leicester were taxidermists Dick Hendry and Ted Williams. Following this, he studied in the museums of Germany and Switzerland, where he was shown practical taxidermy in the form of examples of historical specimens, between January and March 1972. In the same year he married Jean Howard, in Leeds.

== Career ==
=== Field of taxidermy ===
Taxidermy became a widespread art during the 19th century, after advances in the preservation of skins with preparations of arsenic. Its place in museums and private collections, and in zoological research, was well-established by the first half of the 20th century. However by the 1960s there had been a sharp decline in interest "when taxidermy almost disappeared". Dickinson said, "The last great rise in interest was in the 1970s and 1980s ... but all those people who were becoming taxidermists then are ageing now and we're not seeing in increase in young people coming along, saying, I want to be a taxidermist". During his career, Dickinson was "one of the last experts in the field" of conservation-restoration taxidermy.

Dickinson was a chairman of the Guild of Taxidermists, having been a founder member of the Guild in 1976. In 2006, he explained the original aims of the Guild:

Fortunately all ... were in agreement that the most important matter that they needed to address was raising standards. And not just standards of work but standards that affect the way that taxidermy is perceived. In those days many in the conservation world considered taxidermists a serious threat to wildlife.

=== Bolton Museum and City Museum Sheffield ===
Dickinson's first employment was as a taxidermist at Bolton Museum, between 1970 and 1971. Following that position, he worked between 1971 and 1972 in City Museum, Sheffield, as a natural history technician.

=== North West Museums Service ===
At the North West Museums Service, England, in 1973 Dickinson became natural history officer, then senior conservator in its natural history department. His work covered the repair of taxidermy in museums across Northern England.

In 1999 Dickinson restored the Warrington seal, "the town's most famous animal". The seal was shot in Paddington Lock on the Mersey near Warrington, in 1908. In that year the 660-kilogram (104-stone) animal was mounted for Warrington Museum & Art Gallery, and its open mouth was "blanked ... off with painted plaster". When Dickinson repaired the mouth, he recreated the teeth with moulds made from a seal skull, and replaced the whiskers with some "rescued from an old tiger".

=== Lancashire County Museums Service ===
From 2001, Dickinson's final appointment before he retired from museum service was as conservation officer in the natural sciences department of Lancashire County Museums Service, a department of Lancashire County Council. The department is based at Lancashire Conservation Studios. In 2008 he said that he was "one of only five dedicated museum taxidermists in the country and accredited to do work for the National Trust". Describing his work at that time, he said, "I conserve old natural history items such as prehistoric bones and prepare items for public display in Lancashire museums and across the country. I work on a variety of species for taxidermy including birds, rare parrots, insects and other wildlife".

Dickinson was involved in taxidermic repairs during the preparations for the re-opening of Leeds City Museum at the former Leeds Mechanics Institute in 2008. He "produced a number of the new mounts for the Life on Earth gallery", including for the Leeds Irish Elk and Armley Hippo skeletons, (Note: Records concerning the acquisition and repair of the Leeds Irish Elk are held at the Discovery Centre, Canal Road, Leeds, West Yorkshire.) the latter of which was over 100,000 years old. Dickinson also repaired the 200-year-old mounted polar bear skin which was donated to the museum by Leeds Philosophical and Literary Society in 1828. He gave it a "cold shower clean-up" outdoors, then retouched its face and "other bare patches", and remounted it. It is one of the museum's "most prized exhibits". Dickinson said, "There is a real sense of achievement when you see items on public display for scientific and educational purposes.

=== Selected works ===
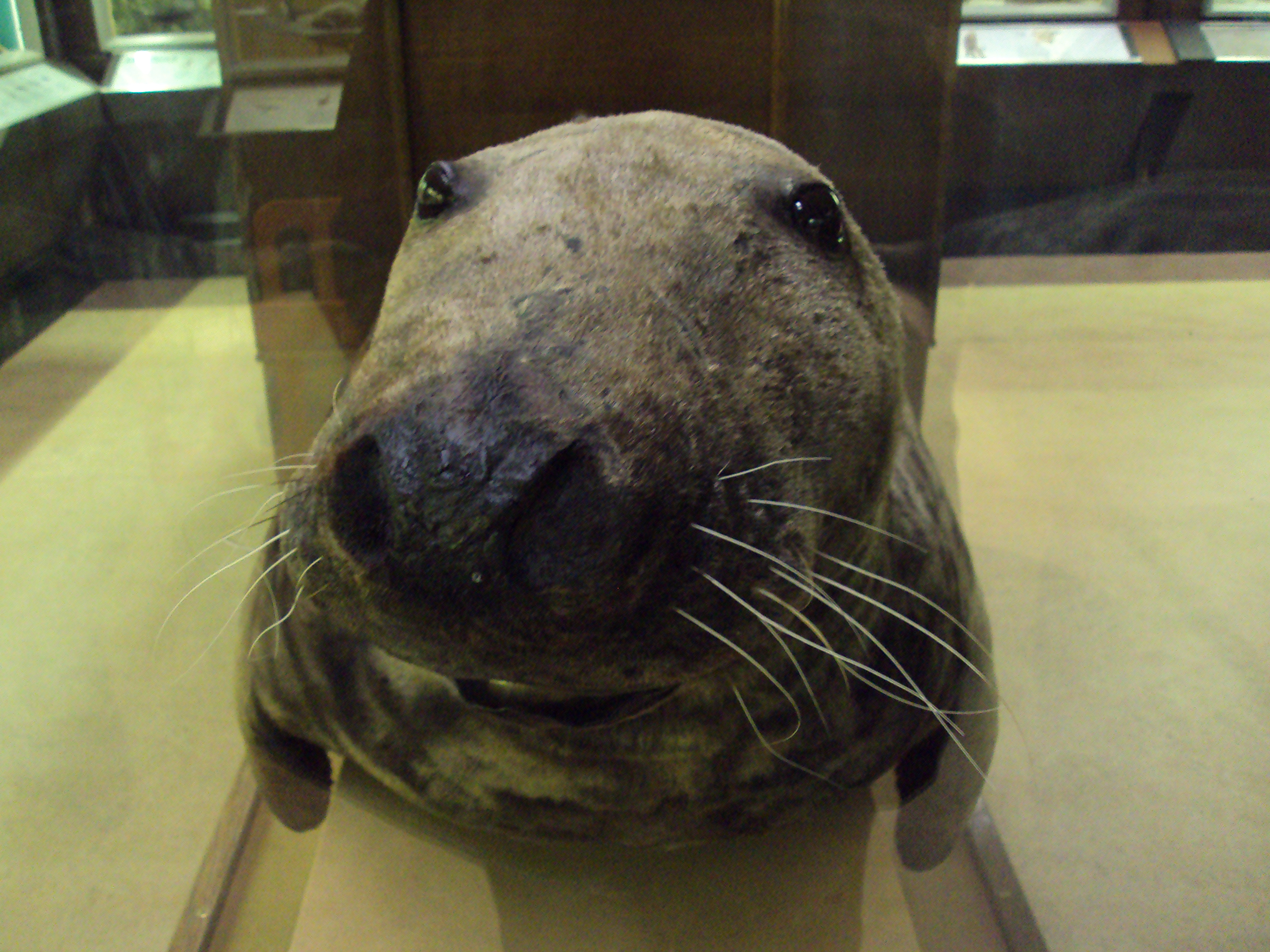
Warrington seal, conservation

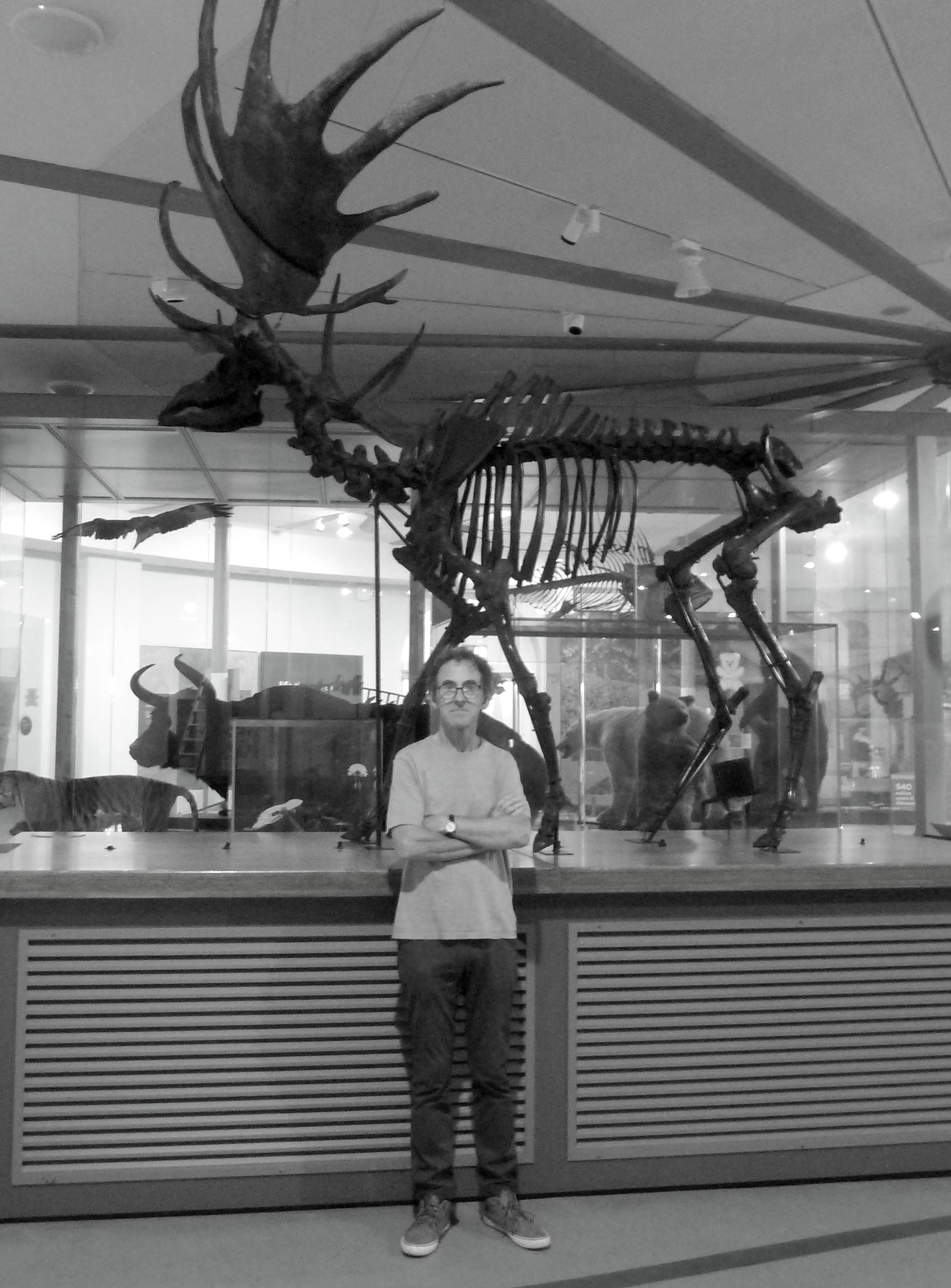
James Dickinson, with the Leeds Irish Elk, mount

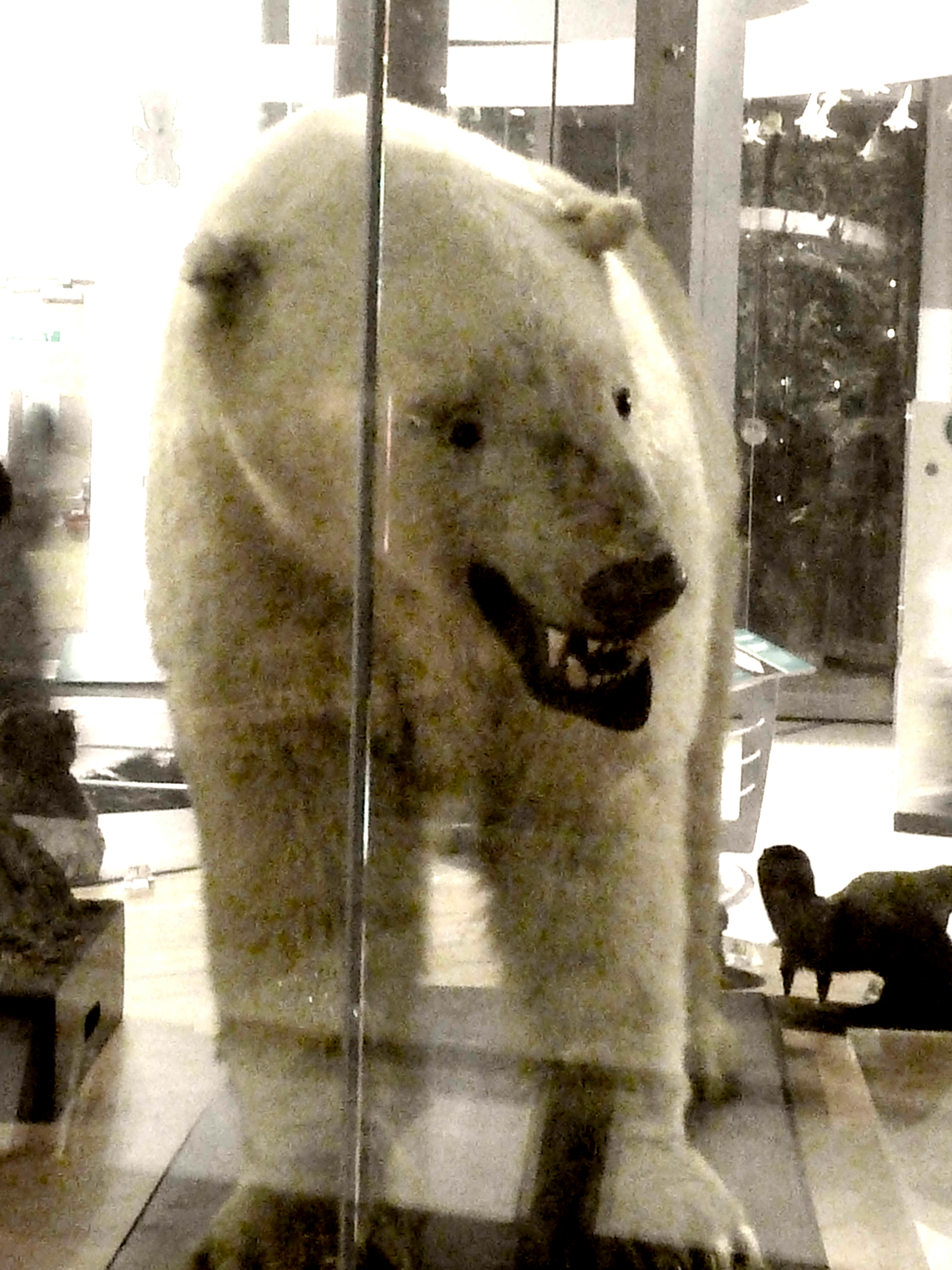
Leeds polar bear, conservation

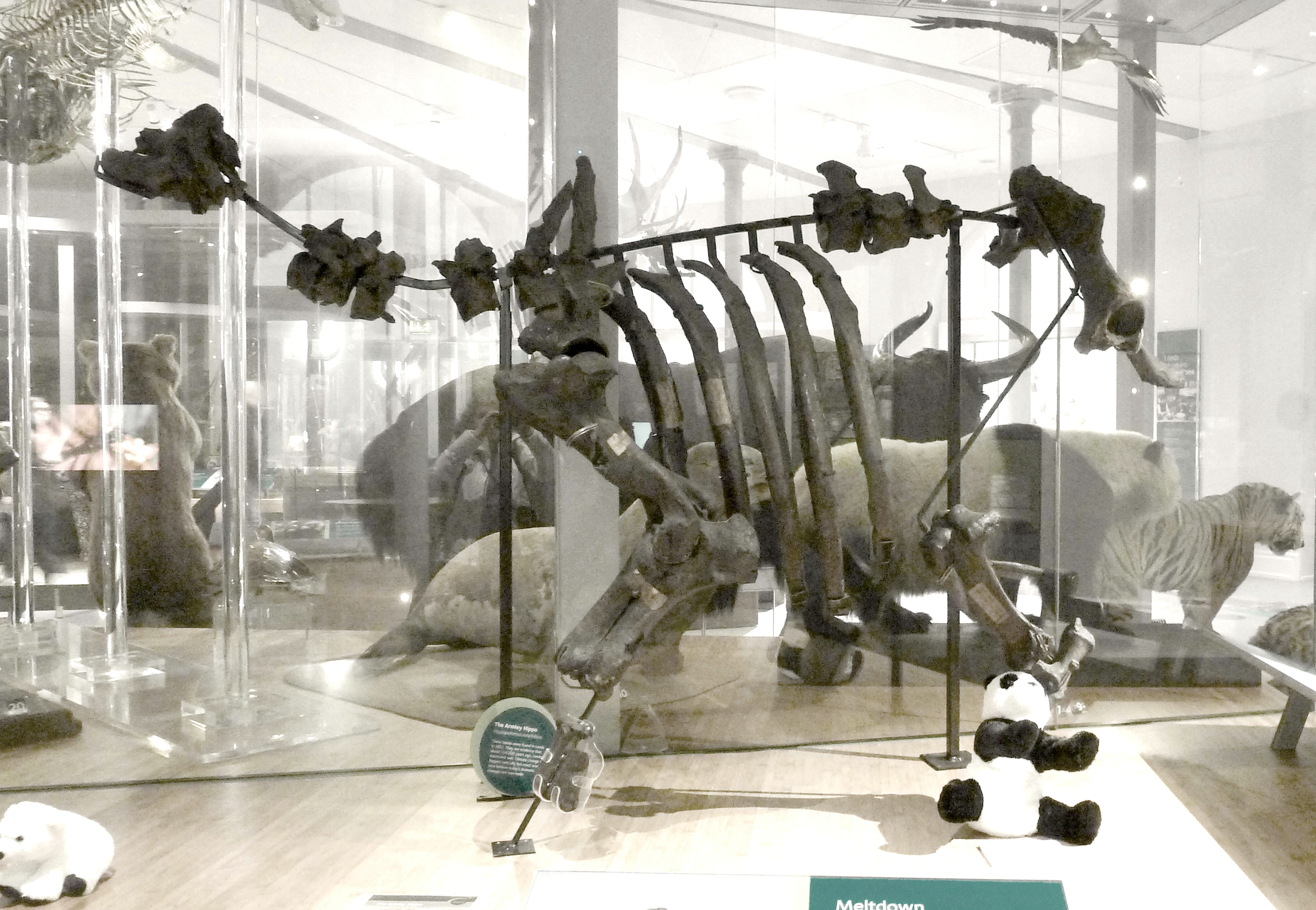
Armley Hippo, mount

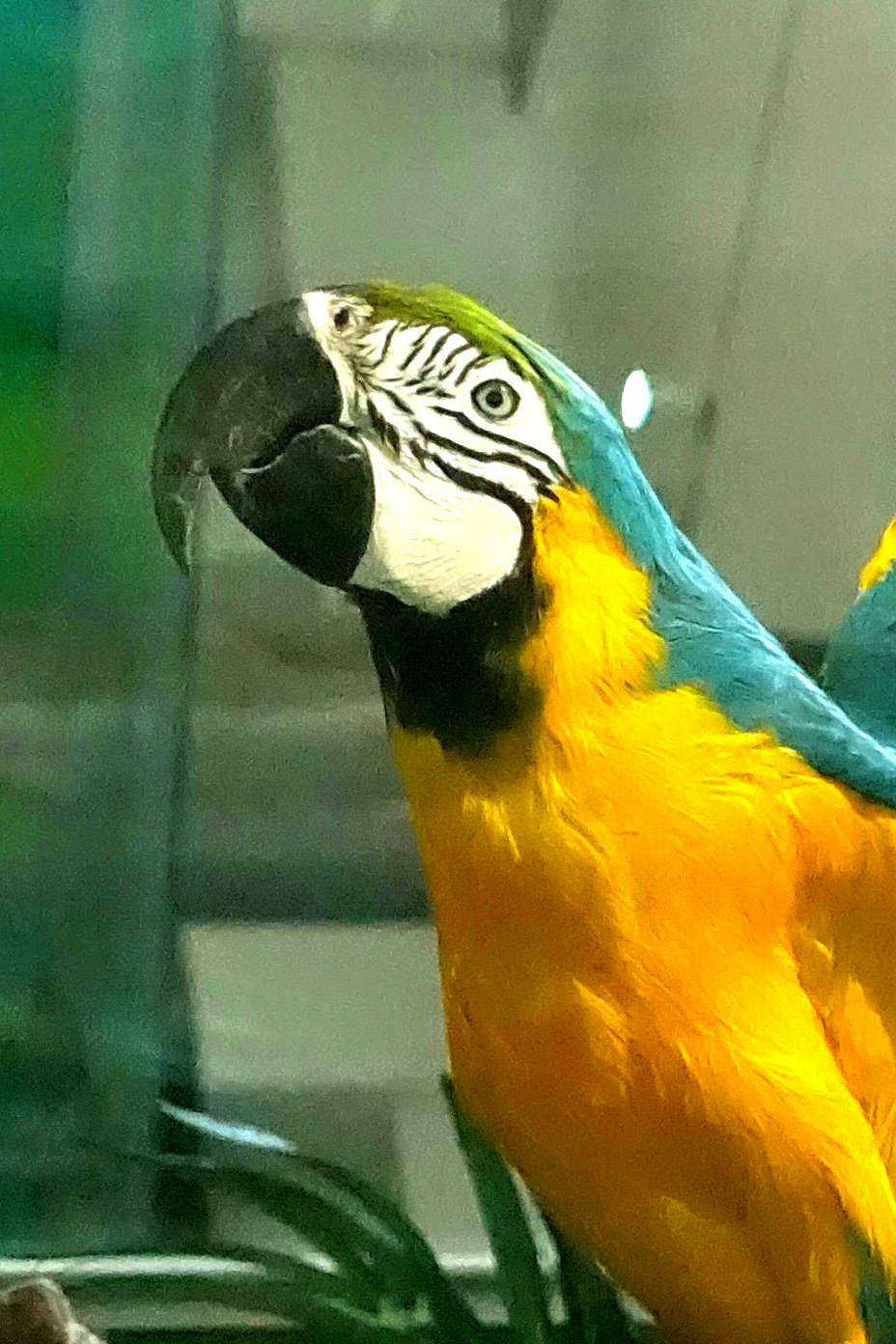
Leeds blue-and-yellow macaw, mount

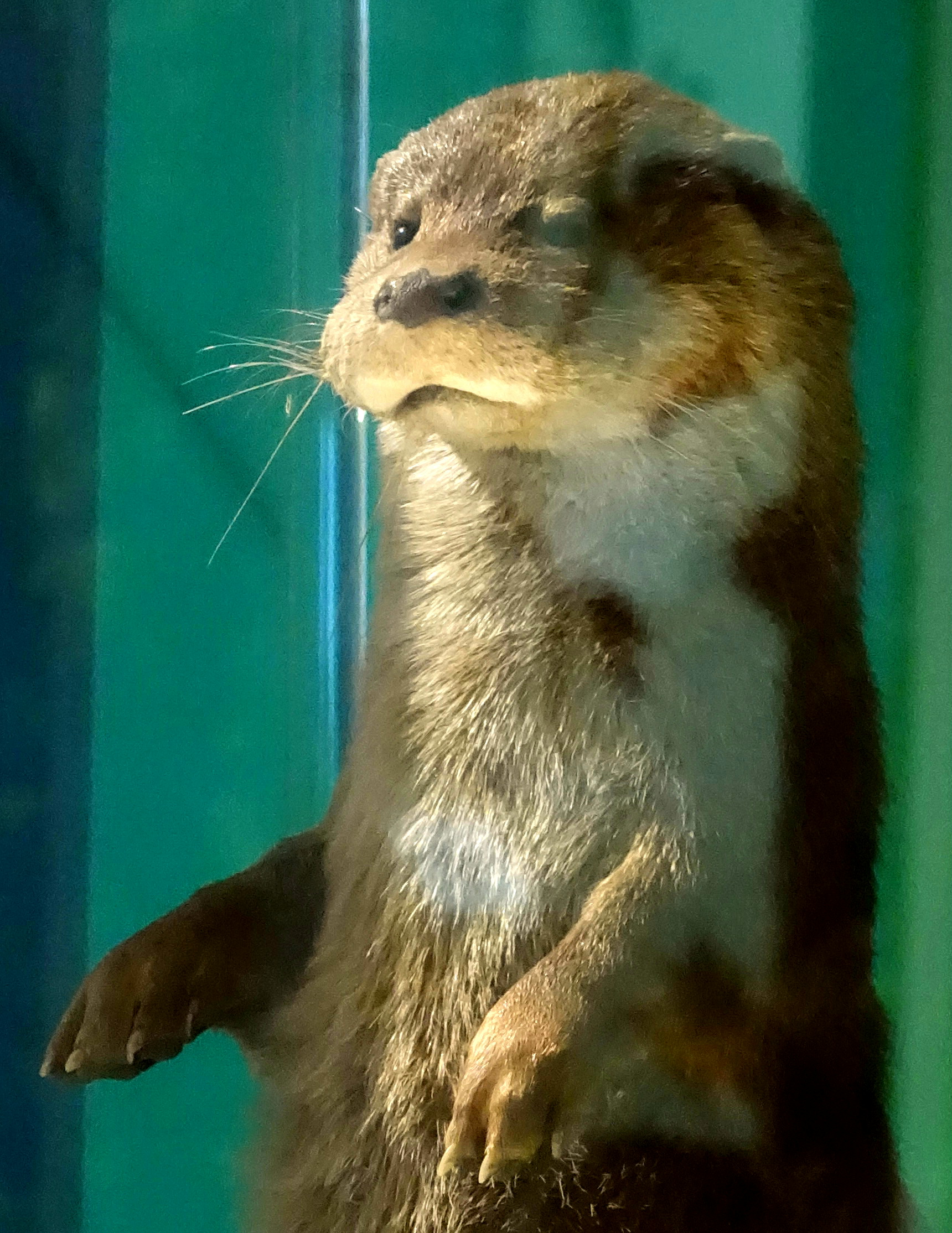
Leeds Eurasian otter, mount

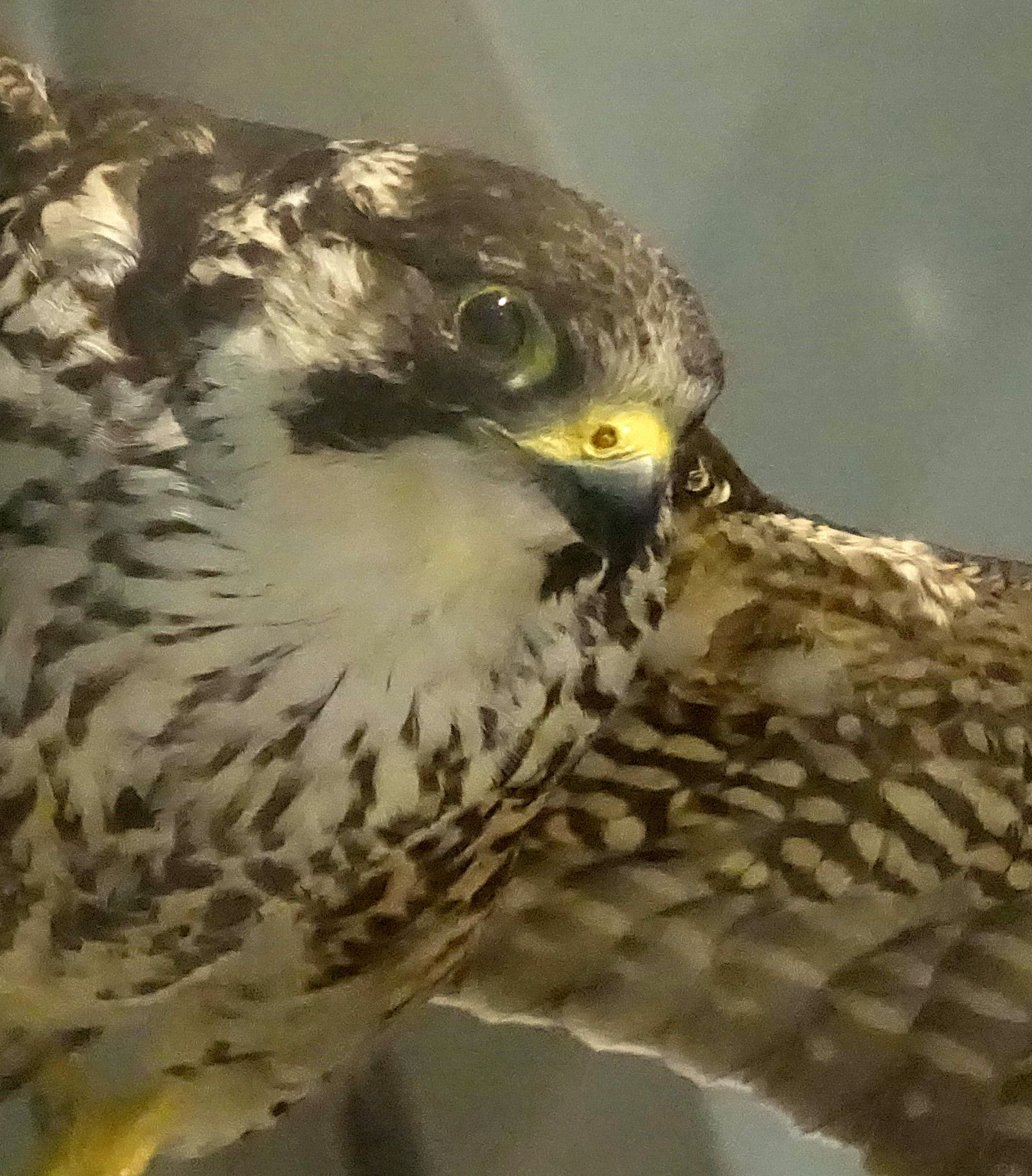
Leeds peregrine falcon, mount

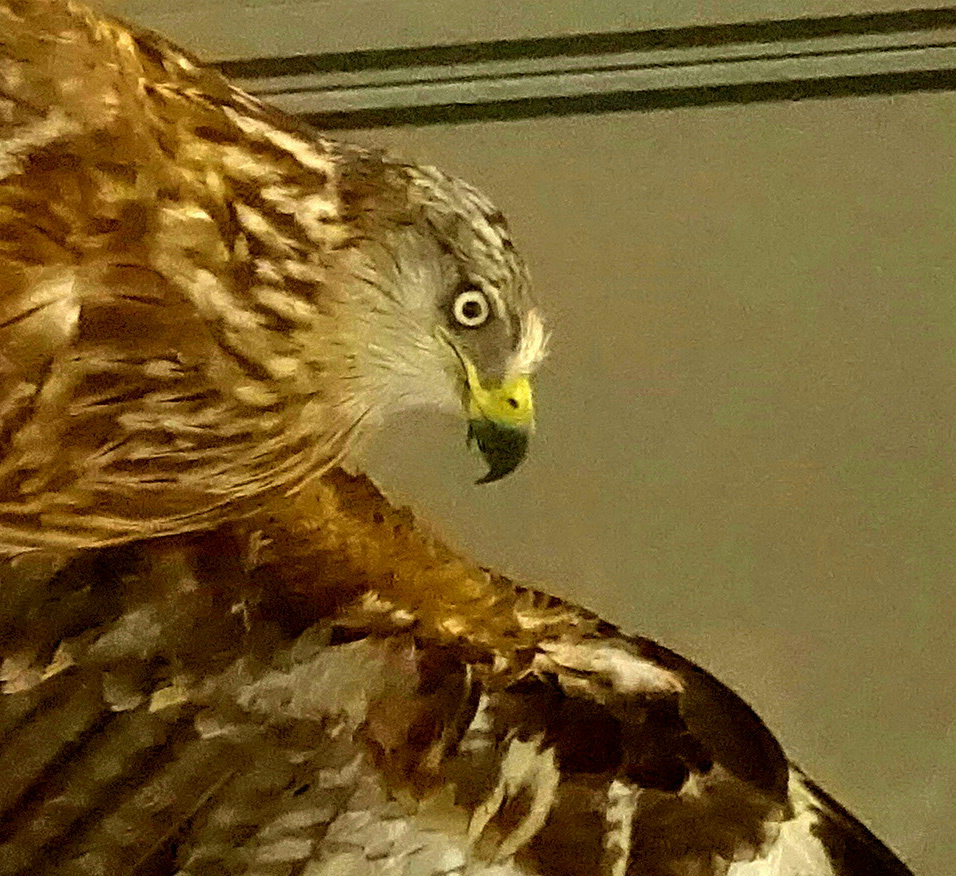
Leeds red kite, mount

=== Workshops, lectures, and public communication ===
Dickinson has been involved in workshops and lectures during his career. For example, for the Natural Sciences Collections Association (NatSCA) in 2007 at the Lancashire Conservation Studio he demonstrated the preparation of a small mammal study skin, with a discussion of field data, methodology, and advice covering common difficulties. On 1 April 2015 he gave a talk for NatSCA at a session entitled "Understanding Museum Taxidermy: Construction, Care and Commissioning" at the same studio. He gave advice on accessing animal skins to would-be taxidermists: "If you live near the sea, go beachcombing, for example, and always be on the look-out for roadkill. You get used to driving with one eye in the gutter".

On 29 September 2012 Dickinson took part in a BBC Radio 4 show with Claire Balding, called Taxidermists in Boston Spa, West Yorkshire, in the Ramblings series, number 22.

=== Retirement from museum service ===
Dickinson retired from the Lancashire County Museum Service and other work between 2012 and 2014. By that time, he had built up 40 years-worth of specialist skills from which his department benefited, and his natural history conservation post was the only such post in existence. Lucie A Graham succeeded him in the post.

Until at least 2003 Dickinson remained in his position as the National Trust taxidermist. In 2014, as a light-hearted reference to past taxidermic fakery, he concocted an Arctic platypus for the performance art company Avanti, who described him as "an internationally renowned taxidermist".

== Collections ==
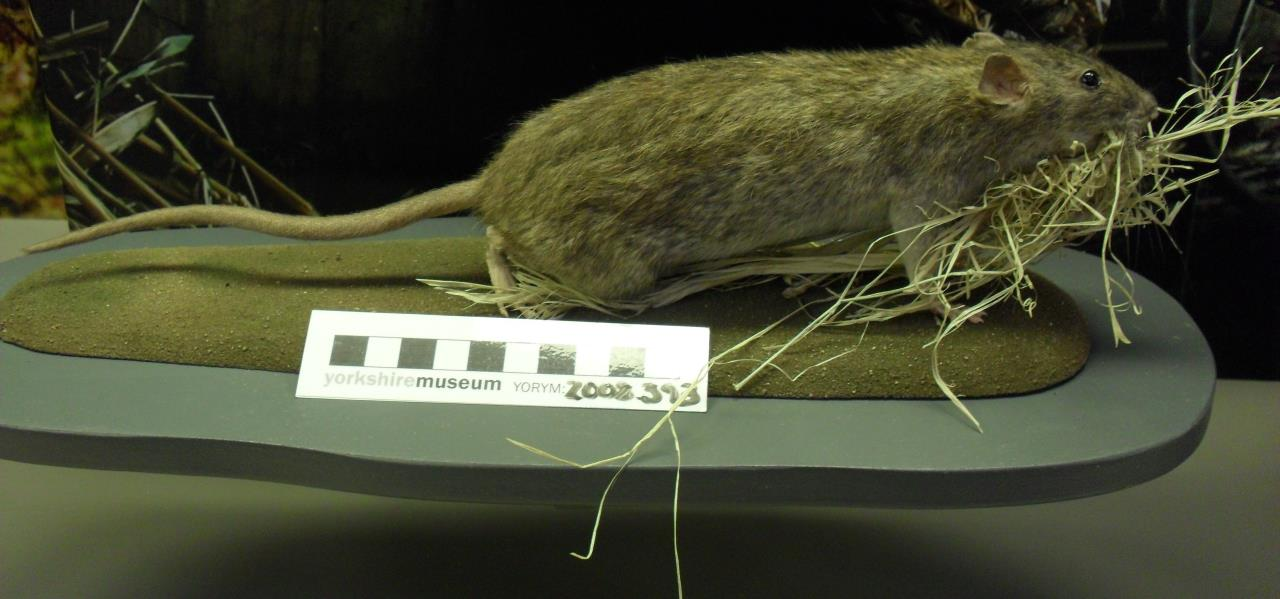
Brown rat by James Dickinson, 2008

- Leeds City Museum: At least seven created mounts including: Leeds Irish elk, Armley Hippo, Leeds red kite, Leeds peregrine falcon, Leeds macaw, Leeds otter, Leeds stag beetle. Large number of restorations including: Leeds polar bear, Leeds Tiger; Leeds dodo. All works dated 2008. (Note: Records for the created mounts are at Leeds Discovery Centre, Leeds, West Yorkshire, England. The accession numbers are: red kite: LEEDM.C.2009.108; peregrine: LEEDM.C.2008.26; macaw: LEEDM.C.L.2008.15; otter: LEEDM.C.1989.11.8922; two stag beetles: LEEDM.C.2008.4.326 and LEEDM.C.2008.4.327; parts of several dodos: LEEDM.C.1865.10 and LEEDM.C.1866.26)
- Warrington Museum & Art Gallery: Restoration: Warrington seal.
- York Museums Trust: Created mount: York brown rat.
- Trinity College Dublin Zoological Museum: Restoration: Dublin great auk (the last in Ireland, extinct since 1884).

== Associations ==
- Honorary member of the Guild of Taxidermists; founder member and former chairman.
- Fellow of the Museums Association.

== Awards ==
- Member of the Order of the British Empire (MBE), awarded "for services to taxidermy" in 1990.

== Publications ==
- Dickinson, James (2006). "Taxidermy". In Kite; Thomson (eds.). Conservation of leather and related materials. Routledge. pp. 130–140. ISBN 9780367606350.
