= John Riley (poet) =

Poet of the British Poetry Revival (1937–1978)

John Riley (10 October 1937 – 27 or 28 October 1978) was a poet who was associated with the British Poetry Revival.

Riley was born and raised in Leeds, and was educated at West Leeds High School. He served in the Royal Air Force from 1956 to 1958 before studying English as an exhibitioner at Pembroke College, Cambridge, graduating in 1961. He then worked as a teacher in various schools around the Cambridge area. During this period, he became acquainted with many of the poets who constituted the Cambridge group, a key element of the Revival.

He left Cambridge in 1966 to take up a teaching post in Bicester, near Oxford. That same year, he set up the Grosseteste Press with his friend Tim Longville. The pair started a magazine, Grosseteste Review, two years later. Riley retired from teaching in 1970 and returned to Leeds to write full-time. In 1977, he was received into the Eastern Orthodox Church. He was murdered in an incident near his home on the night of 27–28 October 1978.

Riley was influenced by Charles Olson and Osip Mandelstam, whose poetry he translated into English. His first book, Ancient and Modern, was published in 1967 and the posthumous The Collected Works in 1980. The latter includes the first full printing of his major long poem, Czargrad, a work that reflected his religious outlook and preoccupation with Russian and Byzantine culture. A collection of Selected Poems was published by Carcanet Press in 1995.
