= Wortley, Leeds =

Coordinates: 53.787°N 1.586°W

Wortley
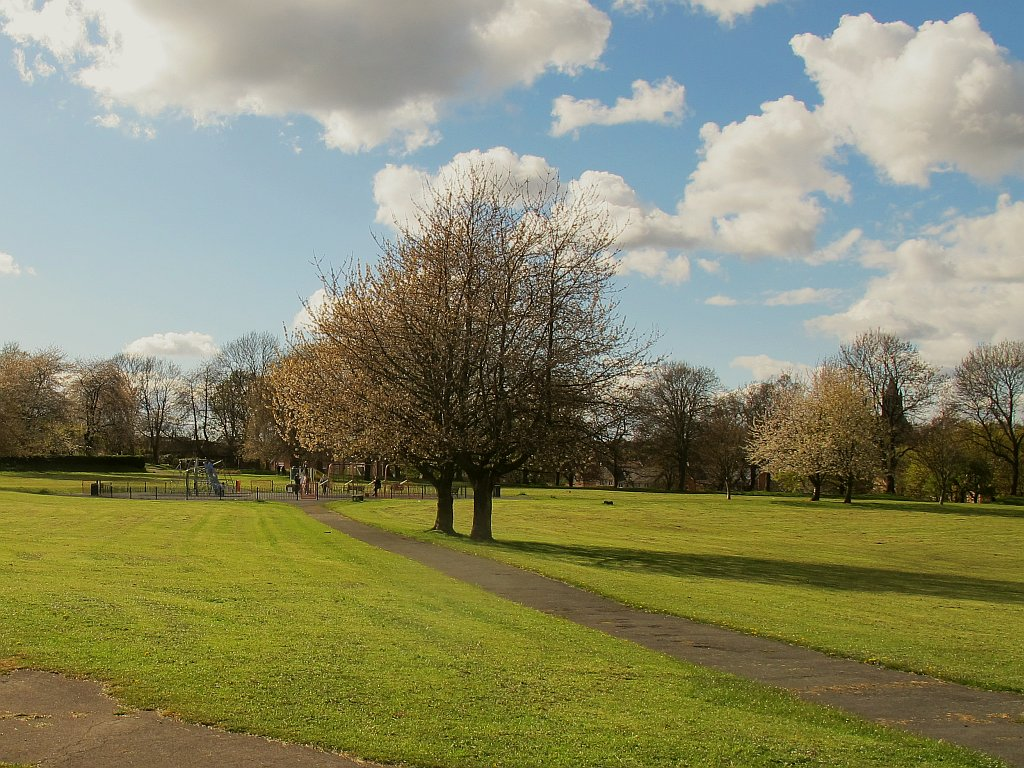
- Wortley Recreation Ground

- Location within West Yorkshire
- OS grid reference: SE2632
- Metropolitan borough: City of Leeds
- Metropolitan county: West Yorkshire
- Region: Yorkshire and the Humber
- Country: England
- Sovereign state: United Kingdom
- Post town: LEEDS
- Postcode district: LS12
- Dialling code: 0113
- Police: West Yorkshire
- Fire: West Yorkshire
- Ambulance: Yorkshire
- UK Parliament: Leeds South West and Morley.

Wortley (/ˈwɜːrtli/ WURT-lee) is an inner city area of Leeds, West Yorkshire, England. It begins one mile to the west of the city centre. The appropriate City of Leeds ward is called Farnley and Wortley.

It was known as Wirkelay until about 1700. Wortley was a weaving township within the parish of Leeds before it became industrial with coal pits, brickworks, railway yards and engine sheds—including a roundhouse, on Wellington Road. This listed building, originally constructed to house a dozen or so steam locomotives, was until 2022 the premises of a commercial vehicle hire company. In the 1880s, Wortley became incorporated into the expanding (then) town of Leeds.

Wortley is divided into three areas: New Wortley, Upper Wortley and Lower Wortley.

== New Wortley ==
New Wortley is the area closest to Leeds city centre, Armley and Holbeck and close to HM Prison Leeds. It is largely made up of 1960s high-rise flats and maisonettes having previously been made up of red brick back to back terraces until slum clearance began in the 1960s

== Upper Wortley ==
Upper Wortley is situated between Armley and Lower Wortley; specifically between the boundaries of Tong Road to the north and Oldfield Lane/ Green Hill Lane to the south. It consists of a variety of Victorian terraces, 1950s semi-detached houses and modern low-rise flats and houses.

== Lower Wortley ==
Lower Wortley is furthest from the city centre, closer to Gildersome, Farnley and the Greenbelt. The area sits between the boundaries of Oldfield Lane to the north and Gelderd Road to the South. Housing in Lower Wortley is predominantly 1950s semi-detached with some modern low-rise flats and newly built houses.

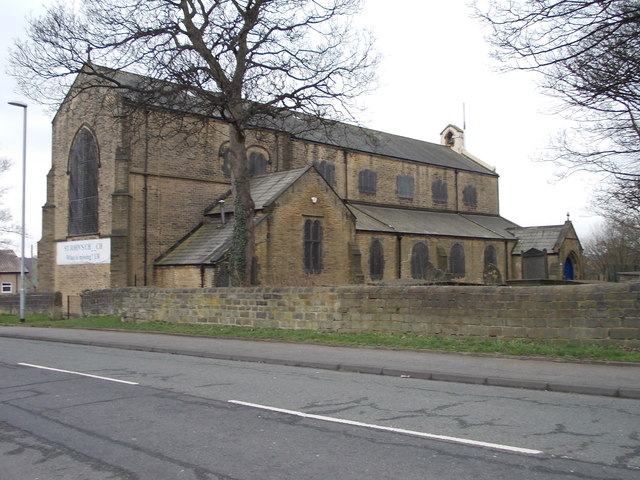
St Johns church, Lower Wortley

Lower Wortley is home to Booker (formerly Makro) and Matalan as well as many car dealerships. These are popular in this area of the city due to Lower Wortley's convenient location close to the Leeds Outer Ring Road and the M621 motorway.

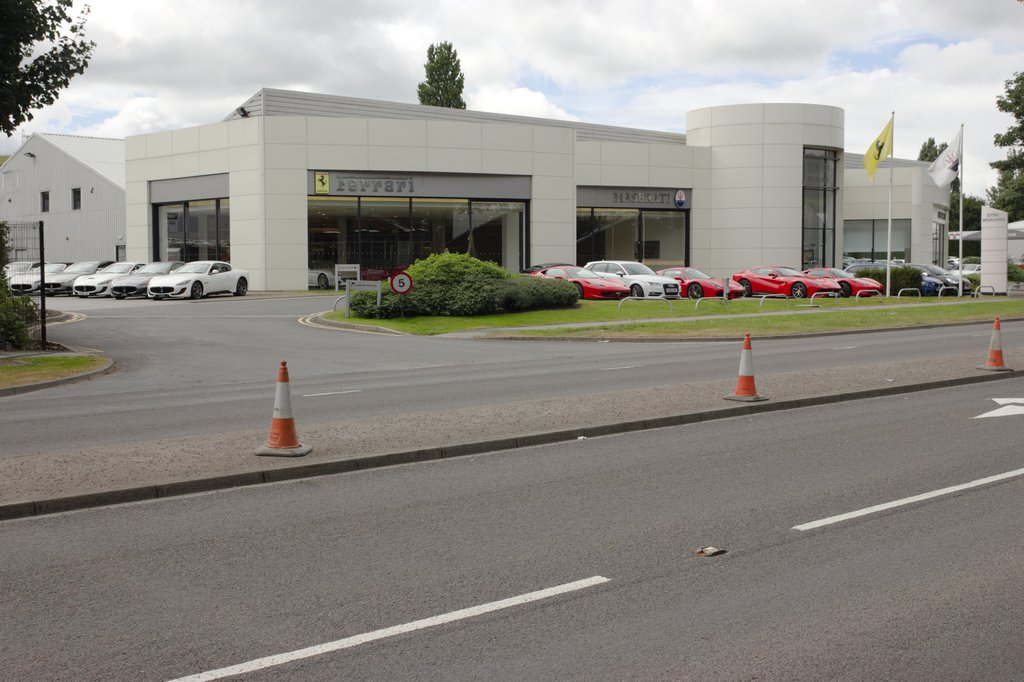
Car Dealerships in Lower Wortley

== History ==
Wortley grew, much like surrounding areas during the Industrial Revolution. While Wortley was home to some smaller industrial works, its proximity to the industrial centres of Armley and Holbeck encouraged gradual growth. Perhaps Wortley's most notable features at this time were the vast array of railway junctions and its two gasworks, a smaller one in Lower Wortley and Leeds' largest gasworks in New Wortley which, until early 2022, was marked by the presence of a large spiral guided gasholder.

Wortley was formerly a township in the parish of Leeds and a chapelry, in 1866 Wortley became a separate civil parish, on 26 March 1904 the parish was abolished to form Armley and Bramley. In 1901 the parish had a population of 27,456.

On New Year's Day 1891 eleven girls, aged between nine and thirteen, were killed at a school pageant when their cotton-wool costumes were accidentally set on fire by the lighted Chinese lanterns they carried. The disaster gained international attention. A memorial dedicated to the Wortley "Snowflakes" stands in the grounds of St John's Church.

The landscape of Wortley changed considerably following World War II, when both the Leeds Corporation and private developers redeveloped the Victorian slum areas which had characterised Wortley since it developed. New Wortley was largely developed through the building of social housing, mainly in the form of high rise flats and prefabricated houses. Despite being built opposite what was then a gas works and is now a storage facility, the prefabricated houses were built with 'all-electric' heating, as was common at the time. In 2009, as part of a fuel poverty scheme the homes were connected to gas.

Lower Wortley and Upper Wortley saw less development than New Wortley with many of their larger Victorian through terracing still remaining and the redevelopment largely being undertaken by private developers who favoured low rise developments using more traditional methods of construction.

Between 1851 and 1852 the bones of the Armley Hippo, a great northern hippopotamus now extinct in the United Kingdom, was found in the ancient former southern channel of the River Aire, in an area previously part of Wortley, where the Armley Gyratory now stands.

== Amenities ==
Wortley is largely a residential area, with a fairly high population density. Although it is close to Leeds City Centre and Armley Town Street, there are still many parades of smaller local shops and there is an ASDA supermarket in Upper Wortley. There are about 12 pubs, and although there are no restaurants there are numerous take-away establishments.

There are three main parks: Wortley Recreation Ground, Cliffe Park and Western Flatts Park

Wortley Recreation Ground is closest to the City Centre, and offers views of surrounding areas, including the City Centre.

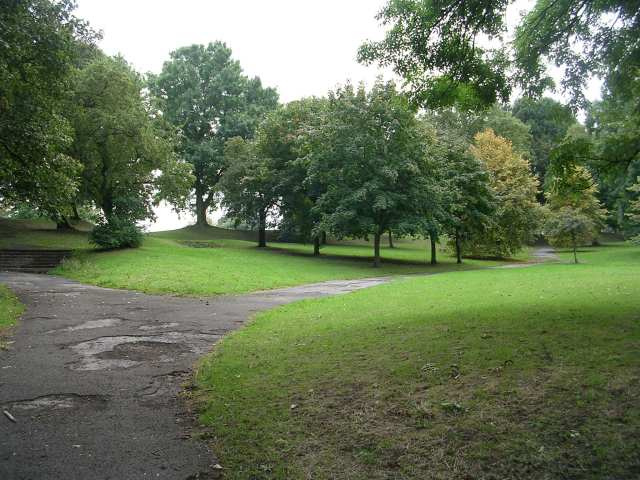
Wortley Recreation Ground

Often also referred to as New Worley Recreation Ground, it includes a children's playground, a skateboard park, three bowling greens and a number of pitches are marked out for football and rugby. The bowling greens and club building were a major filming location for the four-part Yorkshire Television comedy drama the Beiderbecke Connection, broadcast in 1988. Other brief scenes were filmed in the locality, including on Colmore Grove and Highfield Avenue.

Cliffe Park and Western Flatts Park form one large park, though they were once the grounds of separate mansions – Cliffe House and Western Flatts House. The latter was demolished a long time ago, but in the 1930s the former was handed over to the then Leeds Education Committee and turned into a residential school for 'difficult' boys, though now it has been lying derelict for many years.

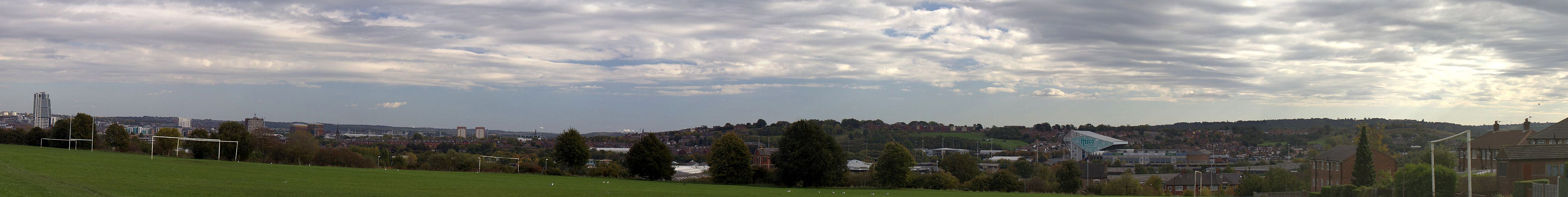
Views from Wortley Recreation Ground including Bridgewater Place, Beeston and Elland Road

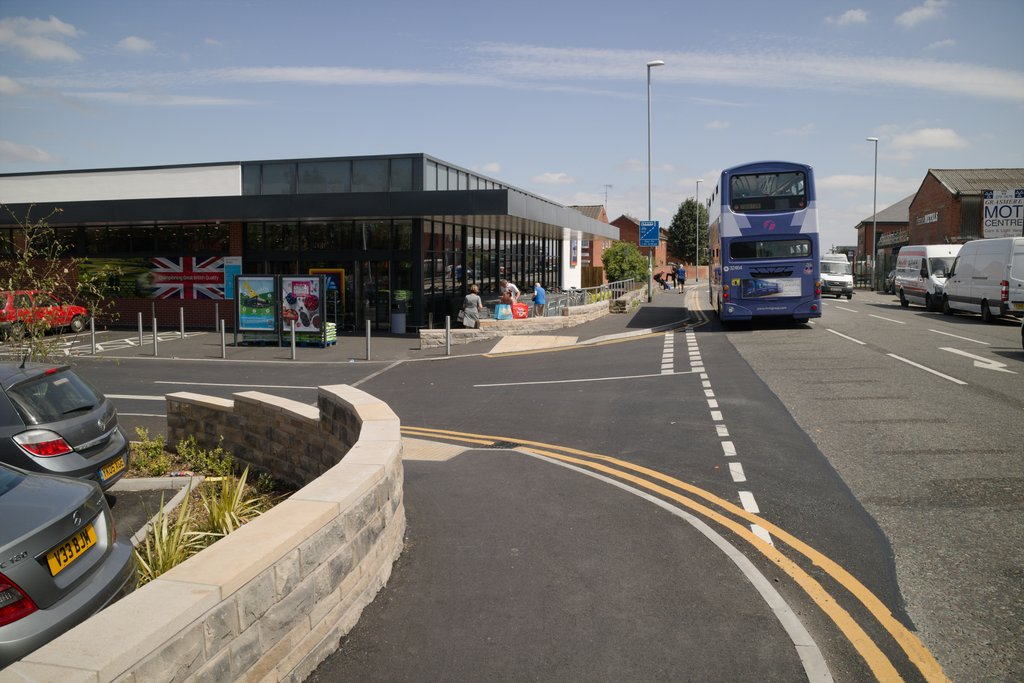
Aldi, Upper Wortley

Lower Wortley Methodist Church on Branch Road was built in 1884 as a United Methodist Free Church. It acts as a distribution centre for the Leeds North and West Foodbank.

== Education ==
Wortley has one high school, Dixons Unity Academy, based at the former West Leeds High School site. Close by, in Old Farnley, is The Farnley Academy, and further west, in Pudsey, is Crawshaw Academy. The former Wortley High School (which merged with West Leeds High) is awaiting redevelopment, while the listed former West Leeds Boys' High School building was converted into apartments. There are three primary schools: Five Lanes, Lower Wortley, and Whingate primary schools.

== Landmarks ==
Since the demolition of the New Wortley gas holder, perhaps the most prominent structures in Wortley are the Clyde Grange and Clyde Court multistorey flats, situated off Tong Road, which are the tallest buildings in the Wortley area.

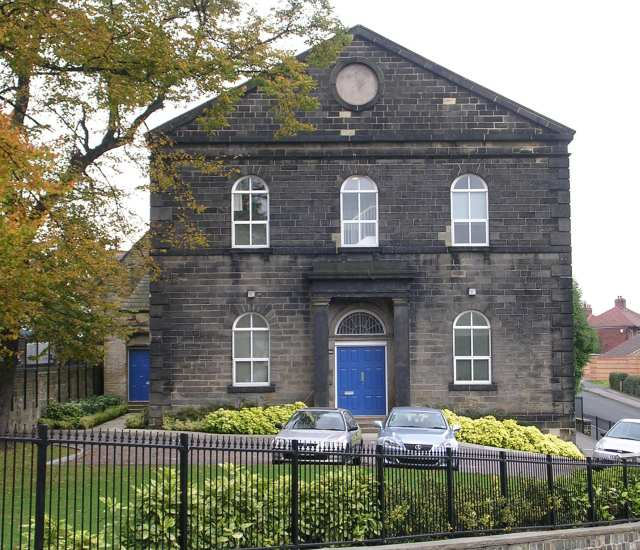
Former Wortley Wesleyan Methodist Chapel 1846–47

== Notable people ==
- Arthur Hiscoe (1848–1912), architect, was born in Wortley.
- Phil May English caricaturist (22 April 1864 – 5 August 1903) was born in Wortley.
- Brighton & Hove Albion footballer James Milner was born in Wortley.
- England and Manchester City footballer, Kalvin Phillips was born in Wortley

The area has associations with three first world war Victoria Cross recipients. George Sanders was born in New Wortley in 1894, while the grave of Arthur Poulter is located in New Wortley cemetery and the grave of Wilfred Edwards is in Oldfield Lane cemetery.

== Other pictures ==
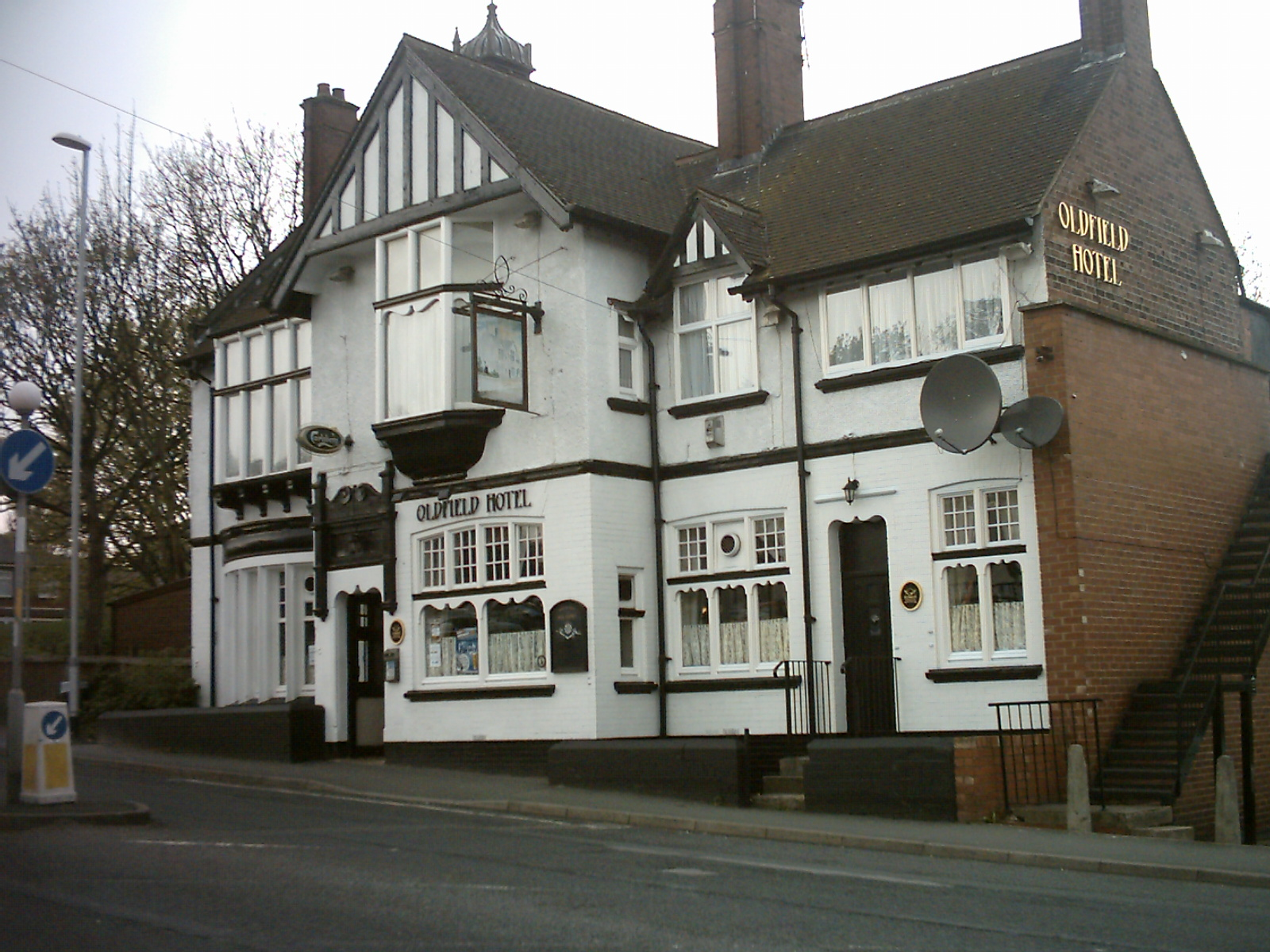
The Oldfield Hotel

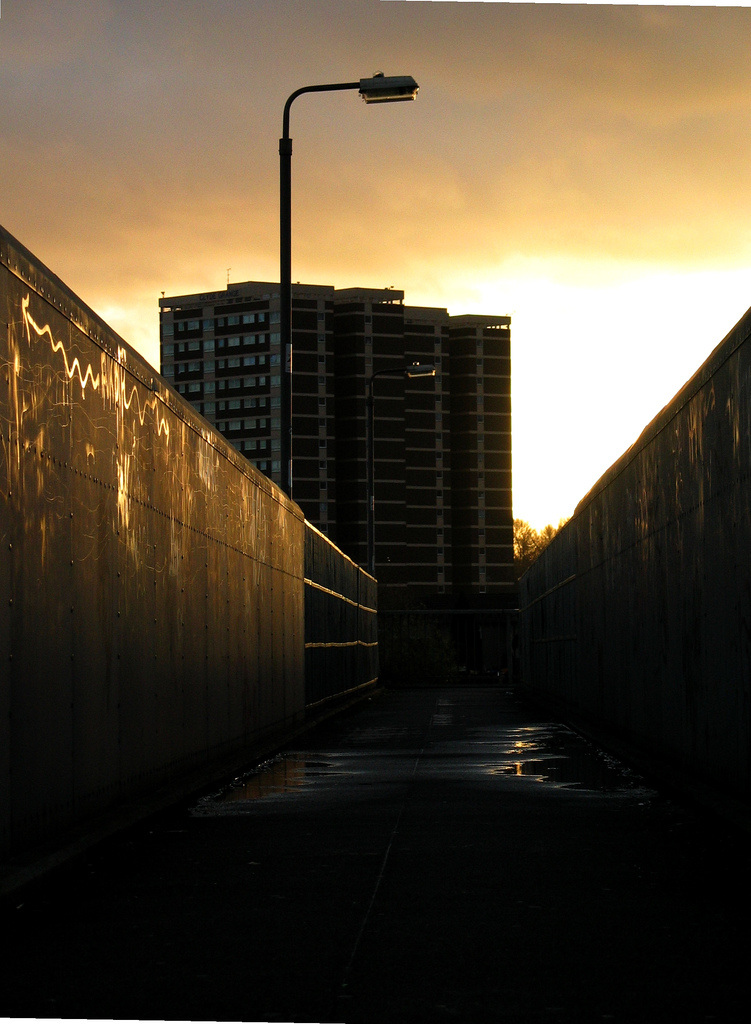
Clyde flats at sunset

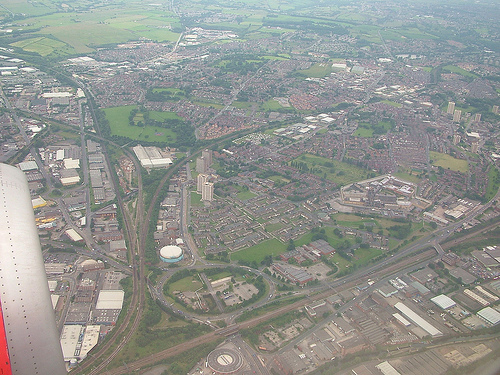
An aerial photograph of Wortley (and Armley to the right)

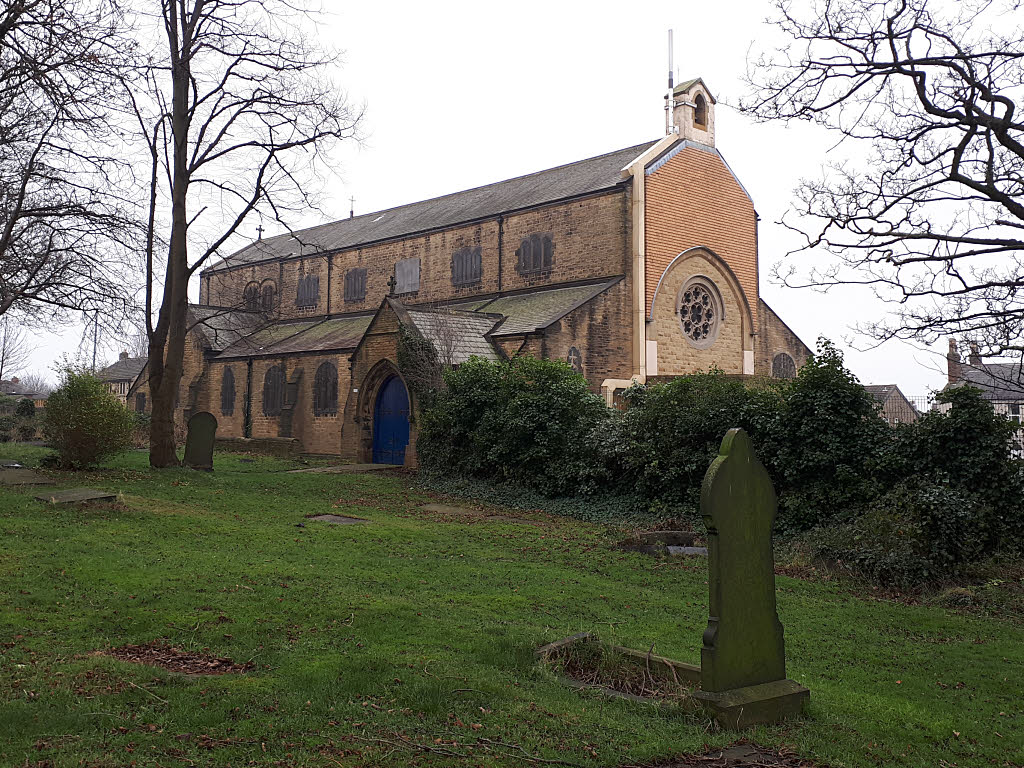
St Johns church, Lower Wortley

== See also ==
- Listed buildings in Leeds (Farnley and Wortley Ward)
