= West Leeds High School =

West Leeds High School: Specialist Technology College
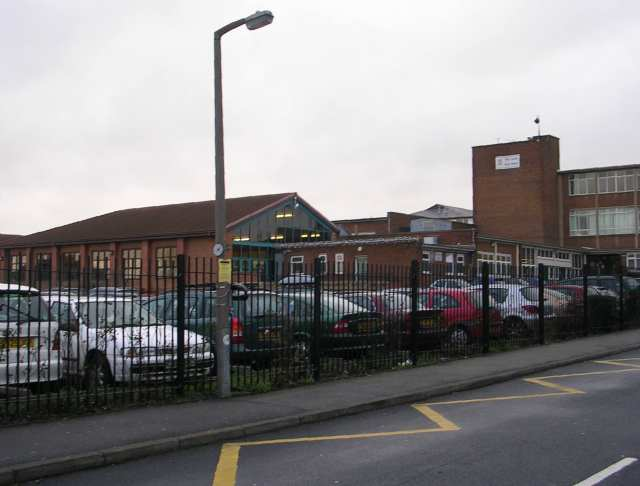

Location
- Congress Mount; Armley; Leeds, West Yorkshire, LS12 3DT; England; 53.7946°N 1.6064°W

Information
- Type: Comprehensive
- Motto: Non sibi sed ludo (Not for self but for the game)
- Established: September 1907
- Closed: August 2009 (demolished 2009/2010)
- Local authority: City of Leeds
- Specialist: Technology College
- Gender: Mixed
- Age: 11 to 18
- Enrolment: 1,119
- Website: www.westleeds.leeds.sch.uk/index.htm

West Leeds High School Specialist Technology College was a mixed comprehensive school located in Armley in Leeds, West Yorkshire, England. The school had around 1,200 students on roll from ages 11 to 18. The school was replaced with Swallow Hill Community College in 2009, following the merger between two local schools. After 102 years West Leeds High School closed and replaced by Swallow Hill.

== History ==
The school served the Armley, Bramley and Wortley areas of Leeds for 100 years.

=== Grammar school ===
The West Leeds High School opened on 7 September 1907 to improve standards in the city. The school was effectively two schools in one as both Girls and Boys were kept completely separate from each other.

By the 1950s the schools were known as West Leeds High School for Boys, with 500 boys, and West Leeds High School for Girls, with 450 girls. They were administered by the City of Leeds Education Committee. In 1959 the Girls School moved to a new campus and formed West Leeds Girls' High School on the Congress Mount Campus, with 550 girls. The Boys' school remained at the Tong Road Campus and formed West Leeds Boys' High School on Whingate, with 550 boys.

=== Comprehensive ===
The schools retained their name as 13–18 ages comprehensives. In 1993 the two schools merged to form West Leeds High School. The Congress Mount Campus was expanded in 1999 to become the size it is today. The boys' campus was sold off and converted to 66 apartments by North British Houseing and renamed as 'Old School Lofts'. The School also merged with Benjamin Gott High School, as that school had failing results and a falling pupil roll.

In 2004 the School successfully applied for Technology Status and became West Leeds High School Specialist Technology College. The School renovated some classrooms and fitted new SmartBoard software.

== Performance ==
The school increased its A*-C GCSE examination results from 19% in 2000 to 39% in 2006.

== Closure ==
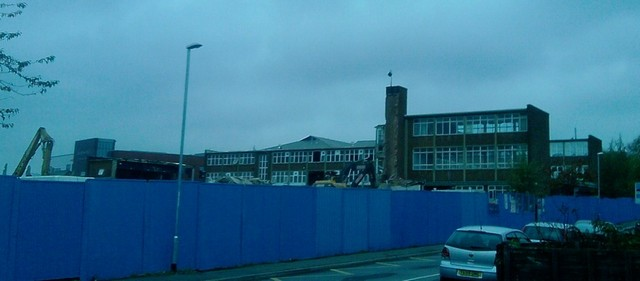
School Buildings Being Demolished

In 2006 the school was informed that it would be merging with another local school, Wortley High School, to form a new school because of the falling birth rate in the local area. Both schools opposed the merger saying that this would create more disadvantages than benefits. The merger was approved and construction of the new school began in 2008 on the West Leeds High School site, named, in May 2008, Swallow Hill Community College. In September 2009, After the new school was completed, the West Leeds buildings were closed. In October 2009 the school buildings began to be demolished to be replaced with sports fields for the new school. However the original 1907 school still stands, a listed building on Whingate where it was converted into apartments.

== Former teachers ==
- John Wishart (statistician), known for the Wishart distribution, taught mathematics from 1922 to 1924.
- Stanley Wilson, the leading British javelin thrower in the 1930s, taught PE at the school in the 1950s, 1960s and 1970s.

== Alumni ==
=== Boys' grammar school ===
- Joseph Hiley, Conservative MP from 1959 to 1974 for Pudsey
- Bill Bowes, Yorkshire and England cricketer
- Alex Lyon, Labour MP
- Colin McGreavy, Professor of Chemical Engineering from 1974 to 1997 at the University of Leeds
- John Riley, poet
- John Sheldon OBE, Joint General Secretary from 1996 to 2000 of the Public and Commercial Services Union, and General Secretary from 1993 to 1996 of the National Union of Civil and Public Servants, and from 1982 to 1988 of the Civil Service Union
- Phil Tate, musician
- Harold Fieldhouse KBE, Permanent Secretary responsible in 1948 for shepherding the three major Acts through Parliament creating the Welfare State
- Peter Robinson, crime novelist

=== Girls' grammar school ===
- Air Commodore Joan Metcalfe CB, Director of Royal Air Force Nursing Services (Princess Mary's Royal Air Force Nursing Service) from 1978 to 1981
