= Dixons Unity Academy =

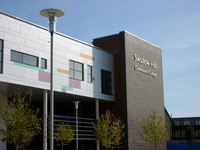

Location
- Whingate Road; Leeds, West Yorkshire, LS12 3DS; England
- Coordinates: 53.7946°N 1.6064°W

Information
- Type: Academy
- Motto: to make our best better
- Religious affiliation: Mixed
- Founder: Brian Knowles (Former Principal)
- Department for Education URN: 146363 Tables
- Ofsted: Reports
- Principal: Jill Atkins-Mackley
- Gender: Coeducational
- Age: 11 to 16
- Enrolment: 1280 (capacity)
- Colour: Light/Dark blue
- Website: Official website

Dixons Unity Academy, formerly Swallow Hill Community College is an educational secondary school Academy located in Leeds, West Yorkshire, England. It is sponsored by Dixons Academies Trust, having formerly been sponsored by Academies Enterprise Trust (AET).

The school became sponsored by Dixons Academies Trust in October 2018, following a negative Ofsted report, and changed its name.

== History ==
Swallow Hill Community College was built to replace two former schools: West Leeds High School and Wortley High School. West Leeds High School opened in 1907 based at the Old School Lofts building on Whingate. The school had separate Girls and Boys sites, with girls based initially on Congress Mount until they finally merged into a new school site in the 1940s.

In 2006 the local authority gained agreement from the Department for Children, Schools and Families to rebuild the schools. Construction begun in 2008, on the fields opposite to the West Leeds High School site and the £25 million build was completed by August 2009. It was decided to call the new school Swallow Hill, in order to reflect the local area of Swallow Hill (The area located between both predecessor schools).

In September 2009 Swallow Hill Community College opened with Bernard Knowles as the headteacher, using the two sites of West Leeds High School and Wortley High School. The main site with the older pupils was located on the fields of the previous West Leeds High School with a capacity for 1,200 students. The younger pupils (Years 7 and 8) were located at the site which had been previously the Wortley High School buildings, as the full school roll was 1600 pupils in 2009. Due to falling pupil numbers, in July 2011 the Wortley High School site was closed and all students were moved to the Upper Site, so that the school became a single-site school in September 2011. The old Wortley High School site was knocked down in 2013 and as of 2015 all that remains are the fields and tennis courts. By 2014 pupil numbers had dropped to 1,055 Pupil numbers continued to drop and in December 2015 the academy recorded on its website that its pupil numbers were 908 students.

In July 2013 Swallow Hill became an academy, sponsored by AET (Academies Enterprise Trust). The CEO of Academies Enterprise Trust, Ian Comfort summed up the purpose of AET's role by stating on the academy website:

Swallow Hill Community College is a key member of Academies Enterprise Trust (AET), the operational arm of the Greensward Charitable Trust, which is a federation of academies created to provide thousands of students/pupils with the best possible education.

Dixons Academies Trust took over the school and renamed it Dixons Unity Academy in October 2018.

== Academic standards ==
5GCSE A*-C (including English and Maths) taken from School and College Performance Tables December 2015
Academy Name	Joined AET	Left AET	2011	2012	2013	2014	2015	OFSTED Grade	DfE Warning or Pre Warning
Swallow Hill Community College	Sep 2013		31%	28%	30%	27%	22%	Inadequate	6 January 2015
National Maintained Schools			59%	59%	60%	57%	56%		

Cells coloured red represent 5GCSE A*-C (including English and Maths) results which are below the minimum standards expected by the Government floor target, or OFSTED grades which indicate that standards need to be improved or Department for Education letters stating that standards are 'unacceptably low.' Cells in darker grey indicate periods of time when the academy was not part of the Academies Enterprise Trust network of academies.

In January 2013 it was noted that Swallow Hill was amongst three schools in Leeds which achieved exam results which placed it in the lowest achieving 40 schools nationally. In the city of Leeds as a whole 55% of pupils achieved 5 GCSEs at grades A*-C (including English and Maths) but at Swallow Hill it was only 28%. The BBC also ranked the school 37th out of 38 local schools for both GCSE Value Added and for Sixth Form results

Once Swallow Hill Community College became an AET Academy, standards fell, as recorded by the official league table data above. Swallow Hill records its examination results in a more optimistic way than the official government league tables do. So, commenting on the 2014 results, the academy stated "Students at Swallow Hill achieved the academy’s best ever results this Summer despite a national picture which saw many schools’ results dip." The official Government league tables (as in the table above) record a drop in results of 3% in 2014.

On 6 January 2015 Paul Smith, the DFE Regional Schools' Commissioner wrote to AET expressing concerns about standards at Swallow Hill Community College, especially as recorded in the 2014 exam results. He stated

the Secretary of State considers that the standards of performance at Swallow Hill Academy are unacceptably low and are likely to remain so... This year’s results were poor... Attainment and progress remain a long way below what is being achieved with similar ability students elsewhere.

On 3 February 2015 OFSTED inspected the academy and graded it as overall Inadequate because of poor achievement. OFSTED stated

During the academy’s first year, students’ achievement was inadequate. In particular, they did not make enough progress in mathematics and science and standards remained well below average at the end of Year 11. Until recently, pupil premium funding has not been used effectively enough to help disadvantaged students. Consequently, they made inadequate progress. Teaching is not consistently good enough in all subjects...

The 2015 examination results, as indicated in the table above, showed further decline in the headline figure of students achieving 5GCSEs A-C (including English and Maths). Commenting on the 2015 exam results the academy initially declined to release exam results at all, and posted the following statement on its website, which was still up in December 2015,

The drop in the headline figure in 2015, after two years of improving results, was unexpected and we appear to have been caught up in some nationally publicised issues in both English and mathematics GCSE. As a Trust we are working hard with the examination boards to understand the increase in grade boundaries and we currently have a significant number of remarks being considered. We are also contesting moderated results after a track record of both accuracy and tolerance within coursework. Full results will be published against national outcomes by entry in mid October.

The 2015 initial reports of A level results indicated that 13 students had passed qualifications at the academy. Official league tables show that Sixth Form students achieved on average an E grade for each qualification.

== Extra Curricular matters ==
In order to improve students employability, Business Mentoring of younger pupils took place at the academy in 2014 Recognising the importance of broadening the curriculum to meet the needs of the many lower ability pupils the academy has developed a number of outreach programmes. In 2014 Swallow Hill embarked upon a partnership with the Leeds College of Building to provide more vocational courses for students unable to access the full curriculum. In May 2015 pupils from Swallow Hill participated in a Young Persons Fire Training scheme.

In March 2011 Rachel Reeves, MP, visited Swallow Hill and promoted visits to Auschwitz

In order to attract staff to the Academy AET stated in its adverts

In each of the AET academies, you will benefit from visionary, inspirational and dynamic leadership and be empowered to develop your own skills with access to world-class CPD and Talent Management programmes. You will also be offered membership of a private health cash plan, the Ford Advantage Scheme and be entitled to Childcare Vouchers.

However, in response to community perceptions of high staff turnover, a 2015 Freedom of Information Request showed that the academy had a staff turnover of 27% of teachers.

A minor local controversy erupted upon the merger of the schools when a 6th Form pupil made a video of complaints and posted it on YouTube to complain about the poor standards in the school. He highlighted concerns about 6 fights in 2 weeks and a number of timetable irregularities. Attached to the video clips in question were pictures and comments added by other students, added in different years, to highlight concerns about bullying and other matters within the academy.

The academy is particularly proud of its hygiene, celebrating the achievement of a 5* rating for food hygiene again in 2015.

== The role of the sponsor ==
Academies Enterprise Trust support for Academies at the local level is led by the AET Regional Director of Education (known as a RDE). The 2014 OFSTED report about AET explained that ‘some academy leaders said that there was too much variability in the support and challenge offered by Regional Directors employed by AET.'. Nevertheless, there are some positive comments about the efforts and intentions of the sponsor which can be found in reports, but with the direction of results so clearly downwards, it was not surprising in 2015 to find an increasing amount of concern being expressed.

On 3 February 2014, as a result of seeing plans for a joint venture which would have involved staffing changes at all AET schools, including Swallow Hill Community College, Averil Chambers, on behalf of the GMB Union, made a series of criticisms of AET. She stated

Given that AET has a history of financial irregularities I wouldn’t trust them to look after my cat, let alone millions of pounds of public money

In 2015 The DfE Schools' Commissioner Paul Smith, also expressed concerns about AET's ability to bring about the necessary improvements at Swallow Hill Community College. He stated

I have concerns about the capacity of Academies Enterprise Trust to deliver the sustained improvements required. The academy is isolated from other academies in the trust and the sponsor has been slow to act, though I recognise that some support is now being given to the improve maths teaching. The Secretary of State and I are therefore satisfied that the standards of performance at Swallow Hill Academy are unacceptably low, and that this will remain an issue unless the Secretary of State exercises her powers under the terms of the Agreement.

When OFSTED carried out a monitoring visit in June 2015, they expressed concerns about Academies Enterprise Trust and its plans for the school. OFSTED stated

The sponsor’s statement of action, however, is not fit for purpose. It is not clear when various actions listed are to take place or what the intended impact will be. Nor is the plan clear enough about the roles different external advisers will play in monitoring the work of the academy.

In December 2015 the Times Educational Supplement (TES) reported that AET has received 14 warning letters from the government about unacceptably low standards in its academies and that this is more than any other chain has received. Commenting more generally the TES said

...the situation at the Academies Enterprise Trust (AET), which runs 68 schools throughout the country, has become so serious that representatives from the Department for Education now sit in on the trust's board meetings. The government has said in the past that it makes such a move if it has "concerns" about an Academy chain.
