= Durford Wood =

Settlement in West Sussex, England

Coordinates: 51.020634°N 0.889296°W

- Location within West Sussex
- OS grid reference: SU7958126208
- Civil parish: Rogate
- District: West Sussex
- Shire county: West Sussex
- Region: South East
- Country: England
- Sovereign state: United Kingdom
- Dialling code: 01730
- Police: Sussex
- Fire: West Sussex
- Ambulance: South East Coast
- UK Parliament: Chichester

Durford Wood is a scattered settlement in the civil parish of Rogate in West Sussex, England. The settlement, close to that at Durford to the south, is situated in woodland close to and mostly southwest of the Hampshire-West Sussex border and the B2070 London Road between Rake, West Sussex and Petersfield, 5 miles (8.0 km) to the southwest. It is in the South Downs National Park.

== Description ==
North of the A272, and west of the B2070 London Road, Durford Wood is an extent of woodland in which an estate of substantial dwellings was established in the early 20th century. It is managed by Durford Wood Landowners Limited, established in 1933. Before the establishment of the estate, the only habitation in Durford Wood was the 17th century Woodreeves Cottage, now a listed building.

One of the properties, Durford Edge, has an Arts and Crafts garden designed by Unsworth and Triggs with a parterre designed by Gertrude Jekyll. One of the features of the grounds is a decommissioned Harrier jump jet.

== See also ==
- Durford
- Dureford Abbey
