= Durford =

Hamlet in West Sussex, England

Coordinates: 51.00°N 0.88°W

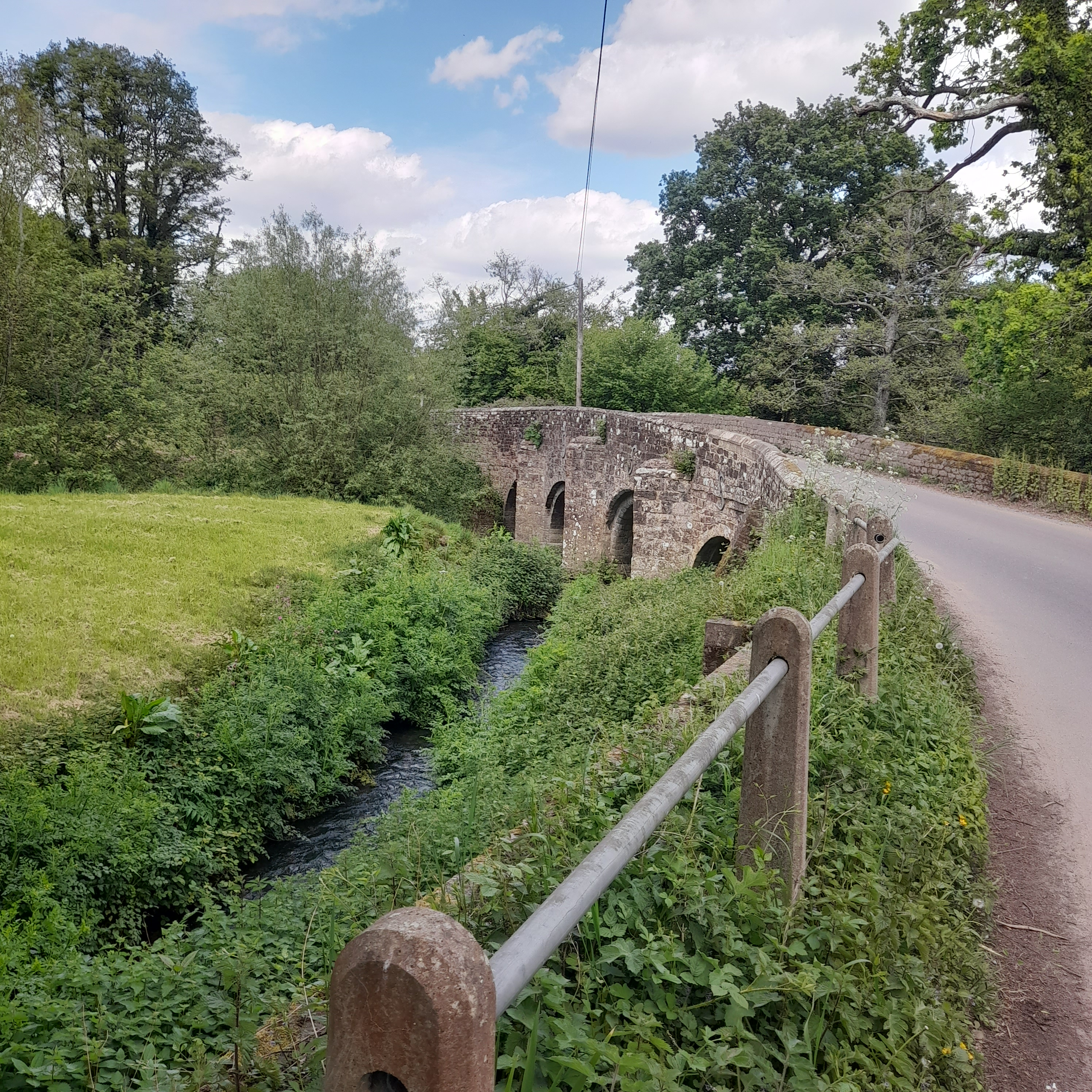
- East view of Durford Bridge

- Location within West Sussex
- OS grid reference: SU7823
  - London: 60 miles (97 km) NE
- Civil parish: Rogate
- District: Chichester
- Shire county: West Sussex
- Region: South East
- Country: England
- Sovereign state: United Kingdom
- Police: Sussex
- Fire: West Sussex
- Ambulance: South East Coast
- UK Parliament: Chichester

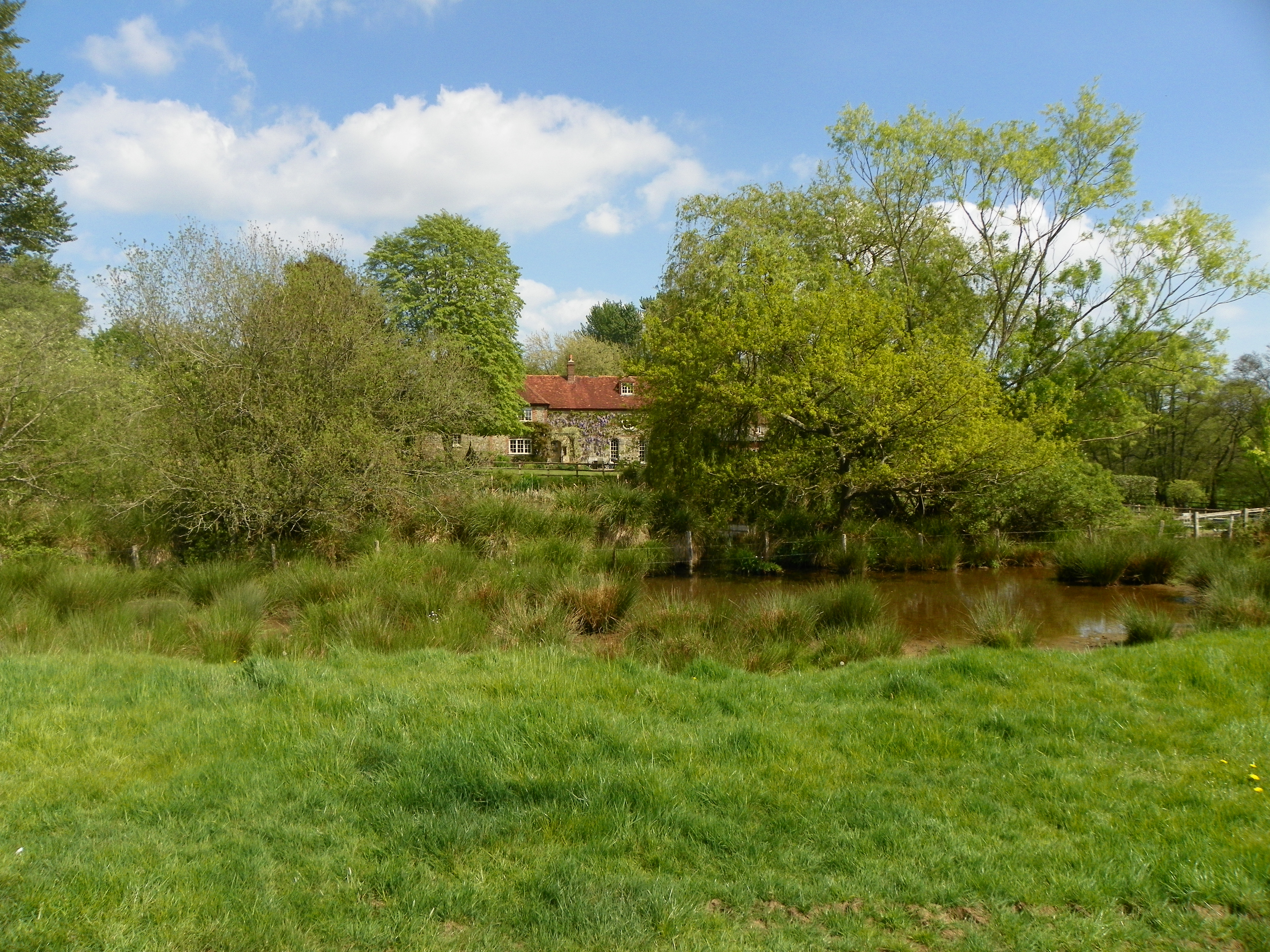
Durford Abbey Farm and ponds

Durford is a settlement in the civil parish of Rogate, in the Chichester district, in West Sussex, southern England, close to the Hampshire border and Petersfield, and the east-west route A272. The River Rother runs through it. Nearby villages are Sheet, Hill Brow, Rogate and South Harting, all of which have grown over the centuries whilst Durford, despite being close to a main road, has remained isolated.

== History ==
The settlement is not mentioned in the 1086 Domesday Survey, but was in the area covered by the Hundred of Dumpford, and would probably have been included in the listing for the most populous and nearest settlement in the hundred, Harting, where nine mills were mentioned in the survey. The mill at Durford was at least as early as the establishment of Durford Abbey, a Premonstratensian monastery, in about 1190, so would probably have been much earlier. The mill was the principal mill for Rogate, and was granted to the abbey by Henry II. In the 16th century the river was described as a "strong" stream, and was the last to be working when others in the area stopped "for want of water". The mill and the now-listed Mill House passed into private hands in 1609, and it was described on an 1898 map as a corn mill. There are only fragmentary remains of the abbey and mill buildings, as well as a graveyard.

The abbey was closed by King Henry VIII in 1535 prior to the dissolution of the monasteries, and in 1585 it belonged to his daughter Queen Elizabeth I, who leased it to Henry Mervyn. It was subsequently incorporated into Durford Farm, but in 1784 a new house was built by Lord Stawell on the old site. Some medieval remains persist, including a graveyard. The abbey is a Scheduled monument, with some remains being listed structures. A great deal of detail about the former abbey is recorded by Historic England and also by British History Online; the site includes a threshing barn with a water wheel and associated drive shafts.

In the 15th century, Durford had been referred to as a manor, and again in the 16th, but the ownership of the land that was once under the control of the abbey was frequently in dispute, even until the mid-19th century.

When turnpike trusts were established in the 1700s and 1800s to raise funds to maintain the roads, the highway from Petersfield to Midhurst (now the A272) was run by the Midhurst and Sheet Bridge Turnpike Trust (established in 1825). A toll house at Durford still exists, and is a listed building.

== Geography ==
Durford is a rural hamlet in the South Downs National Park. It is surrounded by agricultural land.

The western River Rother flows through the hamlet from west to east, and the mill race to the north of the river is evident on maps from 1896. To the west of Durford is Durford Bridge, built about 1600 with four semi-circular arches. It was restored in 1924 and is a scheduled ancient monument. It carries the road (Durford Lane) to Harting. The Rother is a chalk stream, and 17 species of fish were recorded at Durford Bridge up to 2026. The river is not navigable until it reaches The Wharf, in Midhurst.

There still is a Durford Road leaving Petersfield towards Durford, but the coming of the Midhurst Railways and other developments closed off that route in the 19th century. The railway passed close to the south of Durford on its way to Midhurst.

North of the A272 is Durford Wood, an extent of woodland in which an estate of substantial dwellings was established in the early 20th century. It is managed by Durford Wood Landowners Limited, established in 1933. Before the establishment of the estate, the only habitation in Durford Wood was the 17th century Woodreeves Cottage, now a listed building.

== See also ==
- Dureford Abbey
