= Inigo Triggs =

English architect and author

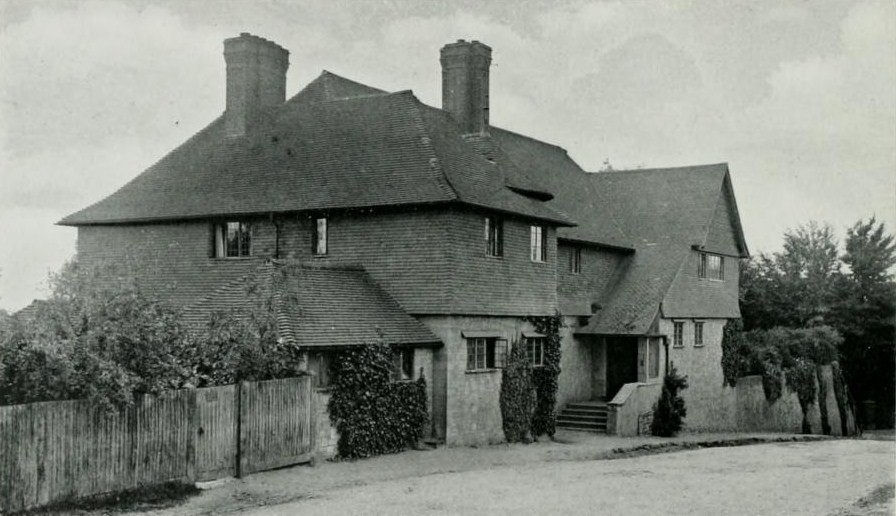
"Broad Dene", Haslemere, designed by Inigo Triggs and W. F. Unsworth for the artist Walter Tyndale, built in 1900.

Henry Inigo Triggs (1876–1923) was an English country house architect and designer of formal gardens, and author.

== Family life ==
Harry Benjamin Inigo Triggs was born in Chiswick, London, on 28 February 1876, to James Triggs, carpet agent, and his wife Celia Anne, née Bryant. The architect Inigo Jones was a distant relative.

His older brother was Arthur Bryant Triggs (1868–1936), born in Chelsea, who in 1887 emigrated to Australia, becoming a wealthy New South Wales grazier (known as The Sheep King) and collector of art, books and coins.

== Career ==
Triggs designed many formal gardens and later some country houses, mostly in southern England. He specialised in historical research and in re-creating gardens of the past. His books influenced the Italian mode of the Arts and Crafts style in England.

In 1906 he was awarded the Godwin Bursary, presenting two reports: "The planning of public squares and open spaces" (76 pages), relating to the cities of Paris, Berlin, Vienna and Munich, including public monuments and fountains; "Le Petit Palais, Paris" (20 pages), a detailed description of the Musée des Beaux-Arts building, Avenue Winston Churchill, designed by Charles Girault and built between 1897 and 1900.

In the 1910s Triggs was in partnership with the architect William Frederick Unsworth (1851–1912), and his son Gerald Unsworth (1883–1946), in Petersfield, Hampshire. W. F. Unsworth had previously designed the Shakespeare Memorial Theatre in Stratford-upon-Avon in 1879, which was destroyed by fire in 1926 and replaced in 1932 with the present Royal Shakespeare Theatre.

In 1919, Triggs was tasked by The Whiteley Homes Trust to plan and supervise the landscaping of the area around Whiteley Village, Walton on Thames, Surrey, constructing tree-lined avenues and turfed walks, with fruiting trees and shrubs and lavender borders. He also designed Cooper's Bridge at Bramshott, the War Memorial in Petersfield High Street in 1922, and the gardens at Durford Edge in Durford Wood, near Petersfield.

== Personal life ==
In 1907 he married Gladys Claire Hill, sister of Mabel Frances Hill of Taormina, a fashionable resort in Sicily. Triggs designed La Guardiola for his sister-in-law. At this point he wrote The Art of Garden Design in Italy.

In 1910 Triggs bought the property then called Fry's Farm, in Liphook, Hampshire. He re-designed the farmhouse and gardens as his home and renamed it Little Boarhunt, based on a legend about King John hunting boar in the district. The house is now a Grade II listed building, being a representative romantic house of the Arts and Crafts Movement.

Triggs died on 9 April 1923 in Taormina. A memorial tablet is dedicated to him in St Mary's Church, Bramshott.

== Houses ==
- Little Boarhunt House and gardens Liphook, Hampshire (1910) including a sunken Elizabethan garden.
- The Rectory Liphook, Hampshire (1912)
- Rookswood's Windrush Lodge Nazeing, Essex (1913)
- Homefield Nazeing, Essex
- Fulmer Chase, Fulmer, Buckinghamshire. Originally known as Stoke Barn, the house and gardens are credited to architect Gerald Unsworth and Inigo Triggs. The gardens include a substantial rock garden and ponds. (circa 1912).

== Gardens ==
- Barrow Court, Somerset (1890)
- Chillington Hall, Staffordshire (1911)
- Saighton Grange (now Abbey Gate College) Cheshire (1901)
- Restalls, Steep, Petersfield, Hampshire. The home of W F Unsworth, Inigo Triggs' business partner. (circa 1905)
- Garden Hill, Steep, Petersfield. The house was designed by W F Unsworth. The garden is believed to be by Triggs.
- Ashford Chace, Steep, Petersfield, Hampshire. near Petersfield, Hampshire, for Aubyn Trevor-Battye (1912)
- Durford Edge, Durford Wood, West Sussex
- Fulmer Chase, Fulmer, Buckinghamshire. Originally known as Stoke Barn, the house and gardens are credited to architect Gerald Unsworth and Inigo Triggs. The gardens include a substantial rock garden and ponds. (circa 1912).

== Memorials ==
- *Steep War Memorial. This was the first village war memorial to be dedicated in the country. It contains the name of Edward Thomas, the Poet. It is listed of Historic Importance Grade II.
- Bedford Park War Memorial, outside St Michael and All Angels, Bedford Park, London (c.1920)
- Haslemere War Memorial (c. 1920)

== Books ==
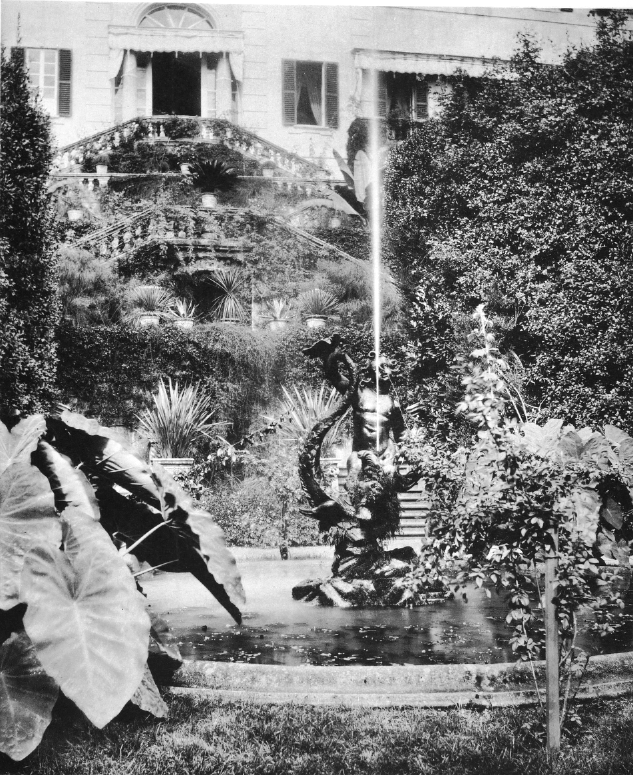
Villa Carlotta as depicted in The Art of Garden Design in Italy (1906) by Inigo Triggs

- Some Architectural Works of Inigo Jones (1901) A series of measured drawings and other illustrations together with descriptive notes; a biographical sketch and list of his authentic works, B T Batsford publishing. With Henry Tanner.
- Formal Gardens in England and Scotland (1902) Their Planning And Arrangement, Architectural And Ornamental Features, B T Batsford publishing, 63 pages. Republished 1988.
- The Art of Garden Design in Italy (1906) Longmans publishing, 135 pages. Republished 1942 and 2007.
- Town Planning, Past, Present and Possible (1909) with 173 illustrations, Methuen & Co, 334 pages. Second edition in 1911.
- Garden Craft in Europe (1913) C Scribner's Sons publishing, 332 pages. Republished 1933 and 2008.

== Sources ==
- RIBA Journal, 1923, volume 30, page 431 – Obituary.
- Country life, 1995, volume 189, number 43, 26 Oct, pages 58–61 -"Designs for a garden – formal informality" by Diana Baskervyle-Glegg, on Triggs' Edwardian garden designs.
