= Park Row, Leeds =

Street in Leeds, England

Coordinates: 53.7979°N 1.5471°W

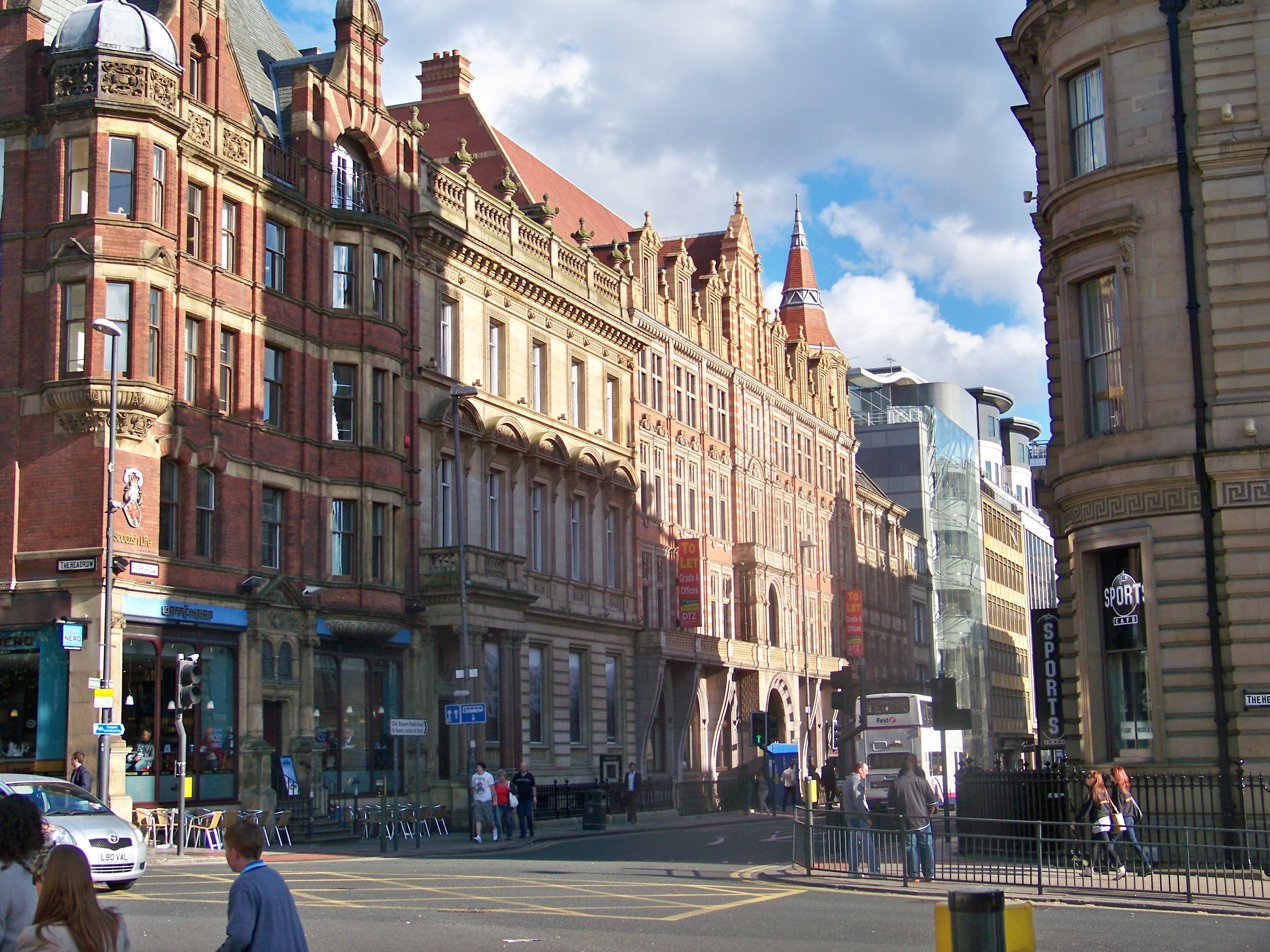
Park Row

Park Row is a street in Leeds city centre, West Yorkshire, England. It divides the main financial districts from the main retail districts and forms a spine between City Square and The Headrow, two of Leeds' most sought-after addresses. The street forms the western flank of the Public Transport Box, and as such is mostly reserved for buses, taxis and cyclists, especially since reconfiguration 2020-2021 as part of city-centre-wide traffic infrastructure changes.

Between the 1860s and the turn of the millennium, it was a prime business street, with the main banks, some insurance companies and several other major financial and business services employers such as Pinsent Masons and Deloitte. Since then, it has become much more mixed, with a return of some residential occupiers and a range of bars and restaurants taking over banking halls and other ground floors.

The architecture of the street is representative of changing property demand and architectural fashions. Styles range from the earliest purpose-built banks and offices of the 1860s through to late 20th century replacements.

It is named Park Row because it was created as the eastern boundary of the long gone Manorial Park, used by the Lord for hunting.

== History ==
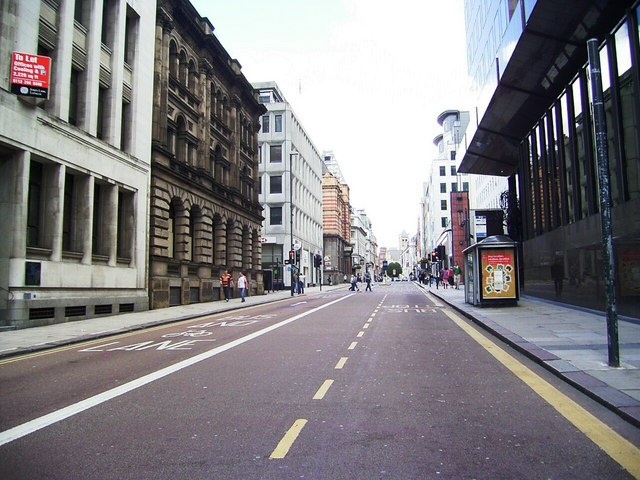
Park Row, looking towards Cookridge Street and The Headrow

Twenty-three houses were built on the east side of Park Row between 1767 and 1776.

In 1821, on a site on the west side, Leeds Philosophical & Literary Society opened its purpose-built Philosophical Hall with a lecture hall, library and museum. The building and parts of the collection were damaged by German bombs in the Second World War. The Museum closed in 1965 and the site was redeveloped as the Midland Bank - later HSBC. After some years in temporary accommodation, in 2008 the museum collection was re-housed in the former Mechanics' Institute, now Leeds City Museum in Millennium Square.

From the 1830s onwards, early service sector businesses started to use space in some of the Georgian houses. By the middle of the nineteenth century, some houses were redeveloped as purpose-built offices, providing accommodation more suited to growing enterprises and giving a chance to express company identity in the architecture. Some of these buildings were redeveloped during the twentieth century. A few have been redeveloped again since then, or have been converted to uses other than offices.

Britain's first permanent traffic lights were installed on Park Row at the junction with Bond Street in 1928 by Herbert Thorp.

== Entertainment ==
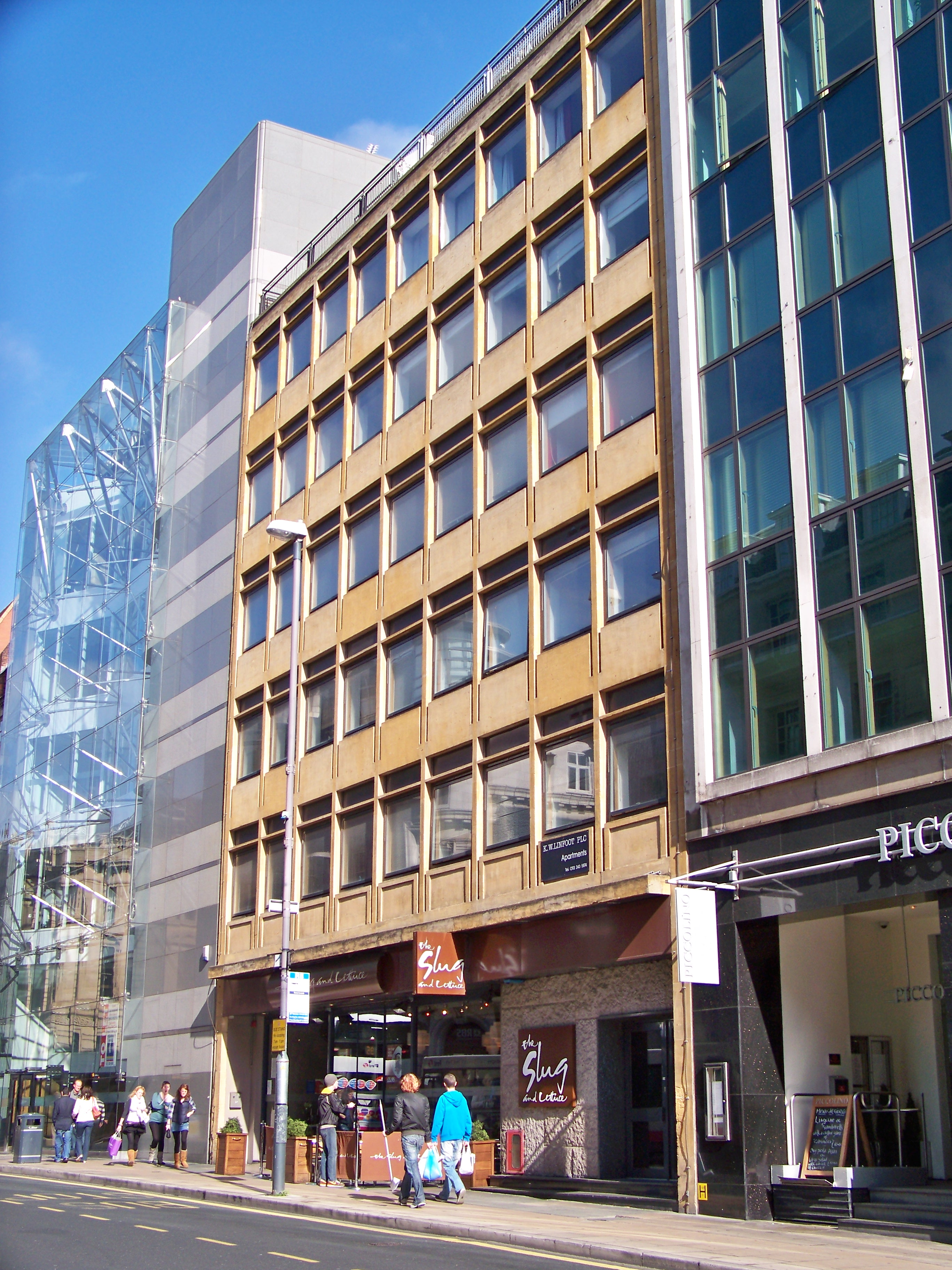
Park Row has many restaurants

Although during the day it is mainly concerned with the financial industry, at night it is at the centre of Leeds' nightlife culture. There is a high concentration of high-end restaurants along Park Row, as well as a number of cafes.

== See also ==
- Abtech House
