= Abtech House =

Historic building at 18 Park Row, Leeds, UK

Coordinates: 53°47′56″N 1°32′49″W

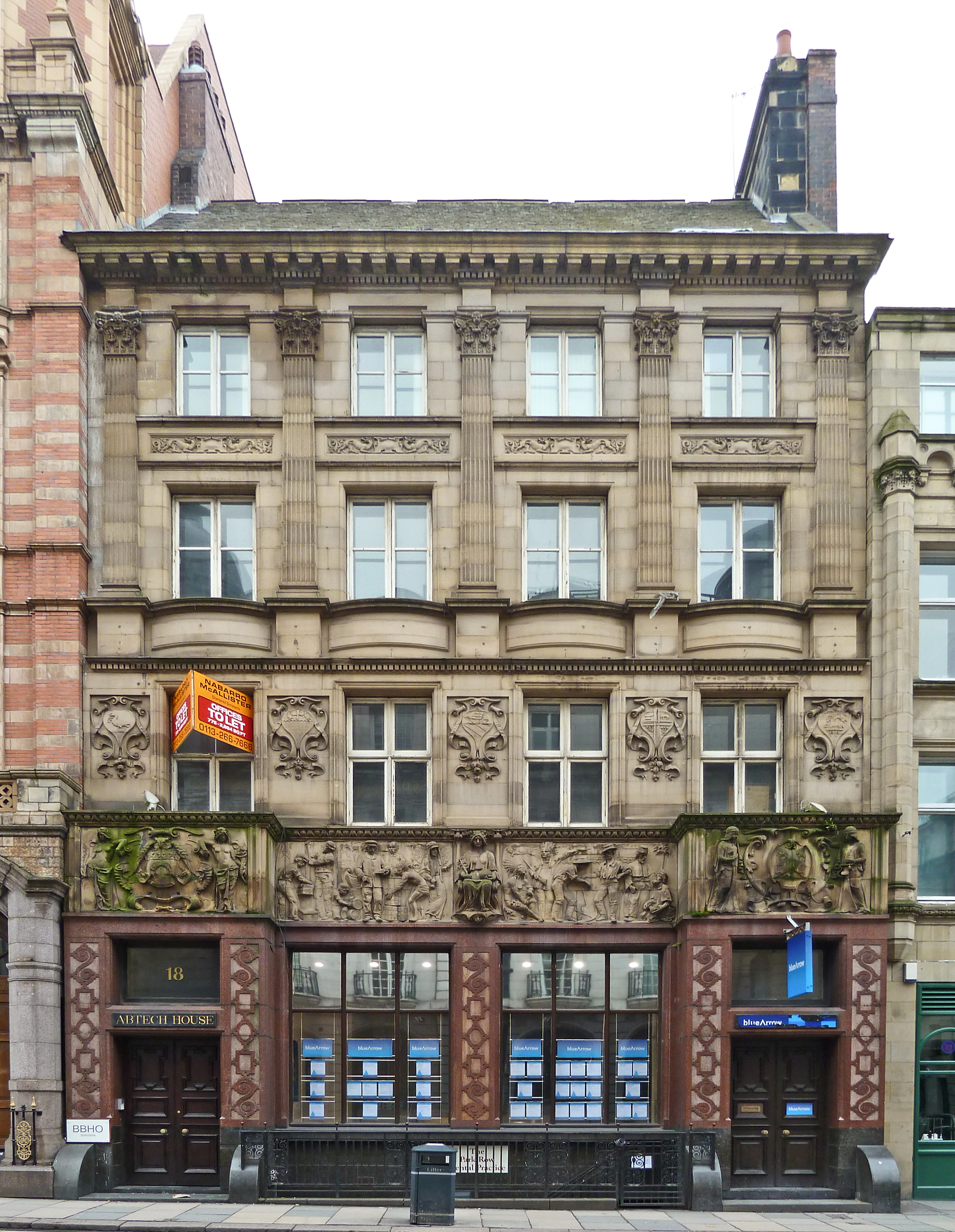
11 Park Row in 2011

18 Park Row, Leeds, once known as Abtech House and more recently as Kenneth Hodgson House, is a Grade II listed building in Leeds, West Yorkshire, England. The building on the east side of Park Row, Leeds was built as offices for the West Riding Union Bank.

== Description ==
The building was designed in the late 19th century by the Leeds architect Edward John Dodgshun, from the firm Oliver and Dodgshun. An illustration was published on page 28 of the Academy Architecture and Architectural Review, volume 21, published in 1902. Tt is constructed from stone ashlars, with four bays, and projecting entrances in the left and right bays. It has four stories, and was altered in the 20th century to add a fifth floor in the attic under a slate roof.

The ground floor façade is decorated with a strapwork pattern in red granite. Between the ground and first floors is a deep relief stone frieze designed by architect Joseph Thewlis, with has a central seated figure of Minerva as the goddess of commerce holding a globe and a caduceus, flanked by rectangular panels depicting scenes of colonial trading to either side. To the left is a panel with two workmen unloading a ship, a boy with a barrel, a man with a book, a black man carrying a bale, an East Asian man gesturing, and a man in Middle Eastern headdress and robes carrying a basket. To the right are two men in Native American feather headdresses, and others working to build a railway.

Further relief carvings above each entrances show, to the left, the coat of arms of Leeds (fleece with three stars in chief) supported by two women and, to the right, the coat of arms of Huddersfield (chevron with three towers, between three sheep) supported by two men. Either side of the four windows on the first floor are panels with five further carved municipal coats of arms: Liverpool (liver bird), Dewsbury (owls and cross in chief), Manchester (sailing ship in chief), Bury (quarters with anvil, fleece, shuttles, papyrus), and Preston (lamb of god).

Grand order pilasters rise through the second and third floors to Corinthian capitals with a modillion cornice above, with blank curved panels below the second floor windows which were originally intended to be carved to show the four words "West Riding Union Bank", and further carved panels of curvilinear dragons below the third floor windows.

== History ==
The building was not completed until after the West Riding Union Bank had been acquired by the Lancashire and Yorkshire Bank in 1902. After another merger in 1928, the building continued as a branch of the Bank of Liverpool and Martins, but closed in 1933 (as there was already a branch of Martins Bank diagonally opposite, on the west side of the road at 28 Park Row, in a building is also a Grade II listed; it was later a branch of Barclays Bank, and is now a Wetherspoons public house named after another local bank, Beckett's Bank, which became part of Westminster Bank in 1921.)

In the early 20th century, upper parts of the building were also occupied by the architects FJ Sharr, and by firm of architects who designed the building, Oliver and Dodgshun. Towards the end of the 20th century, it was offices for the Blue Arrow employment agency, and the ground floor is now The Bootlegger Cocktail Bar, with a dental practice in the basement. It was renamed in 2013 after businessman Kenneth Hodgson, whose company Westcourt acquired the building in 2012. It became a Grade II listed building in 1976.

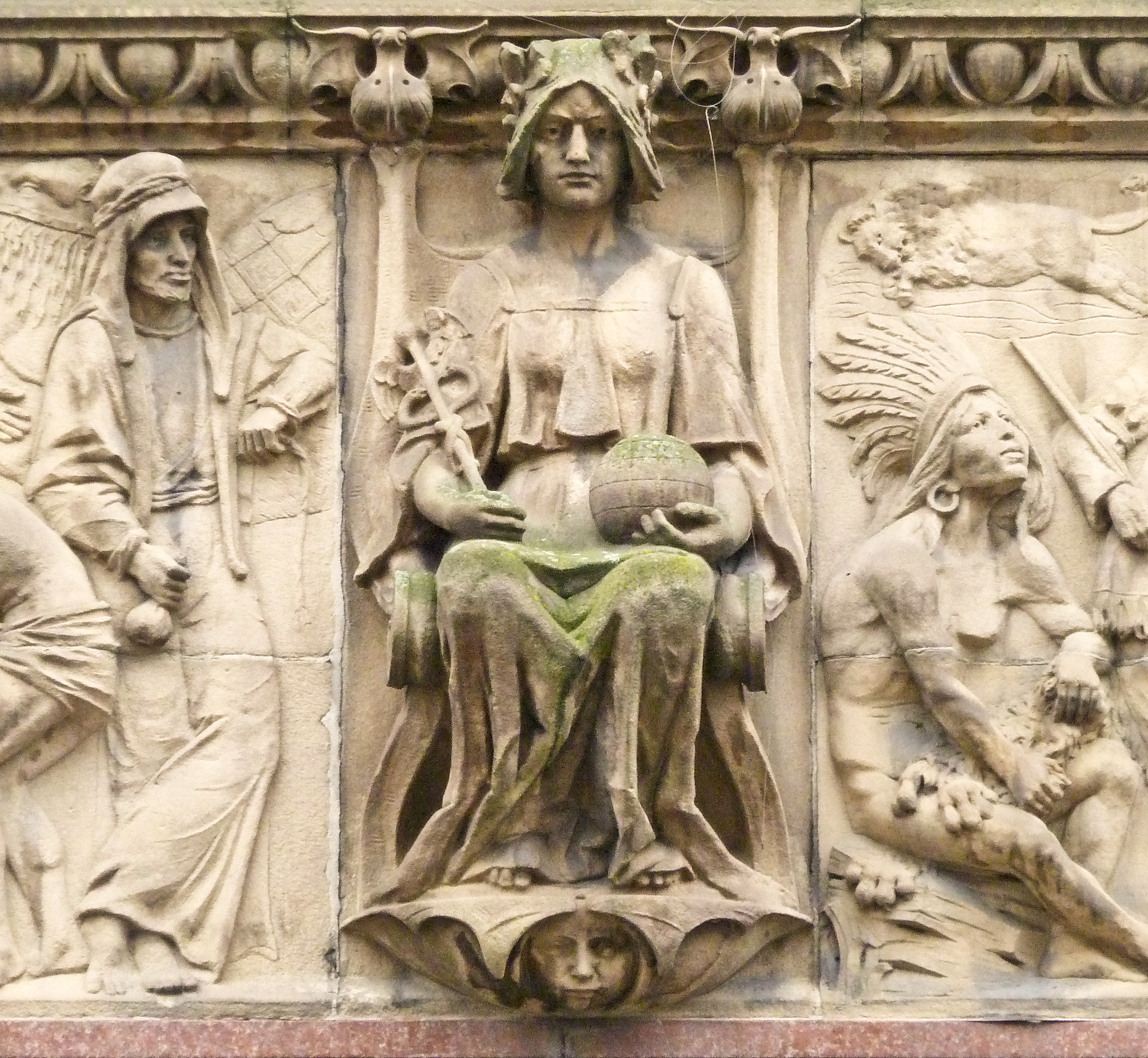
Detail of carving: Minerva

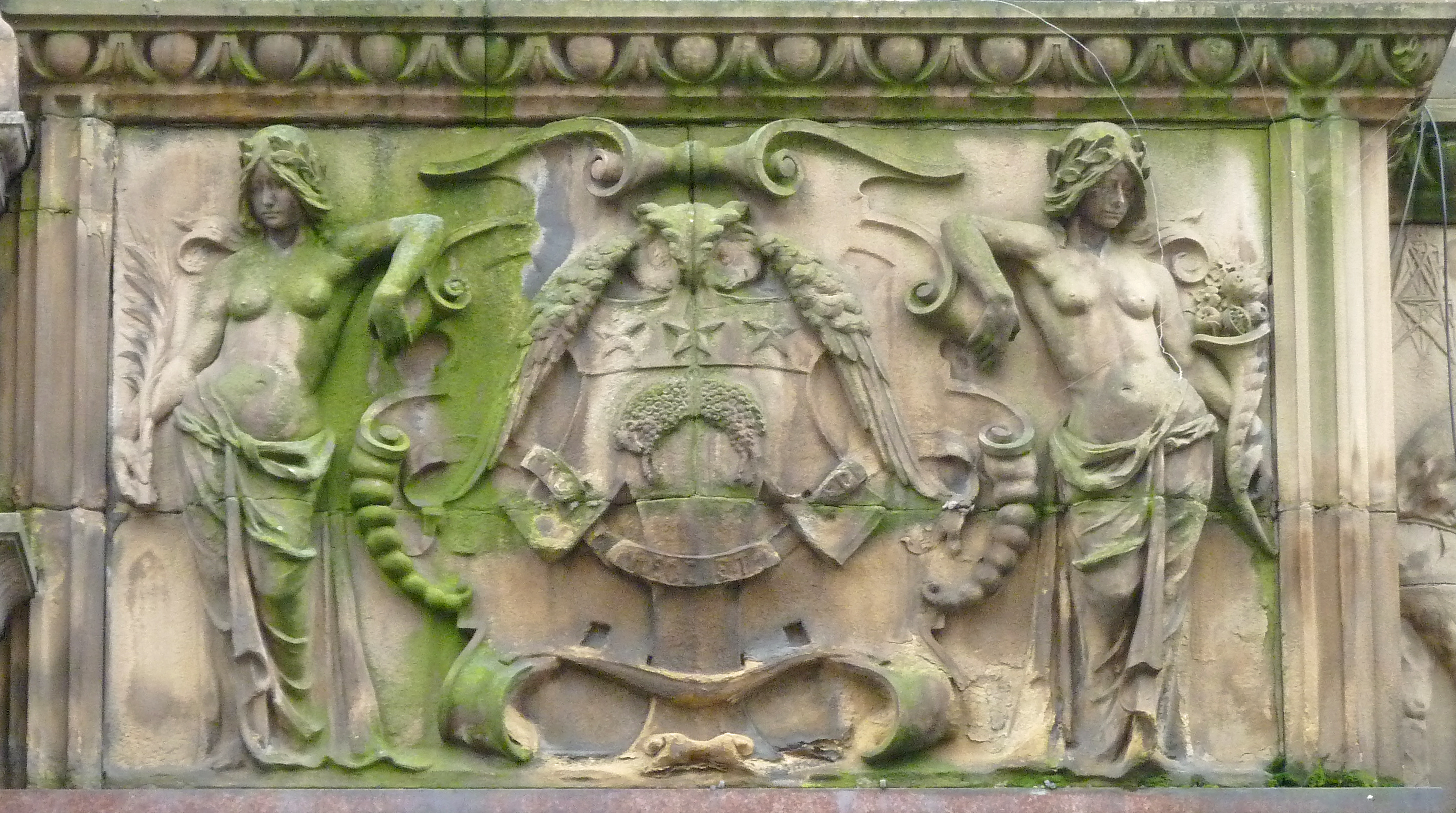
Detail of carving: arms of Leeds

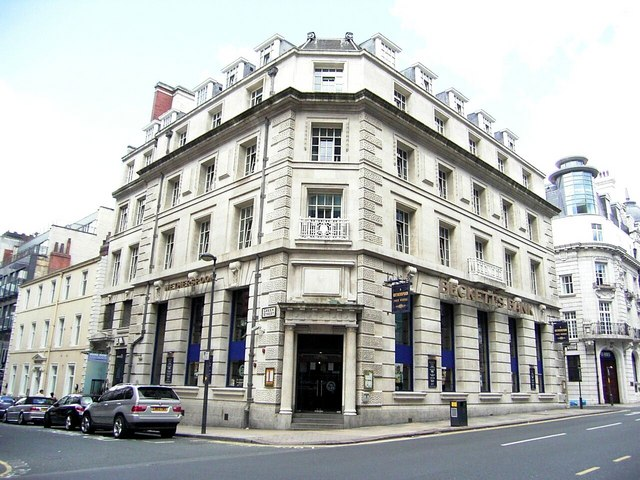
28 Park Row in 2007
