= Arthur Bryant Triggs =

Australian grazier and collector

Arthur Bryant Triggs (30 January 1868 – 9 September 1936) was an Australian grazier and collector.

== Family life ==
Triggs was born in Chelsea, London, the son of James Triggs, carpet agent, and his wife Celia Anne, née Bryant. His younger brother was Inigo Triggs, the English country house architect and garden designer and author. The architect Inigo Jones was a distant relative.

== Career ==
In 1887 Arthur immigrated to Australia, becoming a wealthy New South Wales grazier (known as The Sheep King) and collector of art, books and coins.
