= St Michael and All Angels, Bedford Park =

St Michael and All Angels
- The Parish Church of St Michael and All Angels
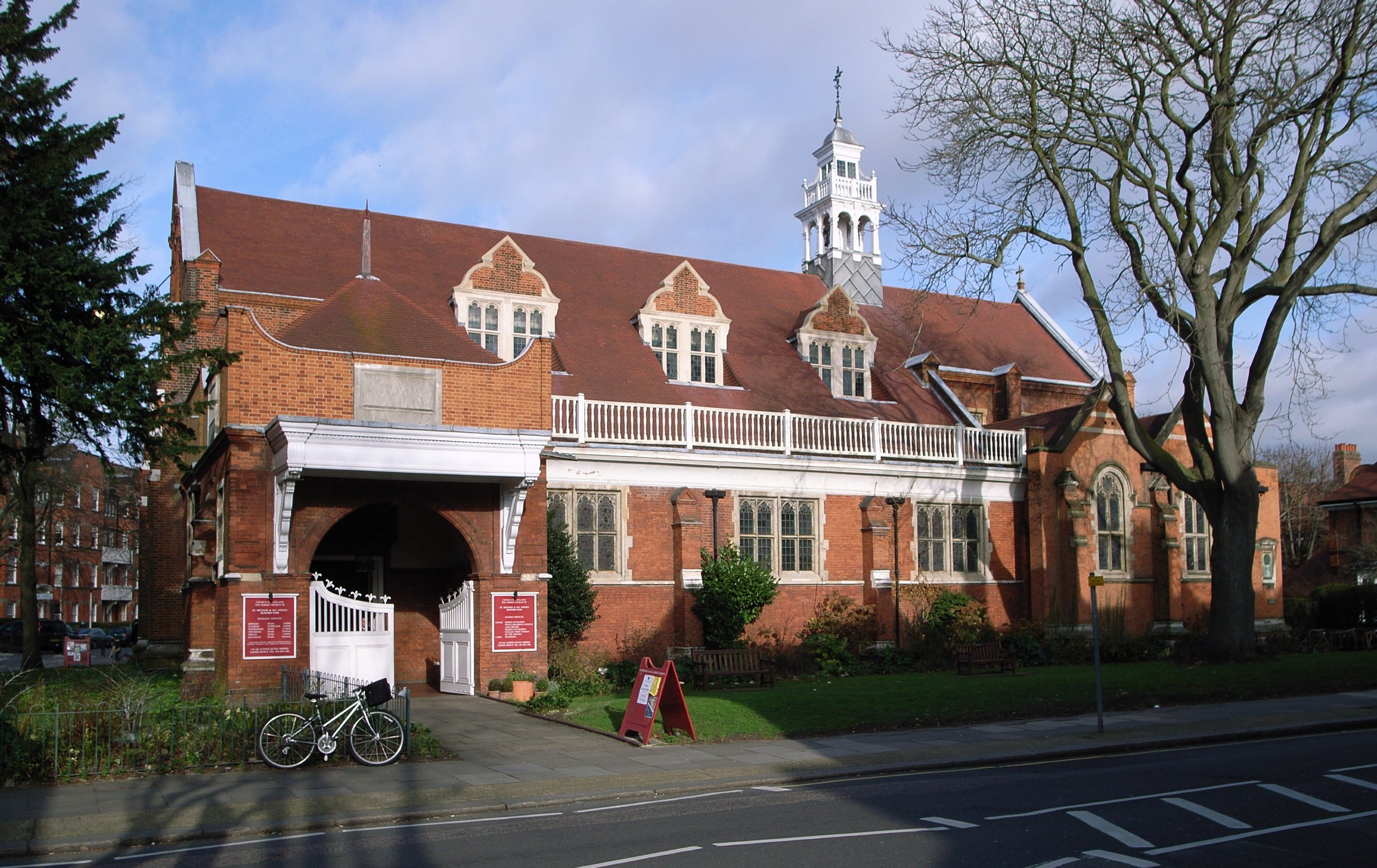
- South front, facing Bath Road
- St Michael and All Angels
- 51.4961°N 0.2548°W
- Location: Bath Road; Chiswick, London
- Country: England
- Denomination: Church of England
- Churchmanship: Anglo-Catholic
- Website: www.smaaa.org.uk

History
- Status: Parish church

Architecture
- Functional status: Active
- Architect: Norman Shaw
- Style: Queen Anne revival Perpendicular Gothic

Specifications
- Materials: Red brick, stone facings

Administration
- Diocese: London
- Archdeaconry: Middlesex
- Deanery: Hounslow
- Parish: St Michael and All Angels Bedford Park

Clergy
- Vicar: Fr Kevin Morris

Listed Building – Grade II*
- Designated: 11 July 1951
- Reference no.: 1079622

St Michael and All Angels is a Grade II* listed Church of England parish church in Bedford Park, Chiswick. It was designed by the architect Norman Shaw, who built some of the houses in that area. The church was consecrated in 1880. It is constructed in what has been described both as British Queen Anne Revival style and as Perpendicular Gothic style modified with English domestic features. Its services are Anglo-Catholic.

== History ==
=== Construction ===
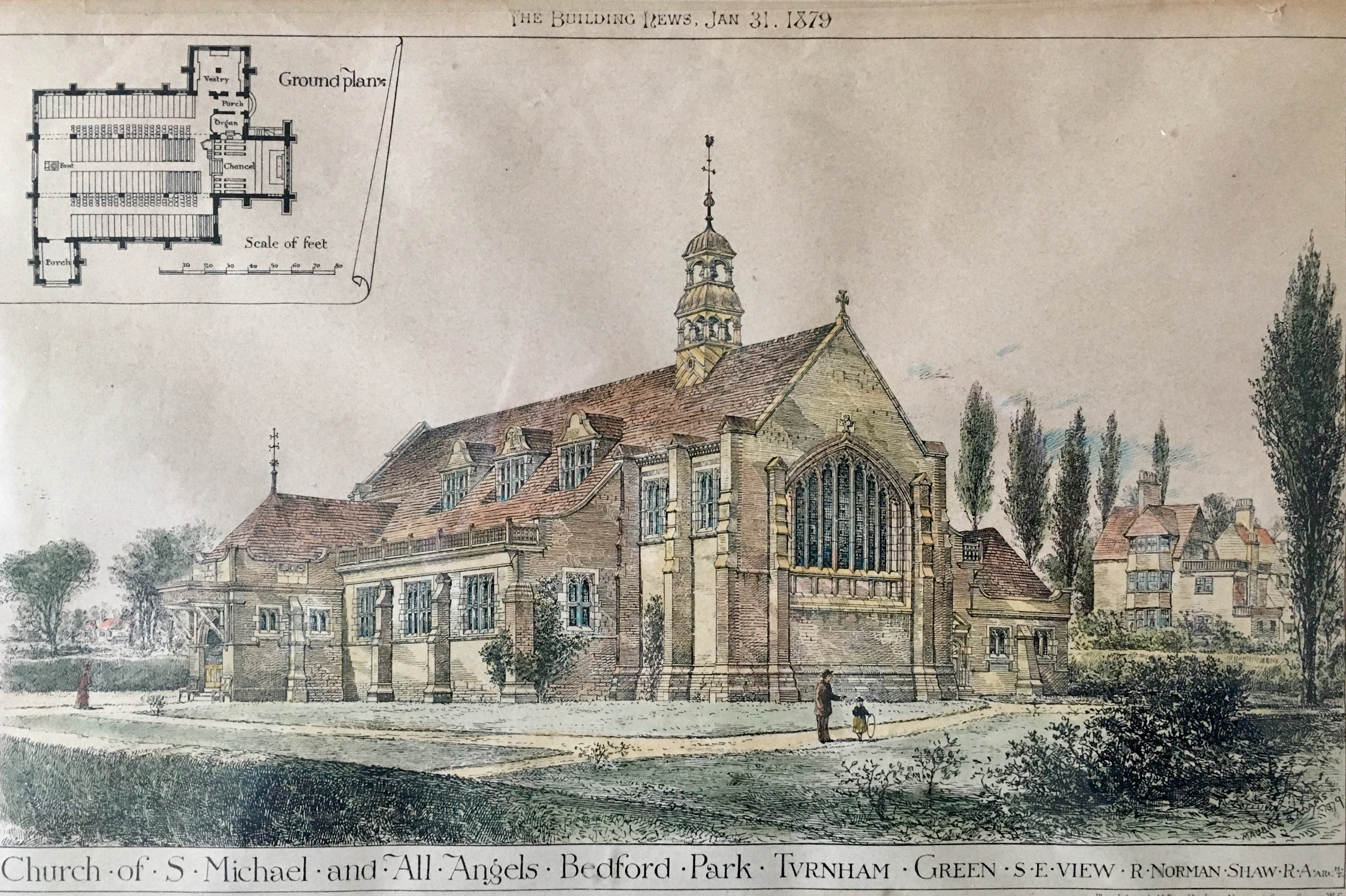
Norman Shaw's design for St Michael and All Angels, drawn by Maurice Bingham Adams for Building News, 1879

St Michael and All Angels began as a temporary building on Chiswick High Road opposite Chiswick Lane, some distance from its present site, in 1876. The present church at the corner of Turnham Green Terrace and Bath Road, near Turnham Green tube station, was designed by the architect Norman Shaw. He was the Estate Architect for Bedford Park, designing some of its earliest houses in red brick and white-painted woodwork, known as British Queen Anne Revival style. Although this style was considered novel and not particularly ecclesiastical by the architect G. E. Street at the time, Shaw decided to use a similar style for the church.

The architectural writer James Stevens Curl describes the style as "Perpendicular Gothic with seventeenth- and eighteenth-century domestic features". He also notes that the wooden features of the church were originally painted pale green. The foundation stone was laid on 31 May 1879. The church was consecrated on 17 April 1880. A churchwarden of St Nicholas Church, Chiswick, the brewer Henry Smith of Chiswick's Fuller Smith & Turner objected in writing to the Bishop of London, raising controversy about the high Anglo-Catholic form of service used in the church. The poet and writer on English architecture John Betjeman called it "a very lovely church and a fine example of Norman Shaw's work." In 1887 Shaw's vision for an additional North aisle was realised by the church's first churchwarden, the architect Maurice Bingham Adams. At the same time he added the church hall on the north side, its red brick harmonising with the church, the font, and the pulpit. Adams added the Chapel of All Souls in a more Gothic style than the rest of the church in 1909.

=== Promotion ===
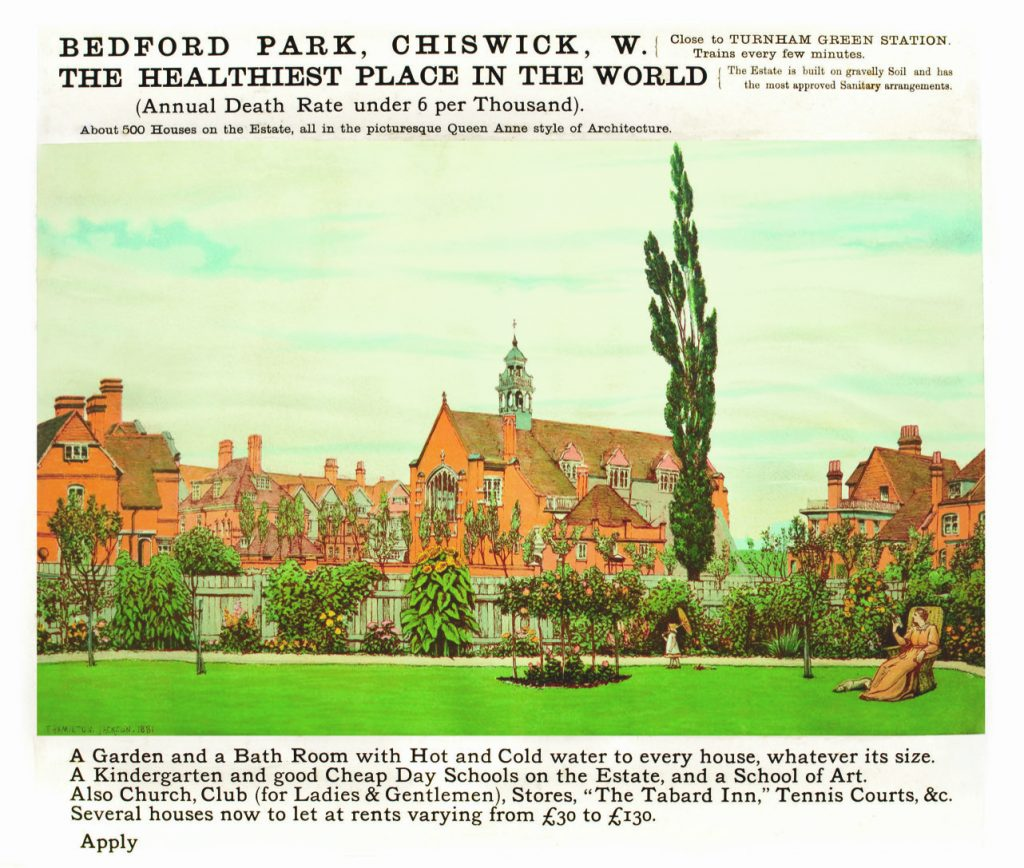
'Bedford Park, Chiswick, W. the Healthiest Place in the World': coloured lithograph by Frederick Hamilton Jackson, c. 1882

The developer of the Bedford Park estate, Jonathan Carr, commissioned the artist F. Hamilton Jackson to create publicity images including an "iconic" one of the church, which had not even been completed at the time. The development was promoted to people who had a moderate income but who had "aesthetic sensibilities". The promotion mentioned gardens, hot and cold water, schools, and "Also Church, Club (for Ladies & Gentlemen), Stores, 'The Tabard Inn', Tennis Courts, &c."

=== War memorials ===
There are two war memorials, both dedicated to parishioners who died in the First World War. One is beside the main rood screen. Its design, by a "Mr. Robinson of Westminster" was announced in the Parish magazine of September 1917 to "take the form of Cavalry in oak over the choir screen", at a planned cost of around £100. The rood screen memorial was unveiled on 28 September 1918, on the eve of the Patronal Feast of St Michael and All Angels. The bronze plaque with the names of the 91 fallen was completed in 1919. The other memorial is just outside the church, by the church hall. It is in the form of a semi-circular stone bench, and is Grade II listed. Dedicated to the local victims of the First World War, it was designed by Inigo Triggs and completed around 1920. In the 1960s, the original nameplates were stolen, and when the memorial was re-sited in its current position, engraved stone replacements were installed. In June 2021, some of the replacement nameplates were again stolen.

=== Restoration ===
The church's roof and stained glass windows were seriously damaged by a Second World War bomb which destroyed the nearby Chiswick Polytechnic. The East Window was filled with new stained glass by Lawrence Lee in 1952. The church's exterior and roof were restored in 1980. In 2013 the bishop of London celebrated the completion of a 5-year project to replace the church organ. The new organ, which has 1667 pipes and 25 stops, was made by the Swiss company La Manufacture d'Orgues St Martin.

== Present day ==
On 11 July 1951, the church was designated a Grade II* listed building.

The church is within the Anglo-Catholic tradition of the Church of England.

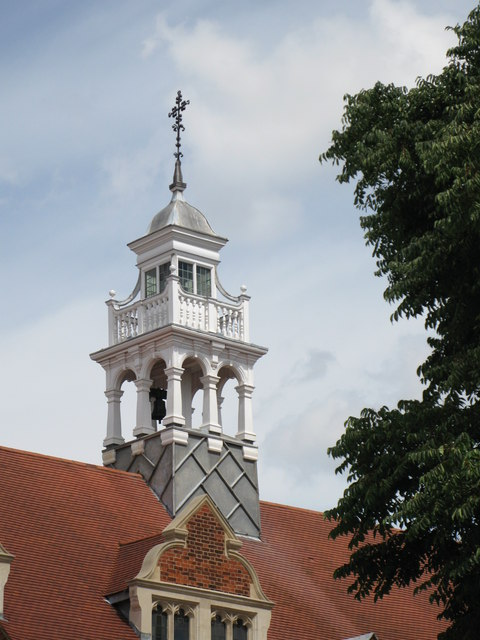
The bell turret

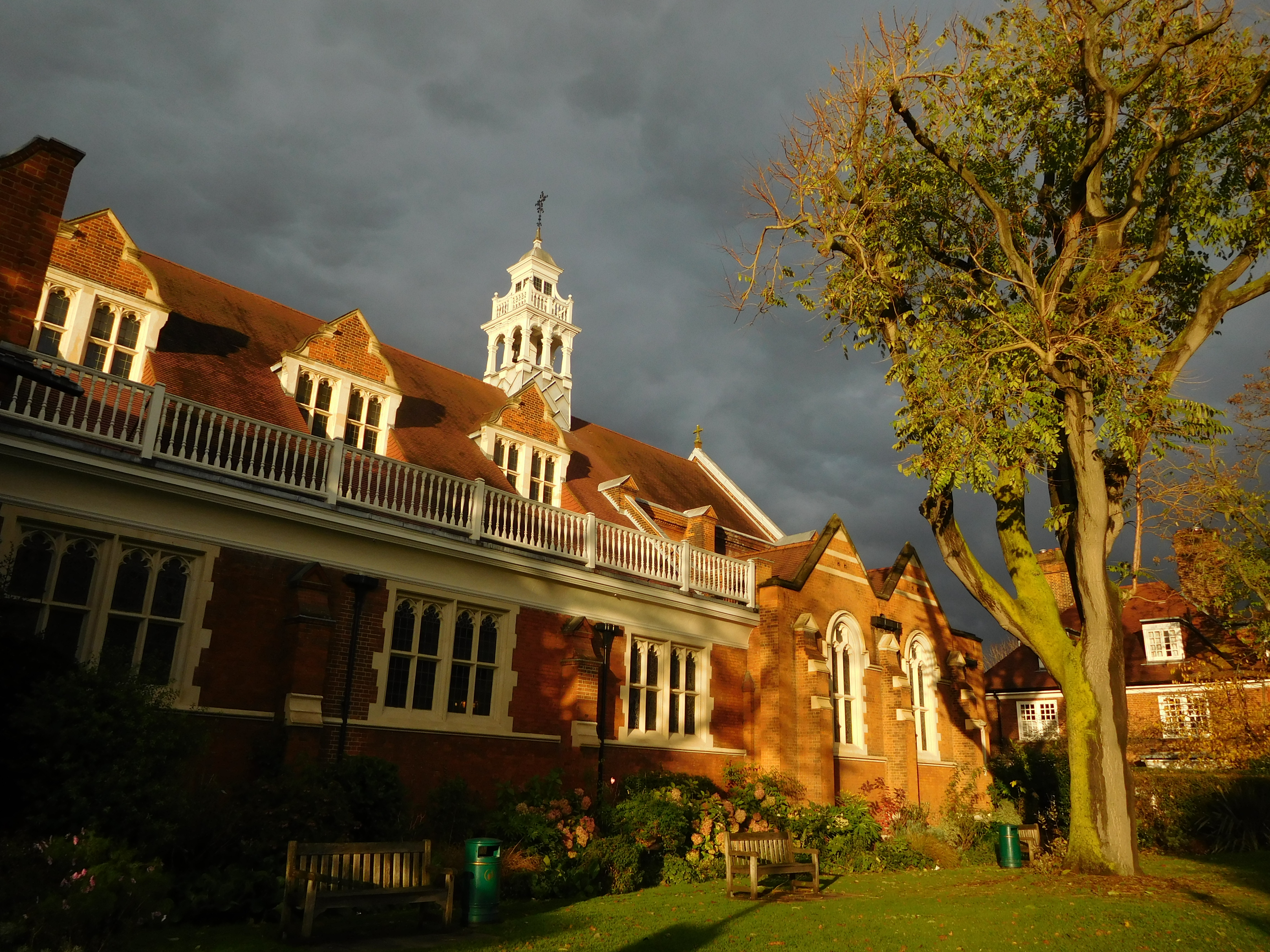
Southeastern corner in autumn light

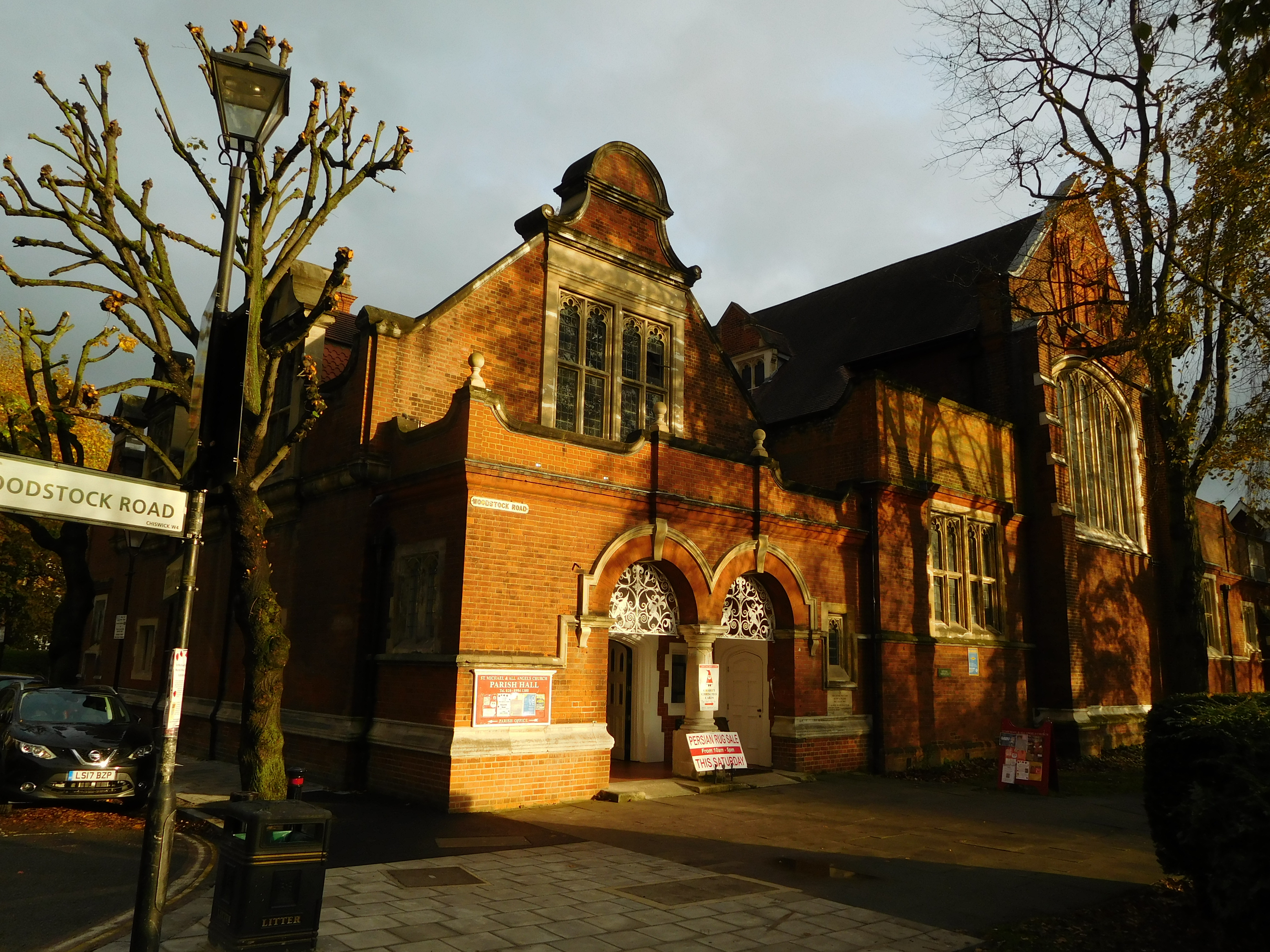
Church hall adjoining the church

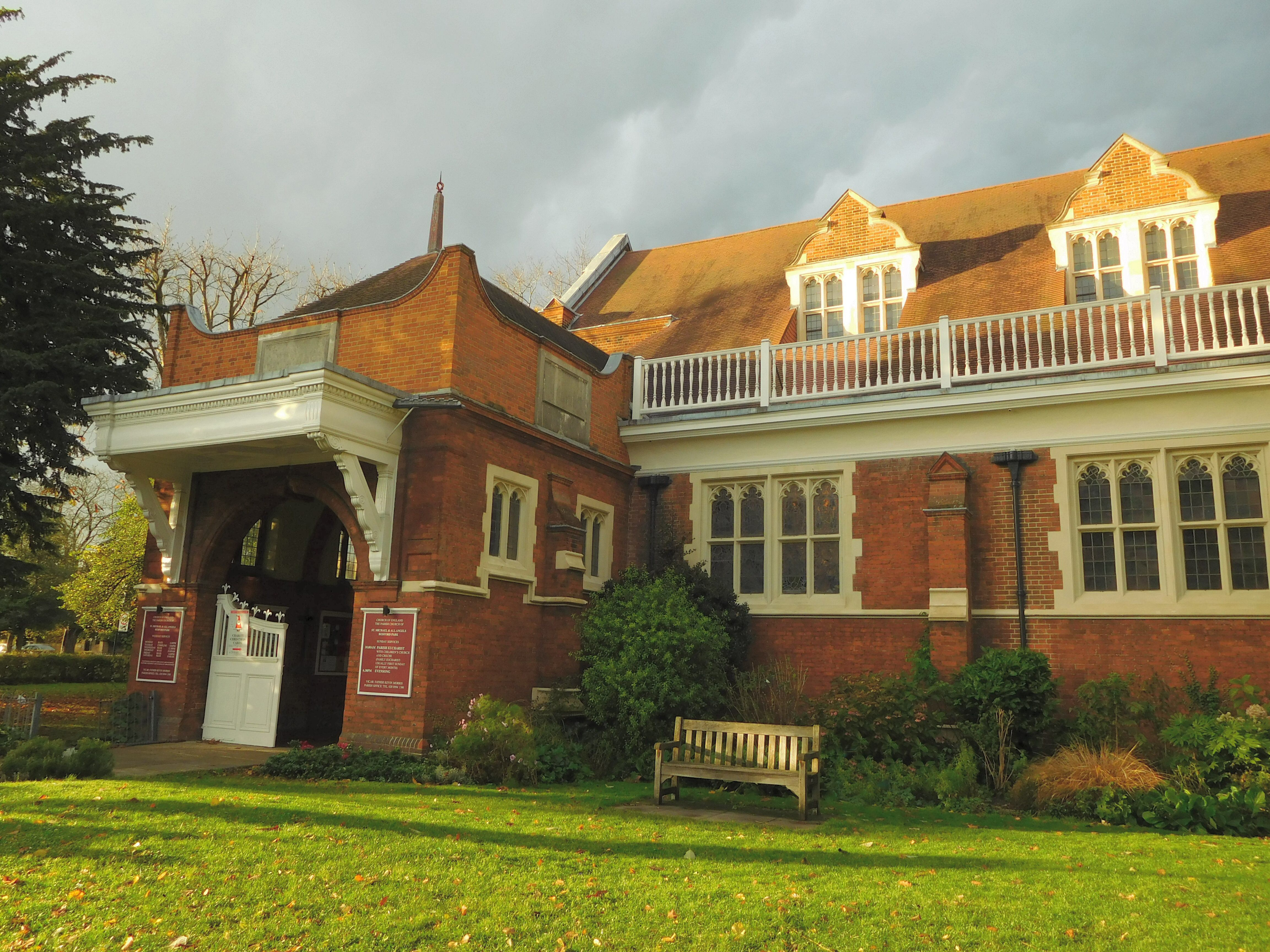
Entrance

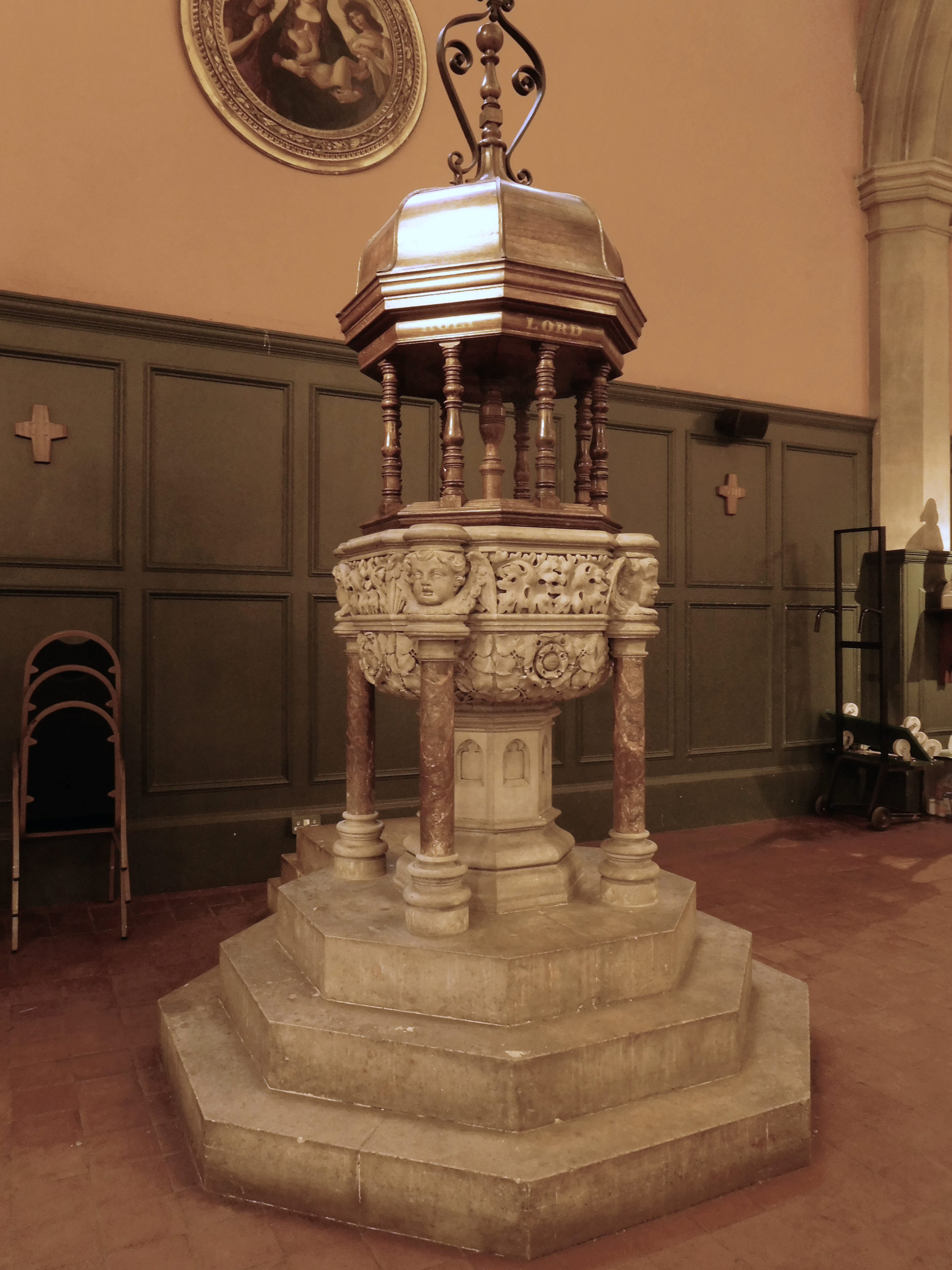
Font

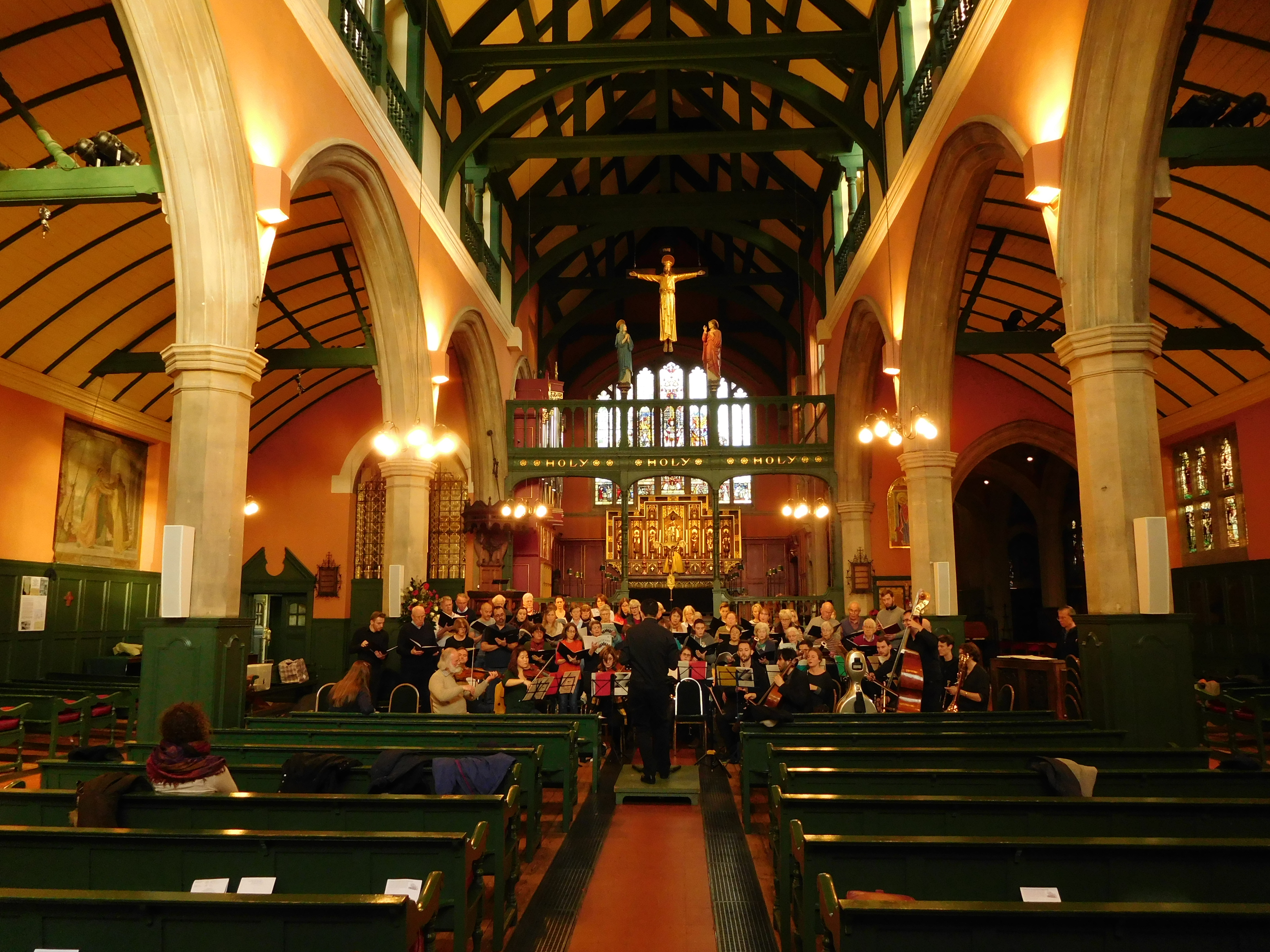
Nave with choir practice

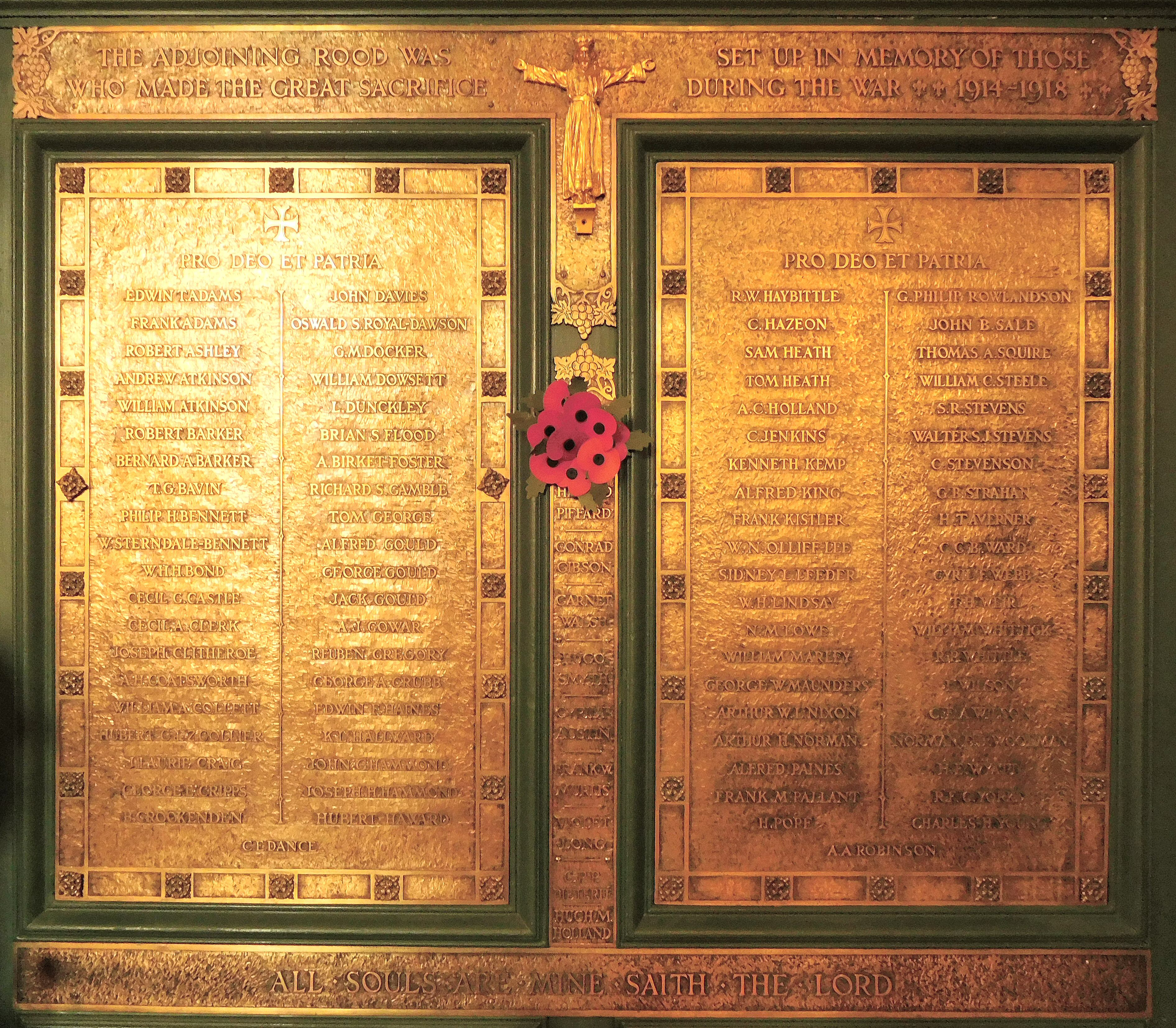
First World War memorial beside the main rood screen

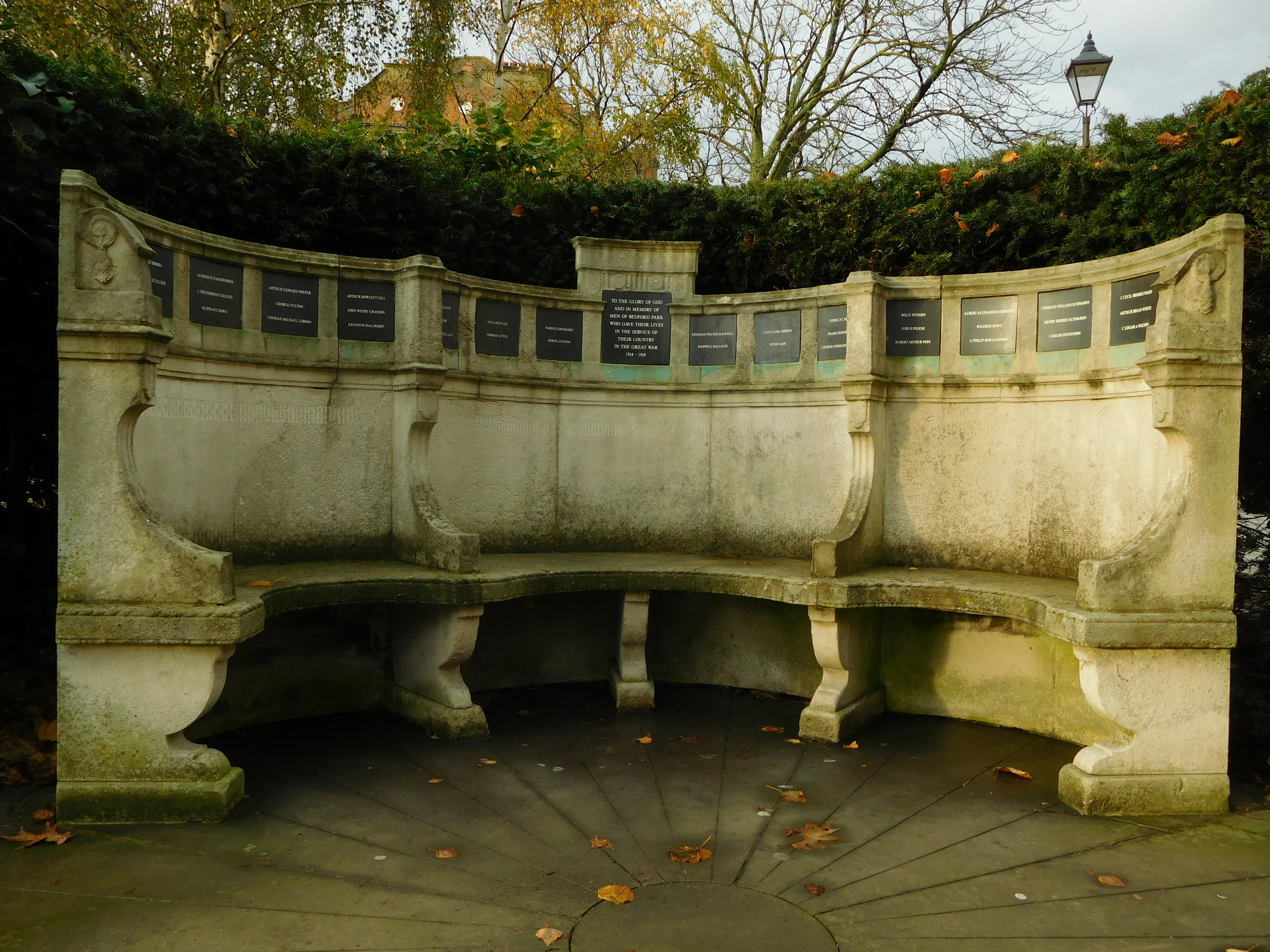
External semicircular stone war memorial by Inigo Triggs, c. 1920
