= Edward John Dodgshun =

English architect (1851-1927)

- Born: 1851; Leeds
- Died: 1927; Wetherby
- Occupation: Architect

Edward John Dodgshun (22 September 1851 - 2 March 1927) was an English architect.

== Life ==
He was born in Leeds, Yorkshire. From 1870 he worked for Thomas Ambler in Leeds. He later moved to London and worked for a year in the office of George Edmund Street, and with William Burges. He returned to Leeds in 1875 where he commenced practice as an architect. He was in partnership with William Frederick Unsworth, under the name Dodgshun & Unsworth from around 1875 to 1879, and then from 1898 with George Dale Oliver as Oliver & Dodgshun in Carlisle.

In 1891, Dodgshun was elected a Fellow of the Royal Institute of British Architects (FRIBA). He was also a member of the Leeds and Yorkshire Architectural Society and served as its President for two years. He died in Wetherby, Yorkshire. His son, Leslie Sydney Dodgshun (1875-1930), followed him into the architectural profession.

== Notable works ==
Notable works by Dodgshun include:

- The Shakespeare Memorial Theatre, Stratford-upon-Avon (1879) with William Frederick Unsworth. This burned down in 1926. It is now the Swan Theatre.
- Abtech House, offices of the West Riding Union Bank at 18 Park Row, Leeds.
- The rebuilding of the fire-damaged Silcoates School in Wakefield, Yorkshire.
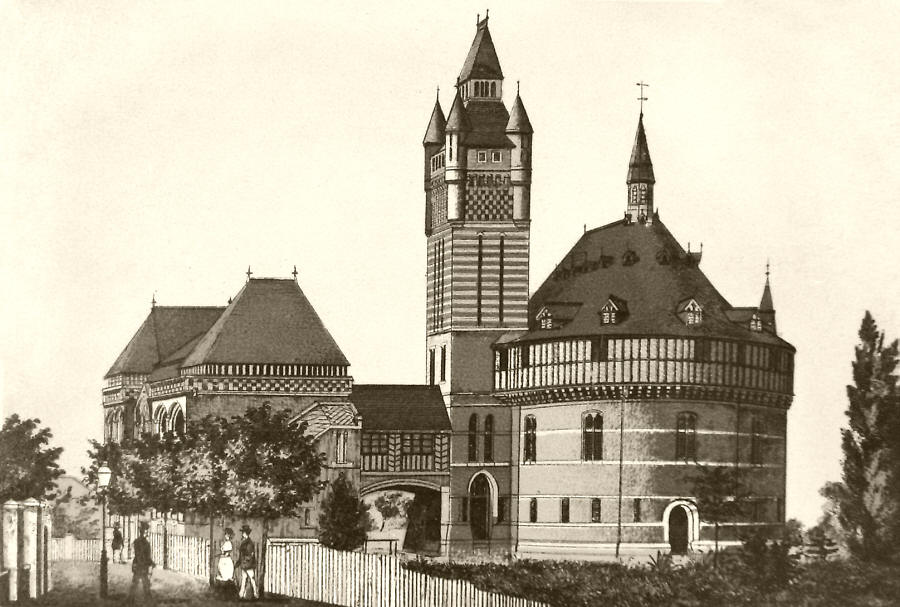
Shakespeare Memorial Theatre

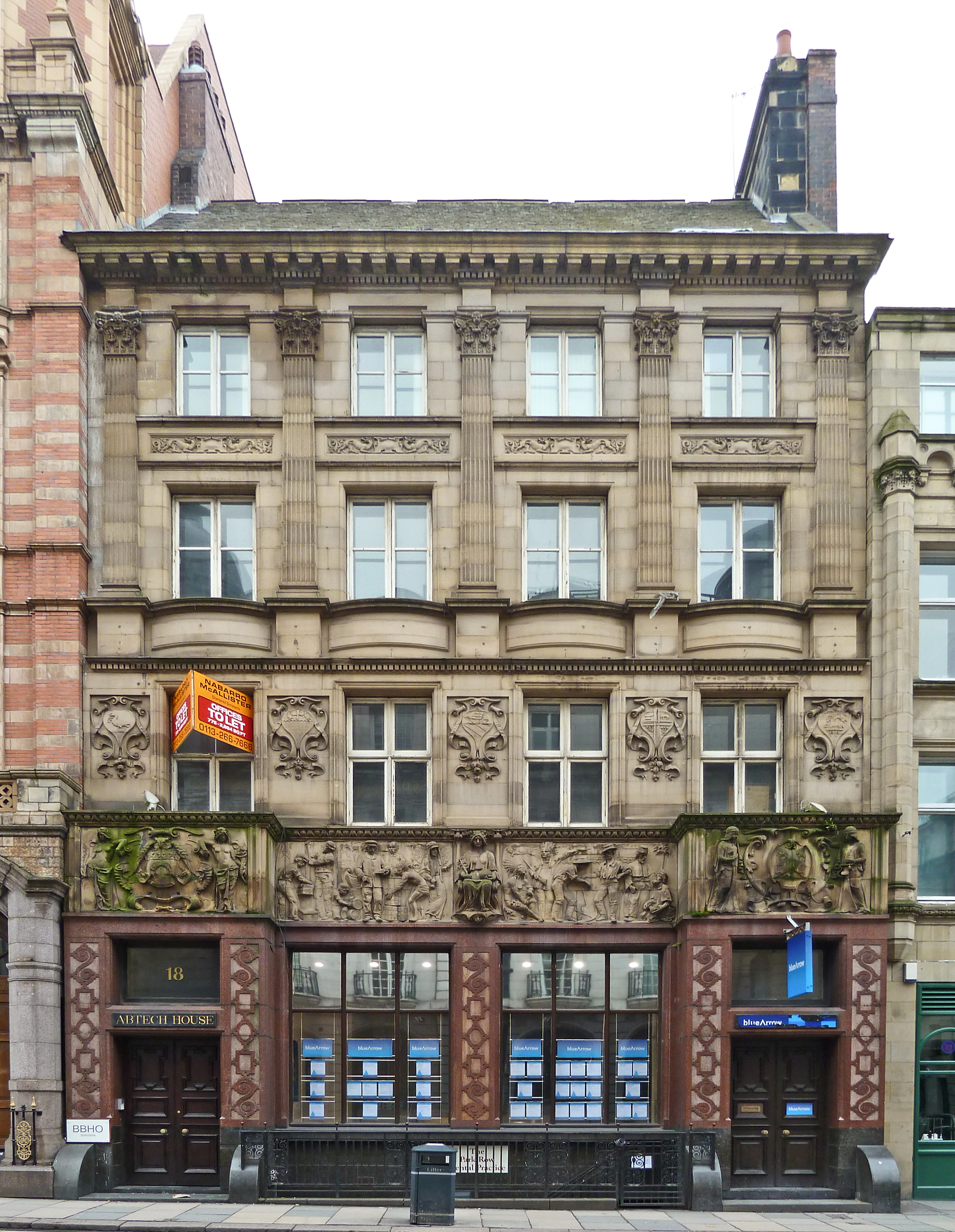
Abtech House
