= Royal Shakespeare Theatre =

Theatre in Stratford-upon-Avon, England

Coordinates: 52.1905°N 1.7039°W

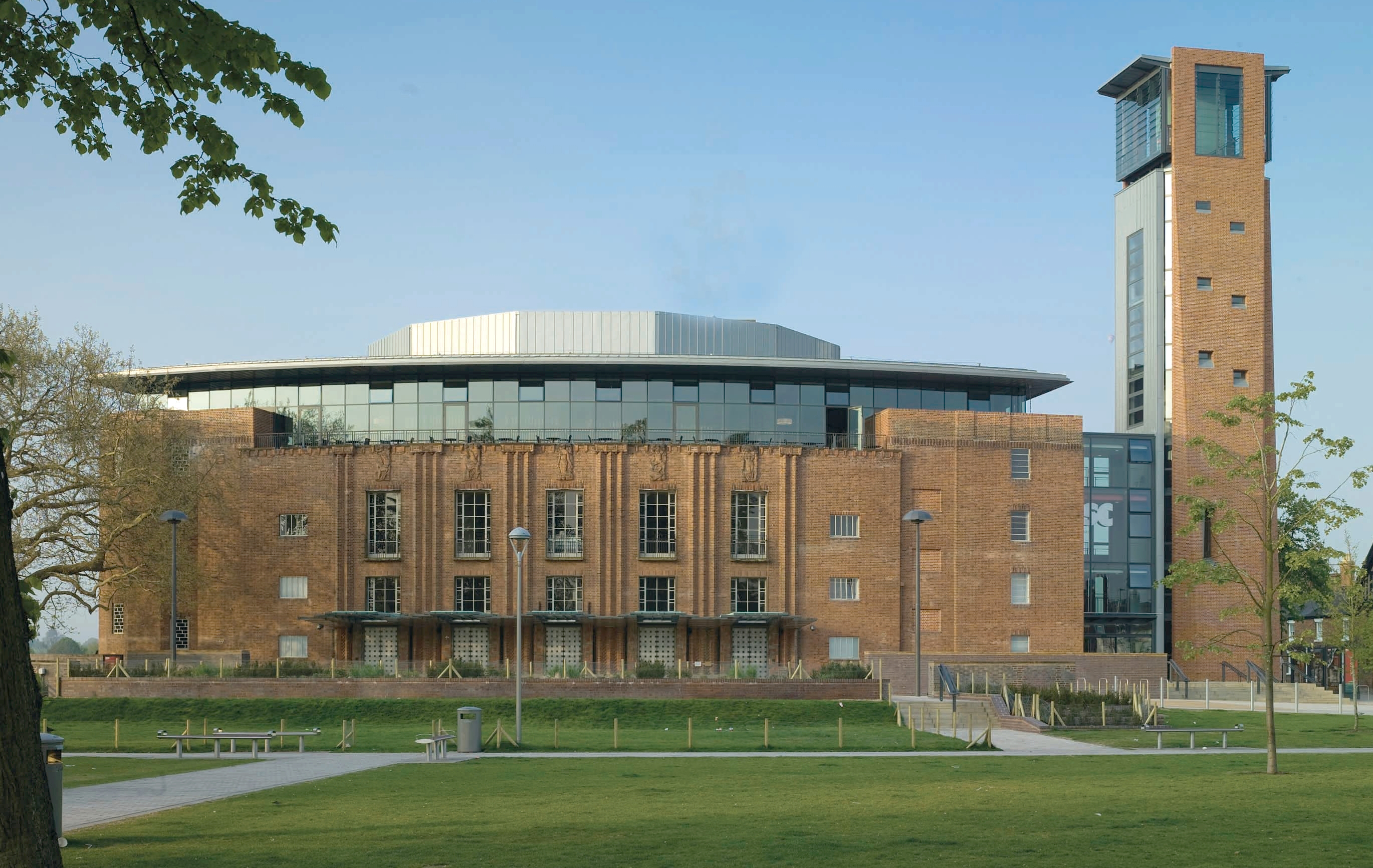
- The Royal Shakespeare Theatre in 2011, north frontage and tower
- Interactive map of the Royal Shakespeare Theatre area
- Former names: Shakespeare Memorial Theatre

General information
- Status: Grade II* listed
- Opened: 1879
- Relocated: 1932
- Renovated: 2007-10
- Owner: Royal Shakespeare Company

Design and construction
- Architects: William Unsworth (1879); Edward Dodgshun (1879); Elisabeth Scott (1932); Bennetts Associates (2005-2010)

Other information
- Public transit: Stratford-upon-Avon railway station

Listed Building – Grade II*
- Official name: Royal Shakespeare Theatre
- Designated: 13 May 1971
- Reference no.: 1207396

The Royal Shakespeare Theatre (RST) (originally called the Shakespeare Memorial Theatre) is a Grade II* listed 1,040+ seat thrust stage theatre owned by the Royal Shakespeare Company dedicated to the English playwright and poet William Shakespeare. It is located beside the River Avon in the town of Stratford-upon-Avon – Shakespeare's birthplace – in the English Midlands. The building incorporates the smaller Swan Theatre. The Royal Shakespeare and Swan Theatres re-opened in November 2010 after undergoing a major renovation known as the Transformation Project.

== History ==
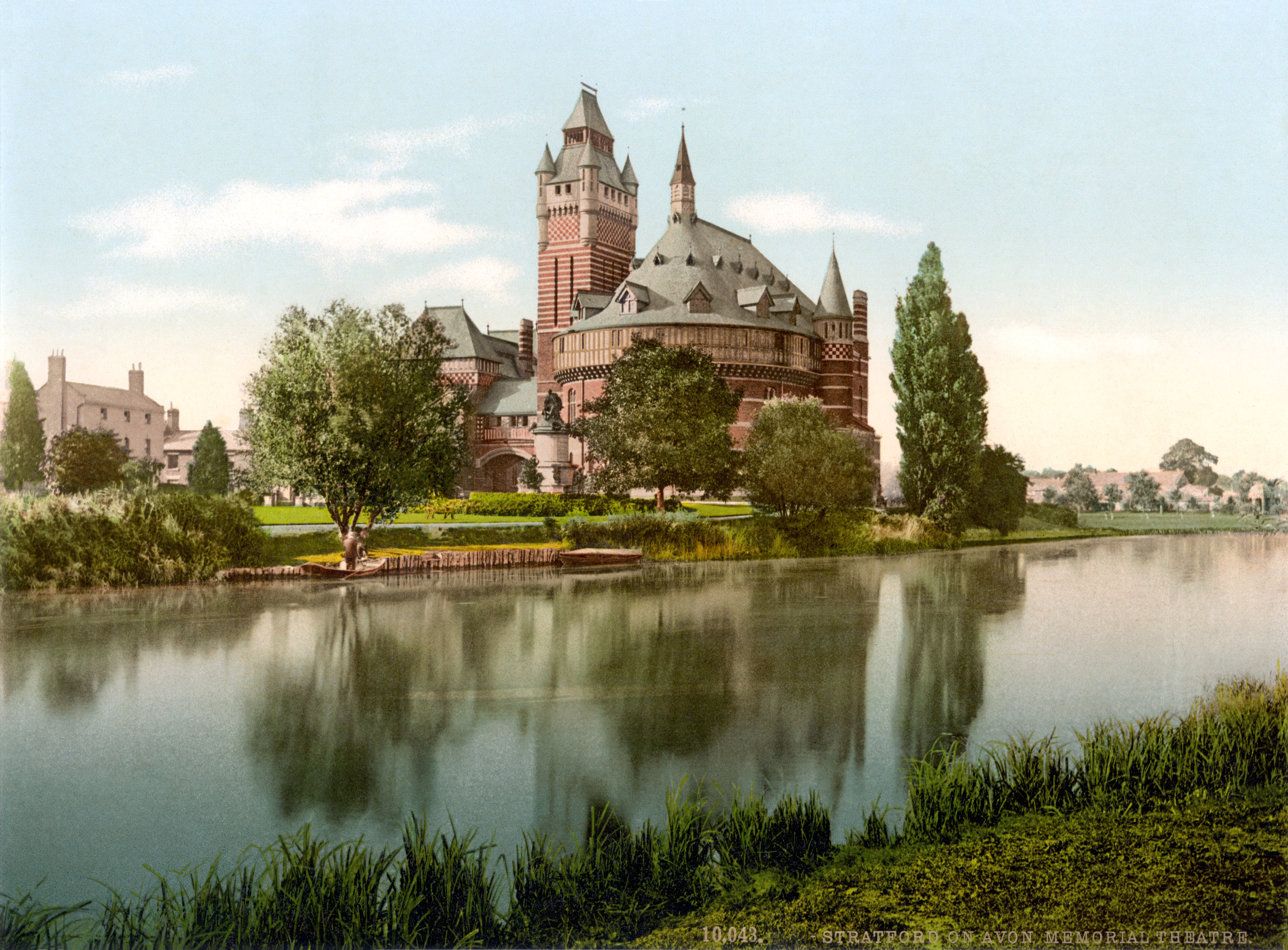
The first Shakespeare Memorial Theatre of 1879, from an 1890s photochrom. This was gutted by a fire in 1926, and rebuilt and incorporated into the new theatre in 1932. The building has been used by the Swan Theatre since 1986.

The theatre as it appeared in 1991, prior to redevelopment

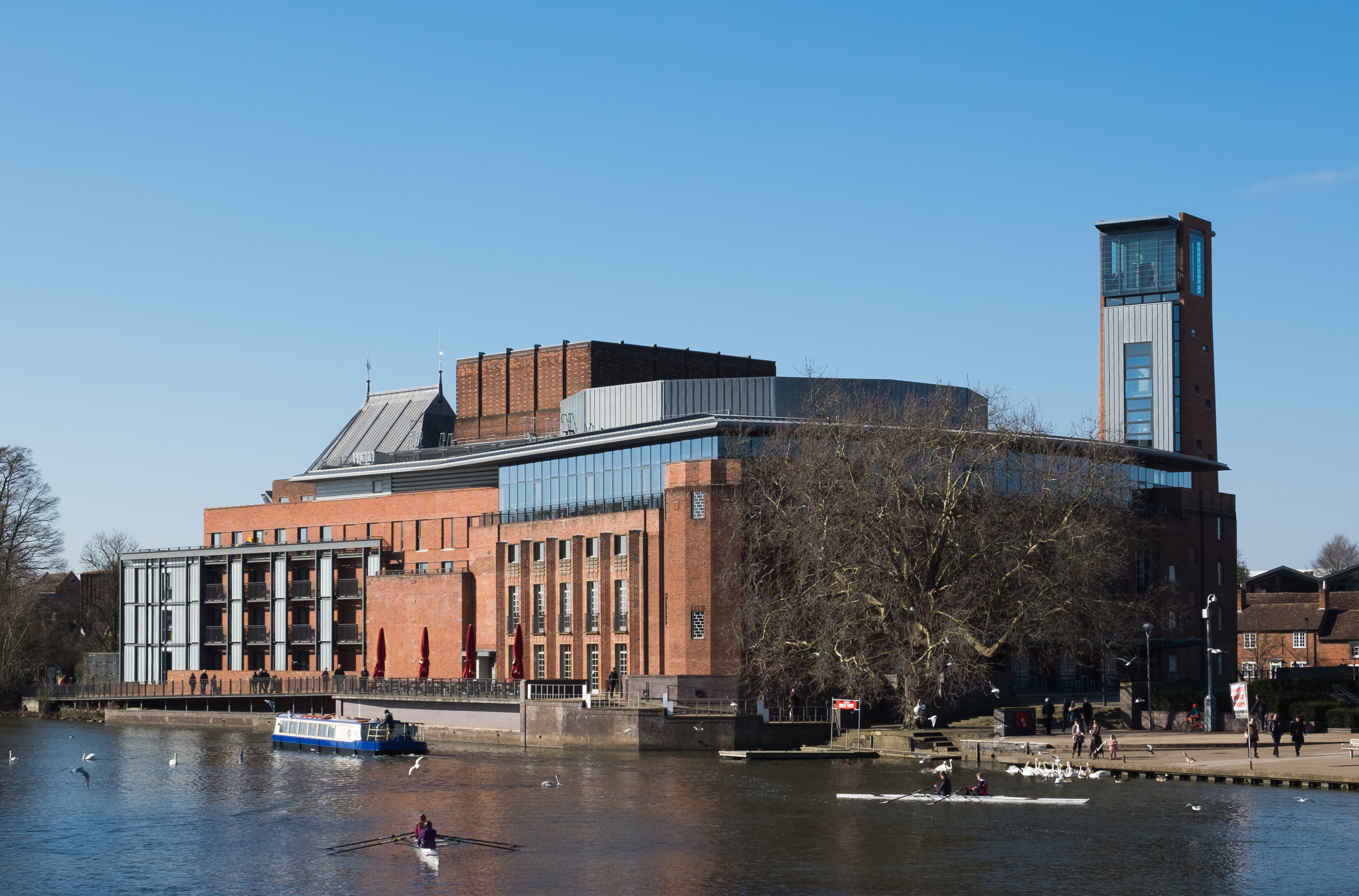
The theatre in 2018 post-redevelopment, viewed from the old tramway bridge across the River Avon

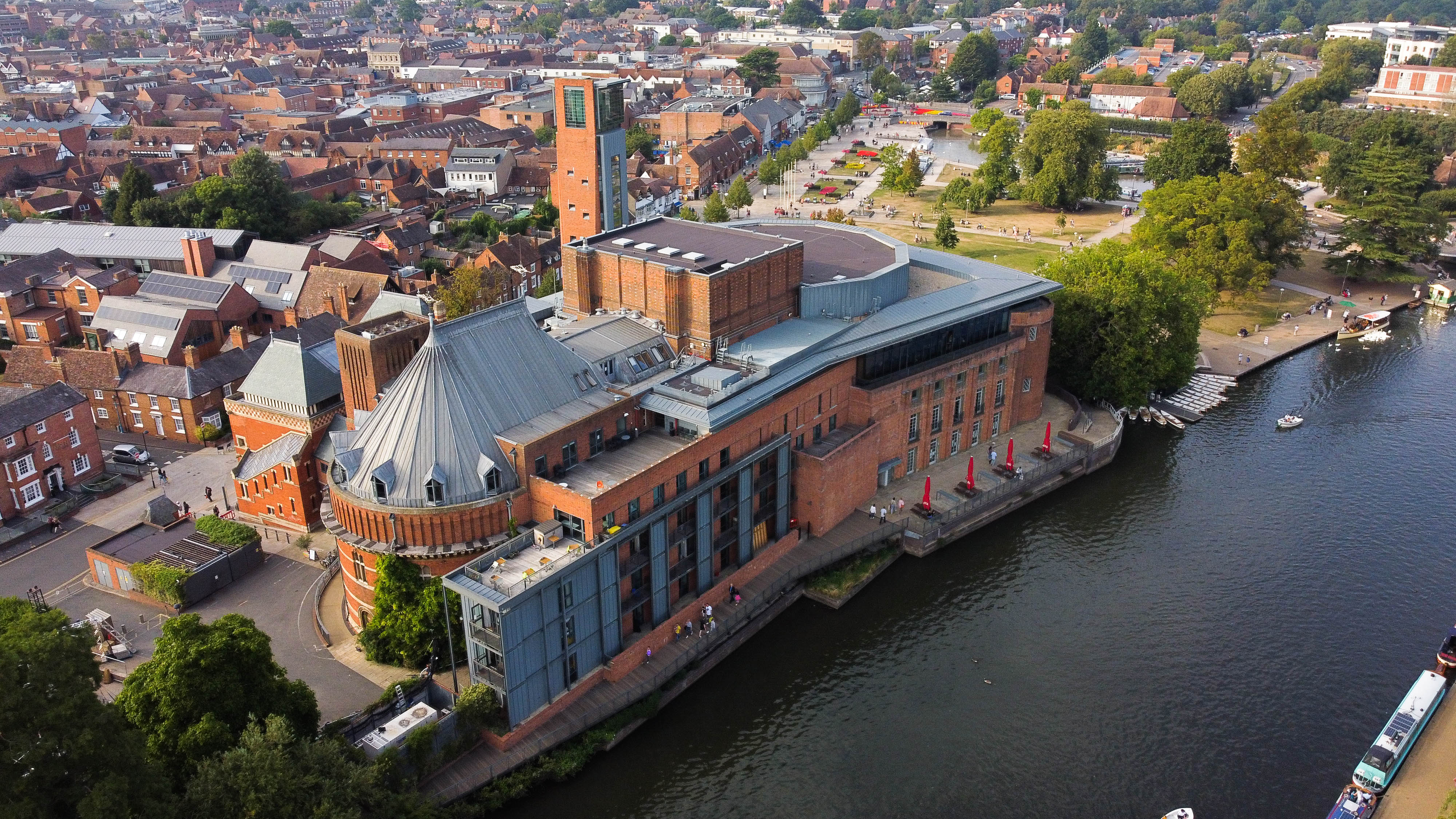
The theatre in 2021 viewed from the south from the air

The tricentenary of Shakespeare's birth in 1864 gave impetus for a permanent memorial to him in his hometown. The original Shakespeare Memorial Theatre came about through the campaigning efforts and donations of Edward Fordham Flower and his son Charles Edward Flower, owners of a local brewery business in Stratford, and important figures in local political affairs, due to their efforts, the first theatre was opened on the banks of the Avon on 19 April 1879. It was a Victorian Gothic structure, designed by William Unsworth and Edward Dodgshun.

The original theatre was gutted by fire on 6 March 1926. The new Shakespeare Memorial Theatre opened in 1932 on a site adjacent to the original. The architect was Elisabeth Scott, so the theatre became the first important building erected in Britain from the designs of a woman architect. It was renamed the Royal Shakespeare Theatre in 1961, following the establishment of the Royal Shakespeare Company the previous year.

In the building designed by Scott, the theatre had a proscenium-arch stage, and a seating capacity of about 1,400 people, on three tiers (stalls, circle and balcony). Two tiers of seating were later added to the side walls of the theatre and the stage extended beyond the proscenium, by means of an 'apron'. Balcony seats could only be accessed by means of a staircase to the side of the building, separate from the main foyer and bar. The theatre has several notable Art Deco features, including the staircase and corridors at either side of the auditorium. It is a Grade II* listed building.

The current theatre complex includes the remains of the original 1879 theatre, which was rebuilt and incorporated into Scott's building to serve as a conference centre and rehearsal room. Since 1986 it has been used by the Swan Theatre.

The Royal Shakespeare and Swan Theatres are on the western bank of the River Avon, with the adjacent Bancroft Gardens providing a scenic riverside setting. The Rooftop Restaurant and Bar overlooks both the river and the Bancroft Gardens.

=== Redevelopment ===
The Royal Shakespeare Company had renovated the Royal Shakespeare Theatre as part of a £112.8m Transformation project which included the creation of a new 1040+ seat, thrust stage auditorium which brought actors and audiences closer together, with the distance of the furthest seat from the stage being reduced from 27 metres (89 ft) to 15 metres (49 ft). The Transformation project also included improvements to the Swan Theatre, the creation of an array of new public spaces, including a new Riverside Cafe and Rooftop Restaurant, a 36-metre (118 ft) observation tower, and improved backstage conditions for the actors and crew. The new theatre is also more accessible to people with disabilities and offers a more comfortable theatre experience.

The theatre is a "one-room" theatre, which allows the actors and the audience to share the same space, as they did when Shakespeare's plays were first produced. The stage reaches out into the audience, who are seated on three sides of it. This one-room theatre creates a more traditional Shakespearean performance area, allowing the audience to draw closer to the actors and creating a more personal theatre experience.

The funding for the project came from many different sources including; private pledges, Arts Council England, and the regional development agency Advantage West Midlands, as well as a successful public fundraising campaign. The Transformation project also incorporated the creation of the temporary Courtyard Theatre to house performances in Stratford-upon-Avon during the time the Royal Shakespeare and Swan Theatres were closed, new offices at Chapel Lane, a nursery and refurbished rehearsal rooms at Arden Street. The project reached over a total of £100 million in cost and also drew in financial support from RSC America and its own board members.

Plans to redevelop the theatre were finalised and work commenced in 2007, with a scheduled completion date of 2010. The RSC had its own project team, led by Project Director, Peter Wilson OBE. Other members of the project team included: Bennetts Associates (architects), Buro Happold (engineers and transport consultants), Charcoalblue (theatre consultants), Mace (construction managers), Acoustic Dimensions (acoustic consultants), Drivers Jonas Deloitte (project management and strategic planning advisors) and Gardiner and Theobald (quantity surveyors and planning supervisors).

An urn containing the ashes of Actor Ian Richardson who had died on 9 February 2007 was placed into the foundations of the auditorium of the building during its renovation in 2008 by his widow Maroussia Frank and his son Miles Richardson.

Meanwhile, performances were transferred to the temporary Courtyard Theatre, which was a full-sized working prototype for the Royal Shakespeare Theatre, built on the site of the RSC's studio theatre, The Other Place.

The new theatre opened in November 2010, with preview events and activities, in advance of the first full Shakespeare performances from the RSC's existing repertoire from February 2011. The first new productions designed specifically for the Royal Shakespeare Theatre's stage began from April 2011, with Michael Boyd's Macbeth, part of the RSC's 50th Birthday Season celebrations, which ran from April to December 2011.

Queen Elizabeth II and Prince Philip officially opened the Royal Shakespeare Theatre on 4 March 2011. Ceremonies included a performance of the balcony scene from Romeo and Juliet.

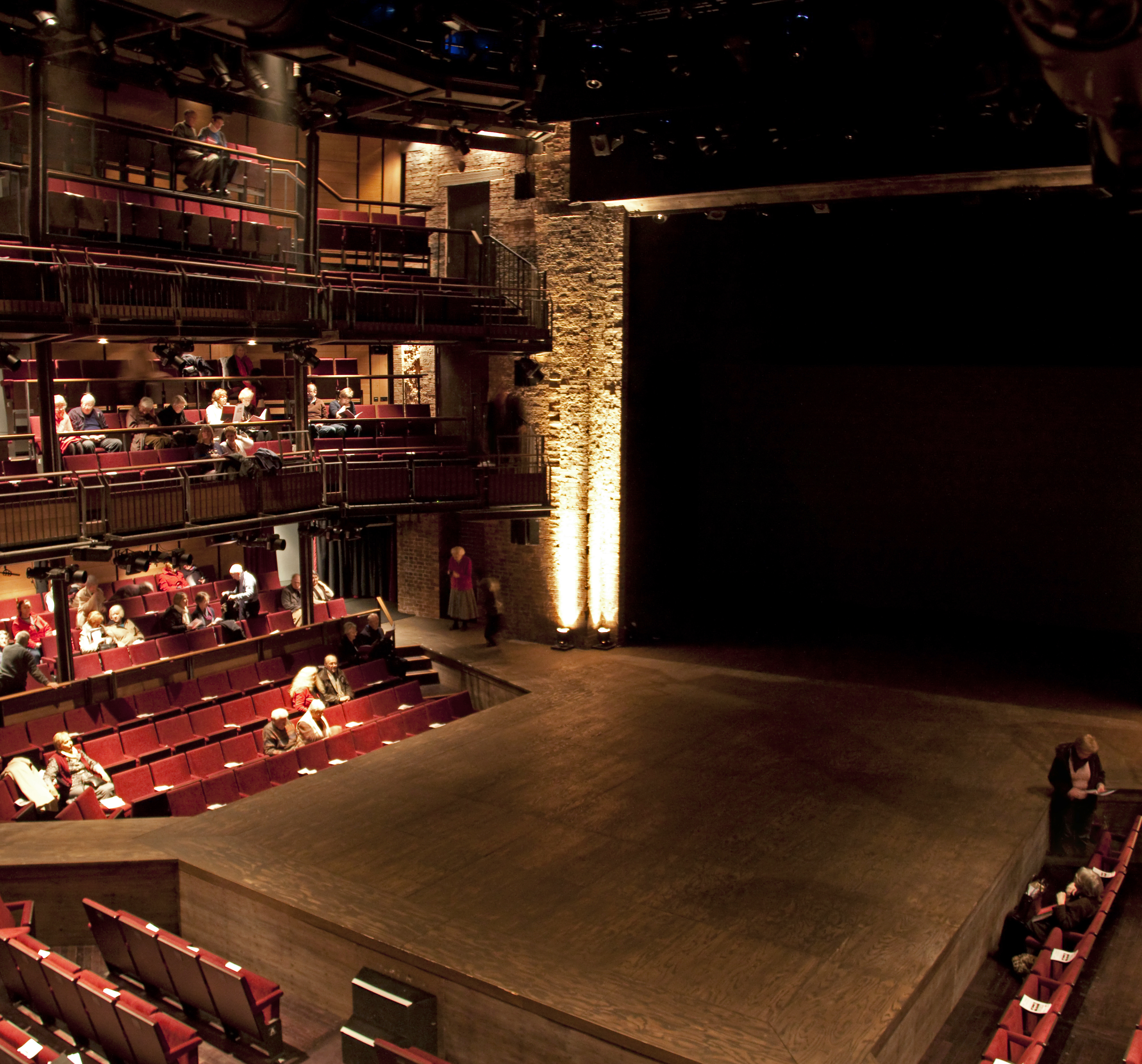
Stage and interior

== Facilities ==
The theatre has a new Rooftop Restaurant and Bar with views over the River Avon, a Riverside Cafe and Terrace, a Colonnade linking the Royal Shakespeare and Swan Theatres together for the first time, the PACCAR Room exhibition space, and a 36-metre-high (118 ft) tower which provides circulation and views across Stratford-upon-Avon and the surrounding area from its 32-metre-high (105 ft) viewing platform. There is also a riverside walk which stretches from the Bancroft Gardens, past the theatre, towards Holy Trinity Church.

The whole building is now accessible for the first time for visitors, performers and staff with disabilities. The renovations tripled the number of dedicated wheelchair spaces in the new auditorium from those in the previous auditorium, added lifts (there were no public lifts in the previous building), accessible toilets on all levels and removed steps on the riverside walk, which previously had many stepped levels.
