= William Frederick Unsworth =

English architect

- Born: 1851
- Died: 1912; Petersfield
- Occupation: Architect

William Frederick Unsworth (1851–1912) was an English architect.

== Biography ==
William Frederick Unsworth began working in 1869 in the Wilson & Wilcox agency in Bath, then after a one-year trip to France, he spent two years in the architectural firm of George Edmund Street, then a year with William Burges.

He opened his own architectural firm in 1875 where he first worked in partnership with architect Edward John Dodgshun (1851–1927).

Around 1908 he moved to Steep, near Petersfield, where he worked in partnership with his son, Gerald Unsworth (1883–1946) and Inigo Triggs (1876–1923). He then built several houses in the Arts and Crafts style.

He died suddenly of a heart attack at his home in Steep, near Petersfield, in 1912.

== Achievements ==
- The "Shakespeare Memorial Theatre" and Stratford-upon-Avon Library, in 1879, with Edward John Dodgshun. This theatre was destroyed by fire in 1926. It is now the Swan Theatre.
- Village of Sion Mills, south of Strabane, County Tyrone, Ulster, in the 1880s and 1890s, for the Herdman brothers who had a flax factory there. William Frederick Unsworth was the son-in-law of James Herdman.
- Christ Church, Woking, in 1889.
- Woodhambury, Woodham Lane, Woking, in 1889.
- Weston Hotel, Newbridge, Bath, in 1890 in an Arts and Crafts style.
- All Saints Church, Woodham Lane, Woking, in 1893.
- Good Sheperd Church, in the village of Sion Mills, Northern Ireland, in 1909.
- Broad Dene, Hill Road built for Walter Tyndale by the architectural firm comprising WF Unsworth, his son and Inigo Triggs
- Ashford Chace, Petersfield, in 1912.
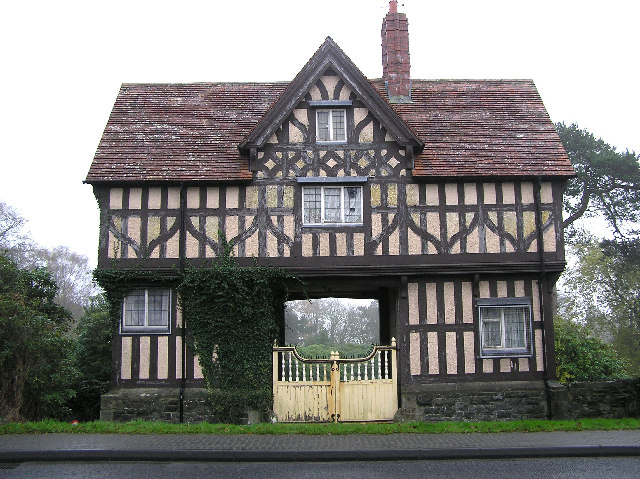
Gate House at Sion Mills

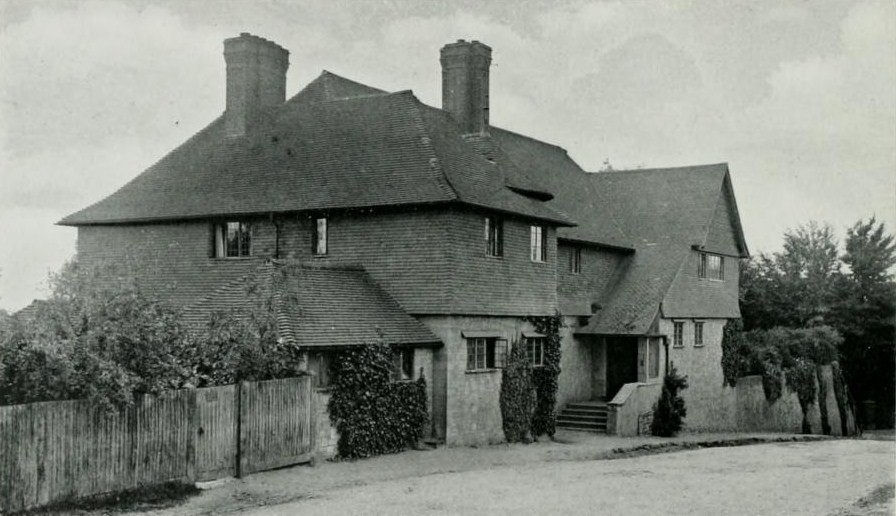
Broad Dene

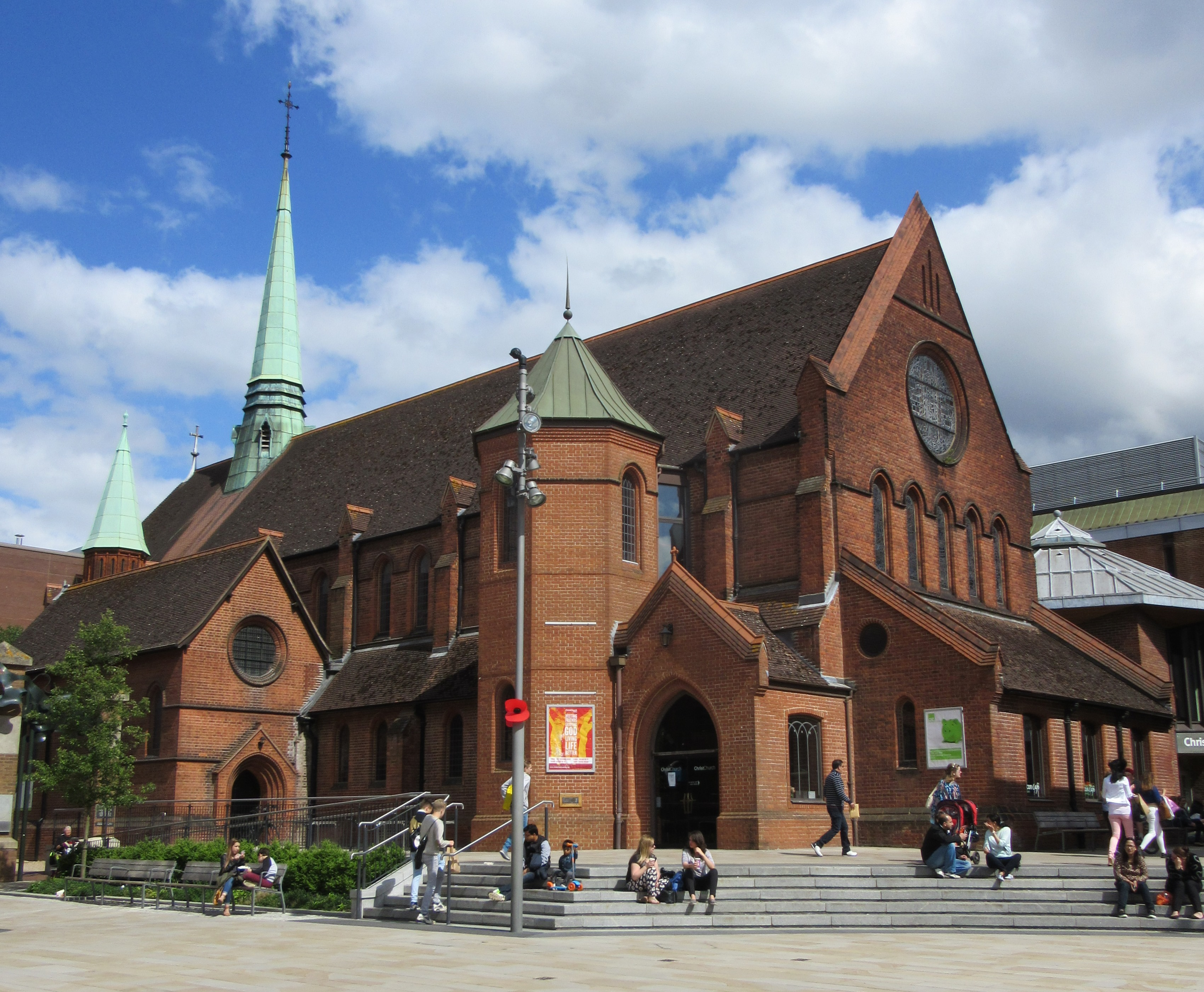
Christ Church, Woking

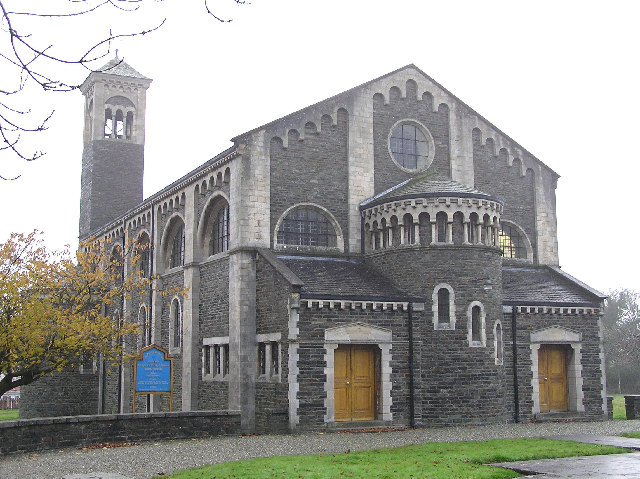
Good Sheperd Church, in the village of Sion Mills
