= Rake, West Sussex =

Village in Hampshire and West Sussex, England

Coordinates: 51.03°N 0.86°W

Rake
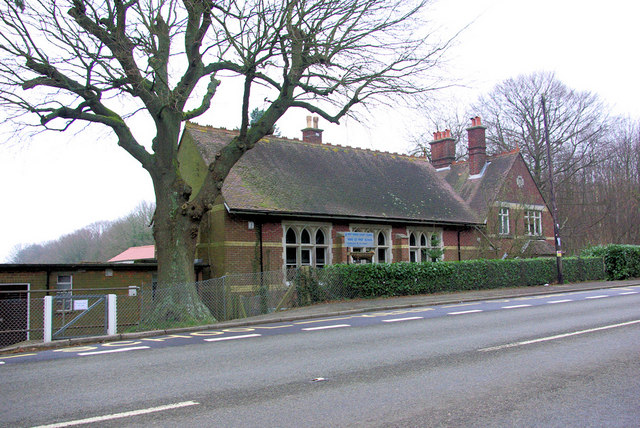
- Rake CE First School

- Location within West Sussex
- OS grid reference: SU8027
  - London: 60 miles (97 km) NE
- Civil parish: Rogate
- District: Chichester
- Shire county: West Sussex
- Region: South East
- Country: England
- Sovereign state: United Kingdom
- Post town: PETERSFIELD
- Postcode district: GU33
- Police: Sussex
- Fire: West Sussex
- Ambulance: South East Coast
- UK Parliament: Chichester

Rake is a small rural village lying astride the B2070 road and the border between West Sussex and Hampshire in southeast England. The B2070 was formerly the A3 London to Portsmouth trunk road, but Rake, several other villages, and the town of Petersfield, are now by-passed. Rake lies between the villages of Liphook and Hill Brow. Part of the village is in East Hampshire District and part in Chichester District; similarly the village is served by two civil parish councils, Liss and Rogate, and by two ecclesiastical parishes. There is light industry, retail and servicing outlets, a primary school, public and private houses and care homes.

The village has not had a long recorded history, but has been a significant stopping place on what was the original mail road and turnpike between London and the naval base at Portsmouth. Evidence of lawlessness is recorded from the 18th century.

== History ==
=== 18th century ===
Mail coaches travelled the road through Rake from 1784, and Charles Harper opined that there was "no road so wild and lonely as the Portsmouth Road". Most of the journey would have been through commons, wasteland and woods, and Rake was no exception.

There were several pubs in Rake owing to the importance of the route between London and Portsmouth. The Flying Bull pub, which straddles the border between West Sussex and Hampshire, had been in operation for some years (occupier Mr Eames, who was retiring) when the Hampshire Chronicle advertised its sale in 1775,

on the great Post and Turnpike Road from London to Portsmouth, with 2 Stables and other convenient Buildings, all in exceeding good repair, a large pleasant Garden, and two Acres of Land adjoining. Also a Blacksmith’s Shop on the Premises, which is all Freehold. The Stock of Liquors and Brewing Utensils to be taken at a fair Appraisement.

Across the road was the Red Lion, which was the scene of a murder in 1748 committed by members of the Hawkhurst Gang. The innkeeper, named Scardefield, was sympathetic to the gang. The gang buried one of their victims in the sand, possibly still alive, near the inn, which is now a private residence. The Sun Inn had existed at least as early as 1786, when the murderers of the Unknown Sailor were apprehended there the following day, trying to sell his bloodstained jacket.

In the 18th century, highway robbery was rife, whether petty thieving, robbery or even murder. A coach carrying cash for sailors' wages worth several thousand pounds overturned on Rake Hill, and would have been robbed had the boxes not been so heavy. A party of marines intervened, eventually.

=== 19th century ===
Large private properties were built in Rake, particularly on the hill towards Hill Brow, by and for people of means ("pretentious country residences", according to Charles Harper). Some of these subsequently became care homes. The road had been turnpiked mid-century, and there was a toll-house near The Flying Bull.

=== 20th and 21st centuries ===
In 1986 there was a double murder on Chapel Common, Rake, where Peter Thurgood and Lindy Benstead were shot. It remains unsolved, despite an appeal by the BBC in 2021, and is one of Britain's oldest cold cases.

Amenities in the 20th century were various - Rake working Men's Club existed from 1920 to 1979; The George Street Trust for Milland and Rake was set up in 1962 for the prevention and relief of poverty; a police house existed in the village for most of the 20th century; Rake Store existed at least from 2005 to 2012, then from 2013 to 2015, when it closed permanently. For part of this time it hosted the village post office, but this was transferred to a Post Office Outreach Service at the garden centre, but this was withdrawn in 2025.

The former Sun Inn closed in 2011, and became residential. The former Red Lion pub was renamed Court Barn and for 50 years had housed a greyhound-rehoming trust, but closed in 2025. In 2021, properties in the village averaged £687,000. The Flying Bull pub and hotel was advertised for sale in February 2026 for £625,000.

In what was declared to be a record planning application, plans to build 68 new homes on the site of the closed Heathmount Nursing Home and two neighbouring care homes were being considered in 2025. Heathmount had recently been used for police dog training; the entire site covers 2.7 ha.

== Geography ==
Rake is split between two counties (Hampshire and West Sussex), two parishes (Liss and Rogate) and two district councils (East Hampshire and Chichester). A detailed GENUKI map shows the splits, and the extent of housing and amenities in the village. Most of the developments along the main road are in West Sussex, though most of the properties at the end of the 19th century were on the Hampshire side of the road.

The village lies within the South Downs National Park and features in its development plans for 2021-2033 and 2017-2035.

Rake Hanger is a site of special scientific interest (SSSI).

There are considerable areas of woodland and common land surrounding the village, which has an elevation range of 122 to 160m. The village is on the Serpent Trail.

== Governance ==
The eastern part of Rake, in West Sussex, comes under Chichester District, while the western part, in Hampshire, comes under East Hampshire. Similarly, with civil parishes, the eastern part of Rake falls into the Rogate Parish Council's area, while the western part falls under Liss Parish Council.

== Listed buildings ==
There are five listed buildings in Rogate parish and three in Liss parish.

- Mangers Farmhouse (Grade II) dates back to the late C16, but was restored in the C19 and C20.
- Little Langley Farmhouse (Grade II) is C17 or earlier; its outbuildings are later, C18-19.
- Langley Court (Grade II) is part C17, but mostly C19.
- Brewells Farmhouse (Grade II) is C17, C18 and C19.
- Little Brewells (Grade II) is late C18, and mid and late C19.
- Combe Farmhouse (Grade II) is early C18.
- The Sun Inn (Grade II) dates from the late 18th century, or earlier; it was mentioned in a report of a crime which occurred in 1786.
- Rake War Memorial (Grade II) stands outside the village hall and is dedicated to the dead of two world wars. There are no names inscribed.

== Amenities ==
Rake has a village hall, and recreation ground, combined in a joint charity. It has a tennis club.

Rake Primary School is a Church of England school which has been at the location for over 100 years.

The last pub in the village, The Flying Bull, temporarily closed in 2025 owing to a bereavement, but a campaign is under way to reopen it. It is owned by Admiral Taverns.

There is a business park, with retail and servicing enterprises including a garden centre, wholesale nursery, car sales, garden machinery and other outlets, and some other independent businesses in the village. Langley Nursery's Buxus (Box) collection has National Collection status.

=== Worship ===
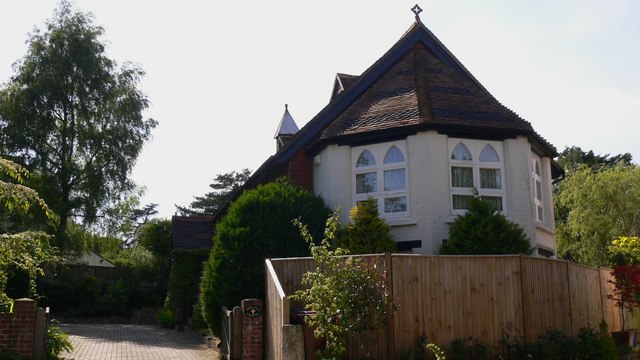
Old Chapel, Rake

In 1879, a mission chapel to St Luke's church, Milland, was built half way up the hill in Rake. The turret-topped Early English Gothic Revival red-brick building, by George Edmund Street, is now a private residence. A war memorial was erected outside the mission church in 1921, but was moved to the village hall when the church ceased services. Currently, Rake falls within two ecclesiastical parishes: on the Hampshire side is Liss parish, with its parish church of St Mary (in the Anglican Diocese of Portsmouth). On the Sussex side is the ecclesiastical parish of Milland and Rake (Diocese of Chichester), whose parish church is St Luke, located off the B2070 halfway between the villages of Rake and Milland. The Victorian church was built on this site, close to the ancient Tuxlith Chapel, to serve both villages.

A temple complex in Brewell's Lane for White Eagle Lodge, a spiritual organisation, was completed in 2023.

== Transport ==
The main road through the village is the B2070 (formerly the A3 road) and is called London Road, from its former function as the trunk road between London and Portsmouth.

Portsmouth Direct line railway stations at Liss and Liphook are each three miles away.
