= Hill Brow =

Village in Hampshire, England

Coordinates: 51.032294°N 0.875622°W

- Location within Hampshire
- OS grid reference: SU788265
- Civil parish: Liss
- District: East Hampshire
- Shire county: Hampshire
- Region: South East
- Country: England
- Sovereign state: United Kingdom
- Post town: Liss
- Postcode district: GU33 7
- Dialling code: 01730
- Police: Hampshire and Isle of Wight
- Fire: Hampshire and Isle of Wight
- Ambulance: South Central

Hill Brow is a small village in the East Hampshire district of Hampshire, England. It is 4 miles (6.4 km) northwest of Rogate, 1 mile (1.6 km) southwest of Rake, 0.5 miles (0.80 km) southeast of Liss and 3 miles (4.8 km) northeast of Petersfield on the Hampshire/West Sussex border. It is on the B2070 road, formerly the A3 London to Portsmouth road. It is in the civil parish of Liss.
