= Dureford Abbey =

Premonstratensian monastery in Sussex, England

Coordinates: 51.004°N 0.892°W

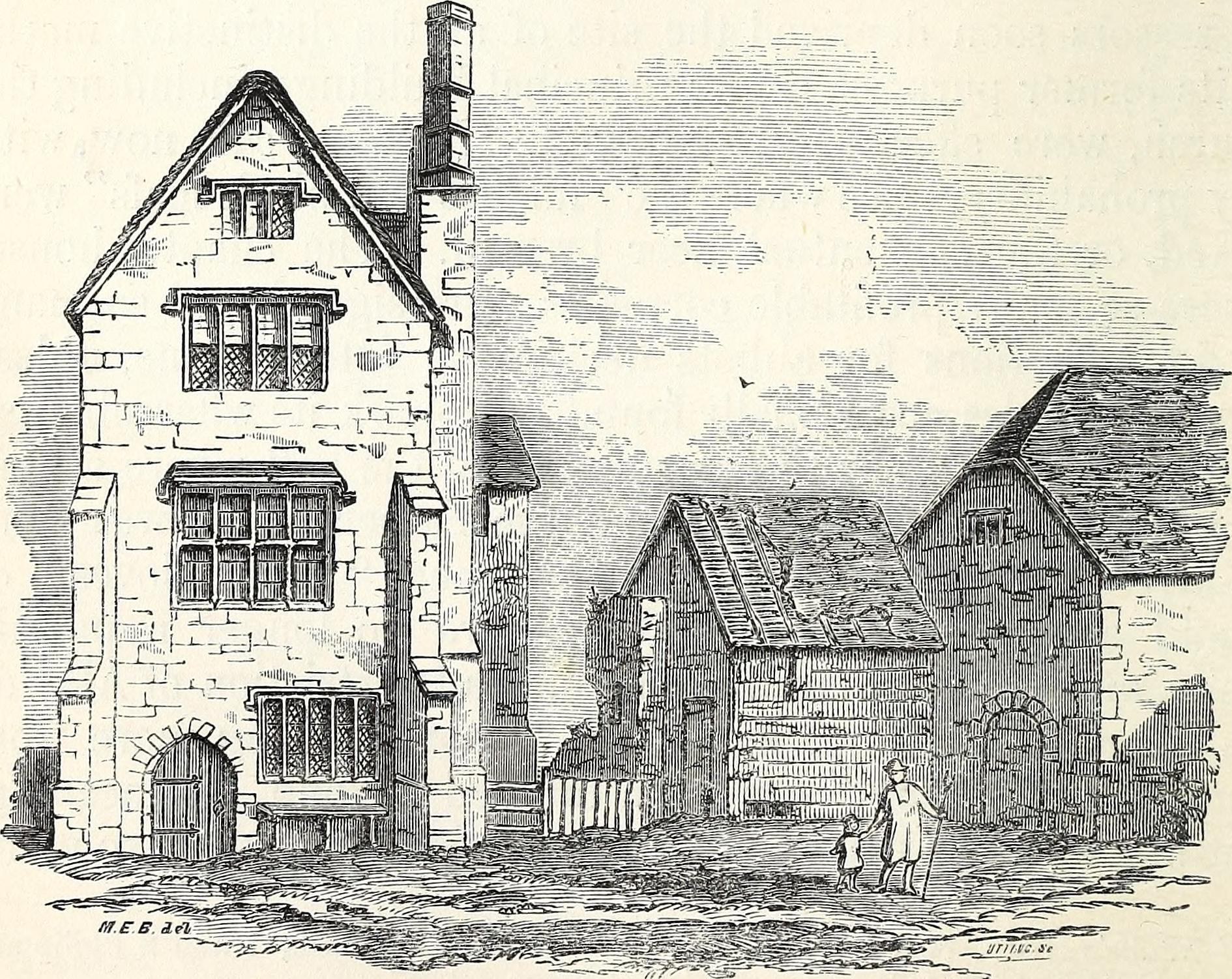
Remains of Dureford Abbey in a woodcut of 1856 taken from a drawing of 1782

Dureford Abbey, or Durford Abbey, in Sussex, England, was a Premonstratensian monastery. It was founded by Henry Hussey, who in 1161 granted land to the abbot of Welbeck Abbey, to establish the new community near Rogate, Sussex.

== History ==
The founder and other local landowners granted much additional land in the area to the abbey and the unlimited use of a quarry from which to construct the monastic buildings.

In 1317, the abbot complained that the abbey had been robbed. A royal visit by the King in 1324 put a further strain on the finances, as did repeated incidents of theft and malicious damage, which left the community reportedly poverty stricken by 1335.

The next century was the same; in 1417, the tower of Abbey Church was struck by lightning and collapsed. Further, an abbot was forcibly ejected from his position by canons from Dureford and from Bayham Abbey. He apparently left in fear for his life, and additionally, the canons of Bayham stole £400 worth of goods, including vestments.

In 1444, abbot Stephen Mersey was deposed for neglecting the monastery buildings and for plunging the abbey into debt.

On three occasions in the 1450s, the abbey was invaded by Sir Henry Hussey (a patron of the monastery and descendant of the founder), who came with an armed band and threatened to burn the monastery and kill the abbot. As it was, he murdered one of the abbey servants.

By 1482, the abbey debts had been wiped out. Unfortunately, so had most of the community, who had died in an outbreak of the plague or black death. There were further burnings of the buildings, resulting in more debt, and the cloister was reportedly in a ruinous state. In 1497, the canons were criticised for being lax in their duties and for leaving the monastery grounds.

By 1535, the monetary system was dilapidated and in considerable debt and was referred to mockingly as 'Dirtforde' by Richard Layton, one of the king's officials, who visited it. That same year, the abbey's income was assessed in the Valor Ecclesiasticus, Henry VIII's great survey of church finances, at £108 13s. 9d, which meant the following year that it came under the terms of the first Suppression Act, Henry's initial move in the society. In 1536 the abbey was closed by the king, and the site was granted to Sir William Fitzwilliam. The last abbot, John Sympson, was appointed head of Titchfield Abbey in Hampshire but resigned in less than a year. He was later given the living of Horsted Keynes.

== Post Dissolution ==
A farmhouse built in 1784 now occupies the site, and fragments of carved stone and a coffin lid are among the few visible remnants. The only surviving building is that of a medieval barn, and there are some fragmentary remains of a watermill nearby.

== See also ==
- Abbeys and priories in England
- Geoffrey Pole
