= Rogate =

Village and parish in West Sussex, England

Coordinates: 51.00809°N 0.85068°W

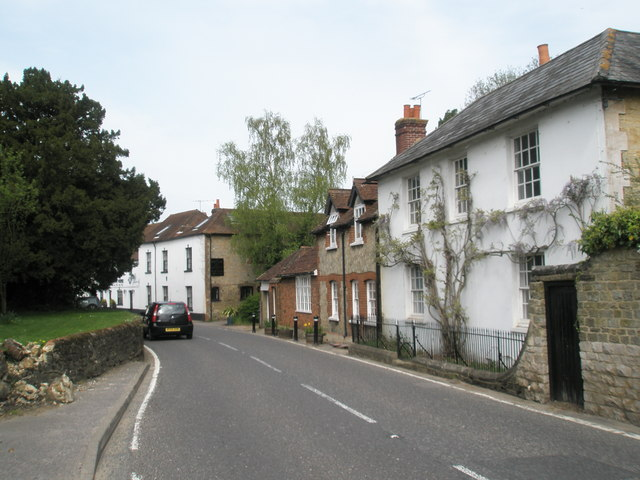
- The narrow road through Rogate, where there is frequent damage to the graveyard wall

- Location within West Sussex
- Area: 23.17 km^{2} (8.95 sq mi)
- Population: 1,556 (2011)
  - Density: 65/km^{2} (170/sq mi)
- OS grid reference: SU807238
  - London: 47 miles (76 km) NE
- Civil parish: Rogate
- District: Chichester
- Shire county: West Sussex
- Region: South East
- Country: England
- Sovereign state: United Kingdom
- Post town: PETERSFIELD
- Postcode district: GU31
- Dialling code: 01730
- Police: Sussex
- Fire: West Sussex
- Ambulance: South East Coast
- UK Parliament: Chichester
- Website: http://www.rogateparishcouncil.gov.uk/

Rogate is a village and civil parish in the Chichester district of West Sussex, England, in the Western Rother valley. The village is on the A272 road 5.6 miles (9.0 km) west of Midhurst and 5 miles (8.0 km) east of Petersfield, Hampshire. The civil parish includes the villages of Rogate and part of Rake and the hamlets of Haben or Habin, Fyning, Hill Brow, Langley, Durford, Wenham, Durleighmarsh and Terwick Common.

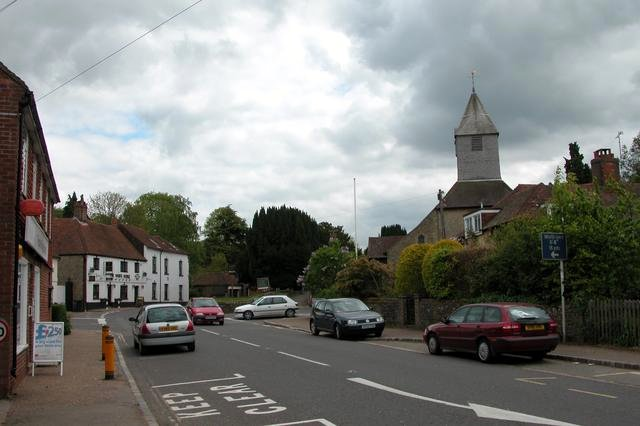
Rogate village centre showing the general store/Post Office and St Bartholomew's Church, with the White Horse pub in the background

== History ==
Rogate is not mentioned by name in the Domesday Book of 1086, but was assumed to be part of Harting Manor. It was in the Hundred of Dumpford, and Chichester rape, diocese and archdeaconry. It was in the Midhurst union, county court district and rural deanery. During the reign of Edward III (1327-1377) it was held by Ralph de Camois who was granted a charter for a fair.

Until the passing of the Counties (Detached Parts) Act 1844, part of the parish of Rogate was an exclave of the county of Sussex within Hampshire. This was a large farm called Bohunt, just south-west of Liphook. Also, a small exclave of Hampshire and the parish of Bramshott called Crouch House Farm was in the north-east corner of Rogate parish and was transferred to it.

In 1861 the population of Rogate parish was 990, and the area was 4,873 acres (19.72 km^{2}). An annual fair was held on 27 September.

In the 2001 census the civil parish covered 5,721 acres (23.15 km^{2}) and had 623 households with a total population of 1,513. 716 residents were economically active.

== Governance ==
An electoral ward in the same name exists. This ward includes Milland and at the 2011 census had a total population of 2,447.

== Amenities ==
=== Worship ===
The parish of Rogate is Anglican and the church is dedicated to St Bartholomew. Parish registers date from 1558.

The ancient parish of Terwick is included in Rogate and the northern part of the parish is in the ecclesiastical parish of Milland. The church of St Peter, Terwick, lies close to the A272 main road to Midhurst.

=== Education ===
There are primary schools in both Rogate and Rake. In 2008 Rogate School was the subject of a successful campaign to overturn a council recommendation to close the school. In October 2019 the school was deemed 'Good' by Ofsted.

=== Community centres ===
Both Rogate and Rake have village halls.

=== Pubs ===
The only pub in Rogate village is the White Horse, following the closure of the Wyndham Arms. The Jolly Drover at Hill Brow and The Flying Bull at Rake on the old London to Portsmouth road lie just within the parish and county boundary, which runs through the middle of The Flying Bull pub. In 2011 the Sun Inn closed and in 2012 planning permission was granted for conversion to two houses for residential use. Rake had another pub, now closed: The Red Lion, opposite The Flying Bull on the London Road, which was the scene of a murder in 1748.

=== Farm ===
Durleighmarsh (pick your own) farm and farm shop are noted for asparagus, strawberries, runner beans and squash.
