= Chiswick School of Art =

Defunct art school in London, England

Coordinates: 51.496°N 0.253°W

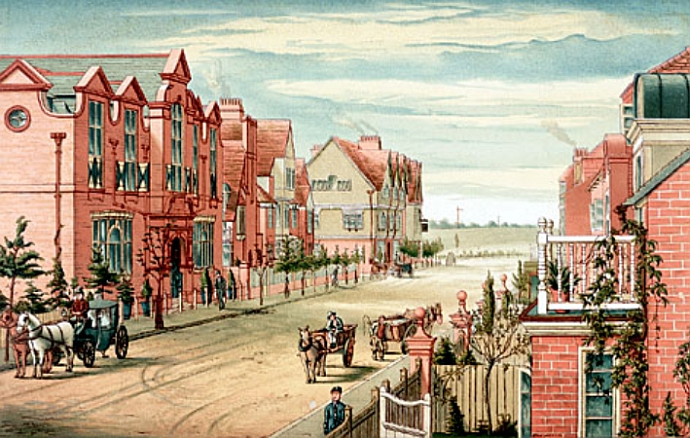
School of Art, Stores and Tabard Inn by Thomas Erat Harrison, 1882

The Chiswick School of Art, sometimes called the Chiswick School of Art and Science, was an art school in Bath Road, Bedford Park, London, from 1881 until 1899, which was then merged into the Acton and Chiswick Polytechnic. In 1928, it became the Chiswick Polytechnic and, in 1976, it was merged into the West London Institute of Higher Education (on other sites). In 1986, the Bath Road site was acquired by Arts Educational Schools.

== Origins ==
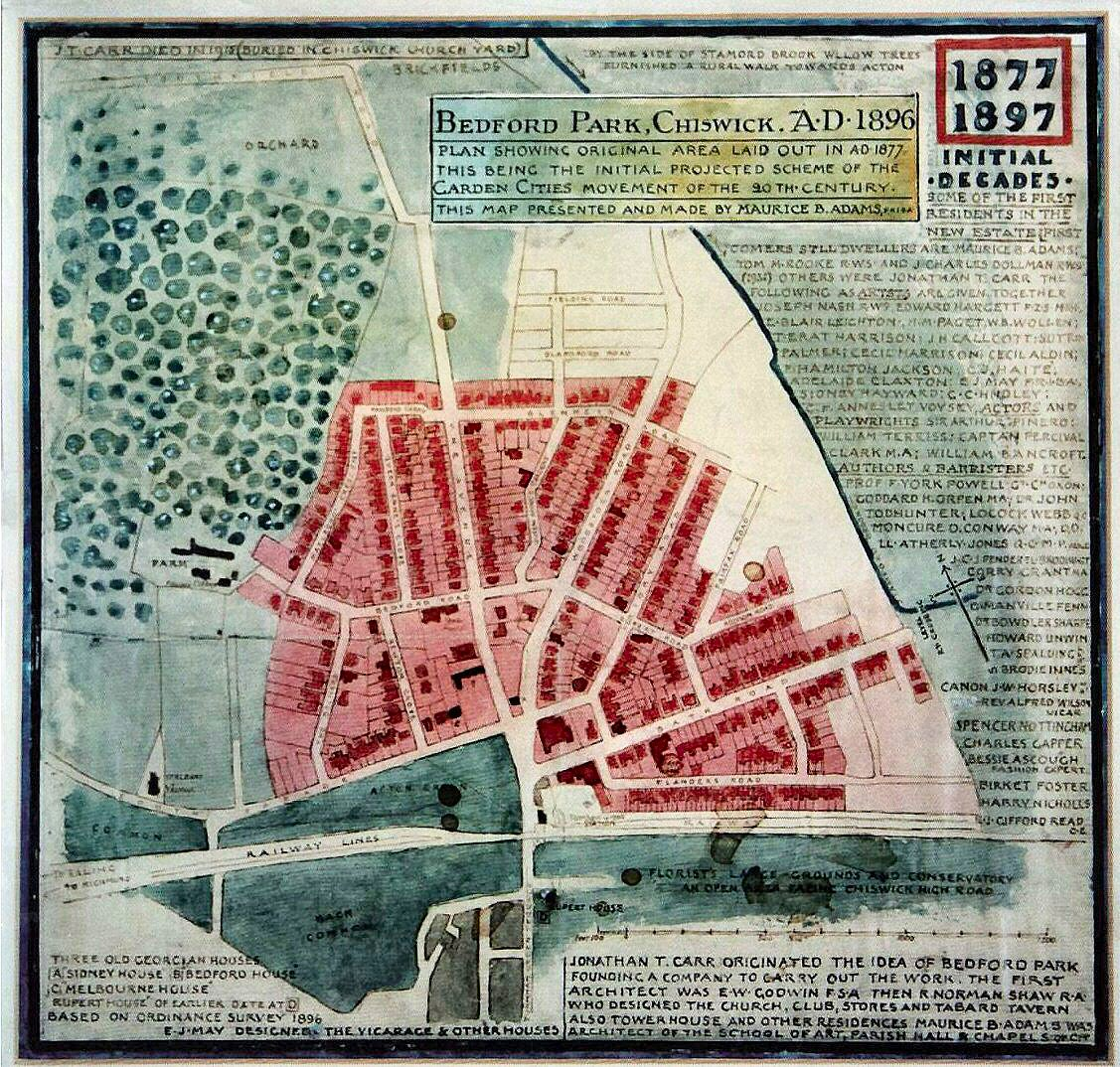
Maurice Bingham Adams's map of Bedford Park, 1897

The development of Bedford Park as a garden suburb was made possible by the creation of the District Line in 1869. The lead developer was Jonathan Carr, who in 1875 bought 24 acres (9.7 ha) of land just north of the new Turnham Green Station. The City of London was then thirty minutes away by steam train.

The school was planned to help to give the new garden suburb a sense of community. The arts and crafts architect Maurice Bingham Adams was commissioned to design a School of Art building, which was completed on Bath Road in 1881, near the new Tabard Inn, Richard Norman Shaw's St Michael and All Angels Church, and a shop.

The school was formally opened on Saturday, 19 November 1881, and this was followed by an evening party with the Conservative member of parliament Alexander Beresford Hope presiding.

The new building was illustrated by Thomas Erat Harrison in a book of 1882 called Bedford Park.

== History ==
At the outset, the school taught "Freehand drawing in all its branches, practical Geometry and perspective, pottery and tile painting, design for decorative purposes – as in Wall-papers, Furniture, Metalwork, Stained Glass".

By 1887, the name of the school had become the Chiswick School of Art and Science, and in November of that year new classes were announced in Chemistry, Steam, and Electricity.

In 1899, the school was taken over by Middlesex County Council to become part of the new Acton and Chiswick Polytechnic. In 1928, the two branches of this were separated, so that the building in Bedford Park became the home of the Chiswick Polytechnic.

The building was destroyed by a V-1 flying bomb in 1944, but a new Chiswick Polytechnic rose from the ashes. In 1976, this was merged into the West London Institute of Higher Education. In 1986, the site was acquired by Arts Educational Schools.

== Notable students ==
Students included Jack Butler Yeats, his sisters Elizabeth and Susan Yeats, and Bruce Angrave.

== Gallery ==
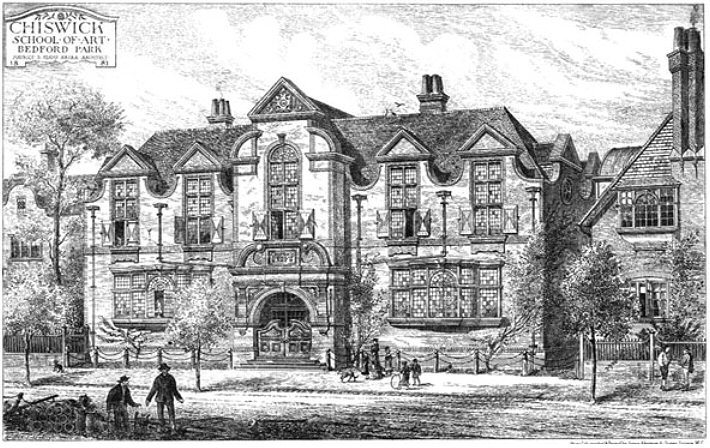
Design for the School by Maurice Bingham Adams, 1881

The community buildings
