= Chiswick Polytechnic =

Chiswick Polytechnic may refer to:

- The name used by the former campus of Chiswick School of Art from 1928 to 1944
- The name used by a precursor of the West London Institute of Higher Education on the same site until 1976
