= Jonathan Carr (property developer) =

English property developer (1845–1915)

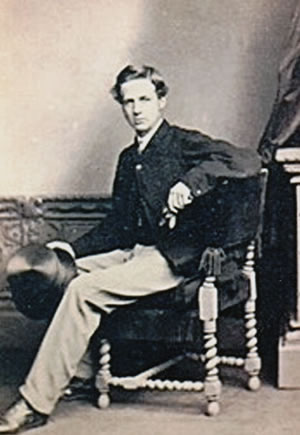
Carr, aged 19 in 1864

Jonathan Thomas Carr (1845–1915) was an English cloth merchant turned property developer and speculator. He is remembered for founding the Bedford Park garden suburb in Chiswick, west London. While he probably was not made bankrupt by that development, he later received a record-breaking 342 bankruptcy petitions.

== Life ==
=== Background and character ===
Jonathan Thomas Carr was born in 1845. His father was a cloth merchant in the City of London, known for his radical political views; Jonathan inherited a share of his business. His brother was the Grosvenor Gallery art critic and dramatist J. Comyns Carr. His sister studied art at the Slade School of Art. In 1873 he married Agnes Fulton (1849-1902), whose father Hamilton Henry Fulton, a civil engineer, was one of the few inhabitants of the Bedford Park estate before it was developed, living in Bedford House, which had 24 acres of land. The architectural history author Mark Girouard writes that his family seem to have found him an embarrassment, suggesting that their description of Carr as "genial and optimistic" was a euphemistic gloss for "specious and not altogether honest". Carr seems to have been a difficult person to do business with; the architect Norman Shaw soon resigned as estate architect, apparently exasperated, either by Carr's tight requirements or by his late payments.

=== Speculation and bankruptcy ===
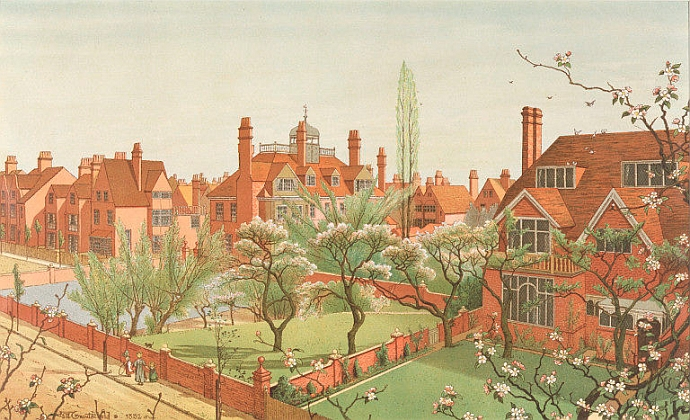
Painting of Carr's large property in Bedford Park, Tower House (centre), by Manfred Trautschold, 1882

It is popularly supposed that the Bedford Park development brought Carr to bankruptcy, but this is not supported by the evidence: he extended the estate with an extra 89 acres, took out a £200,000 mortgage on it, and in 1881 sold all of it to a new company, Bedford Park Ltd, which he managed but held no shares in. The company was wound up in 1886, and Carr worked on other development projects including the Kensington Court estate and the Whitehall Court land. He kept his large 16-roomed house, Tower House in Bedford Park, all his life. He continued to speculate in property, and received 342 bankruptcy petitions, a record. Both the Kensington Court and the Whitehall Court developments proved to be too risky, and by 1888 Carr's creditors had taken over both of them. Carr died in February 1915.

=== Developing Bedford Park ===
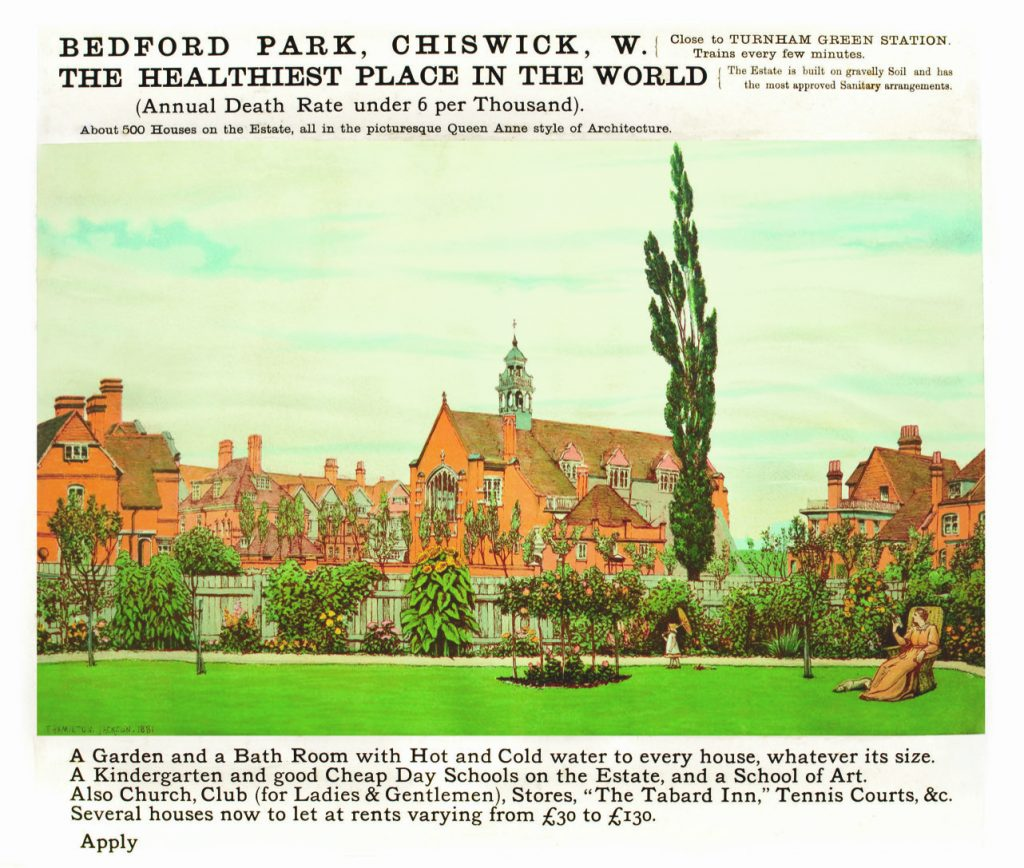
Carr's promotion of 'Bedford Park, Chiswick, W. the Healthiest Place in the World': coloured lithograph by Frederick Hamilton Jackson, c. 1882

The decision to develop the Bedford Park estate was made either by Carr privately, or in partnership with his father-in-law Hamilton Fulton, in 1875. Carr engaged some of England's best architects to design Bedford Park's houses and community buildings, starting with E. W. Godwin and the Scottish firm Coe and Robinson, but when their designs were criticised by the architectural press, he soon afterwards engaged Norman Shaw as estate architect. Shaw set the tone for the entire development.

The architecture of Bedford Park is described as British Queen Anne Revival, meaning a mixture of designs in red brick based on English and Flemish domestic architecture, often with tile-hung gables, and often with white-painted roughcast for part of the surface.

Carr commissioned the artist F. Hamilton Jackson to create publicity images for the development; one of them, showing the estate's church and neighbouring red brick buildings, has become "iconic".

== Reception ==
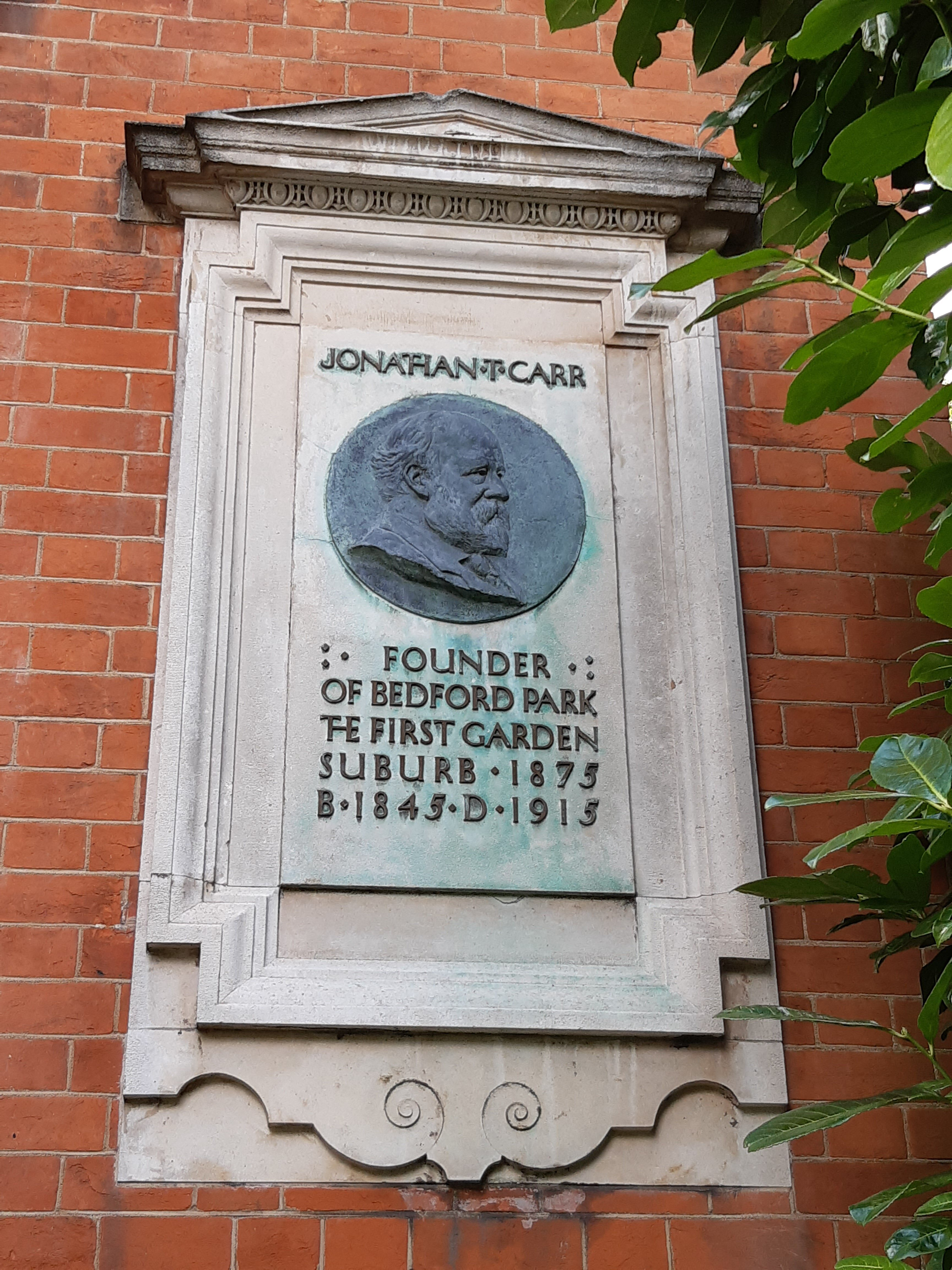
Jonathan Carr plaque on the wall of St Michael and All Angels Church, Bedford Park

Carr's work at Bedford Park was both admired and mocked. The journalist and author G. K. Chesterton jokingly compared Carr's red brick Bedford Park with John Burgon's 1845 poem Petra, "Match me such marvel save in Eastern clime, A rose-red city half as old as time", writing "Match me this marvel save where aesthetes are, A rose-red suburb half as old as Carr".

In 1881, St James's Gazette published the humorous Ballad of Bedford Park, seemingly penned by a resident of the garden suburb, which began:

In London town there lived a man
a gentleman was he
Whose name was Jonathan T. Carr
(as has been told to me).

'This London is a foggy town'
(thus to himself said he),
'Where bricks are black, and trees are brown
and faces are dirtee.'

'I will seek out a brighter spot',
continued Mr. Carr.
'Not too near London, and yet not
what might be called too far.'

'Tis there a village I'll erect
with Norman Shaw's assistance
Where men may lead a chaste correct
aesthetical existence.
