= Berry F. Berry =

English painter and book illustrator

Berry Francis Berry (3 December 1852 – 4 December 1926) was an English painter and book illustrator. He was born in Barrow Hill, St John's Wood, London, to George Berry and Ann Woods. On 24 June 1880 he married Amy Palmer Goodall in Fulham, London; they moved to Chiswick and had four children. In 1895 he was principal of "The Berry Art School" at 86 Fellows Road, Swiss Cottage, offering tuition in drawing and painting, the main element being life drawing. Landscape classes were offered in summer. Berry illustrated F. A. S. Reid's 1881 children's book Comic Insects, published by Frederick Warne. He contributed a painting to an 1882 book Bedford Park, celebrating the then-fashionable garden suburb of that name. He died in 1926 in South Hampstead, London.

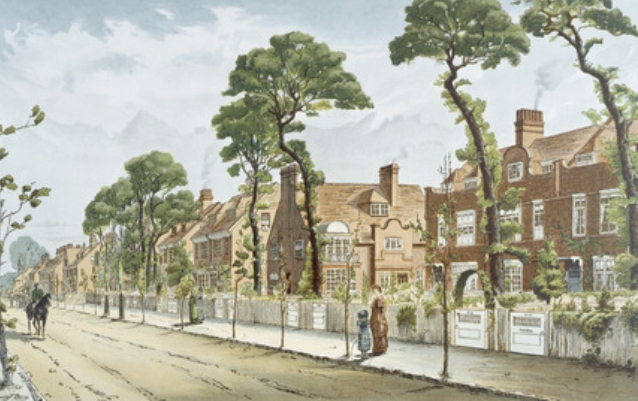
Bath Road, Chiswick looking east, 1882

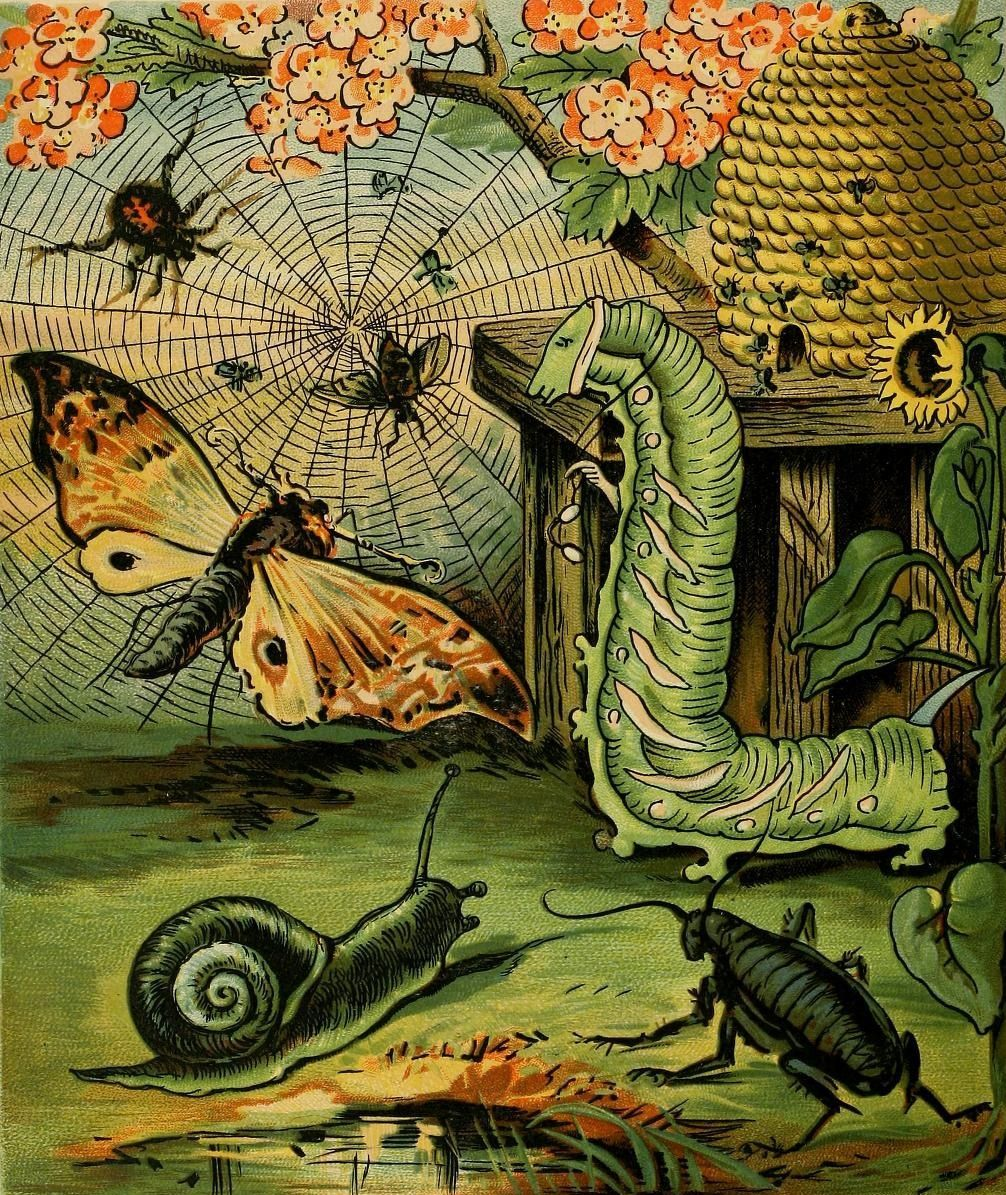
One of the illustrations for F. A. S. Reid's Comic Insects, 1882

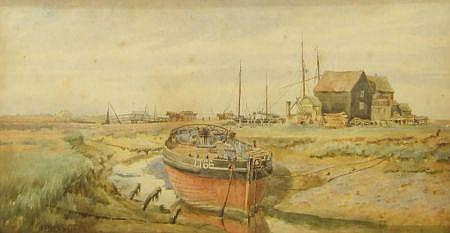
A Beached Lowestoft Fishing-Boat, 1887
