= Joseph Nash =

English painter (1809–1878)

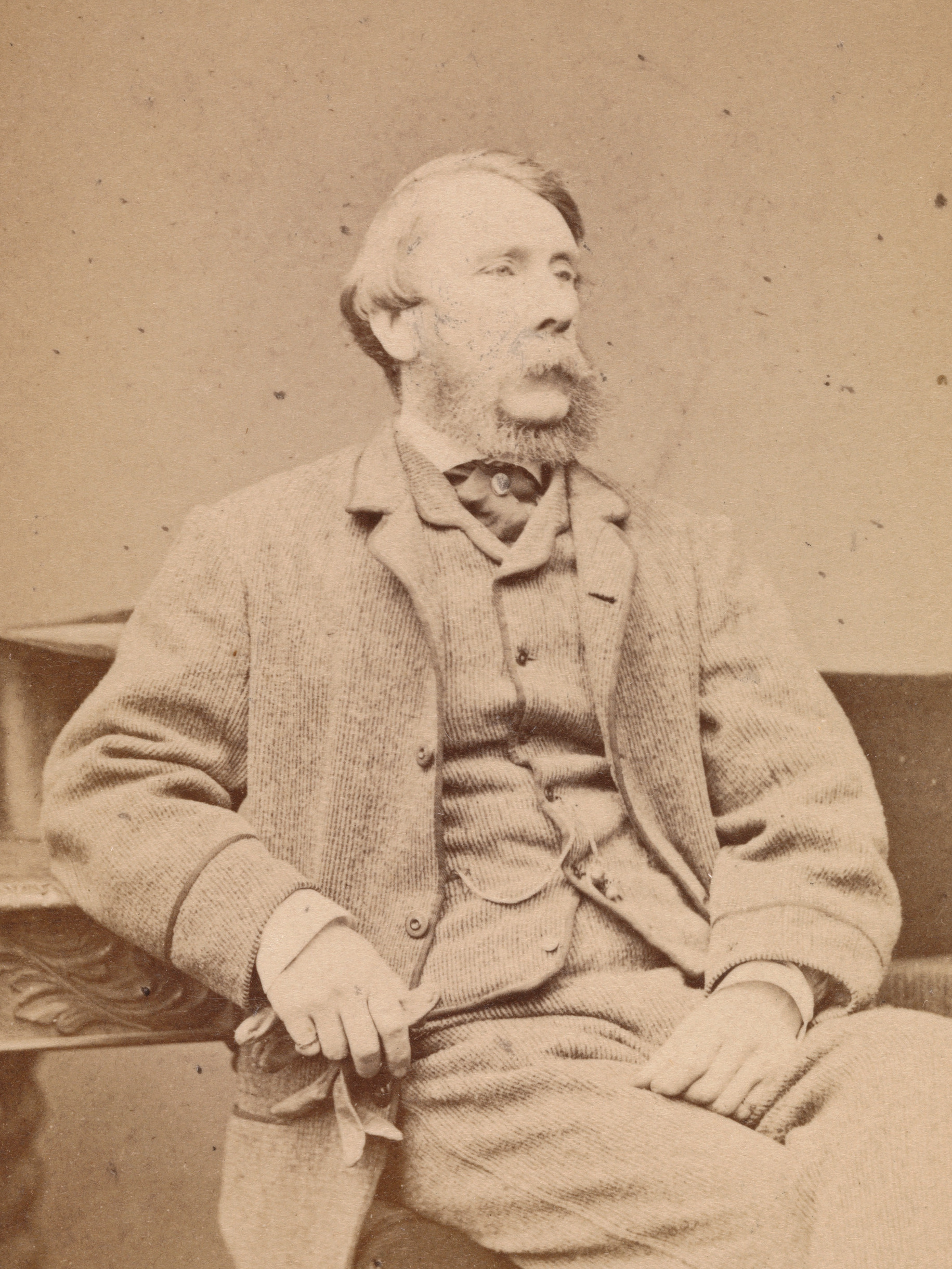
- Born: 17 December 1809; Great Marlow, Buckinghamshire
- Died: 19 December 1878 (aged 69)
- Education: Studied with Augustus Charles Pugin
- Known for: Lithography

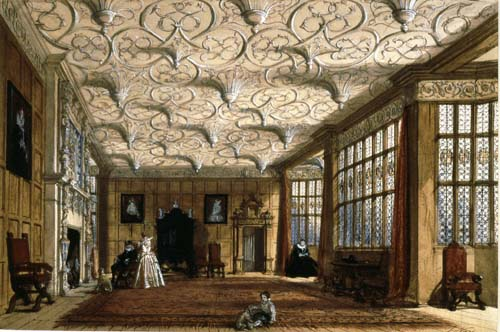
The withdrawing room of Bramall Hall, Cheshire.

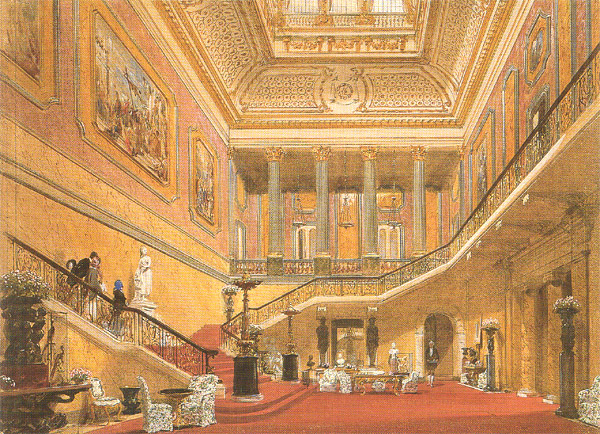
Stafford House (now Lancaster House, London) central hall and principal staircase, 1850.

Joseph Nash (17 December 1809 – 19 December 1878) was an English watercolour painter and lithographer, specialising in historical buildings. His major work was the 4-volume Mansions of England in the Olden Time, published from 1839–49.

== Biography ==
Nash was born in Great Marlow in Buckinghamshire, the oldest son of the Reverend Okey Nash who owned Manor House School in Croydon which Joseph went on to attend. He later studied with the artist and architect Augustus Charles Pugin, with whom he travelled to France to assist and prepare architectural drawings for a book entitled Paris and its Environs, published in 1830.

In the early stage of his career Nash was engaged on figure subjects illustrating the poets and novelists, and exhibited many drawings with the Society of Painters in Water Colours, of which he was elected an associate in 1834, and a full member in 1842. Of these pictures, some were engraved for The Keepsake and similar publications, but he later became well known for his picturesque views of late Gothic buildings, which he peopled with figures grouped to illustrate the everyday life of their owners in times gone by—somewhat in the manner of George Cattermole. Despite being involved in a number of disputes with the Society, he continued to exhibit his artwork there until 1875. He also exhibited at the Royal Academy, British Institution and the New Society of Painters in Water Colours.

Having mastered the art of lithography, Nash utilised it in the production of several excellent publications: Architecture of the Middle Ages appeared in 1838, and his four-volume masterpiece, Mansions of England in the Olden Time over a 10-year period from 1839, which involved Nash's travelling all over the country drawing house interiors and exteriors. He concentrated on the architectural aspects of the buildings, which, using the example of Joseph Strutt, he brought to life with the inclusion of groups of people. The volumes were very popular, with the lithographs circulated widely by newspapers, architects and other artists. The book was so effective it was claimed in Parliament that it was causing an increasing number of people to visit historical buildings.

In 1846 he lithographed David Wilkie's Oriental Sketches and in 1848 a set of views of Windsor Castle from his own drawings. Other works to which Nash contributed were Lawson's Scotland Delineated (1847–54), Comprehensive Pictures of the Great Exhibition of 1851, McDermot's The Merrie Days of England (1858–59), and English Ballads (1864).

In 1854 he was described as suffering from "brain fever" and sold his studio later that year—the quality of his work declined dramatically from then on. He died at Hereford Road, Bayswater, London on 19 December 1878, a few months after being awarded a civil list pension of £100.

== Joseph Nash Jr. ==
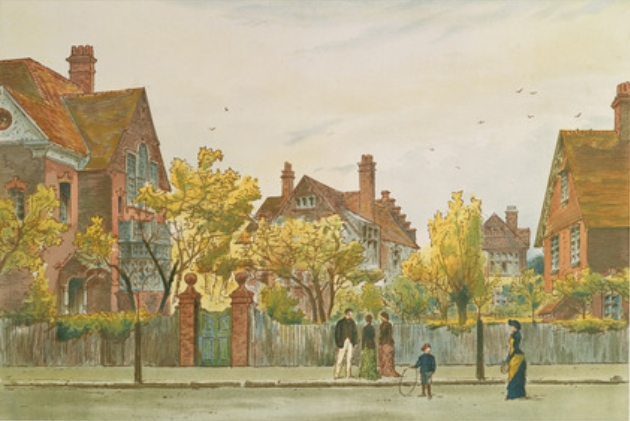
Newton Grove, Bedford Park by Joseph Nash Jr., 1882

His only son, Joseph Nash Jr., was a marine painter and a member of the Royal Institute of Painters in Water-Colours.
