= Thomas Affleck Greeves =

British artist and conservationist (1917 - 1997)

Thomas Affleck Greeves ARIBA
- Born: June 4, 1917; London, United Kingdom
- Died: August 31, 1997 (aged 80); London
- Education: Slade School of Fine Art; Cambridge School of Architecture; Architectural Association
- Notable work: Greeves Flying Machines (1966); The Concrete Pipe (1987)
- Style: Ruined architecture Capriccio
- Spouse: Eleanor Greeves (1924 - 2015)

Thomas Affleck Greeves (4 June 1917 – 31 August 1997) was a British artist, a draughtsman, and an architectural conservationist. Drawing inspiration from various Indian-style architecture, he published his drawings and exhibited them in London such as Greeves Flying Machines and A Steam Palace. He co-founded The Victorian Society, and subsequently founded the Bedford Park Society, both of which work towards architectural conservation in London. His drawings were of ruined architecture and capriccio (art) style.

== Biography ==
Born in London, Greeves studied architecture for an year at the Slade School of Fine Art, University College London followed by the Cambridge School of Architecture. His studies at the University of Cambridge were cut short by World War II in which he served with the Royal Engineers at the time in the British Raj. While in-service in India, he was influenced by the Gothic buildings which were designed by Sir Gilbert Scott for the University of Bombay. Returning to London after the war ended, Greeves finished his studies at the Architectural Association. He then worked for different architectural practices such as Lanchester & Lodge, Cachemaille-Day, and Edward Felix Goldsmith, but never practiced it on his own. For his architectural interest, Greeves also drew inspiration from the Mughal, Buddhist, and Portuguese colonial architecture. Among artists, he took inspiration from Piranesi's depiction of ruined buildings and Hugh Ferriss' skyscrapers.

As an artist (or draughtsman), Greeves in 1951 designed A Monument to Commemorate the Passing of the Good Old Days of Architecture for which he won the first place in a competition organised by Architects Benevolent Society (ABS). In 1966, Greeves Flying Machines was his first published drawing to be published in The Saturday Book, issue no. 26. In its next issue, a color drawing of A Steam Palace and Impelled Glider Ferry, both by Greeves, was published. Apart from The Saturday Book, his drawings were also published in Country Life, Architects' Journal, and in Arthur M. Edwards' 1981 work, The Design of Suburbia. His drawings were exhibited by the Royal Academy of Arts, Robin Garton Gallery (1978), and Garton & Cooke Gallery (1987).

Greeves also participated in the conservation effort towards Victorian and Edwardian architecture. He was one of the founding members of The Victorian Society in 1957, and the founder of the Bedford Park Society in Bedford Park, London, 1963. His published works include Bedford Park: The First Garden Suburb (1975) and Ruined Cities of the Imagination (1994).

Greeves met his wife, Eleanor Greeves (née Pryce) (1924 – 2015), in 1950 while studying at the Architectural Association, and both got married the same year. Also in this year, he was elected an Associate of the Royal Institute of British Architects (ARIBA) While initially they were living in a late-Victorian home in Bedford Park, they later moved to live in West London. Greeves died in London on 31 August 1997.

=== Art style ===
Apart from the ruined architecture style, Greeves also displayed capriccio style in his drawings which featured fantastical landscapes. One such notable example is The Concrete Pipe (1987) which features industrial ruins amid a Gothic landscape.
