= Bedford Park, London =

Suburban development in London, England

Coordinates: 51.5001°N 0.2617°W

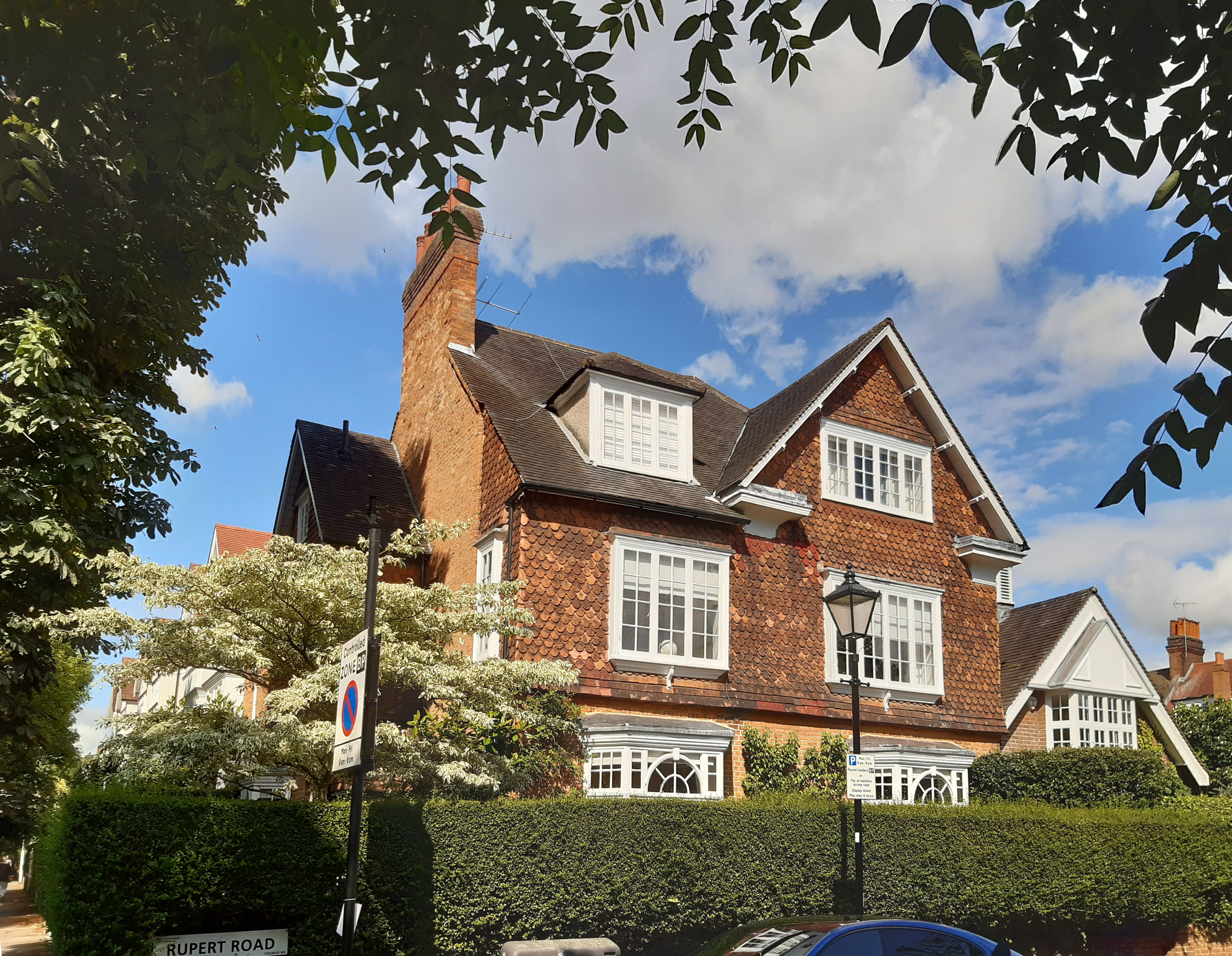
Leafy artists' suburb: a tile-hung detached house on Rupert Road, Bedford Park, by the architect Norman Shaw, 1879

Bedford Park is a suburban development in Chiswick, London, begun in 1875 under the direction of Jonathan Carr, with many large houses in British Queen Anne Revival style by Norman Shaw and other leading Victorian era architects including Edward William Godwin, Edward John May, Henry Wilson, and Maurice Bingham Adams. Its architecture is characterised by red brick with an eclectic mixture of features, such as tile-hung walls, gables in varying shapes, balconies, bay windows, terracotta and rubbed brick decorations, pediments, elaborate chimneys, and balustrades painted white.

The estate's main roads converge on its public buildings, namely its church, St Michael and All Angels; its club, now the London Buddhist Vihara; its inn, The Tabard, and next door its shop, the Bedford Park Stores; and its Chiswick School of Art, now replaced by the Arts Educational Schools.

Bedford Park has been described as the world's first garden suburb, creating a model of apparent informality emulated around the world. It became extremely fashionable in the 1880s, attracting artists including the poet and dramatist W. B. Yeats, the actor William Terriss, the actress Florence Farr, the playwright Arthur Wing Pinero and the painter Camille Pissarro to live on the estate. It appeared in the works of G. K. Chesterton and John Buchan, and was gently mocked in the St James's Gazette.

The development is protected by a conservation area in the London Borough of Ealing, and a smaller one in the London Borough of Hounslow. Over 350 of its buildings are Grade II listed; the church and the inn are Grade II*. The historian of London, Stephen Inwood, calls it probably the best garden suburb in London.

== Garden suburb ==
=== Development ===
Bedford Park's developer was Jonathan Carr, who in 1875 bought 24 acres (9.7 ha) of land just north of Turnham Green Station on the District Line, opened in 1869. The City of London was only 30 minutes away by steam train. The area included three existing Georgian houses: Bedford House (now on The Avenue) for which the new estate was named; Melbourne House, set back from South Parade; and Sidney House, which stood between The Avenue and Woodstock Road, and was replaced by a block of flats in the 1890s.

Pre-existing buildings

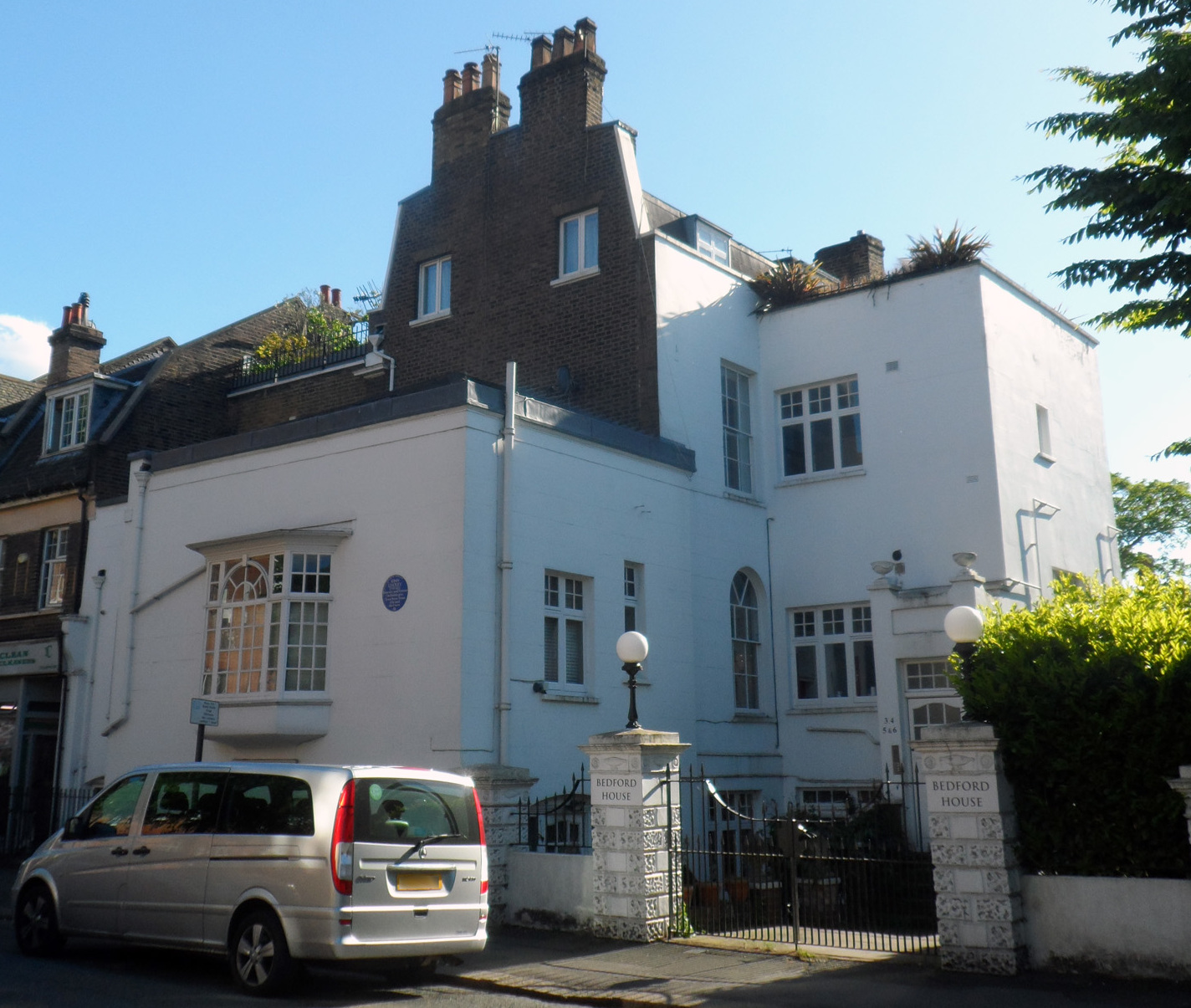
Bedford House, The Avenue, is an 18th-century house, lending its name to the estate which grew up around it.

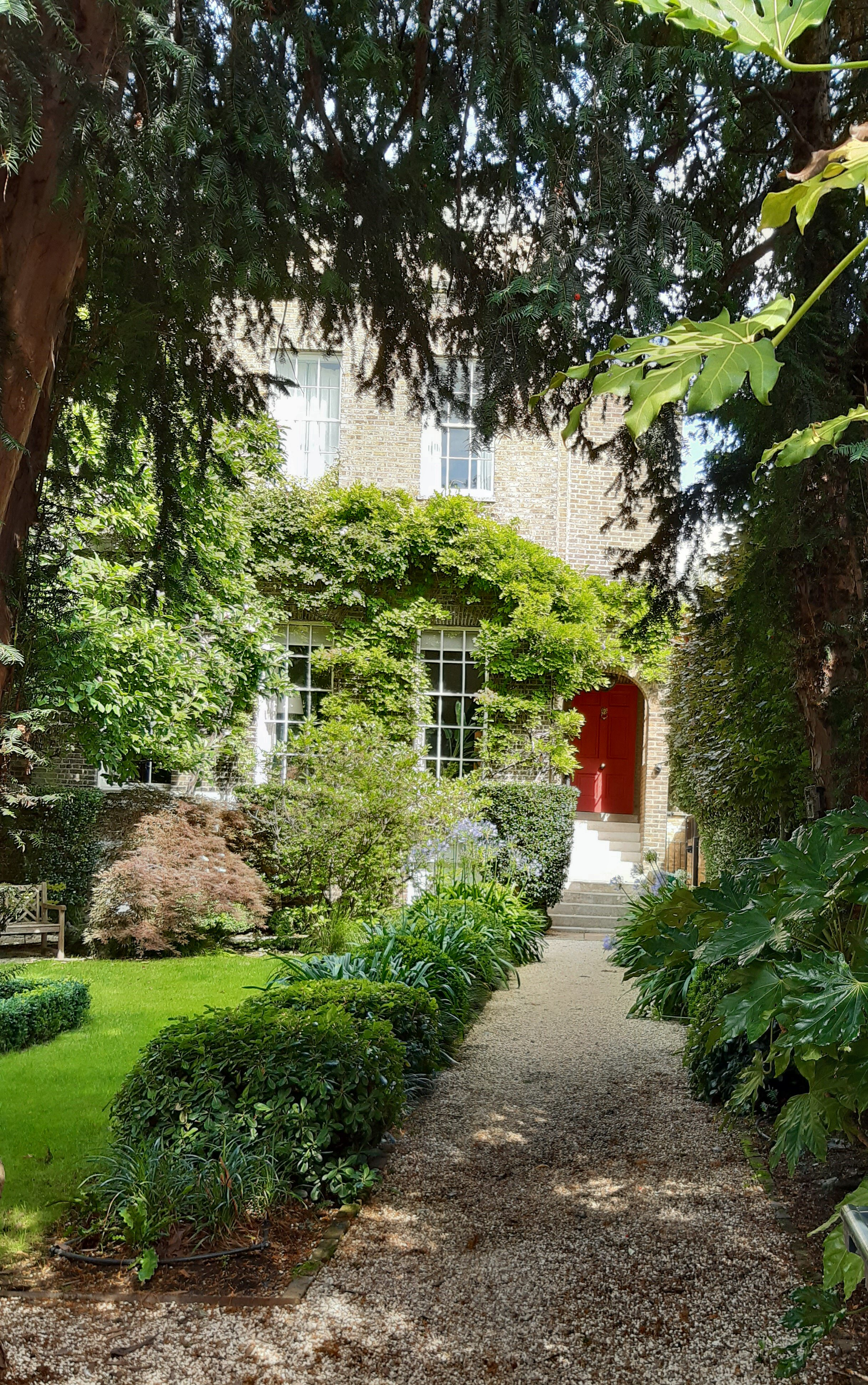
Melbourne House, South Parade was one of the few other existing houses on the estate.

The area covered by the estate's housing grew, and neighbouring areas were also developed. By 1883, Carr's 24 acres had become 113 acres (46 ha) acres, with almost 500 houses. By 1915 Bedford Park stretched from Esmond Road in the west to Abinger Road in the east, and from Flanders Road in the south to Fielding Road in the north; and where the estate had in 1877 been bordered by orchards and farmland, it had become part of an integrated network of streets.

=== Estate plan ===
Plan

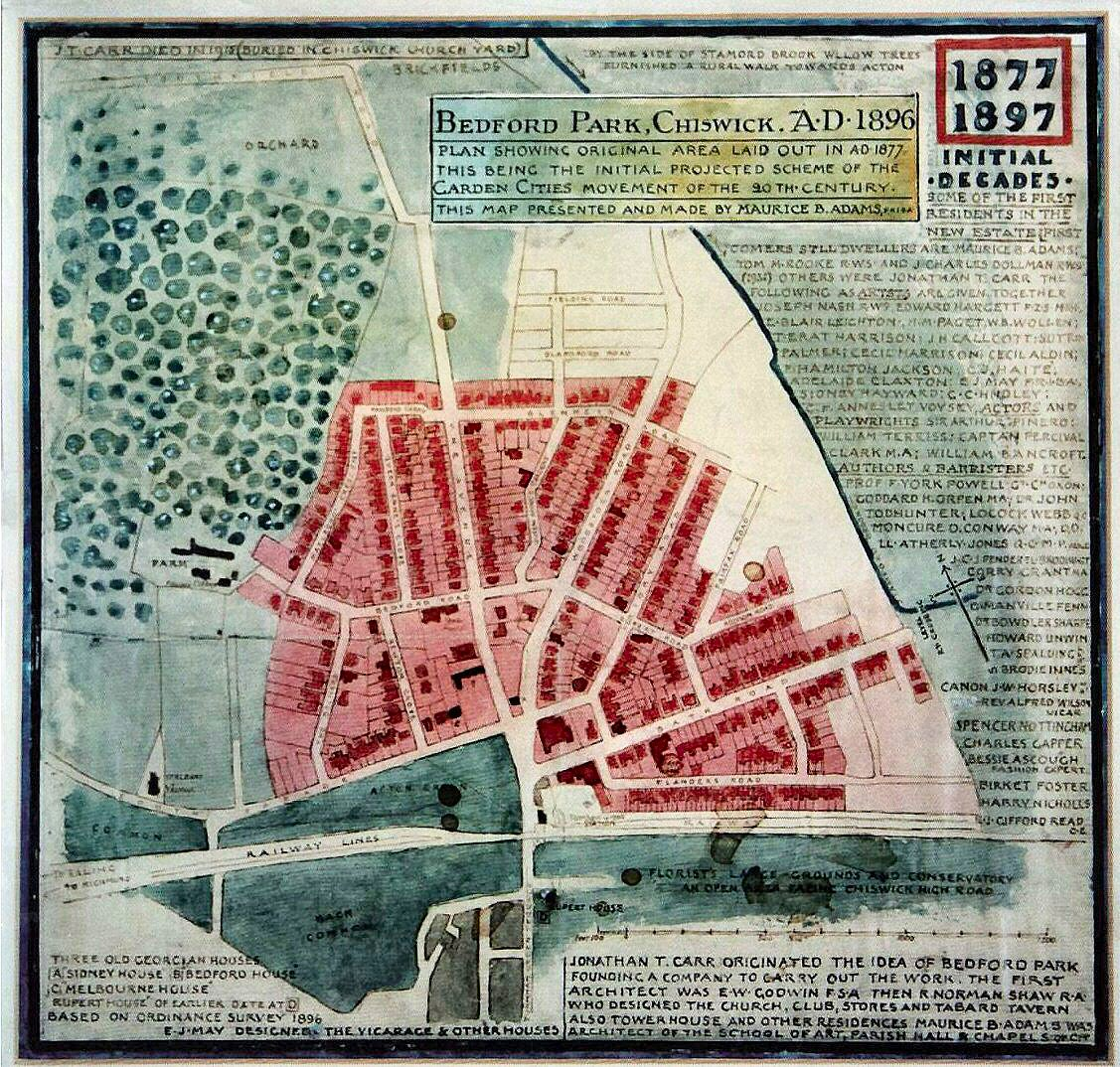
The architect Maurice Bingham Adams's map of Bedford Park, 1897

Locations of community buildings. The development was enabled by the arrival of the District Line in 1869.

The plan of the estate was of three main roads, namely The Avenue from the north, Woodstock Road from the northeast, and Bath Road from the east, which converged on the focal area with the new church, St Michael and All Angels, the new inn, The Tabard, its next-door neighbour the Bedford Park Stores, and an art school a little further up Bath Road. There was a club house, meant to be the social centre of the estate, on The Avenue, now much modified as the London Buddhist Vihara. The area at the western end of Bath Road was intended to be the centre of a village-like complex.

The focus of the estate

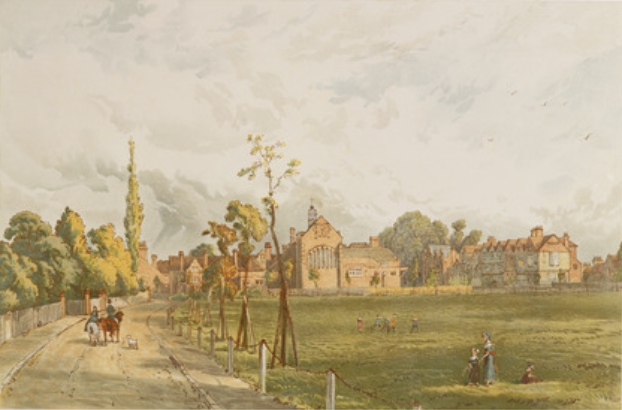
The Church, Tabard Inn and Stores from Acton Green by Edward Hargitt, 1882

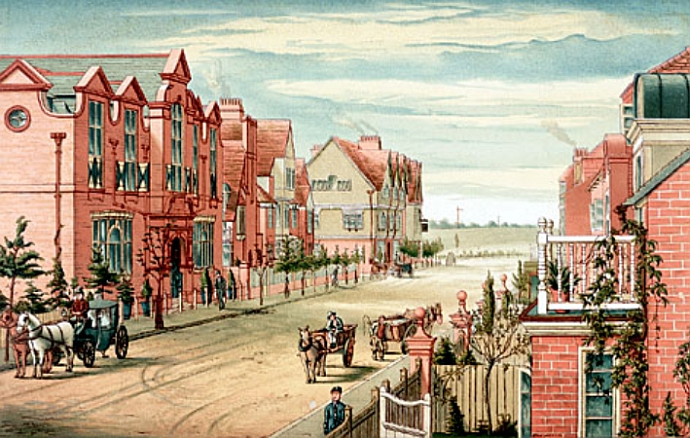
School of Art, Stores and Tabard Inn by Thomas Erat Harrison, 1882

=== Community buildings ===
The architect Norman Shaw set the style for the suburb with his early houses, and provided its focus with the community buildings. He designed the Stores, a private house, and the "Hostelry" as a single block with matching heights but varying architectural details. He designed the estate church, St Michael and All Angels, in a similar Queen Anne Revival style to his Bedford Park houses, an unusual choice for an ecclesiastical building, though incorporating a measure of Perpendicular Gothic.

The School of Art was designed by Maurice Bingham Adams. The school was meant to provide the estate with a feeling of community. It taught classes such as "Freehand drawing in all its branches, practical Geometry and perspective, pottery and tile painting, design for decorative purposes – as in Wall-papers, Furniture, Metalwork, Stained Glass".

The community buildings

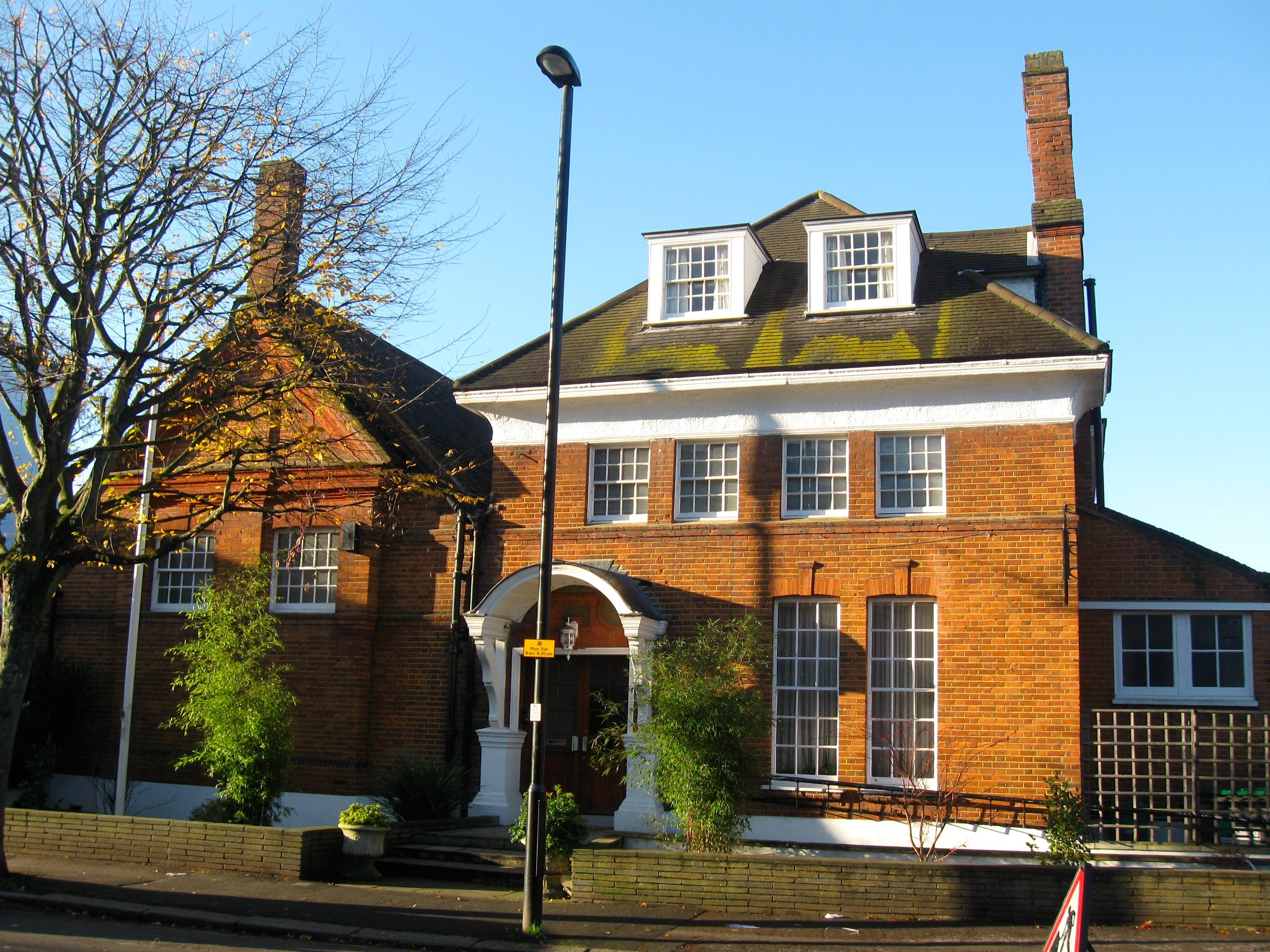
The estate club on The Avenue by Norman Shaw, 1878

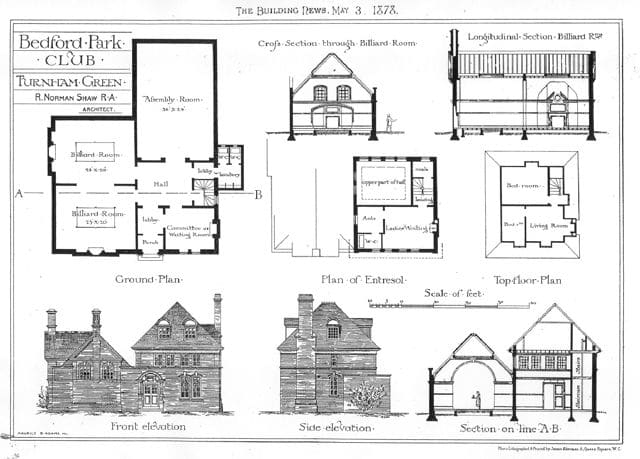
Shaw's 1878 plans for Bedford Park Club, with two billiard rooms

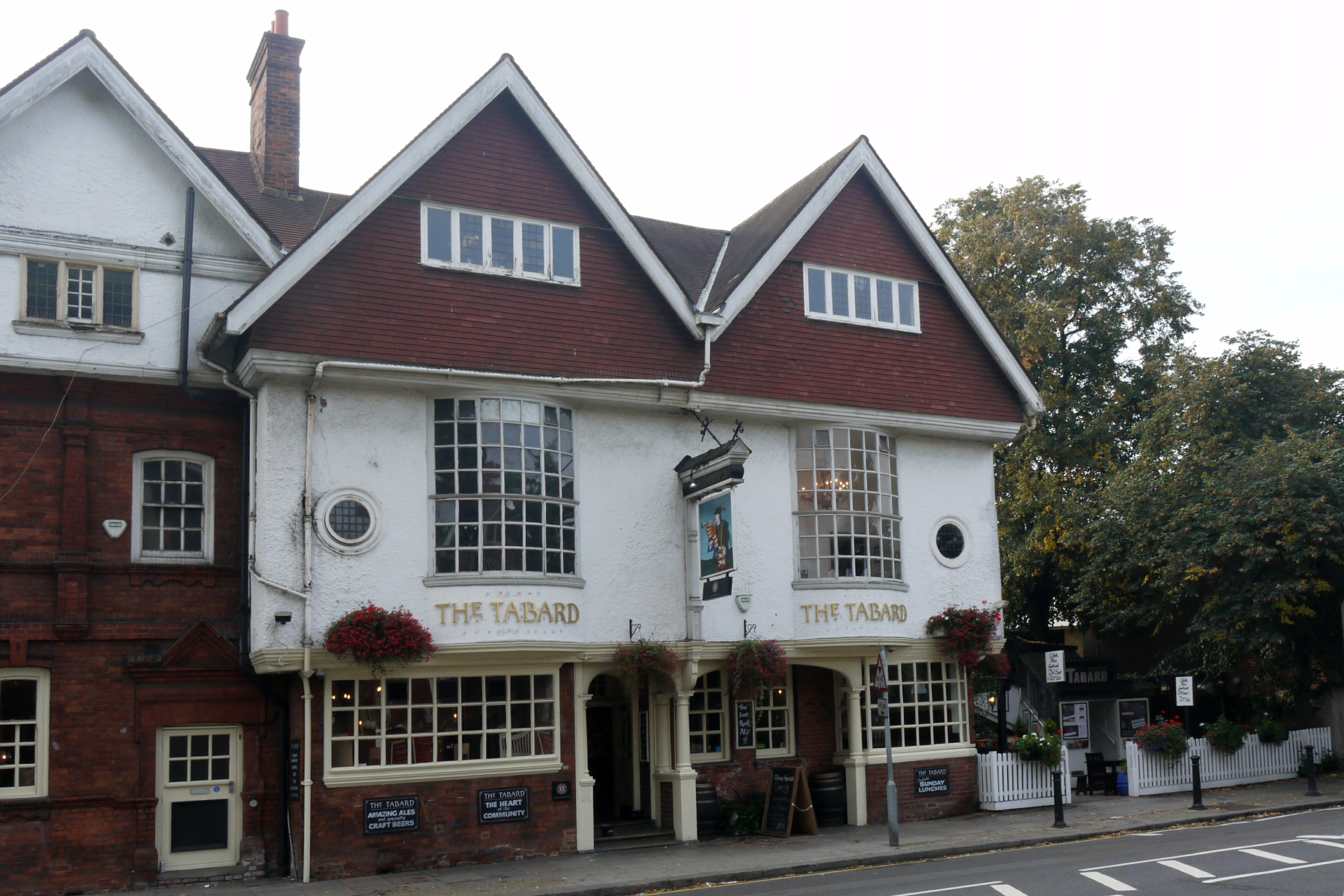
The estate inn, The Tabard by Shaw, Bath Road, 1879

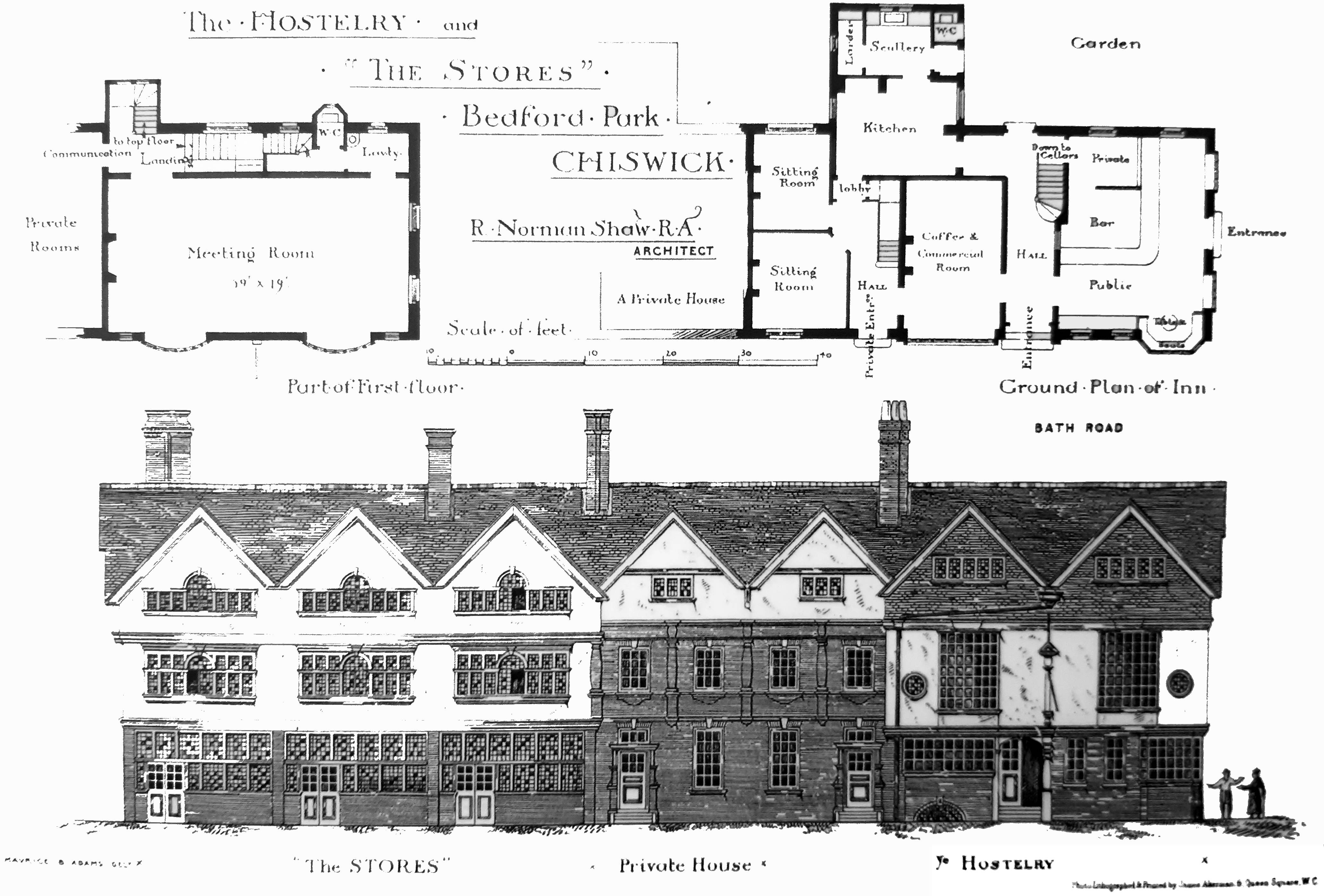
Plan for Bedford Park Stores and Hostelry 1880, drawn by Maurice Adams

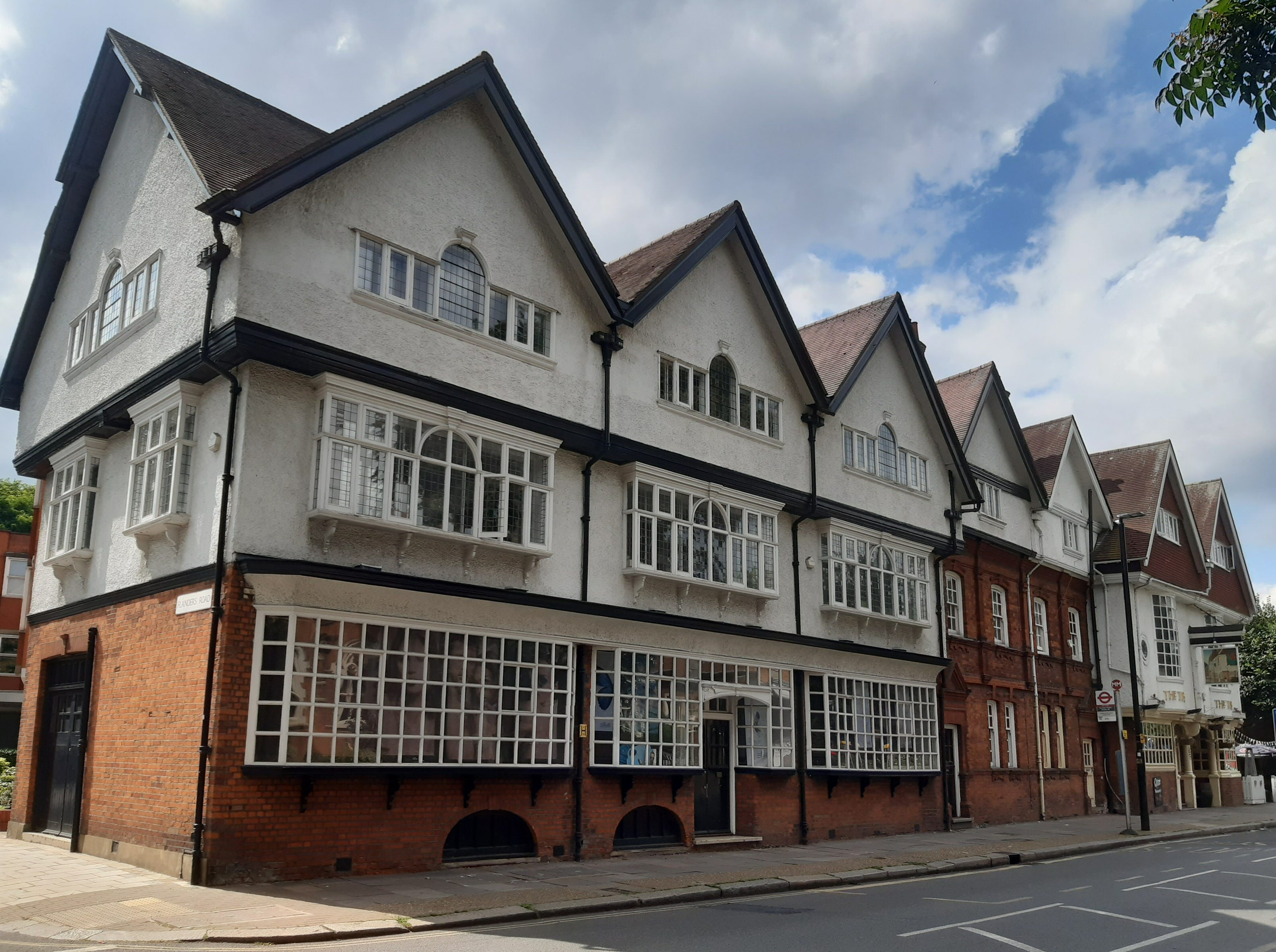
The estate shop, the Bedford Park Stores (with a private house and The Tabard), all by Shaw, 1880

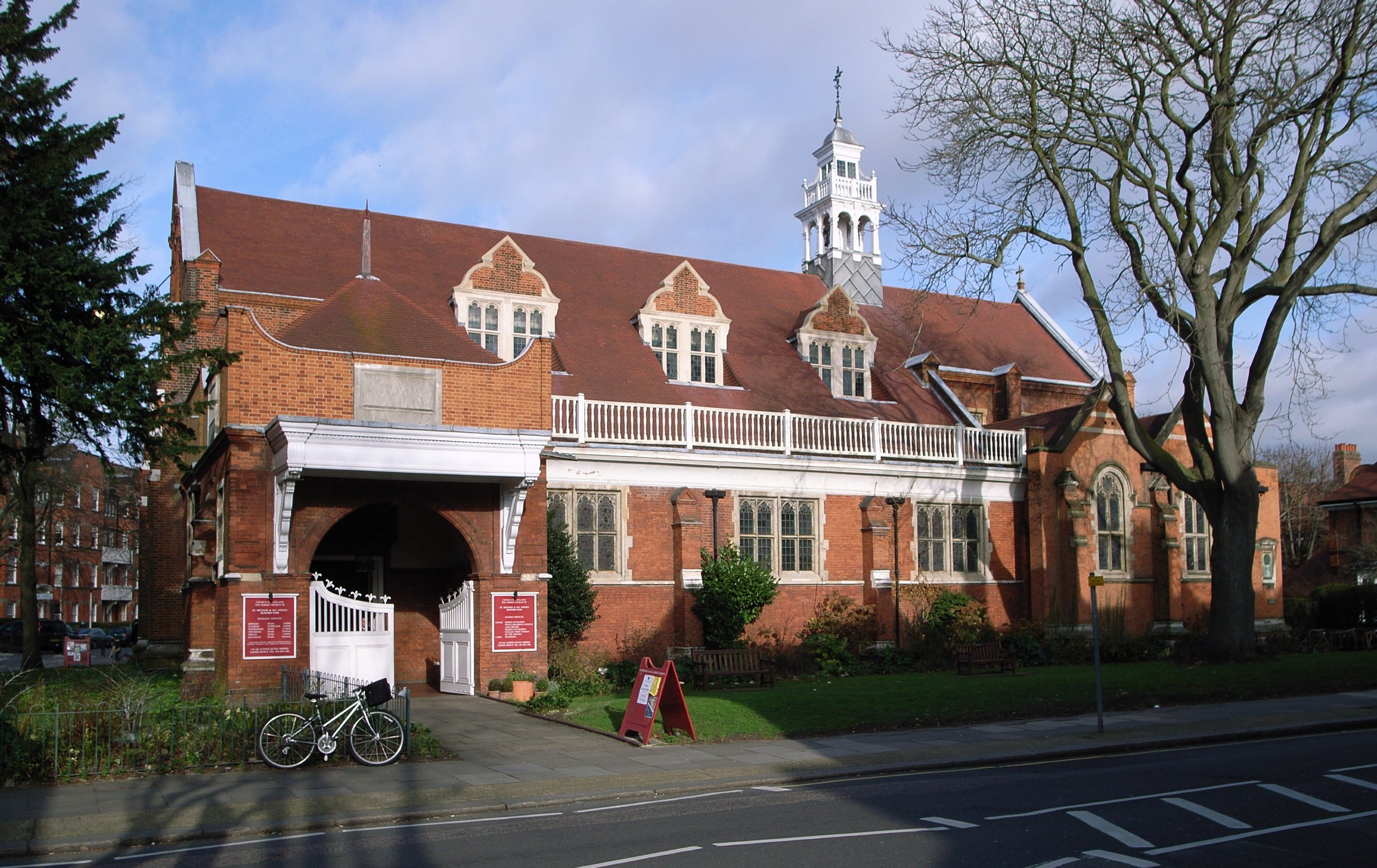
The estate church of St Michael and All Angels by Shaw, 1880

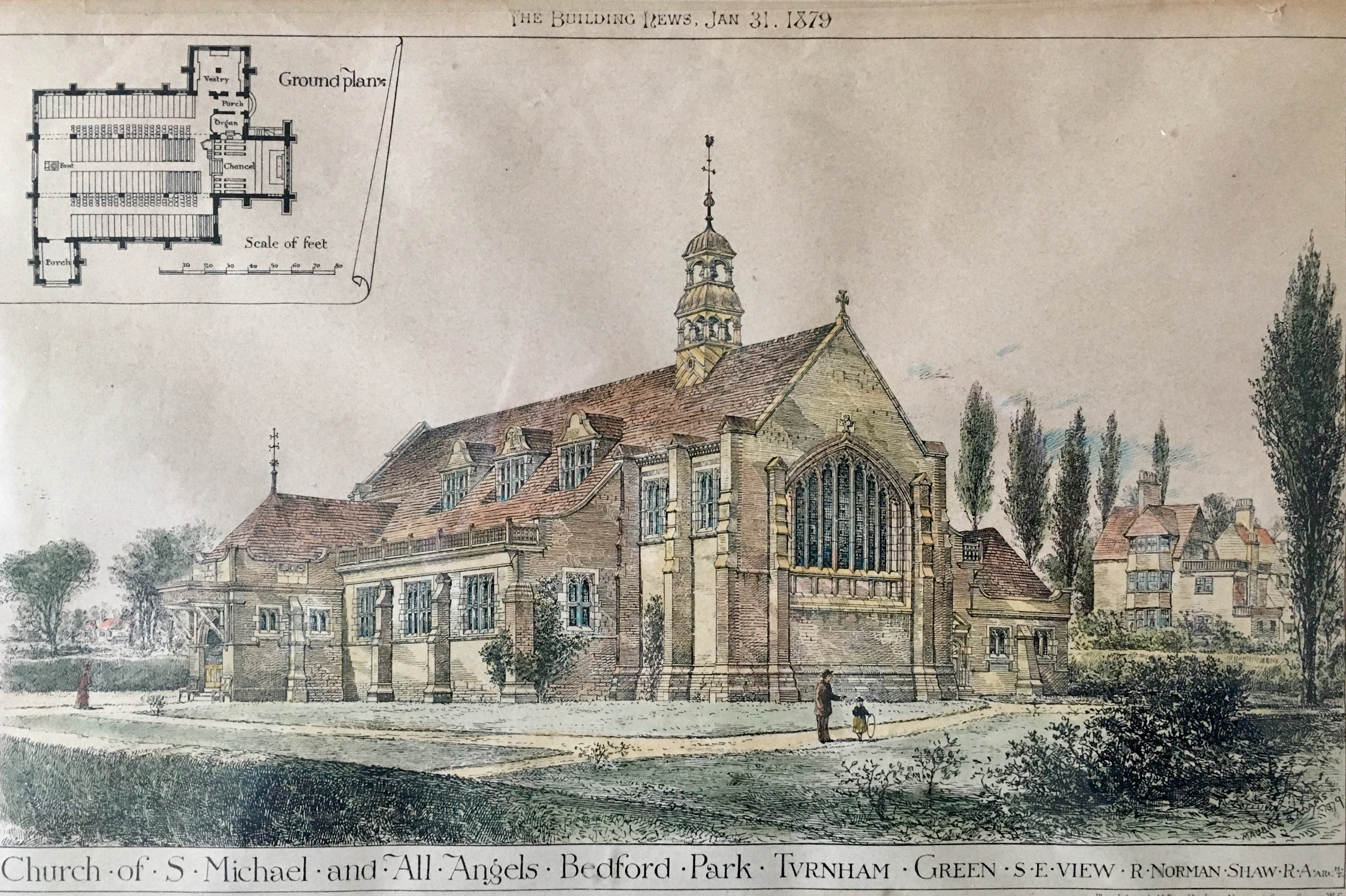
Shaw's St Michael and All Angels, drawn by Maurice Adams for Building News, 1879

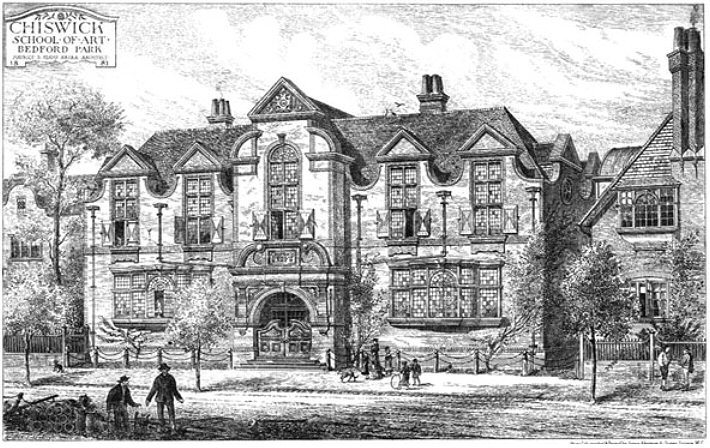
Design for Chiswick School of Art, Bath Road by Maurice Bingham Adams, 1881

=== Informality ===
A major feature of Bedford Park is its apparently informal plan. One suggestion is that this derived from a desire to protect the estate's fine trees, the smaller streets incorporating bends to allow the favoured mature trees to remain. This is denied by the local historian David Budworth, who writes that the roads followed plot boundaries, which were marked by trees, though he accepts that avoiding trees influenced the siting of some houses. The historian Stephen Inwood writes that the plan was to look unplanned, without squares, without formal crescents, and almost without right angles; the bending streets could be village lanes, just as the houses give the illusion of being country cottages. Budworth however traces the origins of the bends in each road, finding practical explanations: Woodstock Road takes its lines from the eastern edge of Carr's 24-acre purchase; a track, with bend, already existed by 1875; and the bends in Queen Anne's Gardens may, he writes, have been introduced to allow best use to be made of the trapezoidal area delineated by The Avenue, Blenheim Road, Woodstock Road, and Bedford Road.

The Bedford Park Gazette of July 1883 quoted a report from the Daily News to the effect that the estate's roads were made "with cunning carelessness to curve in such wise as never to leave the eye to stare at nothing... [The streets] form a succession of views as if the architect had taken a hint from Nature". Visitors admired the country feeling of the suburb, rather than the assemblage of buildings; the essayist Ian Fletcher comments that it was rus in urbe, the countryside in the city, noting that in the 1880s and '90s, nightingales were reported to sing in the gardens.

The informality attracted intellectuals and artists; some twenty houses incorporated studios for artists to work in. A result was a reputation for being aesthetic and arty.

A pleasantly informal place to live

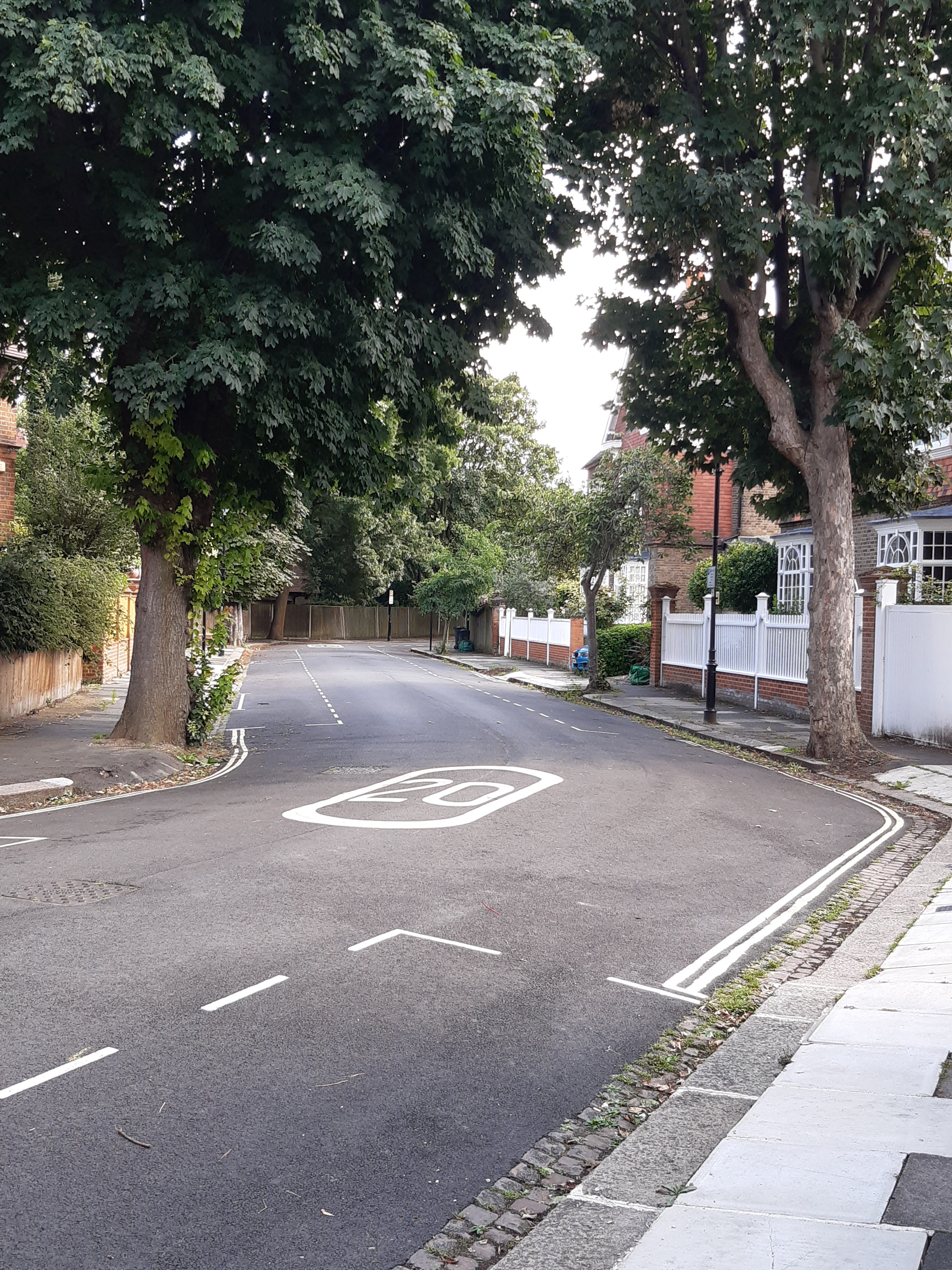
Double bend in Queen Anne's Gardens

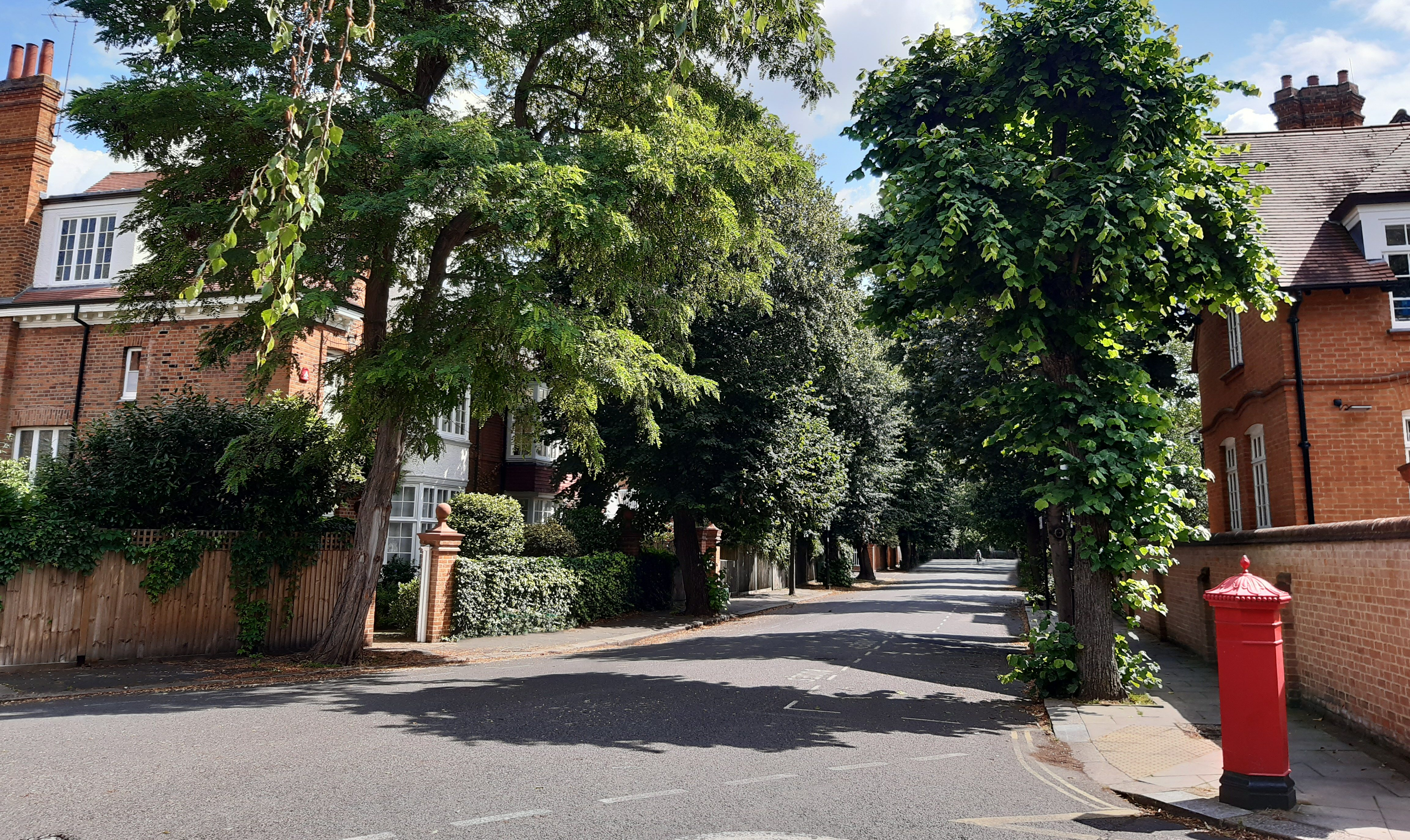
Bedford Park was by intention a pleasant leafy place to live. This view is on Bedford Road.

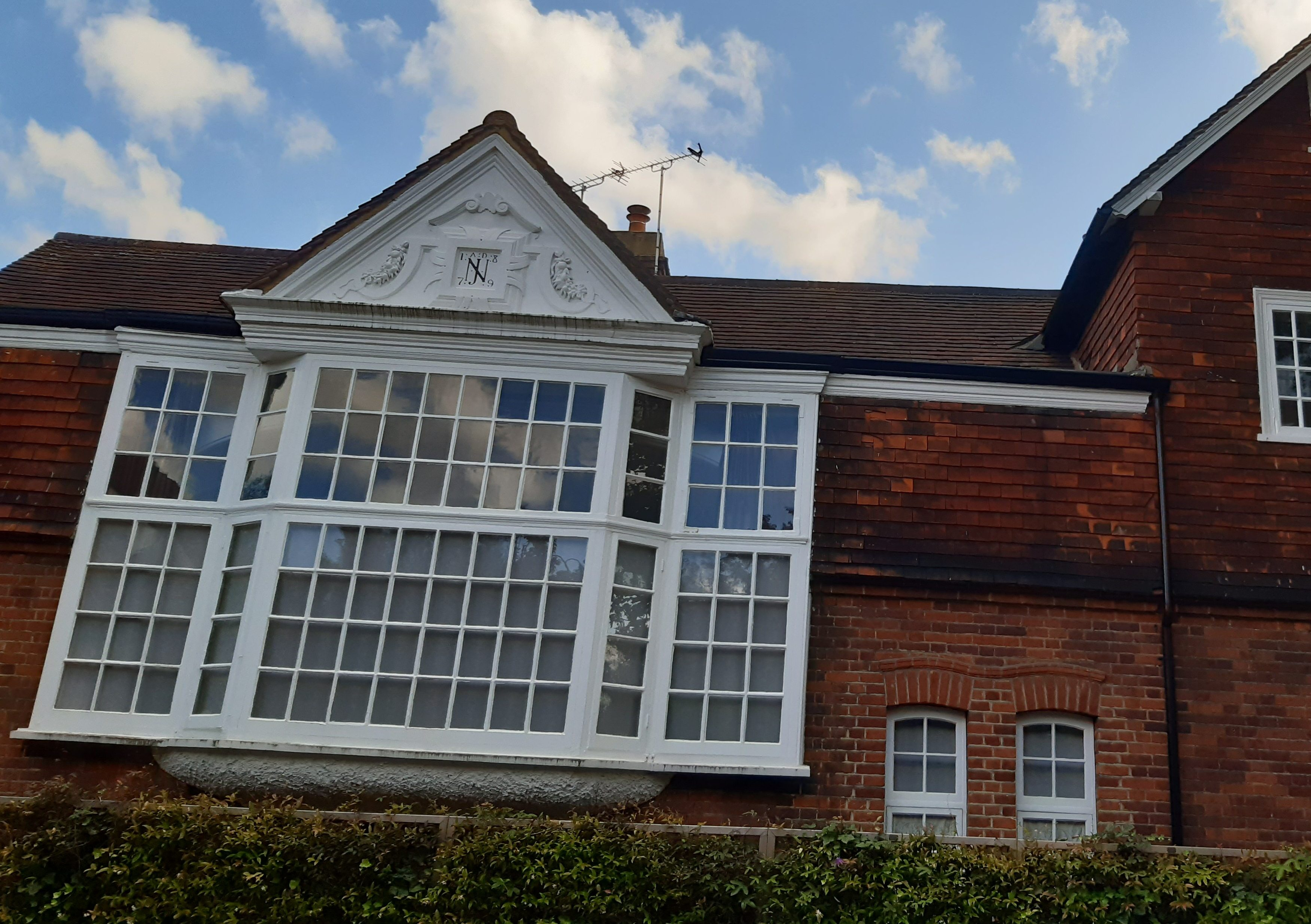
Joseph Nash Jr.'s studio with 1879 cartouche, Blenheim Road, on Norman Shaw corner house

=== Architecture ===
Many of the best-known architects of the Victorian era contributed buildings in a mixture of styles in Bedford Park; two of them, E. J. May and Maurice Adams, chose to live on the estate. Major architects involved in the early period of the creation of the estate included Edward William Godwin, Richard Norman Shaw, Edward John May, Henry Wilson, and Maurice Bingham Adams; later, a modernist building was contributed by C.F.A. Voysey, and another by Fritz Ruhemann and Michael Dugdale. Most of the houses are large, often detached or semi-detached, but there are some smaller terraced cottages, such as on Marlborough Crescent. Most, too, are in British Queen Anne Revival style, meaning a mix of English and Flemish house styles from the 17th and 18th centuries, but elements of many other styles are included in some of the houses. The streets, too, have names from the time of Queen Anne (1665–1714), as for instance Addison Grove for Joseph Addison (1672–1719), Newton Grove for Isaac Newton (1642–1726), Blenheim Road for the Battle of Blenheim (1704), Marlborough Crescent for the Duke of Marlborough, victor of that battle, Woodstock Road for the site of Marlborough's Blenheim Palace, and Queen Anne's Gardens for the monarch herself.

Characteristic features of the houses are red brick, walls hung with tiles, gables of varying shapes, balconies, bay windows, terracotta and rubbed brick decorations, pediments, elaborate chimneys, and balustrades painted white. The eclectic approach is well seen in the estate church of St Michael and All Angels, where Shaw has incorporated Arts & Crafts, Georgian, medieval, Tudor, and Wren styles.

A mixture of styles and sizes

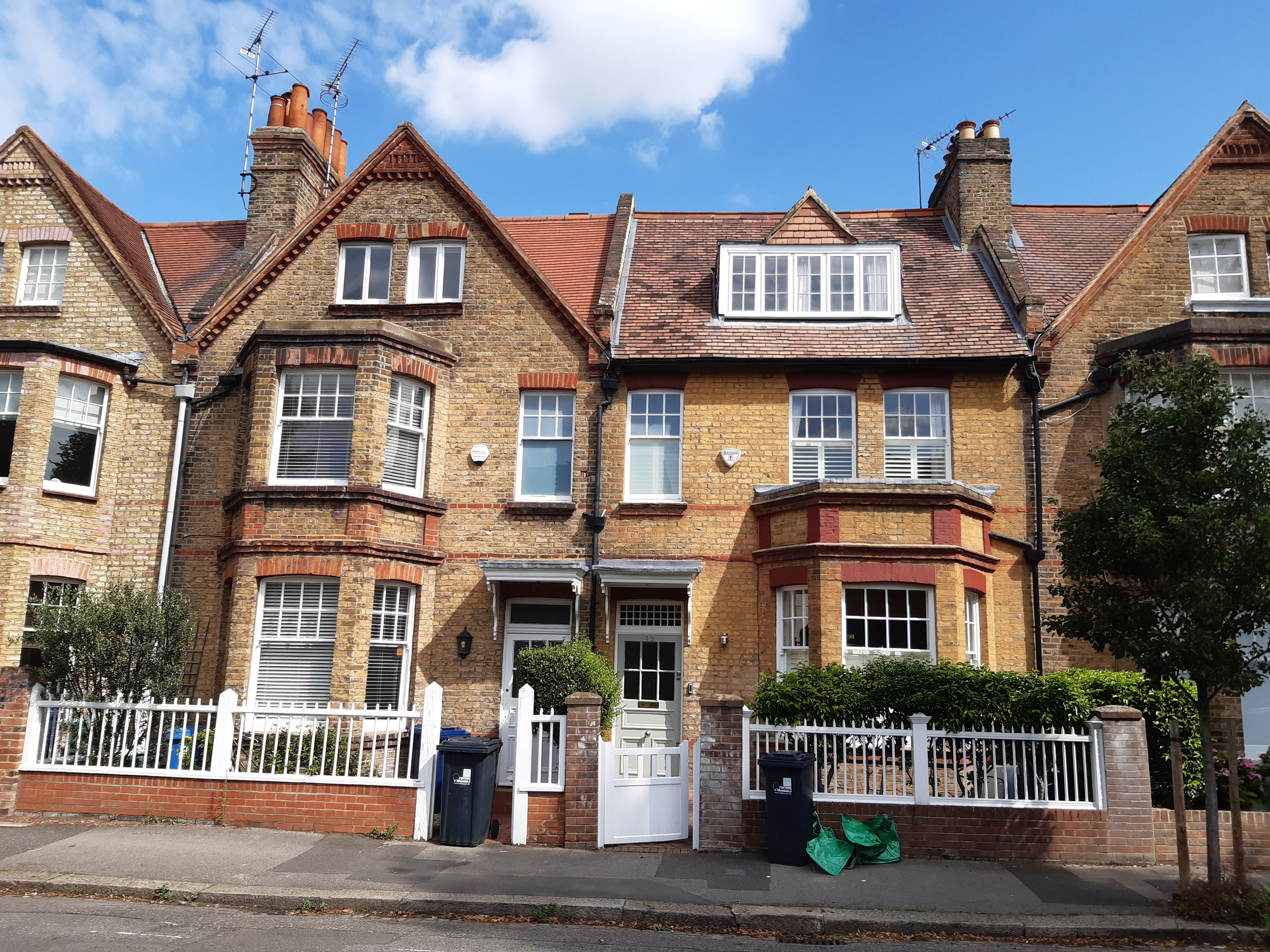
Smaller Bedford Park cottages, Marlborough Crescent

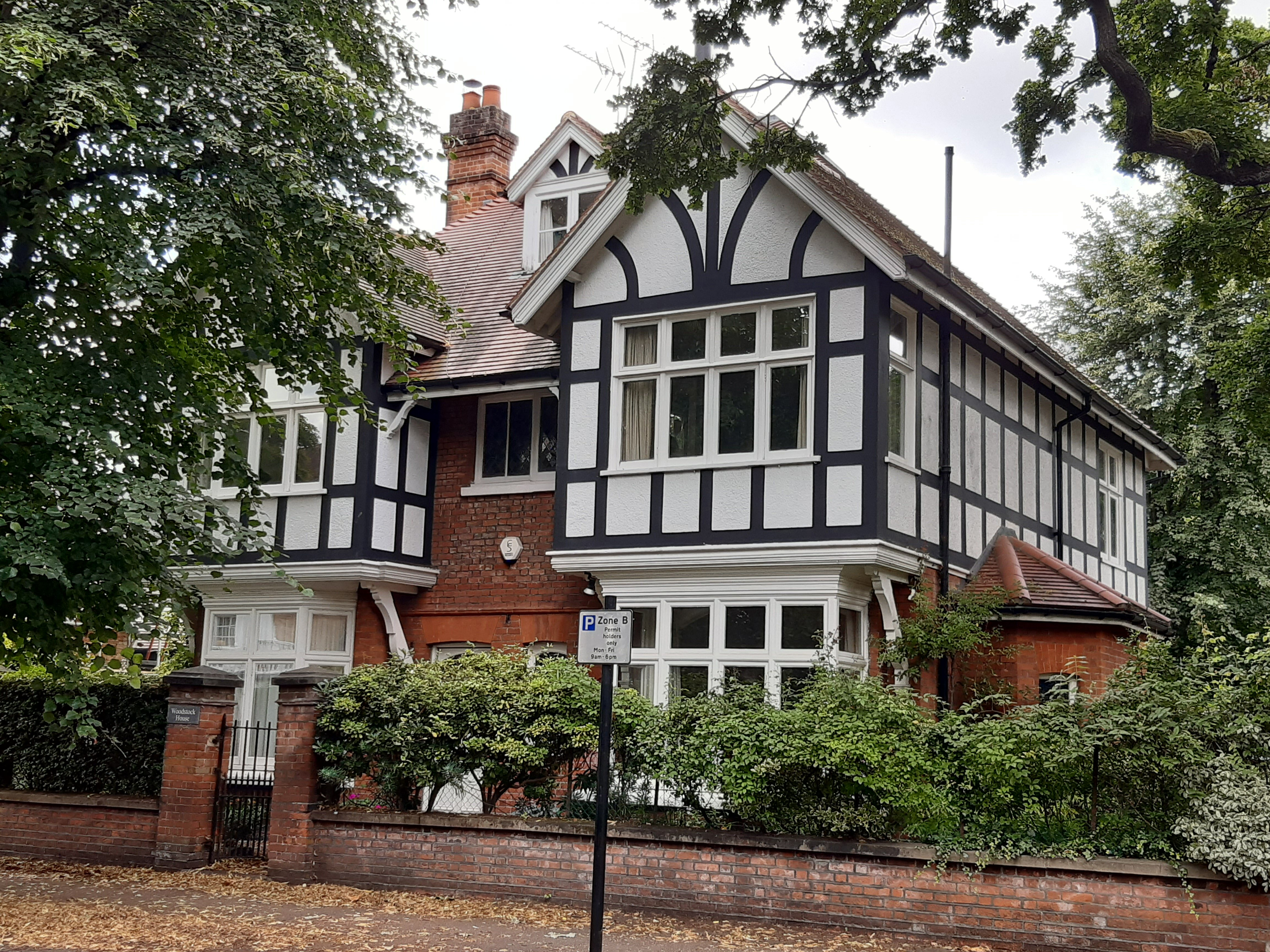
Mock Tudor style: Woodstock House, Woodstock Road

=== Industry ===
The area has always been residential, but in Flanders Road, near the railway line, the 1897 Bedford Park Works was home to a coachbuilder, H. J. Mulliner & Co.; the neighbouring Bedford Park Stores building was used as its showroom. The long-established firm increasingly specialised in coachwork for luxury Rolls-Royce and Bentley cars. It was taken over by Rolls-Royce in 1959; the site is occupied by an office block, Mulliner House.

=== Promotion ===
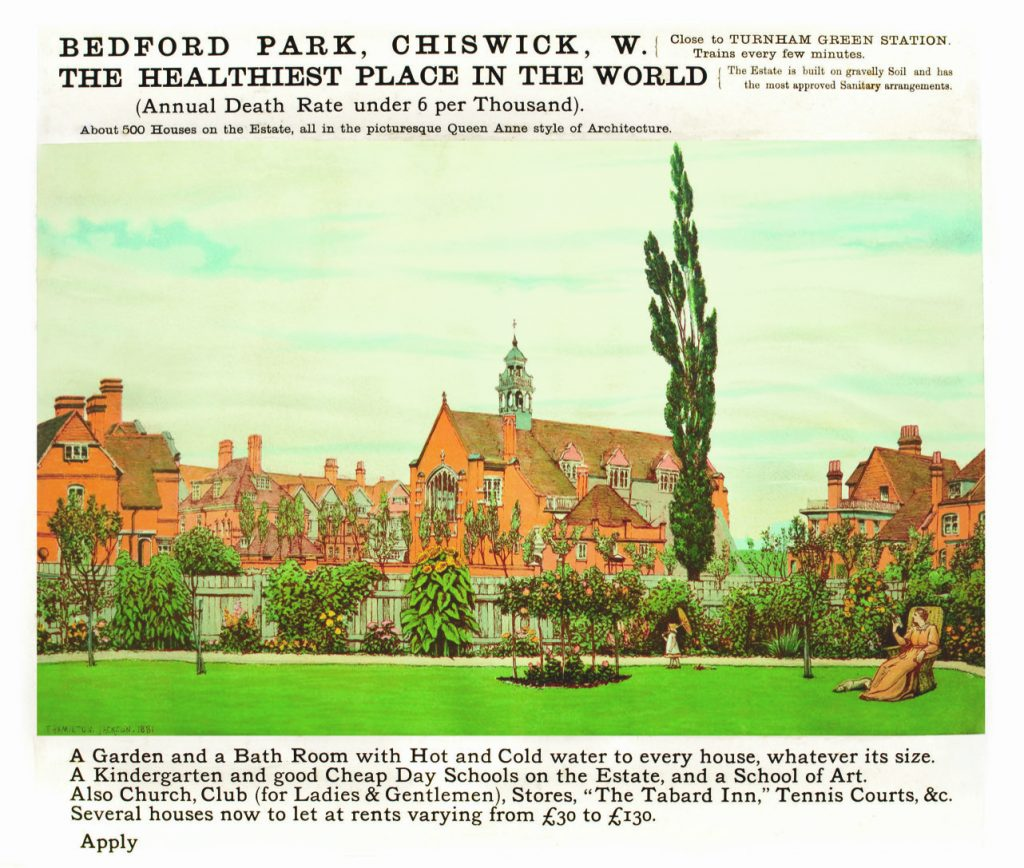
'Bedford Park, Chiswick, W. the Healthiest Place in the World': coloured lithograph by Frederick Hamilton Jackson, c. 1882

Carr commissioned the artist F. Hamilton Jackson to create a set of nine lithographs to publicise his Bedford Park development, including one, picturing St Michael and All Angels church, described as iconic, claiming that the suburb was "the healthiest place in the world". The development was promoted to people who had a moderate income but who had "aesthetic sensibilities". The promotion mentioned "A Garden and a Bath Room with Hot and Cold water to every house, whatever its size", and "A Kindergarten and good Cheap Day Schools on the Estate, and a School of Art. Also Church, Club (for Ladies & Gentlemen), Stores, 'The Tabard Inn', Tennis Courts, &c."

== Impact ==
=== Fashion ===
Living in Bedford Park, with its church, parish hall, club, shops, pub and school of art, became the height of fashion in the 1880s. W. B. Yeats, the actor William Terriss, the actress Florence Farr, the playwright Arthur Wing Pinero and painters including Camille Pissarro lived here. Pissarro made five paintings of the estate among his London works. Living there was felt to signify some connection with aestheticism. Nine painters (John Charles Dollman; Edward Hargitt; Thomas Erat Harrison; F. Hamilton Jackson; Joseph Nash, Jr.; Henry M. Paget; Thomas Rooke; Manfred Trautschold; Vincent Brooks; and Berry F. Berry) contributed works to an 1882 illustrated book, Bedford Park, celebrating the suburb. The artist Edmund Blair Leighton, too, was one of the first residents of Bedford Park, first in Queen Anne's Grove by 1881 and then Priory Road (now Priory Avenue) until 1922.

The suburb is Saffron Park in G. K. Chesterton's The Man Who Was Thursday and Biggleswick in John Buchan's Mr Standfast. The Man Who Was Thursday begins:

The suburb of Saffron Park lay on the sunset side of London, as red and ragged as a cloud of sunset. It was built of a bright brick throughout; its sky-line was fantastic, and even its ground plan was wild. It had been the outburst of a speculative builder, faintly tinged with art, who called its architecture sometimes Elizabethan and sometimes Queen Anne, apparently under the impression that the two sovereigns were identical. It was described with some justice as an artistic colony, though it never in any definable way produced any art. But although its pretensions to be an intellectual centre were a little vague, its pretensions to be a pleasant place were quite indisputable. The stranger who looked for the first time at the quaint red houses could only think how very oddly shaped the people must be who could fit in to them.

Fletcher wrote that Chesterton knew the suburb well, having met his future wife Frances Blogg there; his depiction of it was "somewhat fantastic, somewhat inaccurate", as he liked to dramatise people, but his depiction was one of many, portraying Bedford Park as "Arcadian, Aesthetic, Bohemian; as ... a romantic Socialist Co-operative". Its residents were "artists, poets, academics, journalists, actors" and educated professionals, all self-conscious and articulate.

Paintings of Bedford Park by local artists

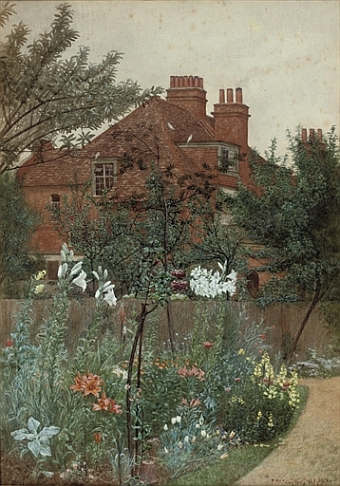
A garden in Queen Anne's Grove by Frederick Hamilton Jackson, 1882

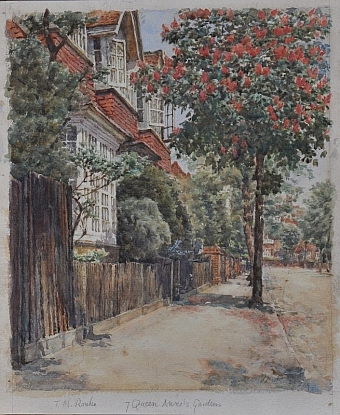
7 Queen Anne's Gardens
by T. M. Rooke, 1882
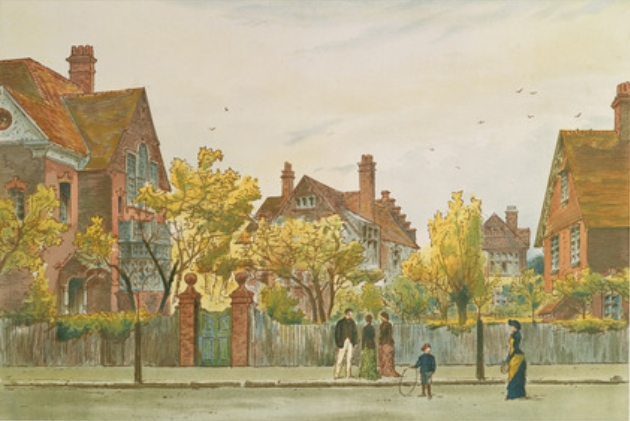
Newton Grove by Joseph Nash Jr, 1882

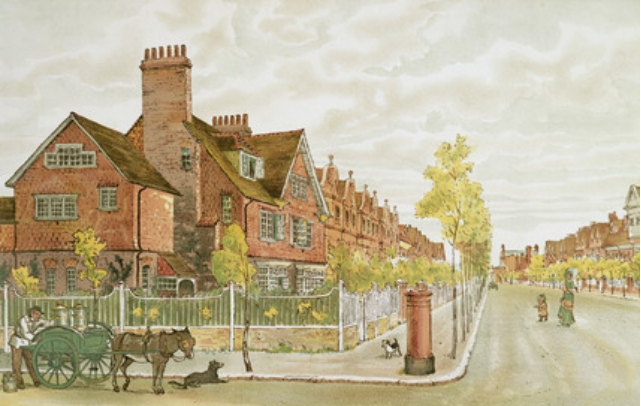
The Avenue by John Charles Dollman, 1882

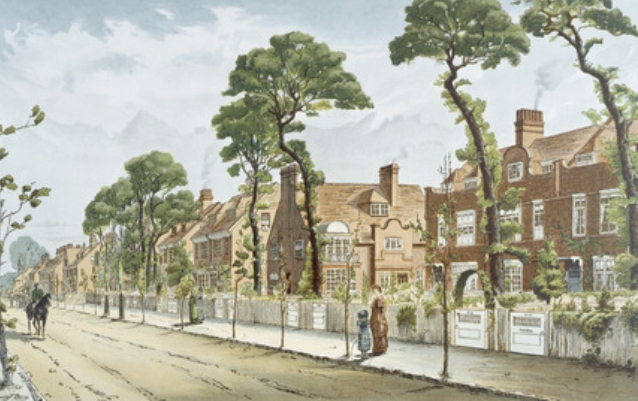
Bath Road looking east by Berry F. Berry, 1882

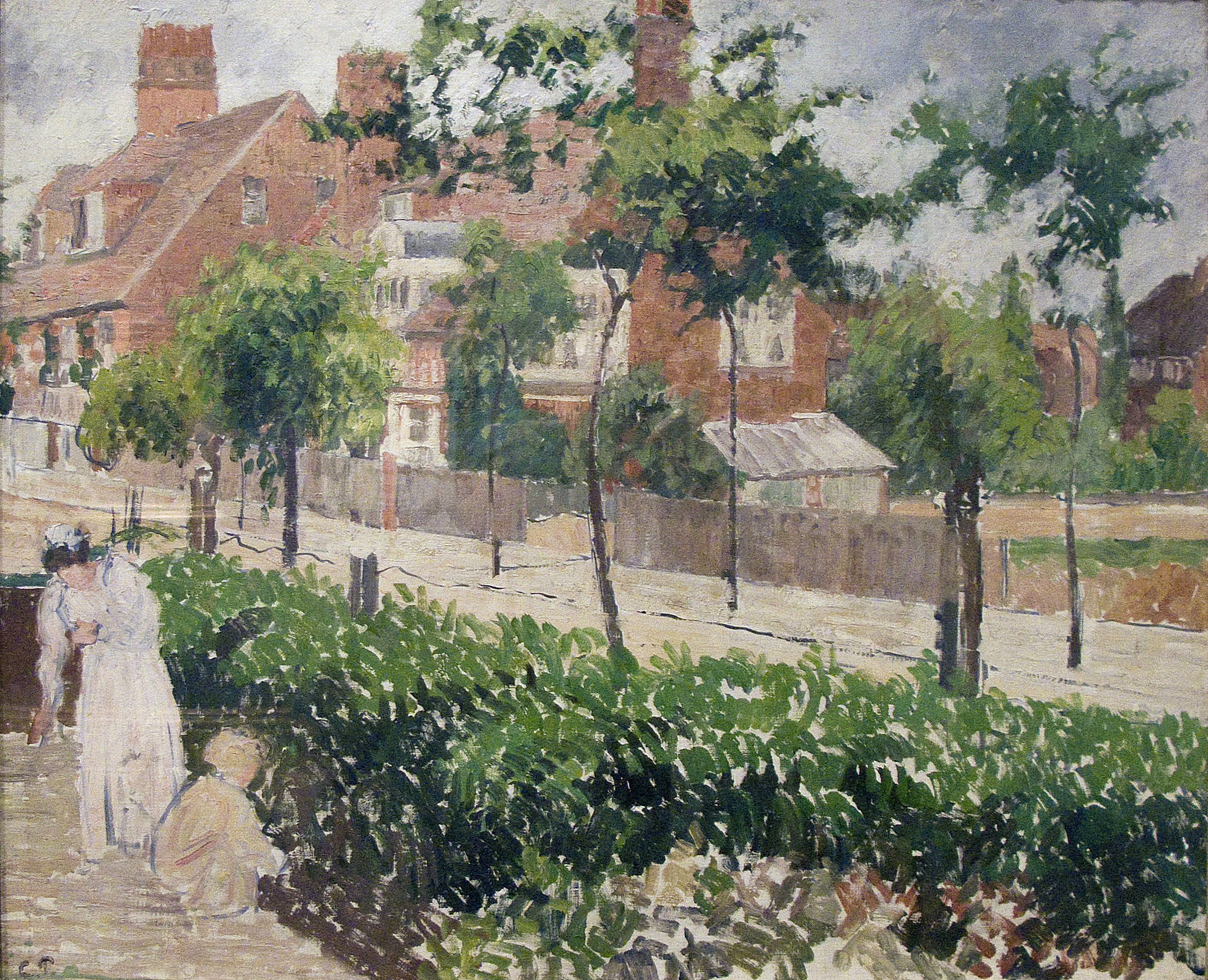
Bath Road, London by the Impressionist Camille Pissarro, 1897

So fashionable did the suburb become that Bedford Park came in for some gentle ribbing in the St James's Gazette of 17 December 1881 in the lengthy "Ballad of Bedford Park", with verses such as

Verses from the "Ballad of Bedford Park", 1881

'I will seek out a brighter spot',
continued Mr. Carr.
'Not too near London, and yet not
what might be called too far.'

'Tis there a village I'll erect
with Norman Shaw's assistance
Where men may lead a chaste correct
aesthetical existence.

Now he who loves aesthetic cheer
and does not mind the damp
May come and read Rossetti here
by a Japanesy lamp.

While 'Arry' shouts to 'Hemmua':
'say, 'ere's a bloomin' lark,
Them's the biled Lobster 'ouses
as folks call "Bedford Park".

Fletcher commented that the ballad "sounds like a malicious insider: dubious drains, Aestheticism, agnosticism, speculative building, are all present".

By 1888, the area's fashionability may have been declining; a piece by a Miss M. Nicolle in Oscar Wilde's The Woman's World magazine stated that "five or six years ago, Bedford Park was supposed to be the Mecca of Aestheticism... Much has happened since then. Bedford Park is no longer aesthetic (if indeed it ever was so) and the appreciation of Japanese art-wares has long ceased to be confined within its narrow bounds."

=== Significance ===
Audio description of Bedford Park by Peter Murray

Bedford Park has been described as the world's first garden suburb. Although it was not built in the co-operative manner like some later developments (Brentham Garden Suburb, Hampstead Garden Suburb), it created a model that was emulated not just by the Garden city movement, but by suburban developments around the world. Sir John Betjeman called Bedford Park "the most significant suburb built in the last century, probably in the western world". Herman Muthesius, the German author of the 1904 book The English House, commented that "It signifies neither more nor less than the starting point of the smaller modern house, which spread from there over the whole country". The historian of London Stephen Inwood writes that it "looks and feels like a true garden suburb, probably the best in London".

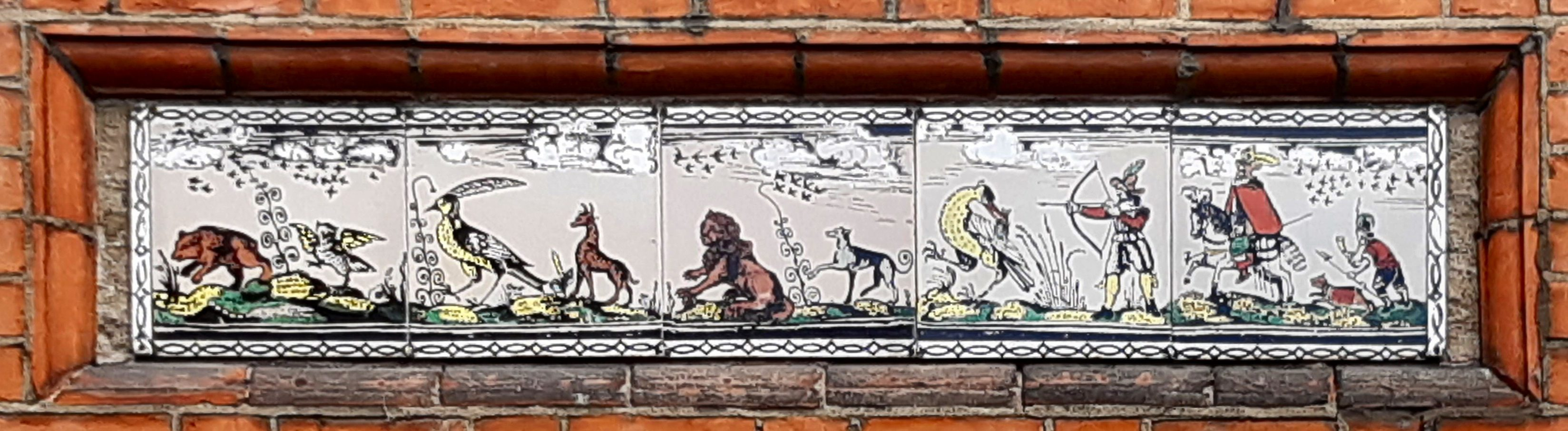
Art and life: fairytale tile decoration, Bedford Park

John J. Duffy, reviewing Ian Fletcher's essay "Bedford Park: Aesthete's Elysium?", calls Bedford Park "timidly self-conscious and physically ill-constructed", and "that imaginary museum in the London suburbs where inhabitants tried to break down the limits between art and life by time-travelling in the historically self-conscious architecture of their homes". He writes that Fletcher suggests that such a project would have required "a firmer base than a genteel Bohemianism and the omphalos of the District Railway linking it to time-conscious London".

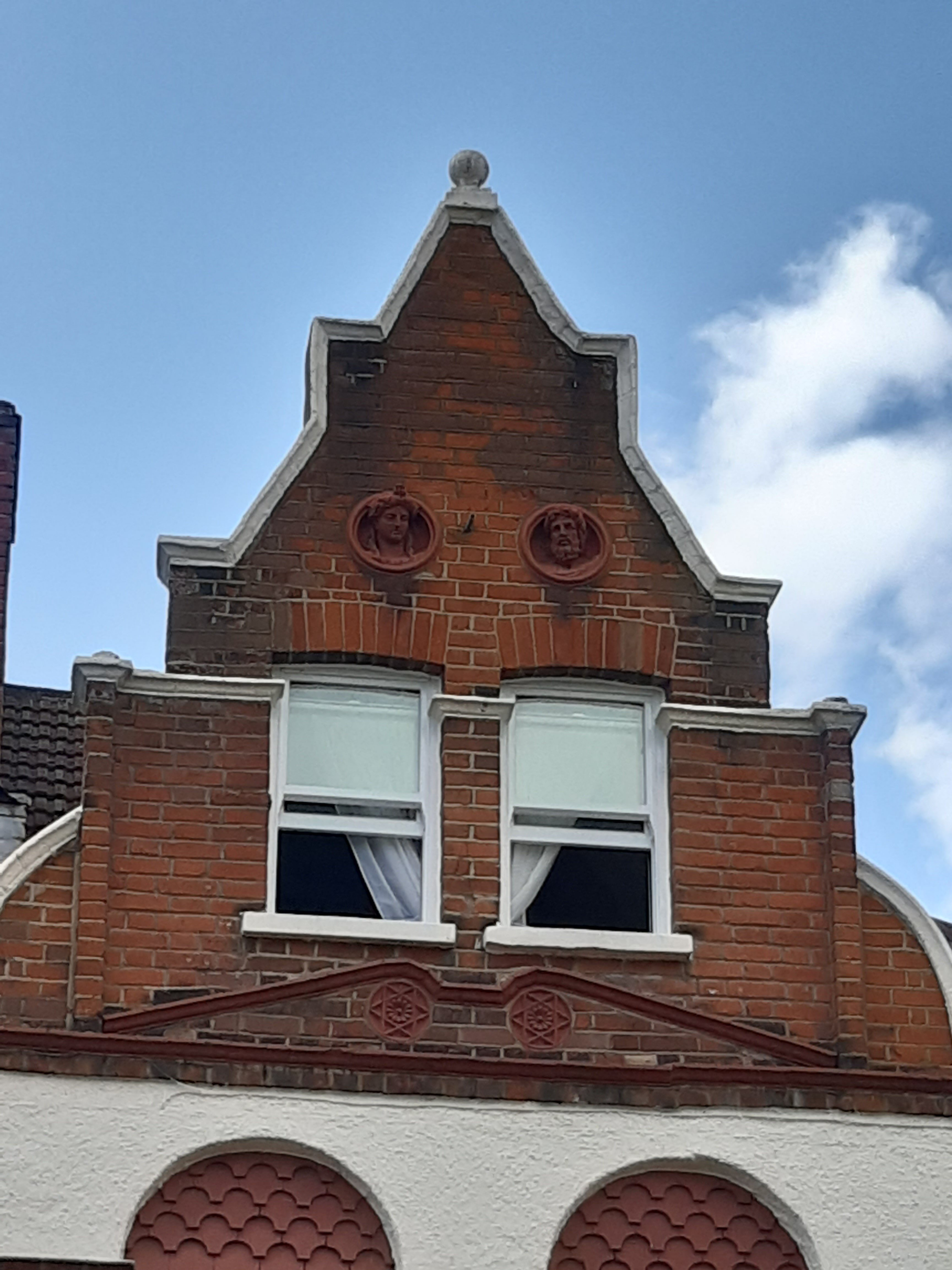
"Manufactured quaintness"? Dutch gable, terracotta roundels and sculptures, Bedford Park

Chesterton mocked the red-brick suburb with its "manufactured quaintness ... model cottages ... and arty-crafty shops", writing "Match me this marvel save where aesthetes are, A rose-red suburb half as old as Carr", a parody of a famous couplet from J. W. Burgon's 1845 poem Petra about an ancient Middle Eastern city: "Match me such marvel save in Eastern clime, A rose-red city half as old as time".

The popular press, like the architectural journals, admired the development. The Illustrated Sporting and Dramatic News commented in 1879 that "There is no attempt to conceal with false fronts, or stucco ornament or unmeaning balustrades ... everything is simple, honest, unpretending", and "There is an old-world air about the place despite its newness, a strong touch of Dutch homeliness, with an air of English comfort and luxuriousness, but not a bit of the showy, artificial French stuffs which prevailed in our homes when Queen Anne was on the throne".

=== Protection: The Bedford Park Society ===
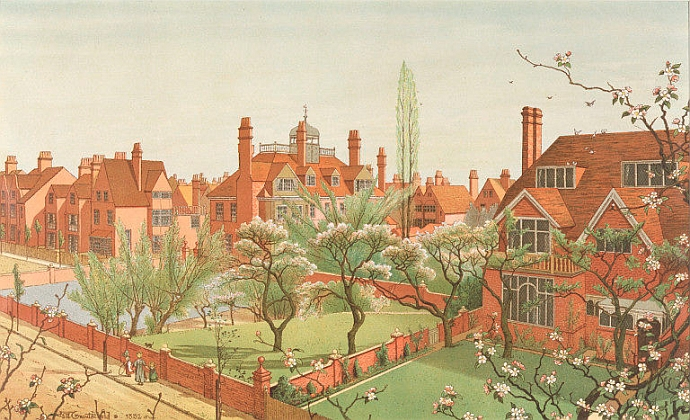
Painting of Tower House and Queen Anne's Grove by Manfred Trautschold, 1882. The house belonged to Carr, and was later demolished by developers.

Despite their creation by well-known architects, buildings in the suburb, especially the larger houses to the west with large gardens, have been demolished by developers to make way for blocks of flats. Among these was Carr's own property, Tower House on Bedford Road. Shaw designed it for him in 1878; it had 16 rooms, and its grounds were large enough to include both tennis and badminton courts. It served as St Catherine's Convent from 1908 to 1933, when it was replaced by St Catherine's Court.

The Bedford Park Society, a registered charity, was formed in 1963 by the local activist Harry Taylor and the architect Thomas Affleck Greeves. Their concerns were united by the demolition of another Shaw house, The Bramptons on Bedford Road, to make way for a flat-roofed old people's home. The poet John Betjeman, a founder of the Victorian Society, became its first patron.

A breakthrough for the society came in 1967 when 356 of Bedford Park's houses were individually Grade II listed; this unprecedented move was seen to be necessary to protect the suburb, as conservation areas did not then exist in Britain. In 1969, with the law updated, the London Borough of Ealing made Bedford Park a conservation area; in 1970, the London Borough of Hounslow followed suit for its part of the suburb.

=== Notable residents ===
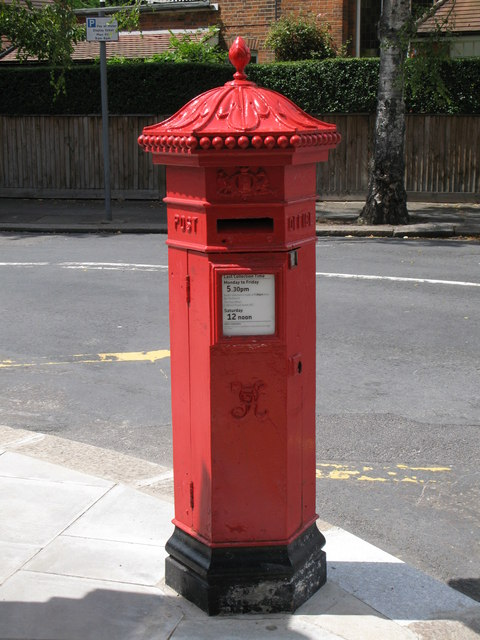
Penfold pillar box, c. 1879, The Orchard / Bedford Road

Before the estate was developed, John Lindley (1799–1865), botanist, lived at Bedford House, The Avenue, marked with a blue plaque.

Born in the 19th century

- Hubert Willis (1862–1933), silent film actor, lived at 39 Marlborough Crescent.
- W. B. Yeats (1865–1939), poet, and his brother Jack Butler Yeats lived at 3 Blenheim Road, marked with a Bedford Park Society plaque.
- Sir Sydney Cockerell (1867–1962), Fitzwilliam Museum curator, arts collector, lived at 51 Woodstock Road, 5 Priory Gardens, and 3 Fairfax Road.
- Harold Hume Piffard (1867–1939), artist, illustrator, and early aviator, lived at 18 Addison Road.
- Cecil Aldin (1870–1935), animal painter, lived at 47 Priory Avenue (then numbered 41).
- Karl Parsons (1884–1934), stained glass artist, lived at 38 Gainsborough Road.

Born in the 20th century

- Jo Grimond (1913–1993), Liberal politician, lived at 24 Priory Avenue.
- Alec Dickson (1914–1994) and his wife Mora, who founded Voluntary Service Overseas and Community Service Volunteers, lived at 19 Blenheim Road, marked by a Bedford Park Society plaque.
- Michael Flanders (1922–1975), entertainer, lived at 63 Esmond Road, marked by an Ealing Civic Society green plaque.
- Blake Butler (1924–1981), actor, lived at 33 Bath Road.
- Richard Briers (1934–2013), sitcom actor, lived and died at 6 The Orchard.
- Fenja Anderson (1941–2020) of 33 Abinger Road painted four watercolours of Bedford Park streets; these now hang in St Michael and All Angels Church.
