= Bruce Angrave =

English illustrator and poster artist (1912–1983)

Bruce Angrave (6 December 1912 – 8 July 1983) was an English illustrator and poster artist. He designed many posters for the large railway companies, as well as posters and cartoons for the Ministry of Information during World War II.

== Early life ==
Angrave was born on 6 December 1912, in Leicester, England, son of graphic designer and photographer Charles F. Angrave and Elsie, née Letts, living in Westcotes. He was a cousin of Trafford Smith, Governor of Malta. His father was a lithograph artist and he was educated by Austin Cooper at Reimann School of Art and Design. He also studied at the Chiswick School of Art in Bedford Park and the Central School of Art and Design, London. As well as Cooper, Angrave took influence from Tom Eckersley, Lewitt-Him and Abram Games.

== Biography ==
Angrave was commissioned by the main railway companies to create posters in the 1930s, as well as British Railways in the 1950s. Dr Bex Lewis explains that "[Angrave] believed that a poster should be approved or discarded within two seconds, and disapproved of the 'conference table' method." Around this time he was working at the London Press Exchange, where he would remain until the Second World War, where he would draw cartoons and design posters for the Ministry of Information. Angrave was a member of the Society of Industrial Artists and Art and Industry described Angrave's work as "clear, uncluttered line, reduced everything to the simplest possible terms, and invests his work with gaiety and derisive wit that is unmistakable".

After the war, Angrave held an exhibition of his work, including drawings he had produced for various books and journals, as well as sculptures in paper and wood and his many posters. The exhibition ran from 9–23 May 1946 at Foyles book store in London. Bruce Angrave also contributed cat-based cartoons for many years to the UK magazine Woman. These cartoons were always cat based and a skit/pun on some feline aspect. For example, Claw-dius was accompanied by a drawing of a cat wearing a toga. The cartoons were published as selected works in three books:

- Cat-alogue. William Collins Sons and Co Ltd. 1976. ISBN 0004103254.
- Magnifi-cat. William Collins Sons and Co Ltd. 1977. ISBN 0004103270.
- Tripli-cat. William Collins Sons and Co Ltd. 1978. ISBN 0004103343.

Angrave died on 8 July 1983.

== Legacy ==
One of his posters, advertising "Newquay: Cornwall's finest Atlantic resort" for the Great Western Railway sold for £3,000 in New York in 2014. It was believed that the poster had been created in 1932, when Angrave was still a teenager.

His work was displayed in the Henry Moore Institute Galleries in 2016 "The Body Extended: Sculpture and Prosthetics" exhibition. He was a member of the Society of Industrial Artists.
