= Maurice Bingham Adams =

British architect (1849–1933)

Maurice Adams

Maurice Bingham Adams FRIBA (1849–1933) was a British architect in the Arts and Crafts style.

== Life ==
Adams was born in 1849 and educated in Lewes, Sussex, England. After completing his articles as an apprentice architect, he worked as an assistant to Sir William Emerson and commenced independent practice in 1873. He was awarded ARIBA in 1876 and FRIBA in 1886. His wife was Emily (died 1927) and their marriage lasted 60 years: they had one son and six daughters. He retired in 1923 and died on 17 August 1933 in Brentford, Middlesex.

== Work ==
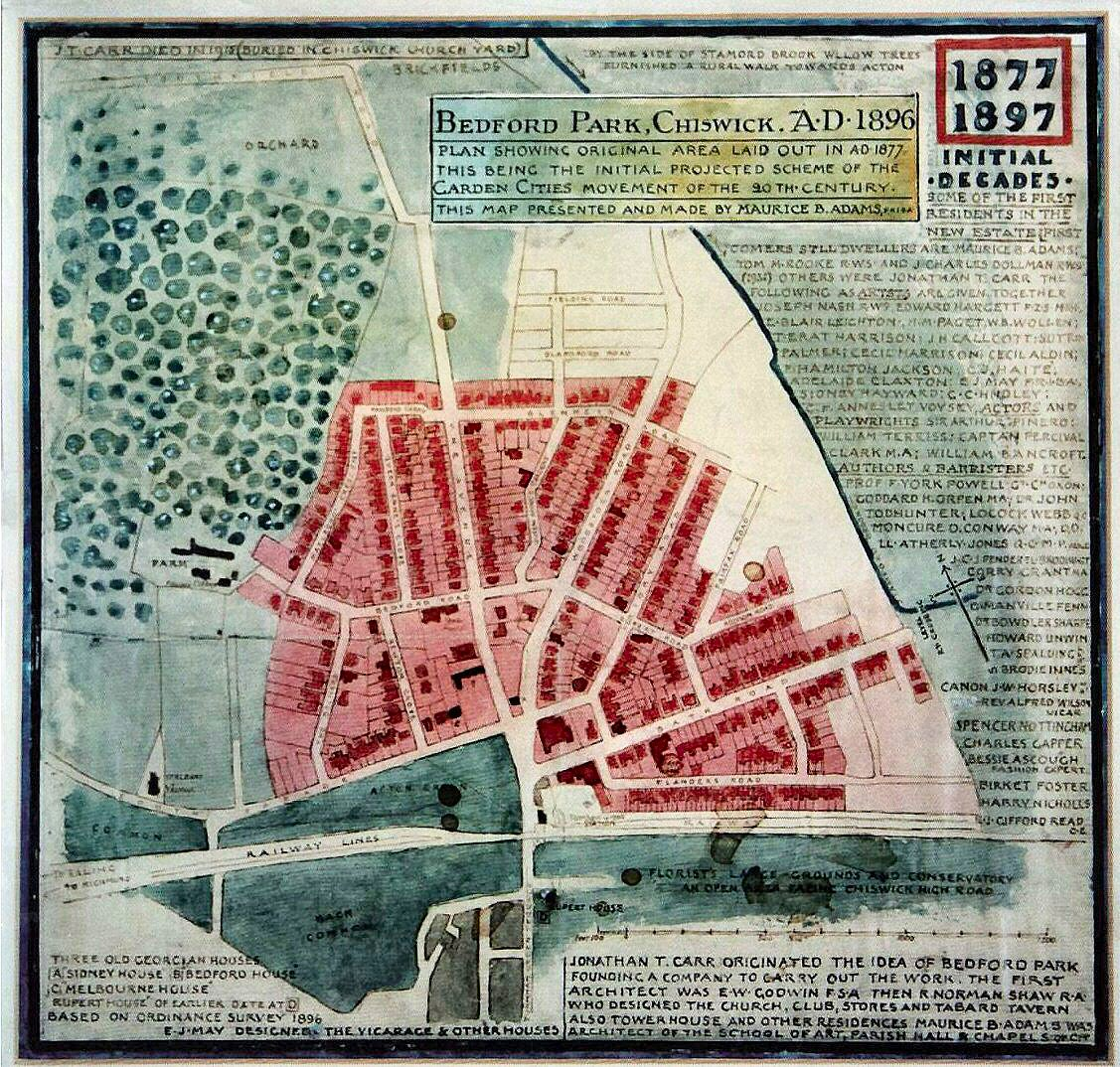
Adams map of Bedford Park, 1897

He was Architect to Brighton Council and from 1872 till his retirement was editor of the weekly Building News, whose owner John Passmore Edwards also commissioned him for many buildings, notably in the Bedford Park garden suburb, designing several houses there and completing St Michael and All Angels. In 1878 he moved to Bedford Park, and was one of the first two churchwardens of St Michael and All Angels. He was a prolific architect of public libraries. Other work included Camberwell Polytechnic and Art Gallery and country houses in England, Australia and the USA. He published several books including Artists' Homes (1883) and Modern Cottage Architecture (1904).

== Buildings ==
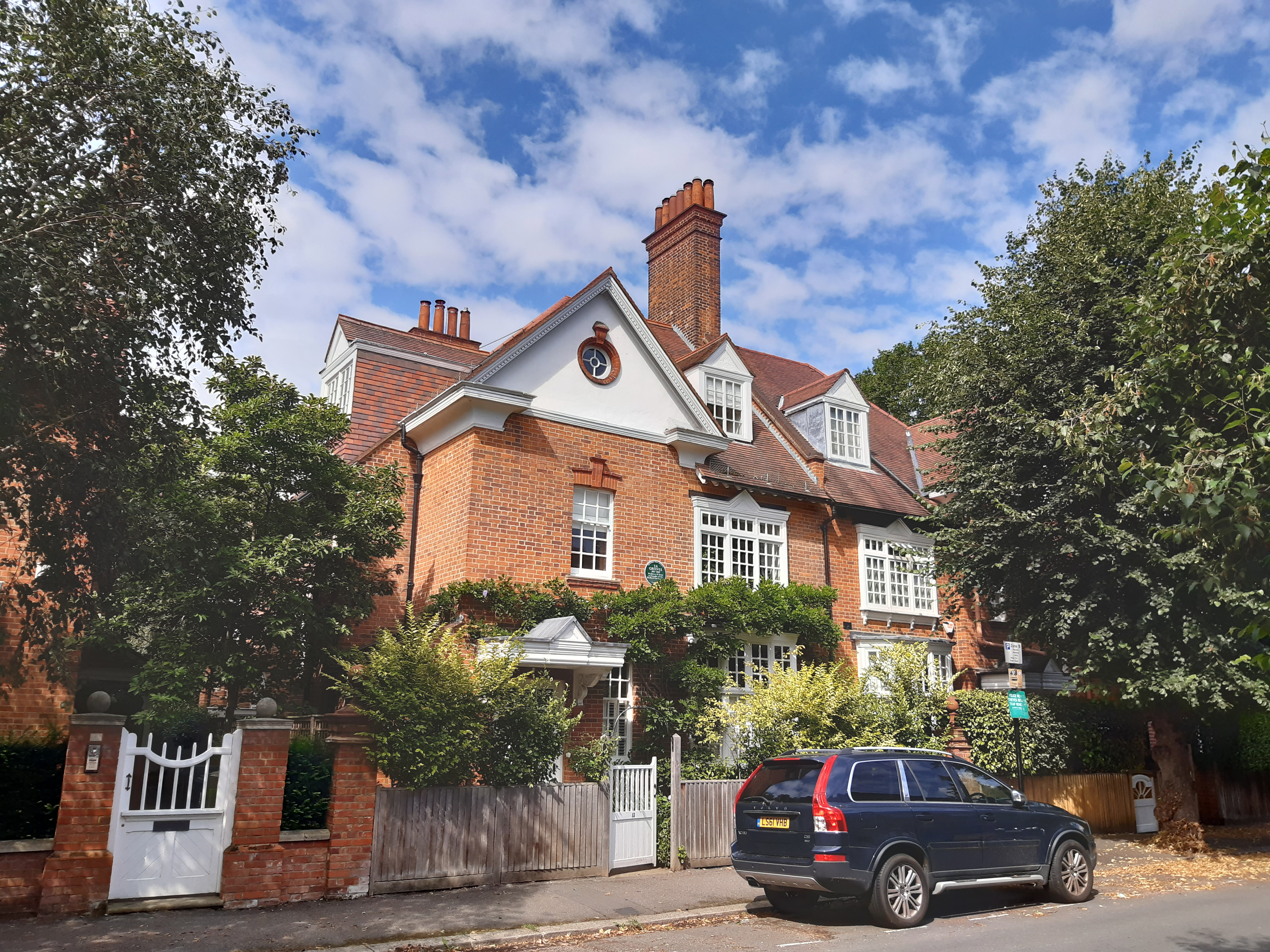
Adams houses on Newton Grove for John Charles Dollman, 1880

- Passmore Edwards Public Library, Shepherd's Bush
- Passmore Edwards Public Library, Acton
- Passmore Edwards Library, Burgess Park, Camberwell
- Isolation Home, Chalfont St. Peter, Buckinghamshire
- Frederick Greene Home, Chalfont St. Peter, Buckinghamshire
- Lord Leighton Memorial, Camberwell
- Central Library, Hammersmith,
- Passmore Edwards Polytechnic, Camberwell
- 12 and 14 Newton Grove, 5 Priory Avenue, Bedford Park
