= Thomas Erat Harrison =

English artist (1858–1917)

Thomas Erat Harrison (1858–1917) was an English artist who made sculptures, medals, paintings, and stained glass.

== Biography ==
Harrison was born in St John's Wood, London; his father was a builder. He was active between 1885 and 1910. He exhibited at the Arts and Crafts Exhibition Society, at the Annual Autumn Exhibition of Modern Pictures in Oil and Water Colour, and Architectural Designs at Nottingham Castle Museum, and at the Art Workers Guild. Among his works are streetscapes and portraits.

He contributed a painting to an 1882 book Bedford Park, celebrating the then-fashionable garden suburb of that name.

He made stained glass for churches such as the Church of St John the Baptist, Newport. He made a set of 12 stained glass windows for Betteshanger House in Kent, based on Edmund Spenser's The Faerie Queene; the windows depict the months of the year with their signs of the zodiac.

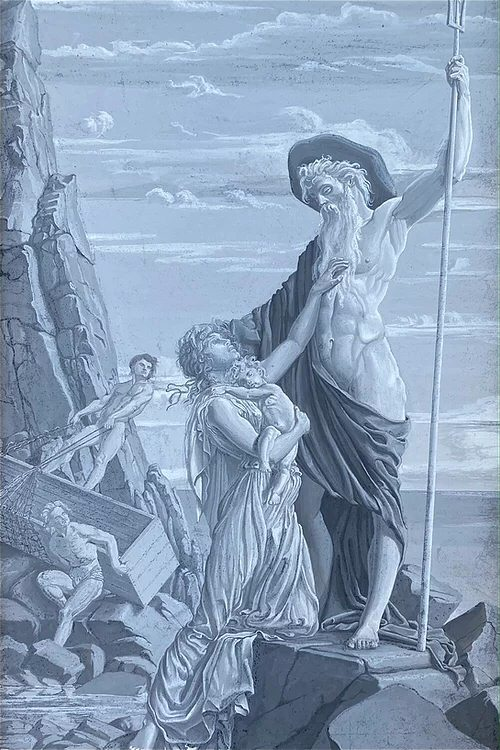
Dictys discovers Danae & the infant Perseus, gouache with wash and black chalk, 1880

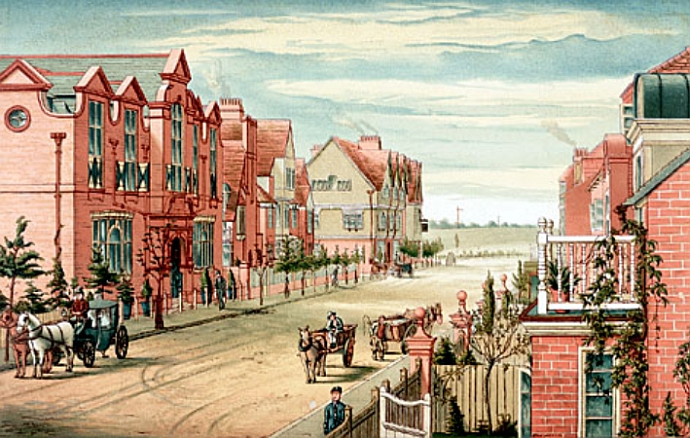
School of Art, Stores and Tabard Inn, 1882

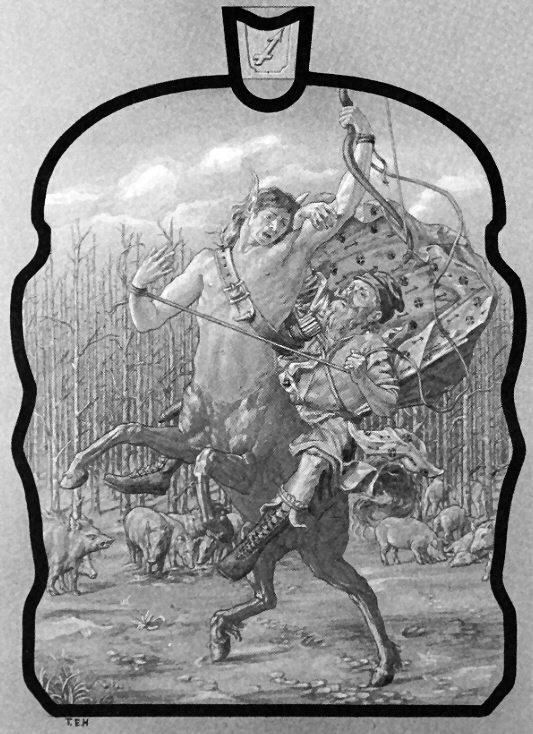
'November Astride the Centaur' drawing for stained glass at Betteshanger House, Kent, 1880s, alluding to Sagittarius and The Faerie Queene
