= Manfred Trautschold =

German genre painter and lithographer

Adolf Manfred Trautschold
- Born: March 27, 1854; Giessen, Germany
- Died: December 13, 1921 (aged 67); Queens, New York City, U.S.
- Occupations: Painter, lithographer
- Notable work: Bedford Park (1882)
- Movement: Genre painting
- Spouse: Marguerite De Hees
- Children: 2 (Reginald William Trautschold, Gordon Manfred Trautschold)
- Relatives: Wilhelm Trautschold (father), Hermann Trautschold (uncle), Sophia Johnston (mother), James Muspratt (grandfather)

Adolf Manfred Trautschold (27 March 1854 – 13 December 1921) was a German genre painter and lithographer. He worked in England and then in New Jersey.

== Biography ==
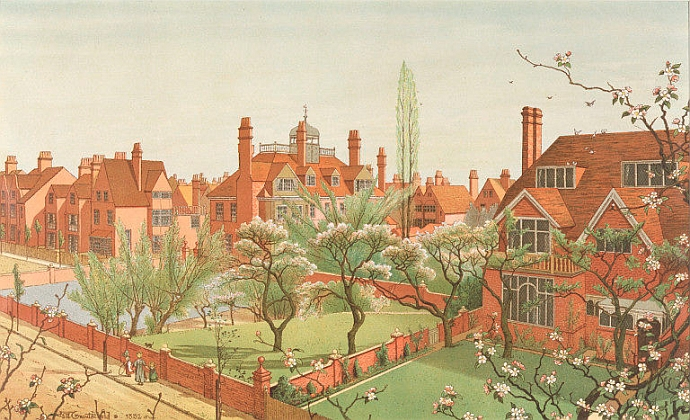
Tower House and Queen Anne's Grove, Bedford Park, 1882.

Adolf Manfred Trautschold was born in Giessen, Germany to Wilhelm Trautschold and his British wife Sophia Johnston, an illegitimate daughter of the industrial chemist James Muspratt. His uncle was the palaeontologist Hermann Trautschold. Little is known of his training in art. He married the Belgian Marguerite De Hees, daughter of a merchant, in Dover, Kent on 22 August 1878. They had two sons, Reginald William Trautschold and Gordon Manfred Trautschold. He contributed a painting to an 1882 book Bedford Park, celebrating the then-fashionable garden suburb of that name. In 1887 the family emigrated to the US, settling in Montclair, New Jersey. The family home became known as an artists' colony.

He died in Queens, New York City.
