= Architecture of Bedford Park =

Architectural design of a West London suburb

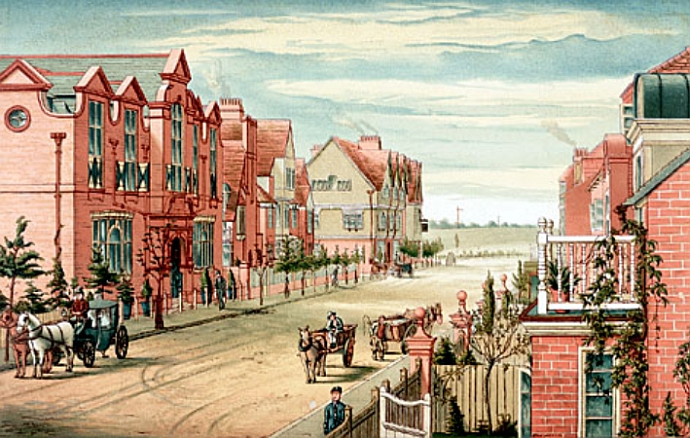
Painting of Bedford Park's Chiswick School of Art, Stores and Tabard Inn, with a large house on the right, by Thomas Erat Harrison, 1882

The architecture of Bedford Park in Chiswick, West London, is characterised largely by Queen Anne Revival style, meaning an eclectic mixture of English and Flemish house styles from the 17th and 18th centuries, with elements of many other styles featuring in some of the buildings.

As well as domestic buildings, the Bedford Park estate has a group of public buildings, namely its church, St Michael and All Angels; a social club, now the London Buddhist Vihara; its inn, The Tabard, and next door its shop, the Bedford Park Stores; and its art school, now replaced by the Arts Educational Schools.

The garden suburb was created from 1875 over a period of some 20 years, its development by Jonathan Carr prompted by the arrival of the District Line at Turnham Green Station.

Major architects involved in the early period of the creation of the estate included Edward William Godwin, Richard Norman Shaw, Edward John May, Henry Wilson, and Maurice Bingham Adams; later, a modernist building was contributed by C.F.A. Voysey, and another by Fritz Ruhemann and Michael Dugdale.

== Historical context ==
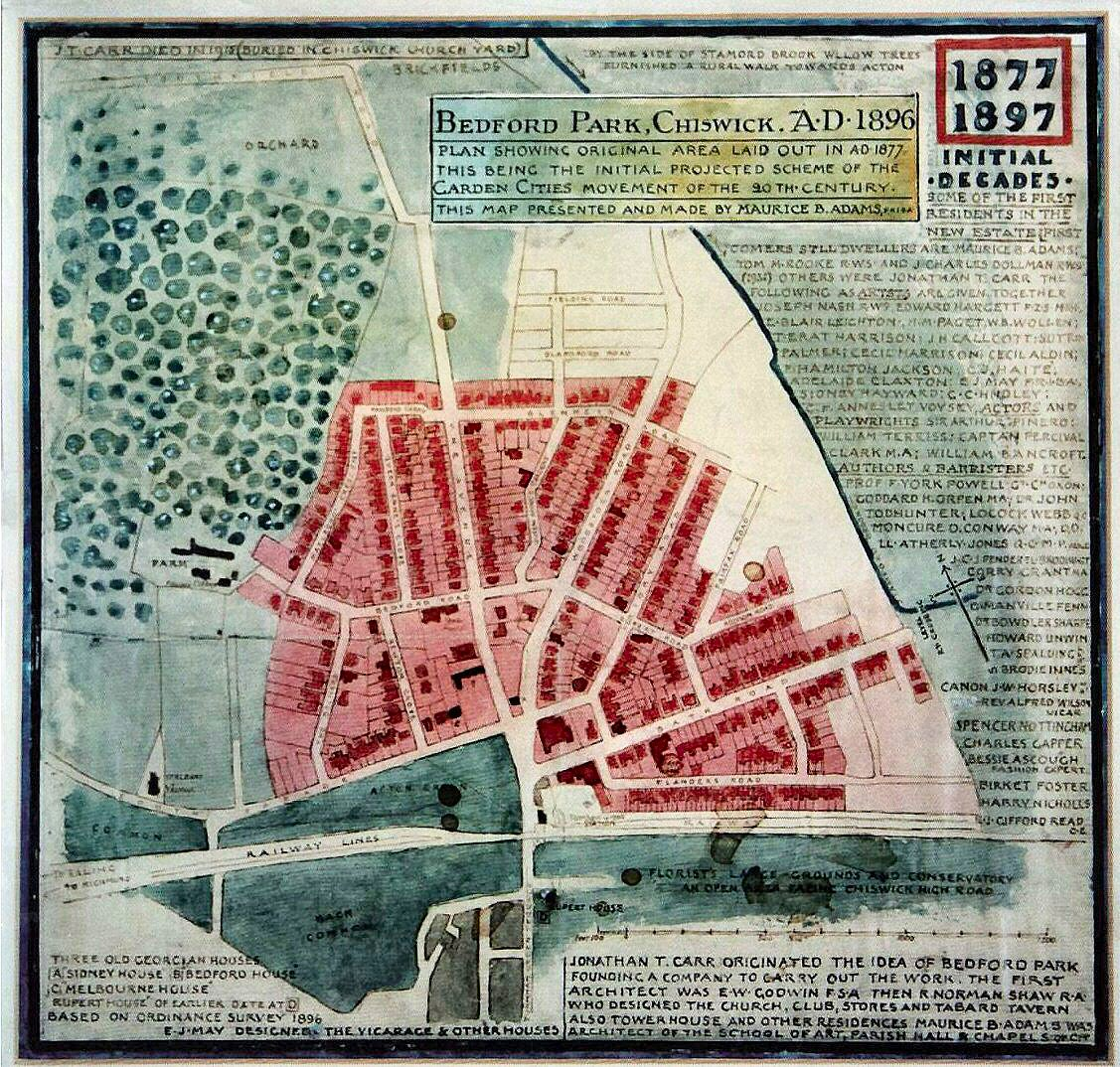
The architect Maurice Bingham Adams's map of the Bedford Park estate to the west of London, 1897

The Bedford Park estate was developed by Jonathan Carr, who in 1875 bought 24 acres (9.7 ha) of land in Chiswick just north of Turnham Green Station on the District Line, opened in 1869. The City of London was only 30 minutes by steam train. Carr began with 24 acres of farmland, surrounded by orchards; by 1883, the development had grown to 113 acres (46 ha) acres, with almost 500 houses. By 1915 it had become part of an integrated network of streets.

== A mixture of styles ==
Many of the best-known architects of the Victorian era contributed buildings in Bedford Park; two of them, E. J. May and Maurice Bingham Adams, chose to live on the estate. Between them, the architects contributed around 30 house designs, used repeatedly in a mix across the estate. The strong influence of Norman Shaw's designs on the other architects has resulted in a harmoniously unified effect.

Most of the houses are large, often detached or semi-detached, but there are some smaller terraced cottages, such as on Marlborough Crescent. Most, too, are in Queen Anne Revival style, meaning a mix of English and Flemish house styles from the 17th and 18th centuries, and sharply distinct from Victorian Gothic Revival style which recalled an earlier era, but elements of many other styles are included in some of the houses. The streets, too, have names from the time of Queen Anne (1665–1714), as for instance Addison Grove for Joseph Addison (1672–1719), Newton Grove for Isaac Newton (1642–1726), Blenheim Road for the Battle of Blenheim (1704), Marlborough Crescent for the Duke of Marlborough, victor of that battle, Woodstock Road for the site of Marlborough's Blenheim Palace, and Queen Anne's Gardens for the monarch herself.

Characteristic features of the houses are red brick, walls hung with tiles, gables of varying shapes, balconies, bay windows, terracotta and rubbed brick decorations, pediments, elaborate chimneys, and balustrades painted white. The eclectic approach is well seen in the estate church of St Michael and All Angels, where Shaw has incorporated Arts & Crafts, Georgian, medieval, Tudor, and Wren styles.

A mixture of styles and sizes

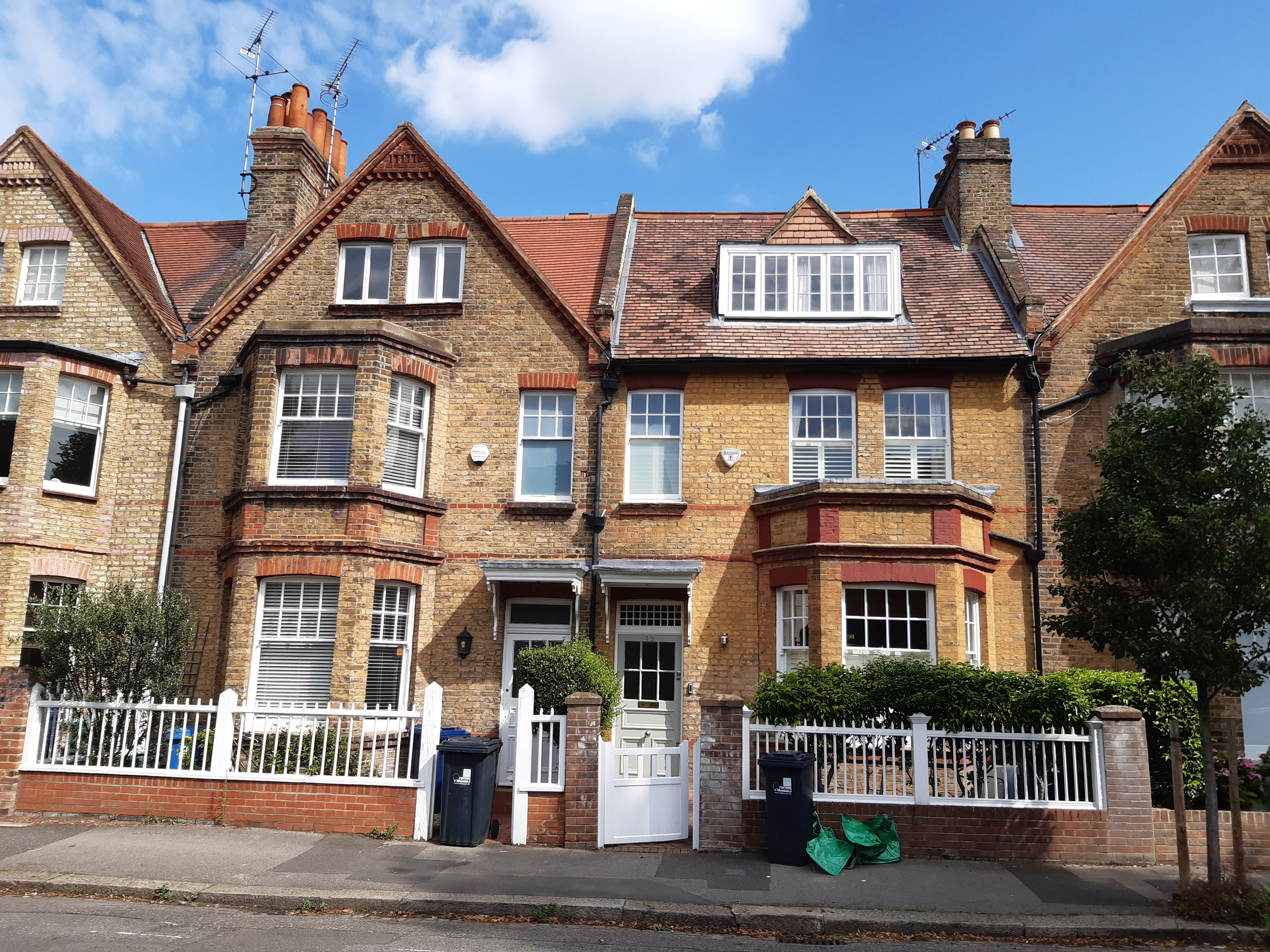
Smaller Bedford Park cottages, Marlborough Crescent

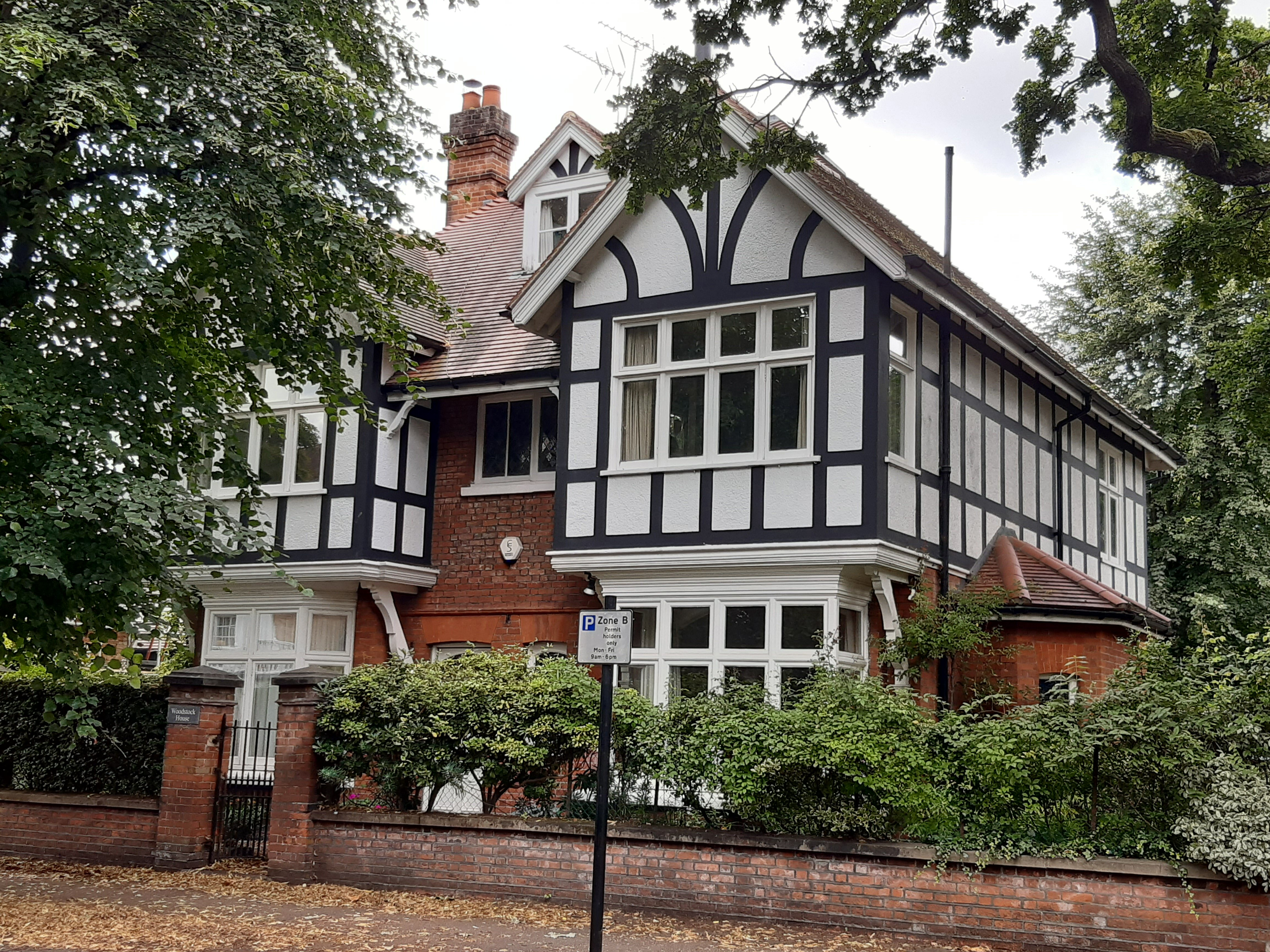
Mock Tudor style: Woodstock House, Woodstock Road

== Architects ==
=== Edward William Godwin ===
The first architect for the estate in 1876 was Edward William Godwin, a leading member of the Aesthetic Movement, but his plans were criticised in the leading journal The Builder, and Godwin and Carr parted company. Godwin's houses were in the Queen Anne Revival style, taken up by the other architects especially Shaw. The houses were thought poor, as they had steep staircases, a toilet in the same room as the bath, relatively small rooms, and narrow corridors. Only a few of his houses were built; they are taller and narrower than those built by other architects.

Building by Godwin

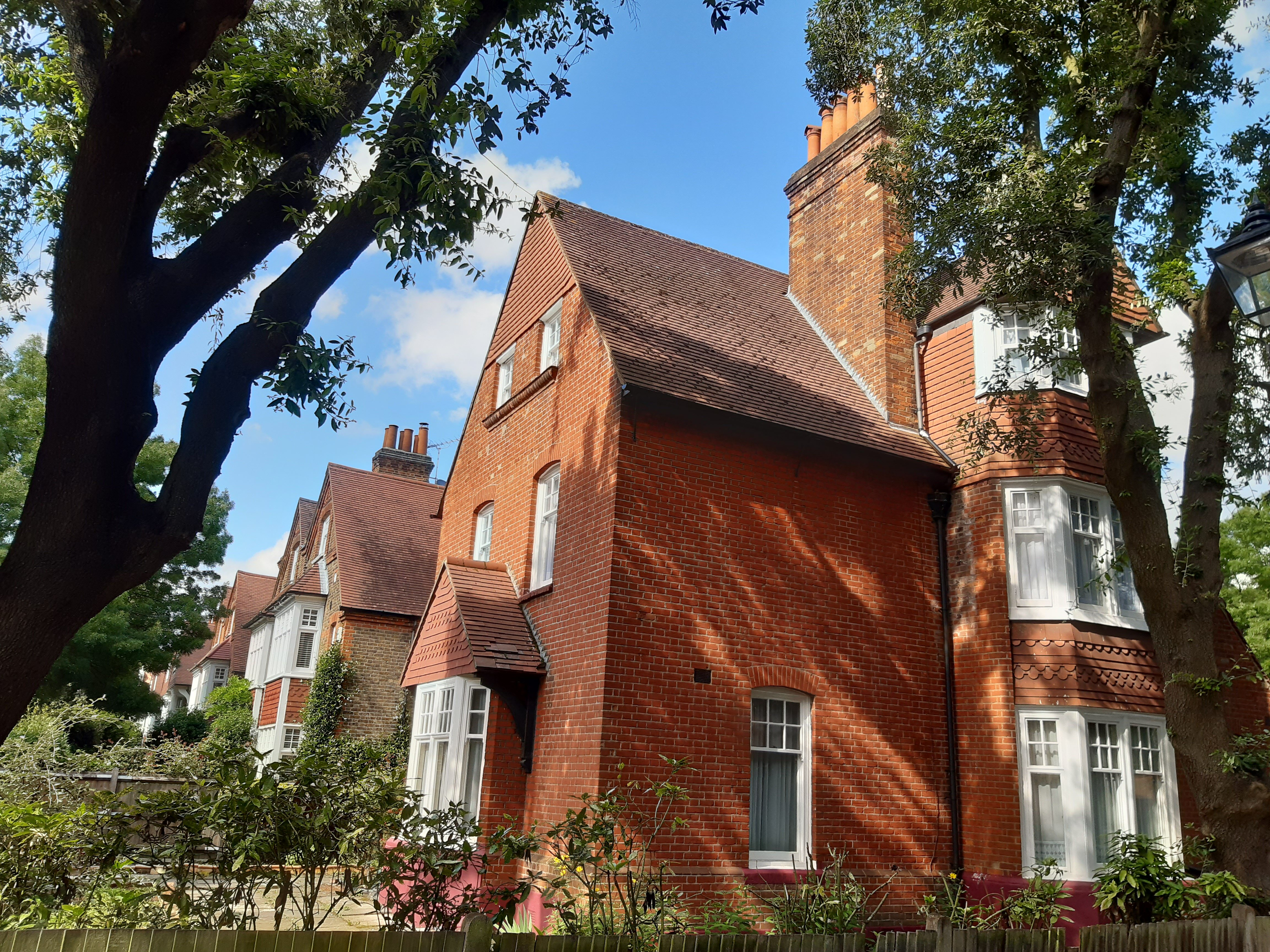
The Avenue first Bedford Park houses by E. W. Godwin, 1876

=== Henry Coe & Stephen Robinson ===
For a short period from 1876, some designs were commissioned from the short-lived Scottish architectural practice of Henry Edward Coe and Stephen Robinson. These were semi-detached villas with tall chimneys and paired gables, their plans published in The Building News in February 1877.

Building by Coe & Robinson

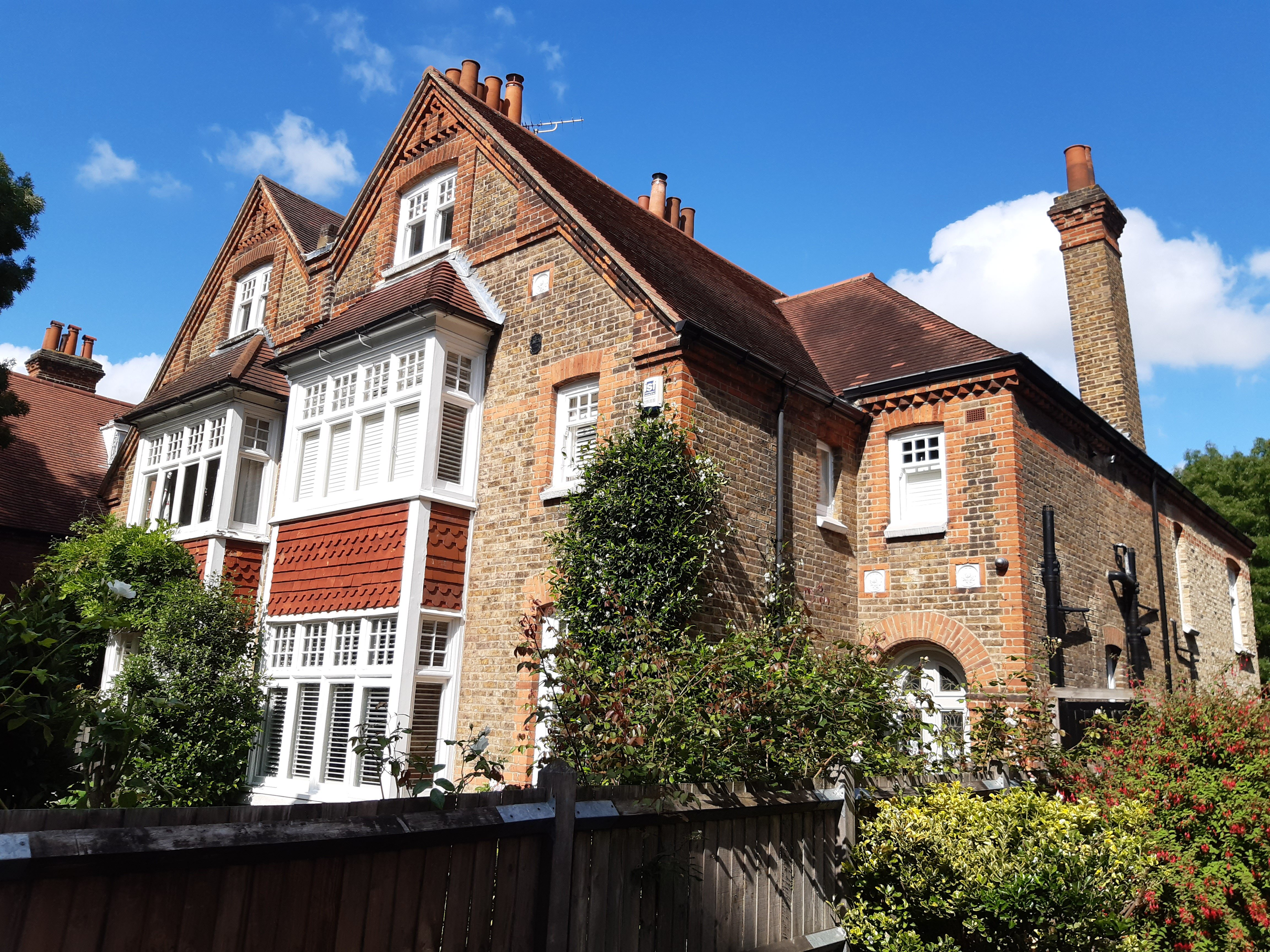
Among the first houses of Bedford Park was this one with paired gables on The Avenue by Coe & Robinson, 1876

=== Richard Norman Shaw ===
==== Domestic buildings ====
In 1877 Carr hired Richard Norman Shaw, the leading architect of his day, to be the estate architect. By then the layout of the Park had been set but Shaw's house designs, in the Queen Anne Revival style, gave the impression of great variety using only a few house types. Shaw built detached, semi-detached, and terraced houses in the estate. These were essentially scaled-down versions of the more expensive houses that he had designed for wealthy areas such as Chelsea, Hampstead, and Kensington. Some of his early houses had elaborate detail such as decorative sunflower panels; his later buildings were simpler. He designed the focal buildings of the estate, the church of St Michael and All Angels and the Tabard Inn opposite it, in 1879 to 1880. He resigned the post of estate architect in 1880, tired of Carr's combination of tight requirements and delayed payments. Shaw continued to work as a consultant to the project.

Houses by Shaw

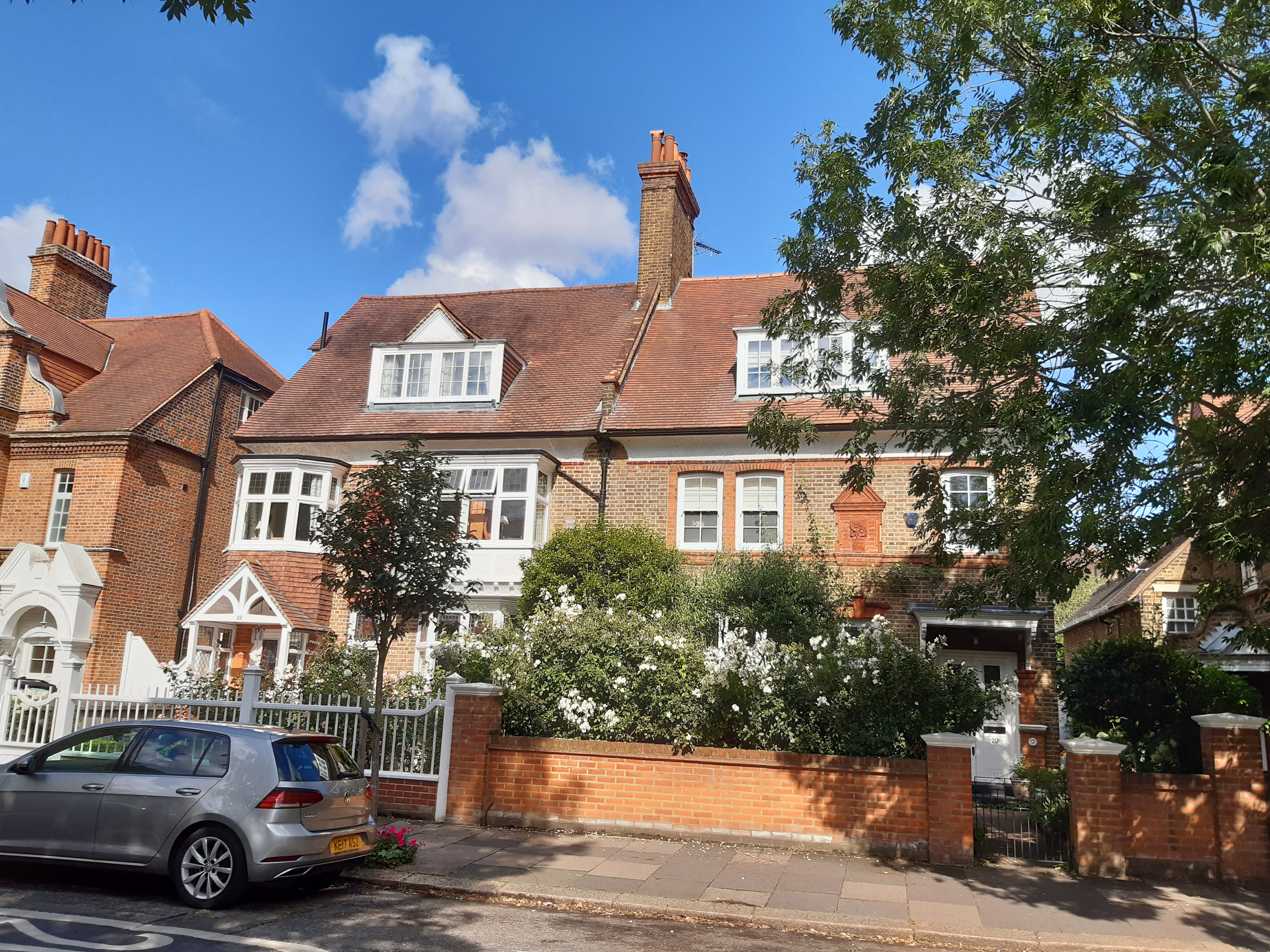
Norman Shaw's first semi-detached houses, The Avenue, 1878

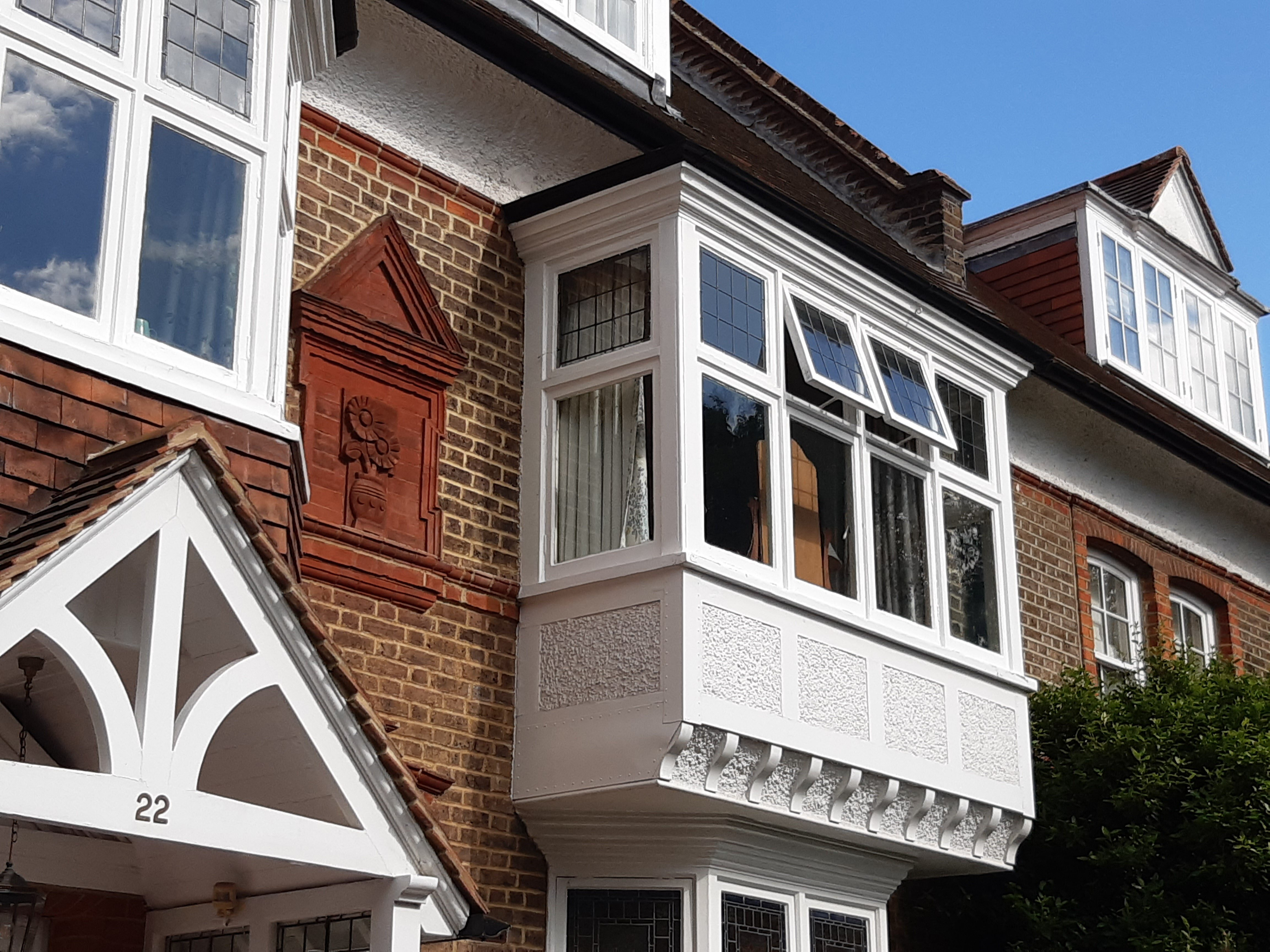
Details like sunflower panels and corbelled bay windows found only on Shaw's early houses

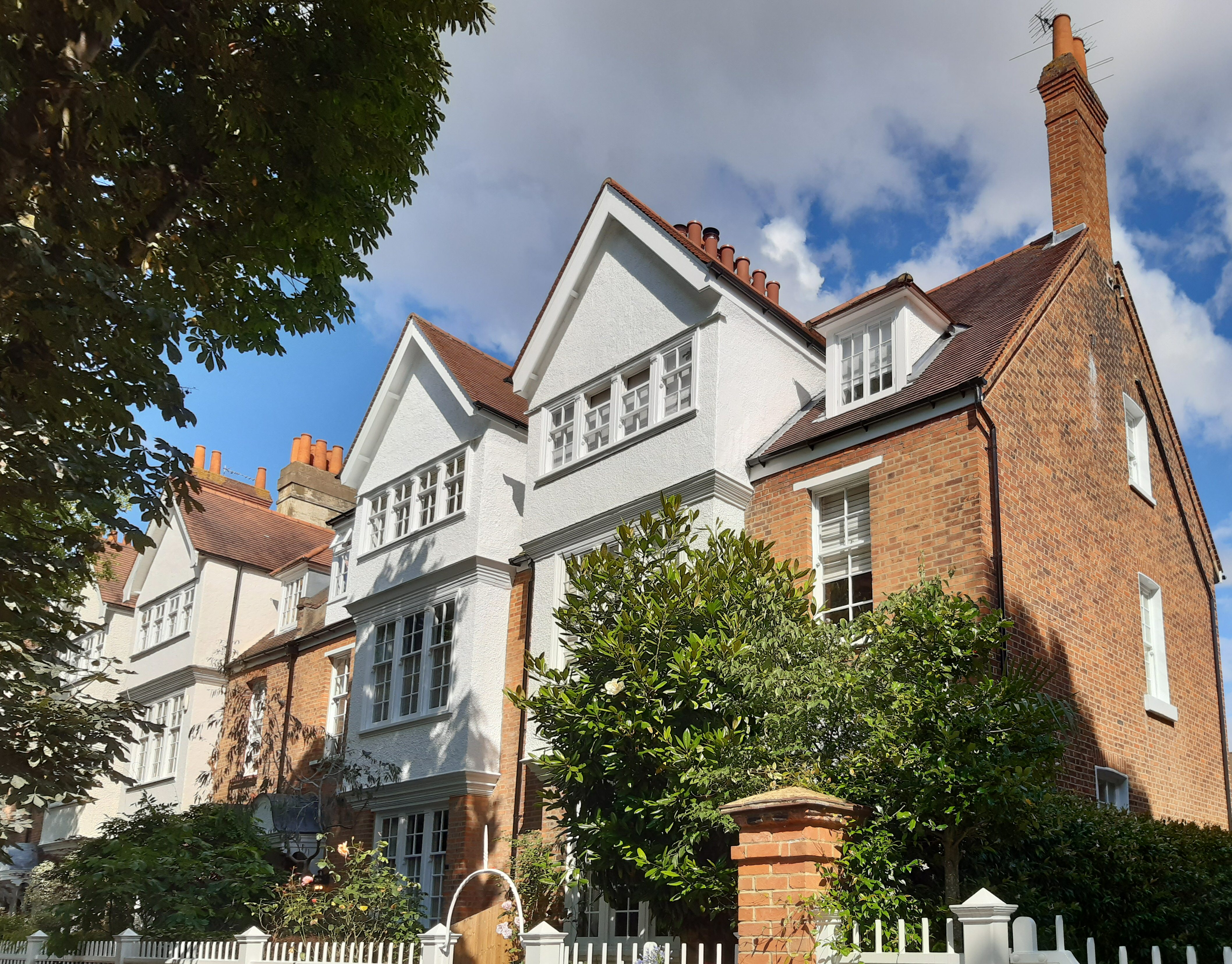
Norman Shaw's first terrace, Woodstock Road, 1878

==== Community buildings ====
Shaw provided the estate's focus with his community buildings, again in Queen Anne Revival style. Carr's intention was to create a functioning community by providing places for estate residents to socialise, worship, and drink together, and to shop locally for groceries; there was also a school of art, designed by the Arts and Crafts architect Maurice Bingham Adams. An early building was the Bedford Park Club on The Avenue, setting the tone with its red brick and domestic style. The interior, now extensively reworked, was by E. J. May. The building now serves as the London Buddhist Vihara. He designed a single block with matching heights but varying architectural details to contain the Stores, a manager's house, and the "Hostelry", now The Tabard pub downstairs and the Chiswick Playhouse theatre upstairs. This was influential in the design of later suburbs. His sources of inspiration for The Tabard were most likely Staple Inn, Holborn, which similarly has seven gables, and Sparrowe's House, Ipswich, which has projecting bays.

Shaw built St Michael and All Angels Church in a similar style to his Bedford Park houses, with domestic features from seventeenth and eighteenth century properties. This was an unusual choice for an ecclesiastical building, though he incorporated a measure of Perpendicular Gothic alongside the Queen Anne style red brick, white woodwork, and dormer windows. The church was consecrated in 1880.

Shaw's community buildings

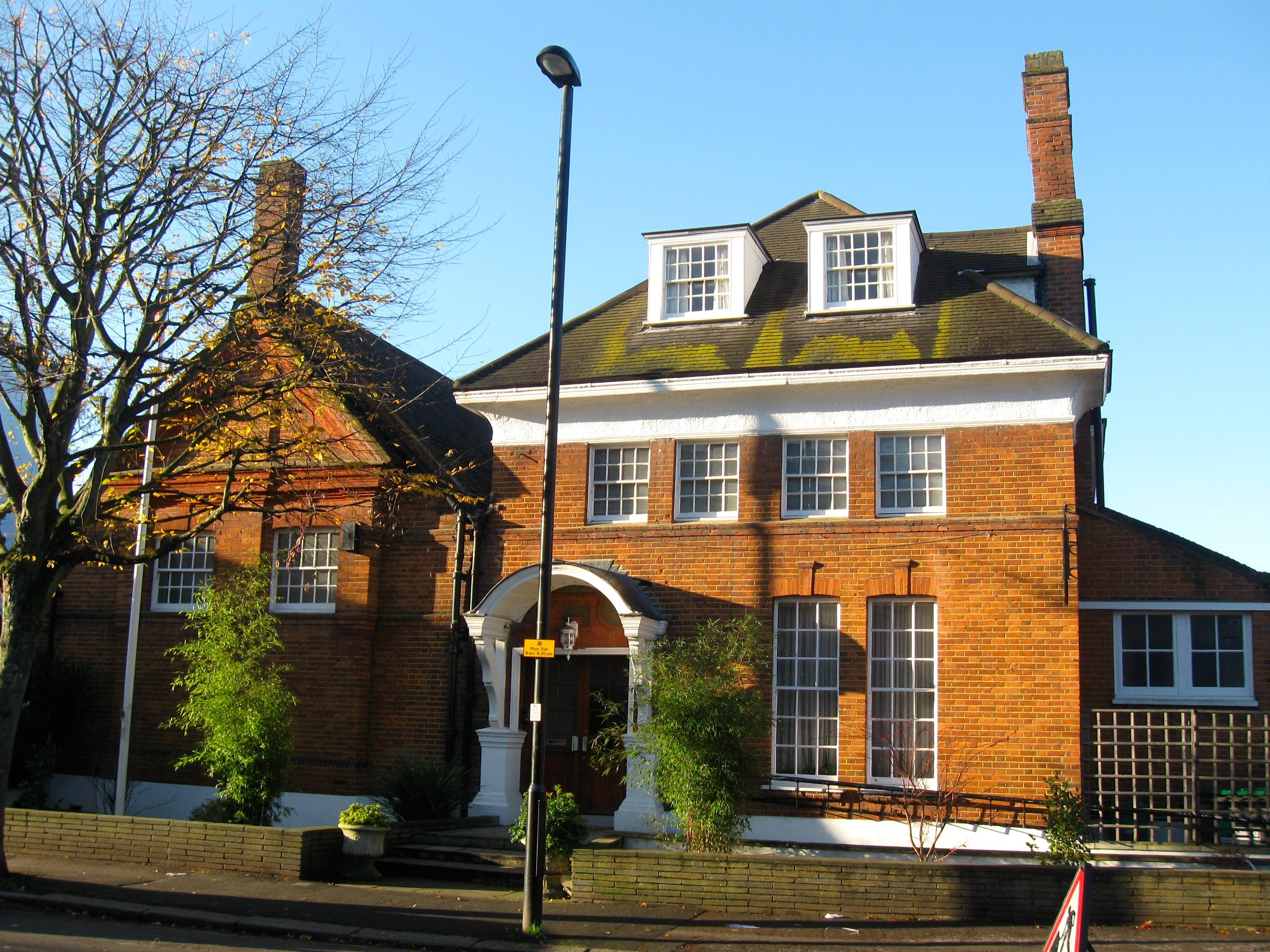
The estate social club on The Avenue by Norman Shaw, 1878

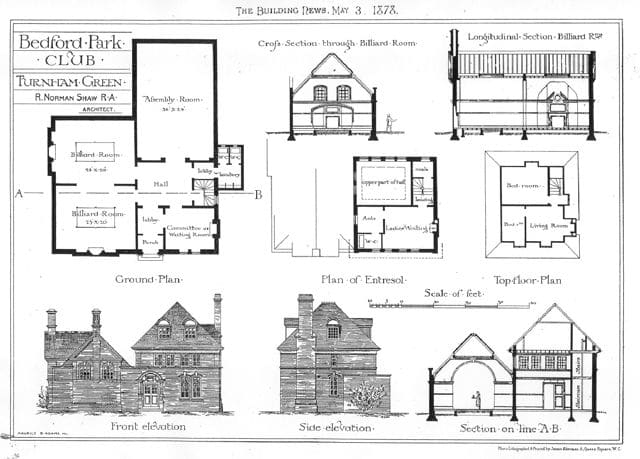
Shaw's 1878 plans for Bedford Park Club, with two billiard rooms

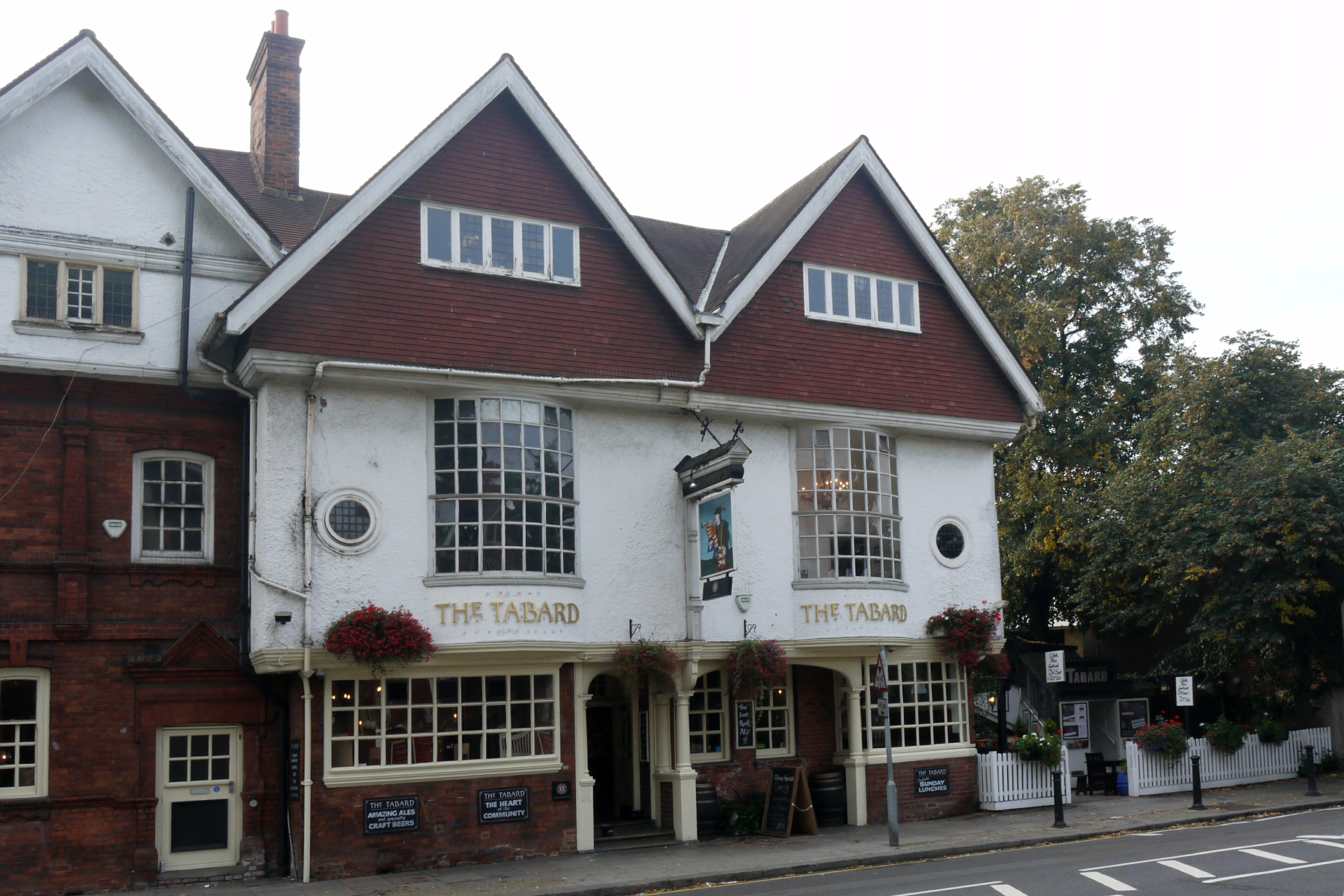
The estate inn, The Tabard by Shaw, Bath Road, 1879

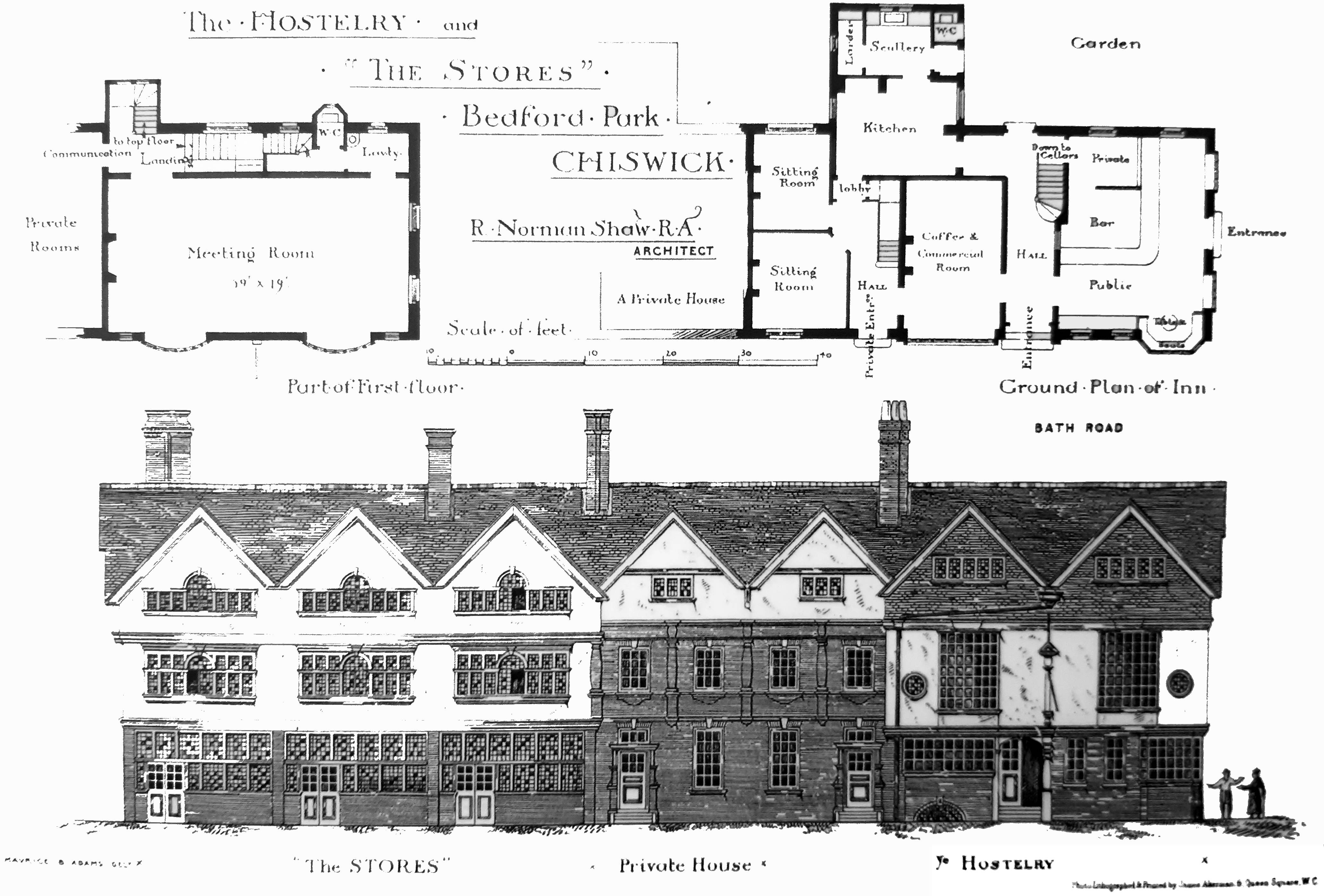
Shaw's plan for Bedford Park Stores and Hostelry 1880

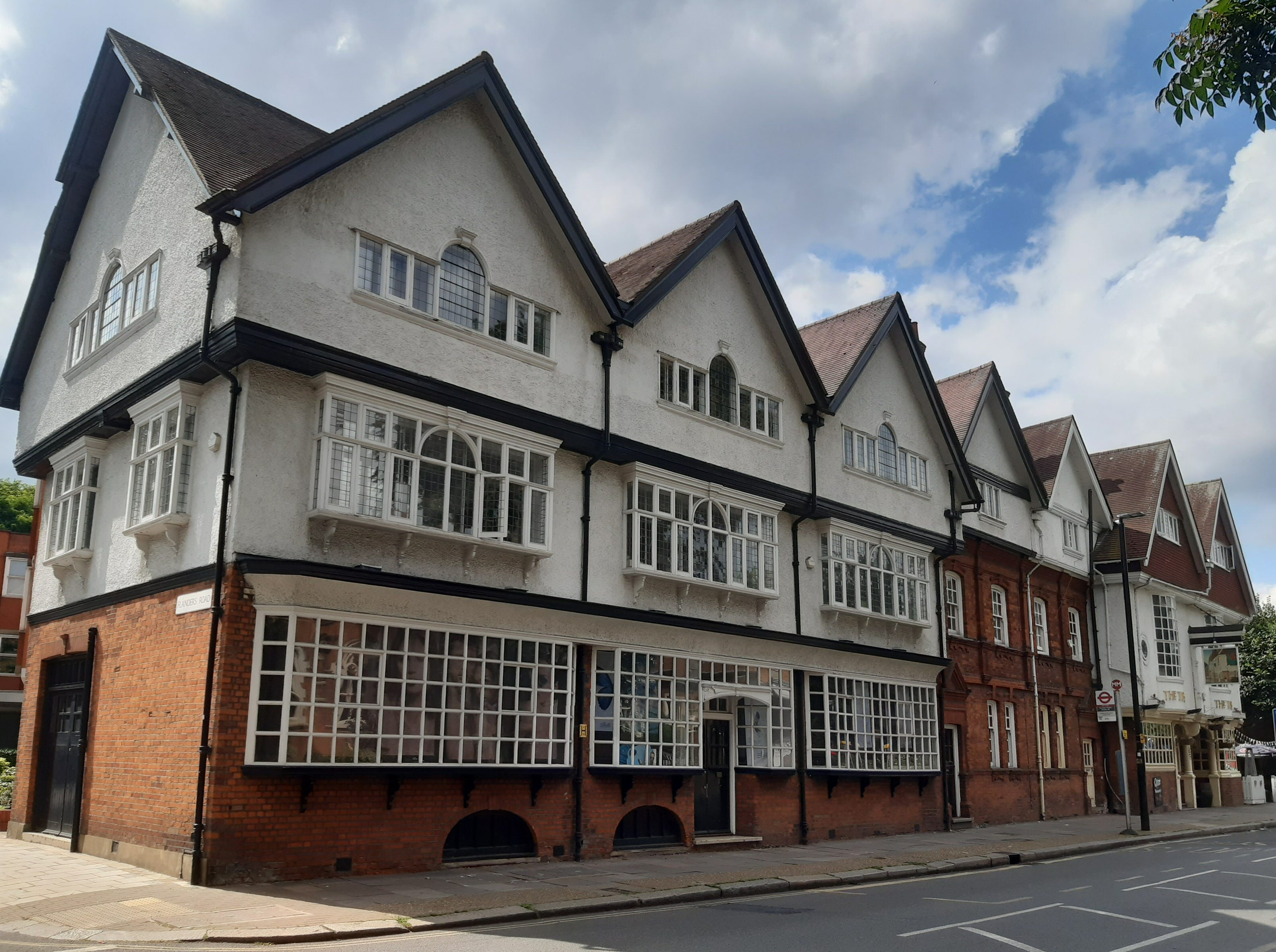
The estate shop, the Bedford Park Stores (with a private house and The Tabard), all by Shaw, 1880

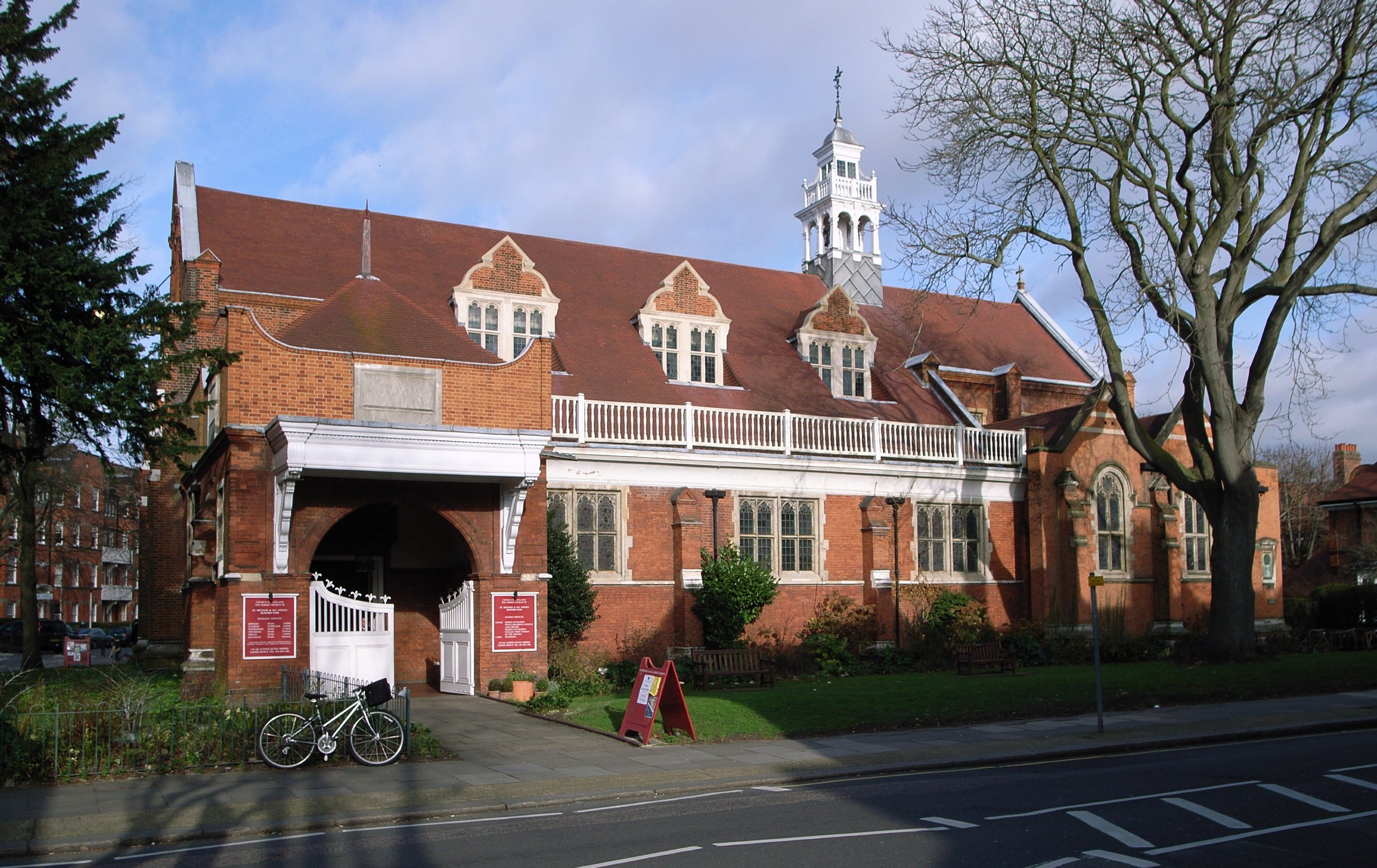
The estate church of St Michael and All Angels by Shaw, 1880

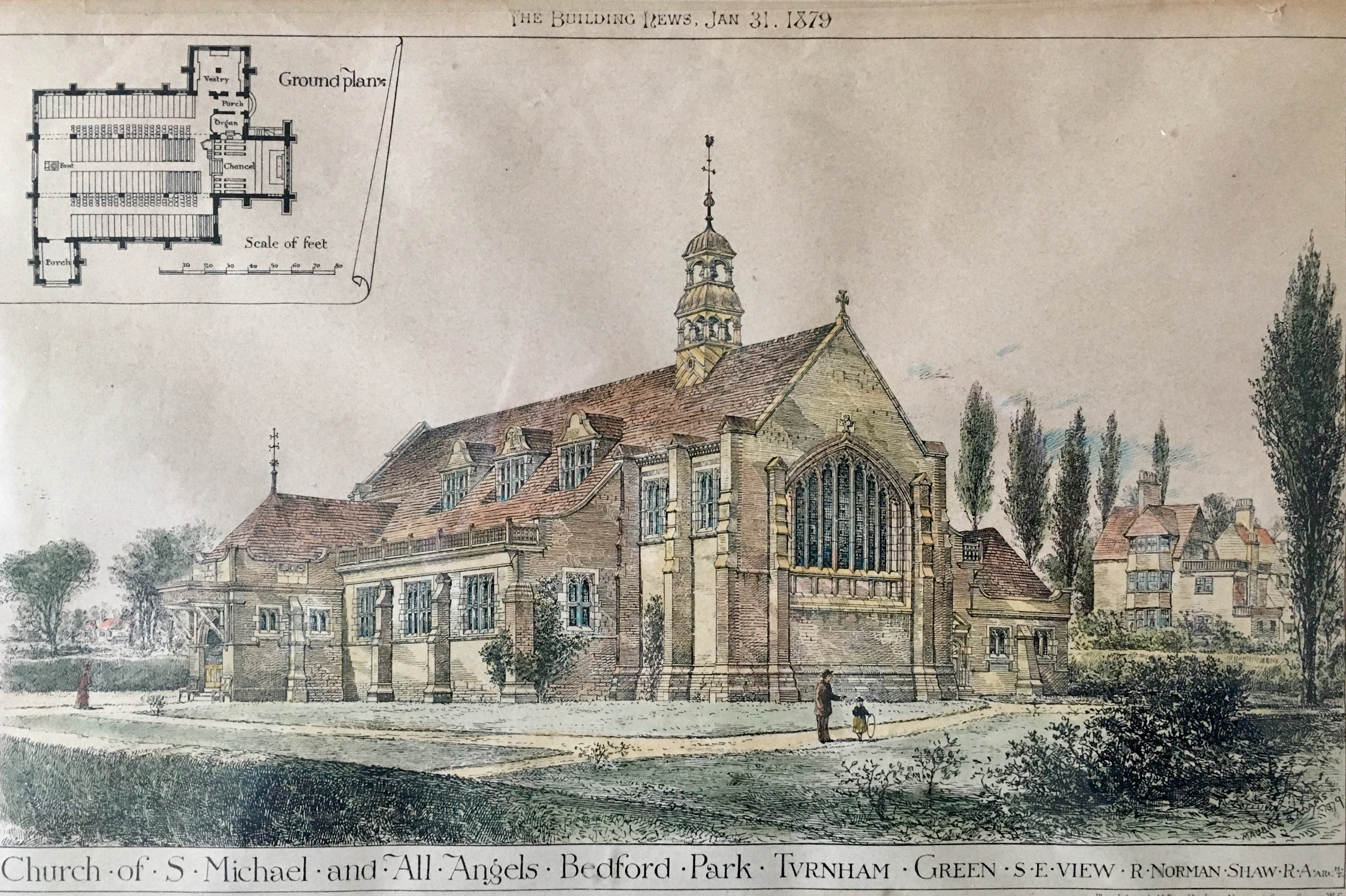
Shaw's St Michael and All Angels, drawn by Maurice Bingham Adams for Building News, 1879

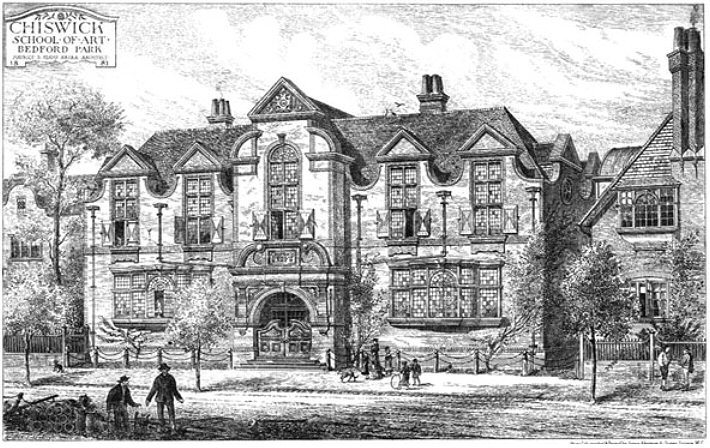
Design for Chiswick School of Art by Maurice Bingham Adams, 1881

=== E. J. May ===
In 1880, E. J. May took over as Estate architect, adding Priory Gardens and some houses in Addison Grove and Queen Anne's Grove; he lived in no. 6 Queen Anne's Grove during the 1880s. Priory House is used as the Chiswick and Bedford Park Preparatory School. May built a terrace in Marlborough Crescent, and many of the houses on The Orchard.

Buildings by May

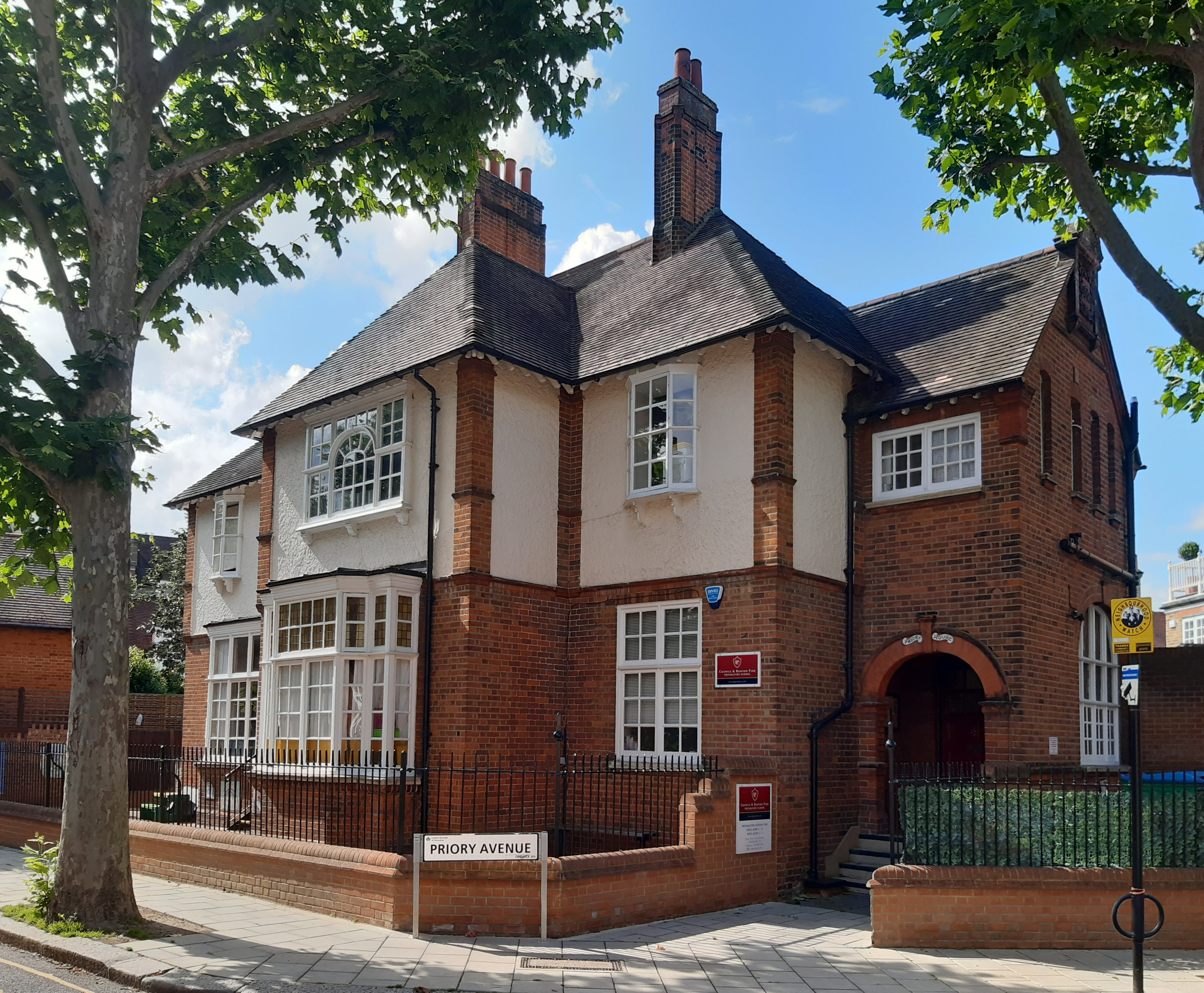
Priory House, Priory Gardens by E. J. May, 1882

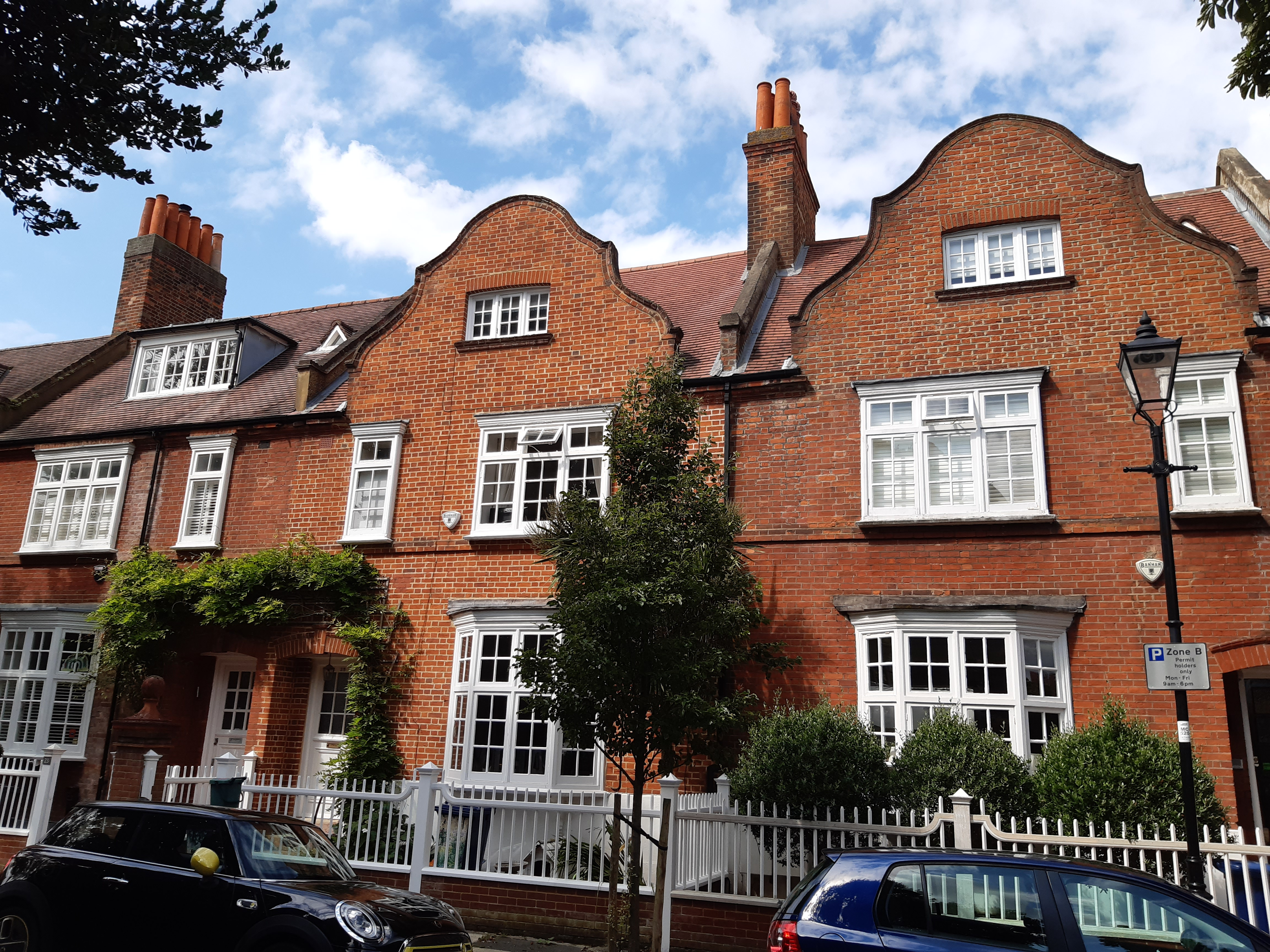
Terrace with shaped gables, Marlborough Crescent, 1880s

=== Henry Wilson ===
Henry Wilson designed only a few houses, in Bedford Park or elsewhere; he worked mainly on ecclesiastical buildings. He appears to have been the architect of two houses in Queen Anne's Gardens, including no. 7 for the artist T. M. Rooke. It is unusual for Bedford Park in having a large garden, and in being set far back from the road amidst its lawns.

Building by Wilson

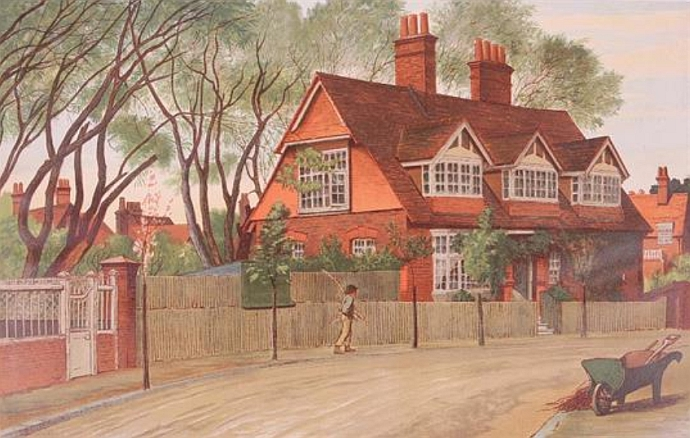
7 Queen Anne's Gardens, probably by Henry Wilson for the watercolourist T. M. Rooke. Painting by Henry Marriott Paget, 1882

=== Maurice Bingham Adams ===
The arts and crafts architect Maurice Bingham Adams built nos. 12 to 14 Newton Grove for the painter and illustrator John Charles Dollman in 1880, with a studio on the first floor. No. 12 later became the home of the architect Thomas Affleck Greeves, co-founder of the Bedford Park Society; the building is marked as historic with a Bedford Park green plaque. He designed the Chiswick School of Art on Bath Road in 1881, destroyed by a V-1 flying bomb in 1944, and replaced on the same site by the Arts Educational Schools. The school was meant to provide the estate with a feeling of community. Adams designed the parish hall and north aisle extension to the estate church of St Michael and All Angels in 1887.

Buildings by Adams

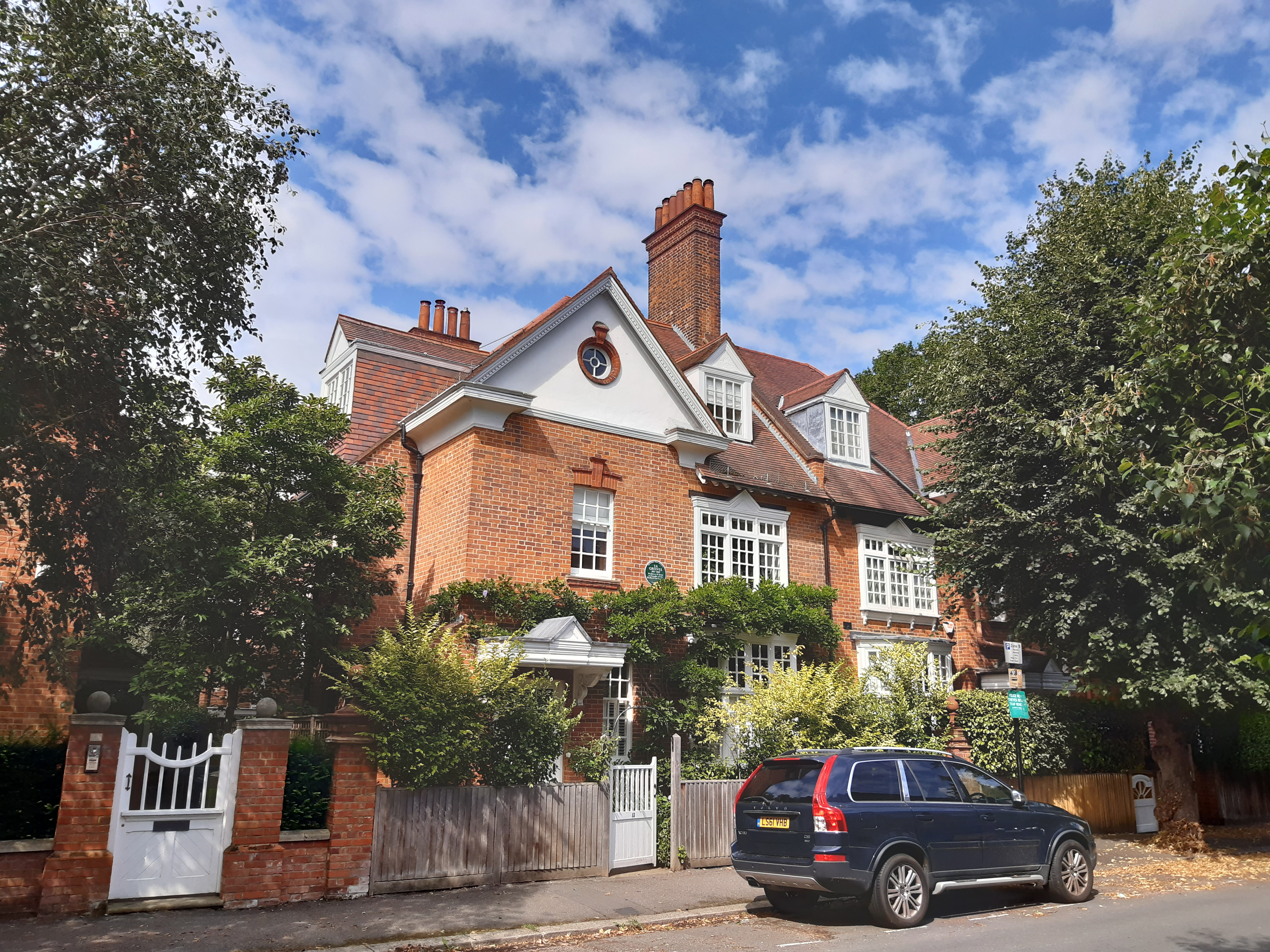
Maurice Bingham Adams houses on Newton Grove for John Charles Dollman, 1880

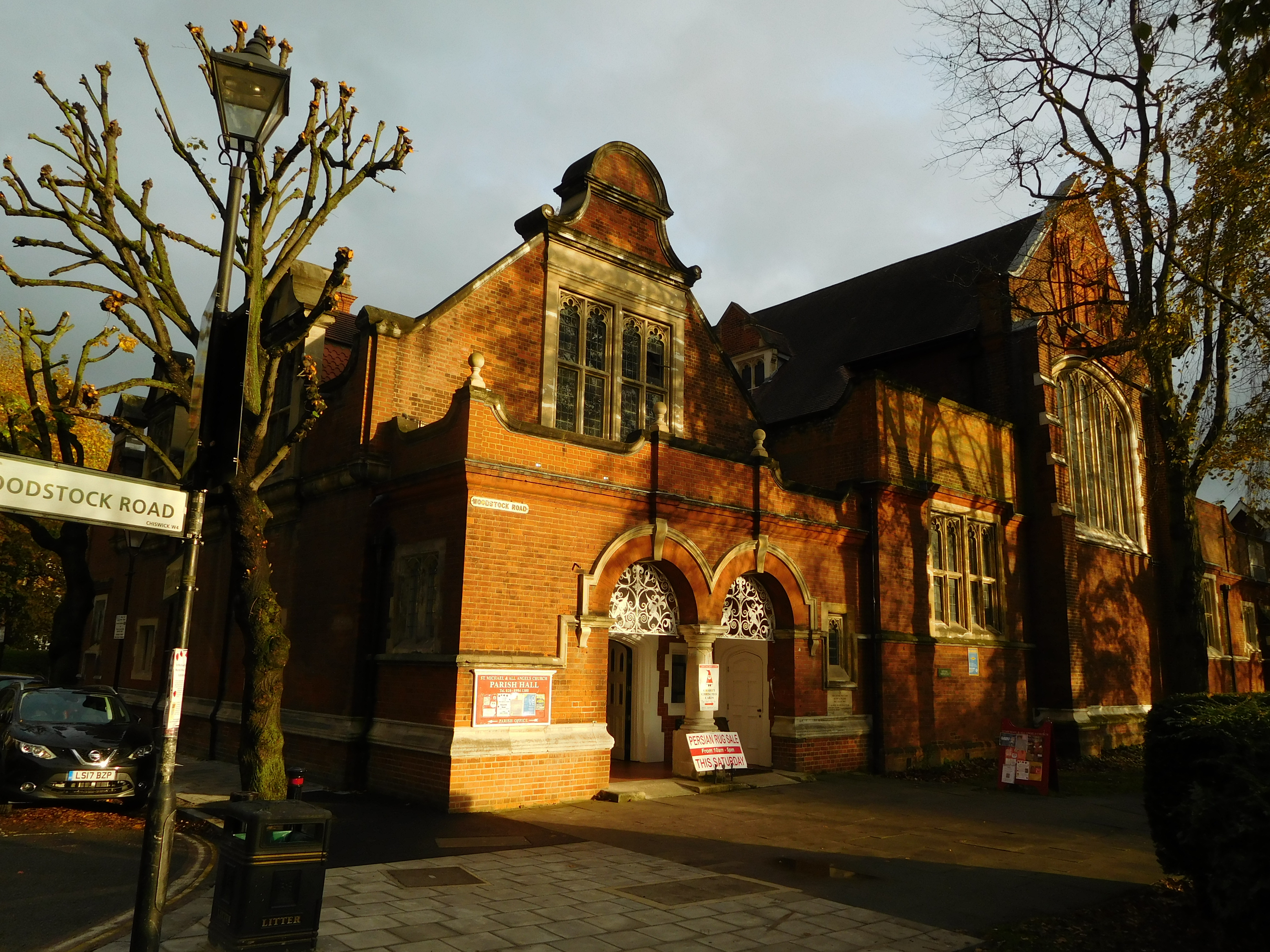
Church hall and north aisle extension to Shaw's St Michael and All Angels, 1887

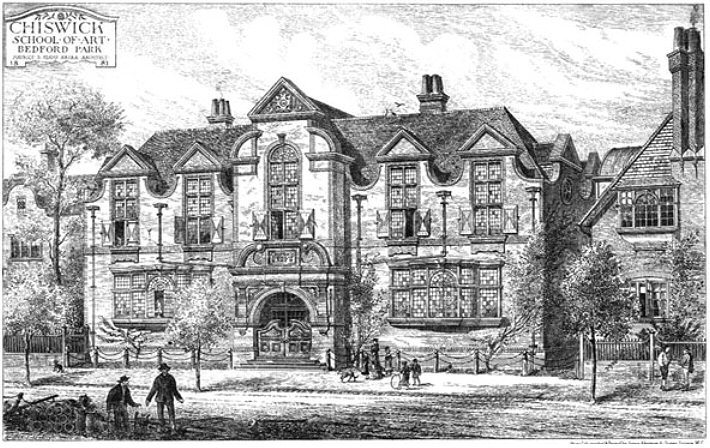
Design for Chiswick School of Art, Bath Road, 1881

=== C.F.A. Voysey ===
Carr's company collapsed in 1886, and the remaining house-plots were sold piecemeal to other developers; houses went on being built by a variety of architects on the estate until 1914. The architect and furniture and textile designer C.F.A. Voysey created a distinctive building at no. 14, South Parade, facing Acton Green common, in 1891. It is a tower house with the top floor given over entirely to a studio for his client, the artist and author J. W. Forster. The house is covered in roughcast, and has metal-framed windows with stone dressings. The eaves of the roof project conspicuously and are supported by thin metal brackets. Pevsner comments that the house was clearly intended to oppose the suburb's "red brick cosiness". Voysey added the side extension in 1894. It was Grade II* listed in 1970, with the comment "Of greatest historical importance". The literary critic Ian Fletcher called it "the most remarkable of Bedford Park's houses".

Building by Voysey

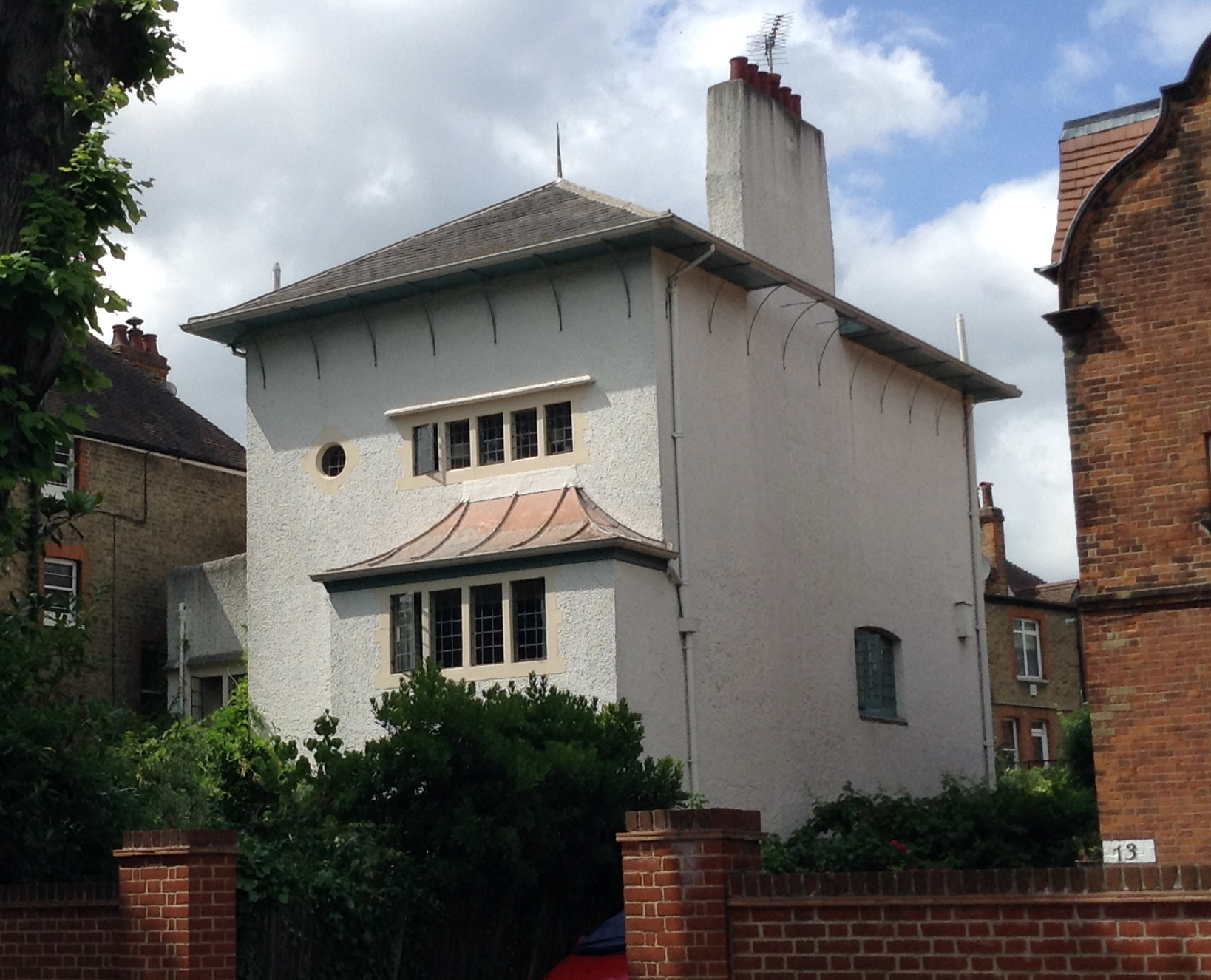
Artist's cottage by C.F.A. Voysey, 14 South Parade

=== Fritz Ruhemann and Michael Dugdale ===
No. 2 South Parade is a low modernist house, built 1938–1939 by the German architect Friedrich "Fritz" Abraham Ruhemann and the Tecton Group architect Michael Dugdale for Leo Neumann, like Ruhemann a recent immigrant from Nazi Germany. It has a flat roof and a spacious terrace on the first floor with a curving sun roof and a matching flat-topped curved concrete entrance porch. The house is constructed of yellowish-red brick and concrete with an open-plan interior. It was Grade II listed in 1991, with the comment that "The house and its fittings are a remarkable survival of a compact house reliant for its convenience on well-designed fitted furniture".

Building by Ruhemann and Dugdale

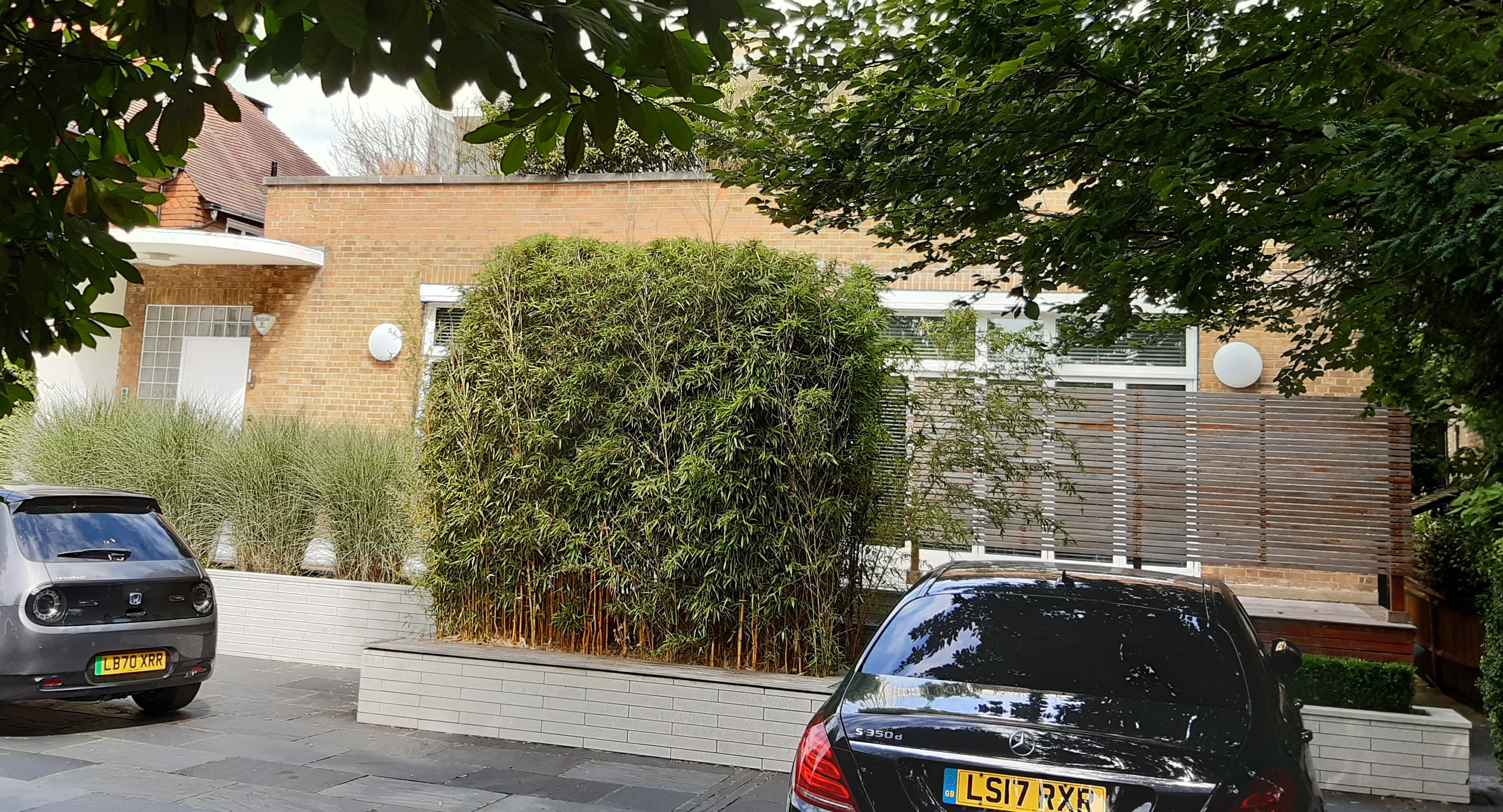
No 2 South Parade by Fritz Ruhemann and Michael Dugdale 1938-1939

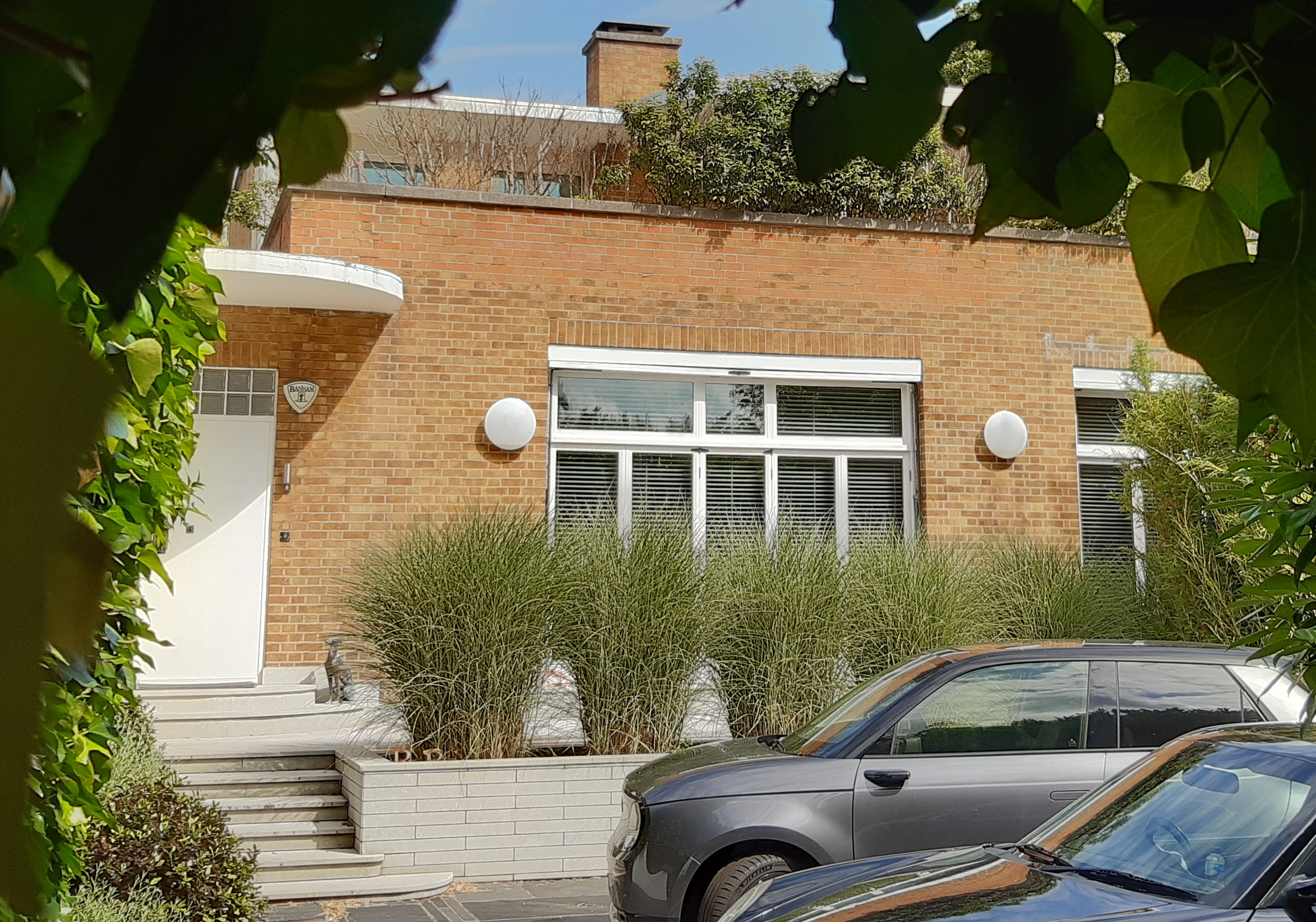
No 2 South Parade, modernist entrance with curved concrete porch and curved roof terrace
