= Thomas Rooke =

Thomas Rooke may refer to:

- Thomas Charles Byde Rooke, English physician who married into the royal family of the Kingdom of Hawaii
- Thomas Matthews Rooke, British watercolourist
