= The Tabard, Chiswick =

Pub in Chiswick, London

Coordinates: 51.495704°N 0.254605°W

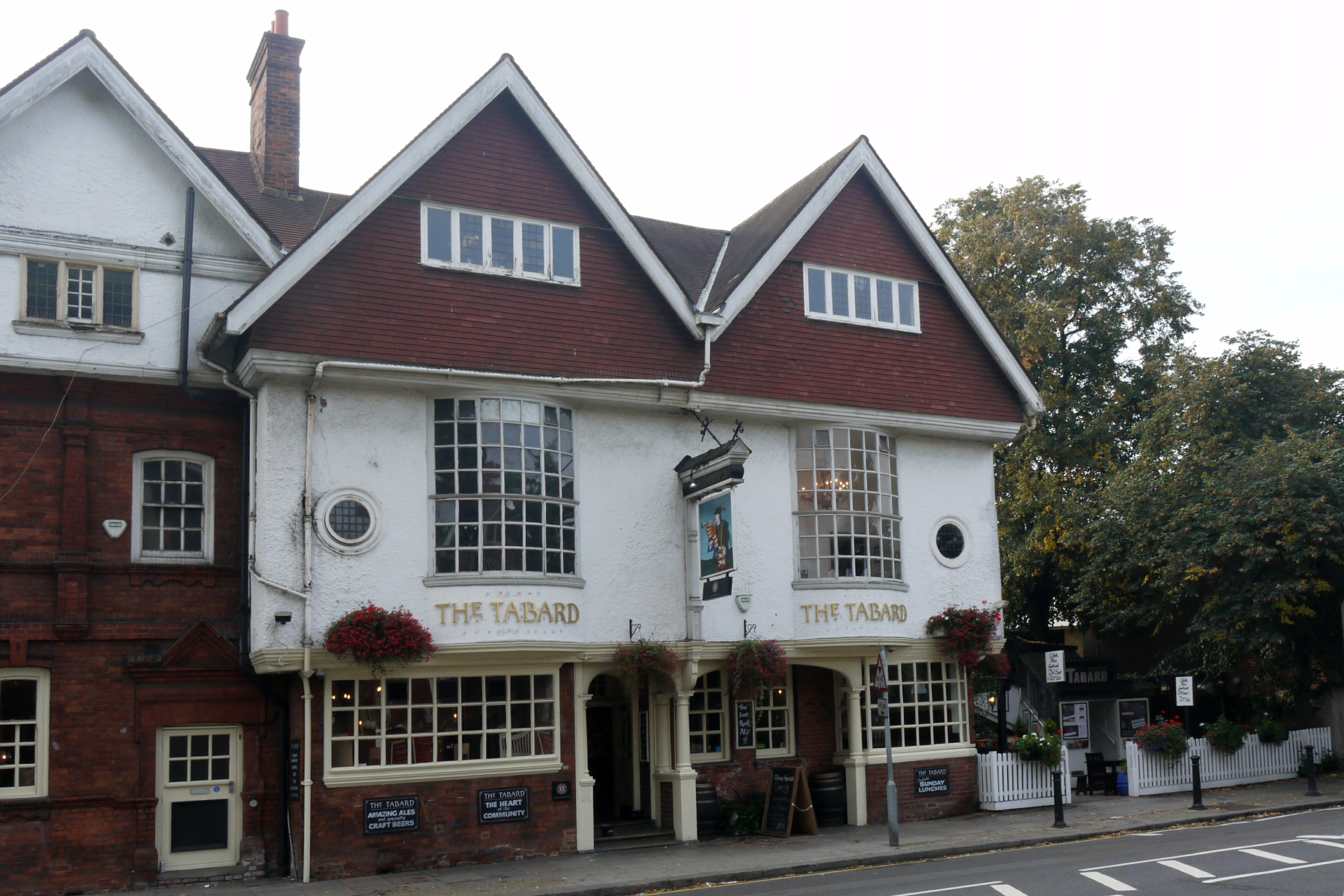
The Tabard

The block of three buildings containing The Tabard public house (formerly the Tabard Inn) is a Grade II* listed structure in Chiswick, London. The block, with a row of seven gables in its roof, was designed by Norman Shaw in 1880 as part of the community focus of the Bedford Park garden suburb. The block contains the Bedford Park Stores, once a co-operative, and a house for the manager.

The first floor of the pub building is host to the Tabard Theatre.

The block was most likely inspired by Holborn's 1585 Staple Inn, which similarly has a row of seven gables; a further inspiration is the 15th century Sparrowe's House, Ipswich, which has strongly projecting bays, gables, and a cornice above a row of shop windows.

== Building ==
=== Purpose ===
The block, including no. 2 Bath Road, was built in 1880 by the architect Norman Shaw as part of the communal focus of Jonathan Carr's development of the Bedford Park garden suburb; it included the inn, a house for the manager, and the Bedford Park Stores. The block is near the corner with Acton Green, facing St Michael and All Angels, Bedford Park, built at the same time as the community's church. The other two community buildings are the school of art, a little further up Bath Road, and the club house, on The Avenue.

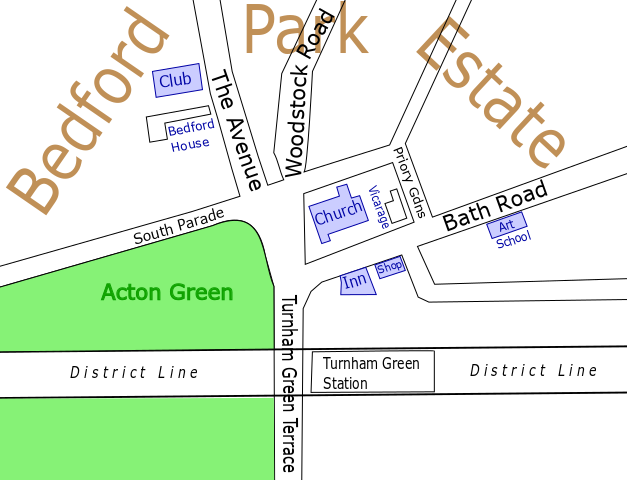
The Tabard inn and the Bedford Park Stores were among the community buildings meant to form the focal point of Jonathan Carr's Bedford Park garden suburb.

=== Inspiration for design ===
A group from the Architectural Association paid a visit in January 1880 and commented that "the buildings will comprise a row or terrace of seven gables, like the old row in Holborn, and will include, beside the stores, a private house for the manager, [and] an old-fashioned inn". The essayist Ian Fletcher writes that the row of seven gables mentioned is presumably Staple Inn, Holborn, but that Shaw probably drew the "heavily projecting bays" from Sparrowe's House, Ipswich. That 15th century building, reworked in 1567, has gables and a cornice; it is decorated inside with ornamental ceilings and panelling.

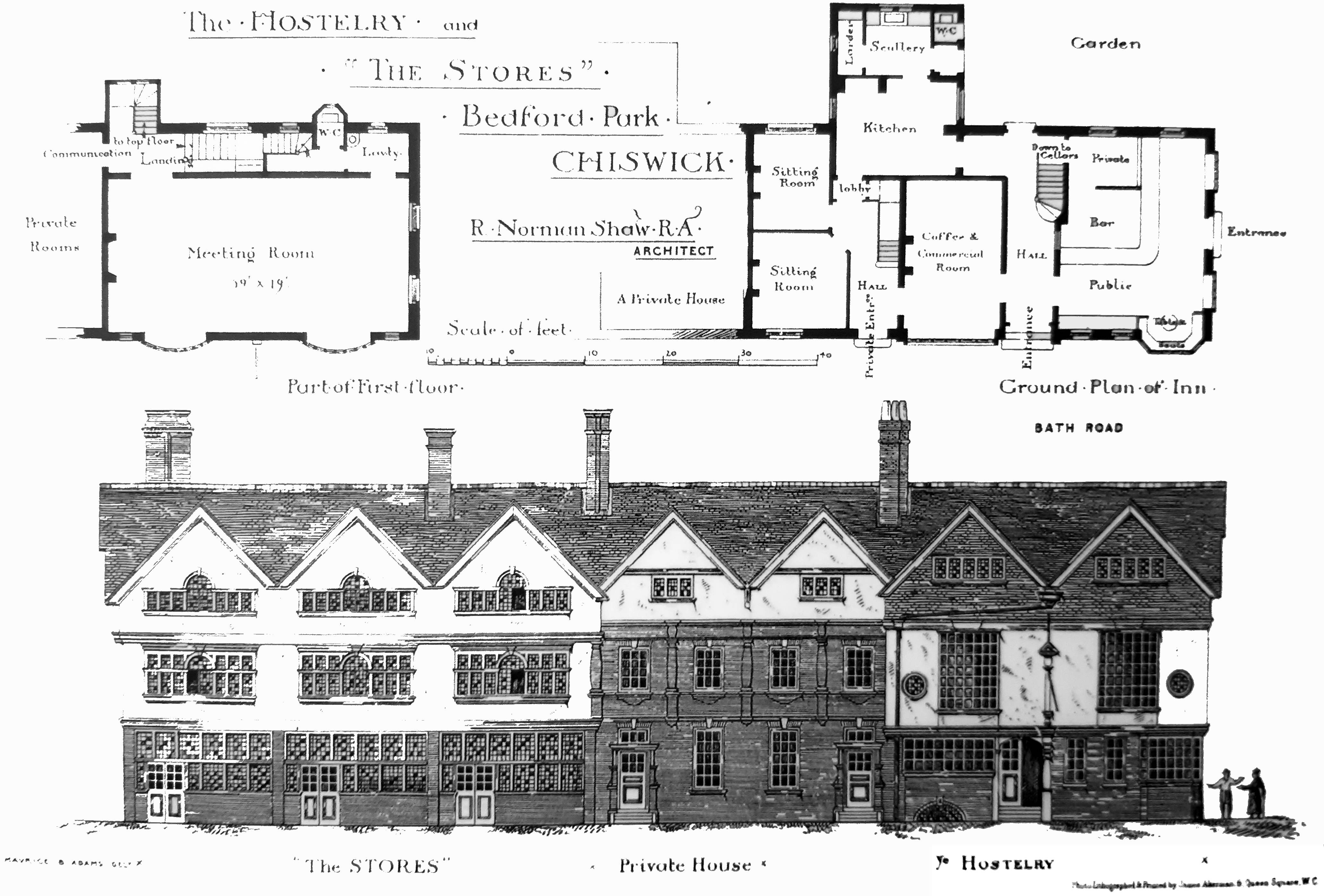
Norman Shaw and Maurice Bingham Adams's plan for Bedford Park Stores and Hostelry, 1880

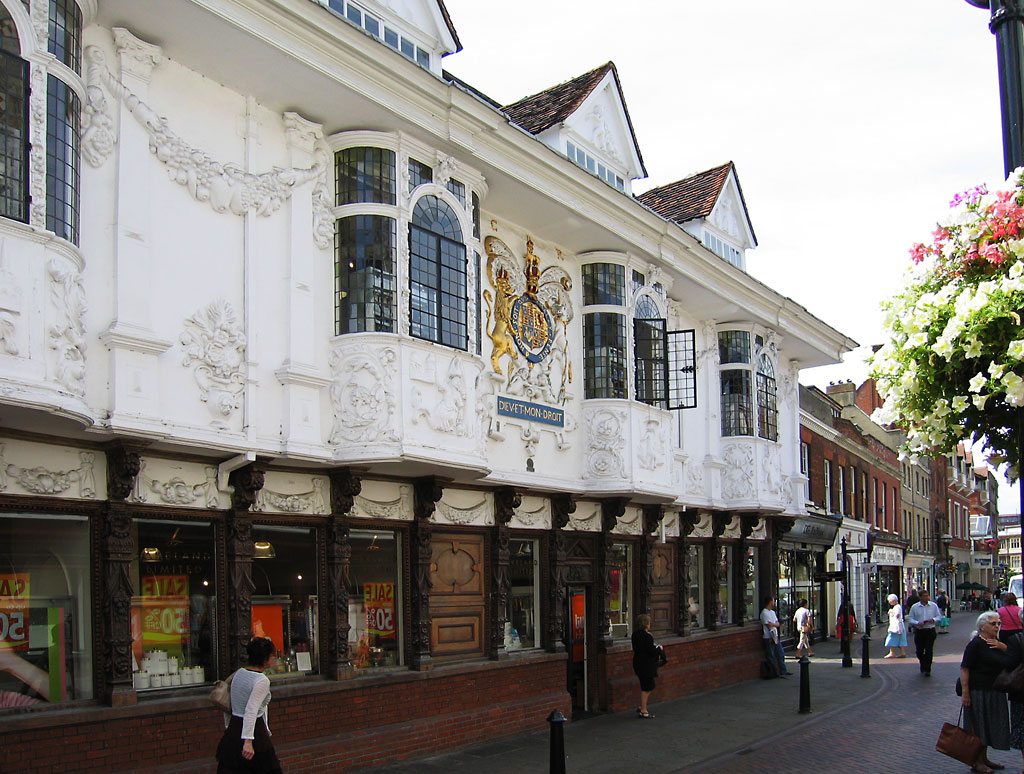
The "heavily projecting bays" of the 15th century Sparrowe's House, Ipswich

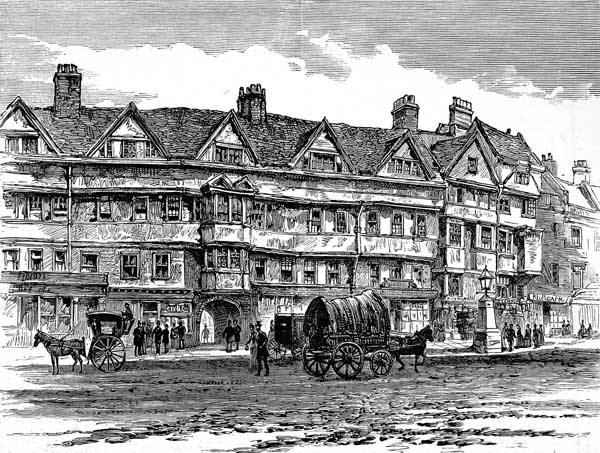
The "seven gables" of Staple Inn, Holborn, 1585, as it looked in the 1880s

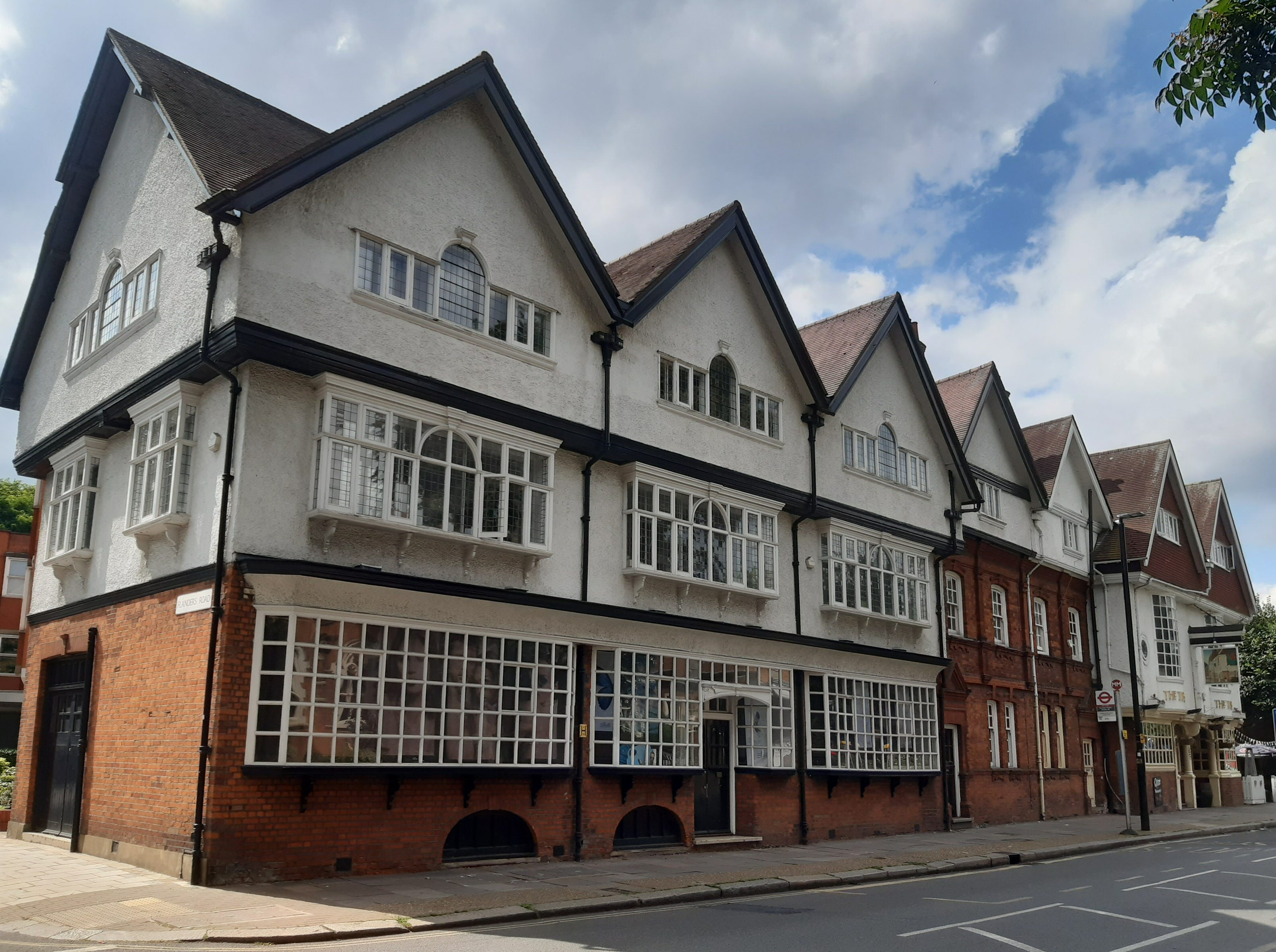
The Bedford Park Stores, the manager's house, and The Tabard

=== Exterior ===
The 3-storey block containing the stores, manager's house, and pub is built in red brick and roughcast, in Norman Shaw's British Queen Anne Revival (also called English Domestic Revival) style. The roofs are tiled. Of the seven bays on the front, facing Bath Road, three are for the stores and two each for the house, with recessed gables, and the pub. According to Historic England, the Bedford Park buildings were "highly influential" on later suburbs, and were "widely imitated" both across Britain and in the United States. The architectural historian Gavin Stamp comments that Victorian era pub architecture was a "vulgar trade", mainly a matter for specialist architects such as Shoebridge & Rising who for example designed the nearby Duke of Sussex, Acton Green, so that The Tabard and Norman Shaw formed an exception. Stamp saw it as significant that the pub's name evoked "Chaucer and Olde England", while the building looked nothing like "a contemporary gin palace".

==== Pub ====
The Tabard pub has an entrance porch with Tuscan columns; to either side are windows divided into many small panes. The roughcast first floor of the pub has a pair of projecting bow windows, with small round windows on either side; a third similar gable faces west. A cornice forms an overhang above the windows, topped by two tile-hung gables, each with five small mullioned windows. The architectural historian Nikolaus Pevsner described the Tabard as "especially attractive, with tile-hung gables and very original shallow-curved, completely glazed bay-windows". The swing sign was painted in 1880 by Thomas Matthews Rooke, one of the artists resident in Bedford Park. The original sign was lost, but it was rediscovered during the 2016 refurbishment.

The pub, depicted by Thomas Erat Harrison, was among the buildings celebrated in an 1882 illustrated book Bedford Park on the then-fashionable garden suburb.

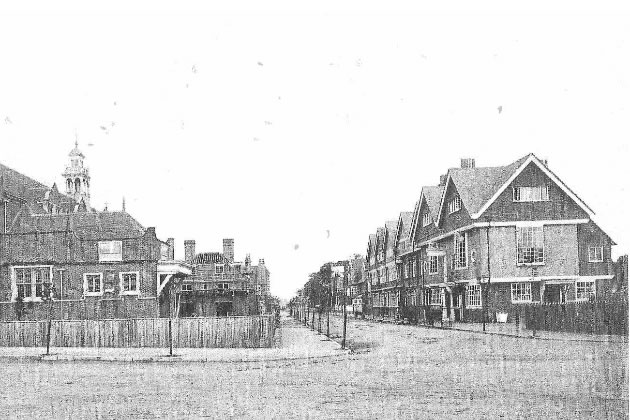
1881 photograph by Bedford Lemere, looking east along Bath Road. The Vicarage is still under construction, without a roof; there are as yet no corner shops in front of the Tabard.

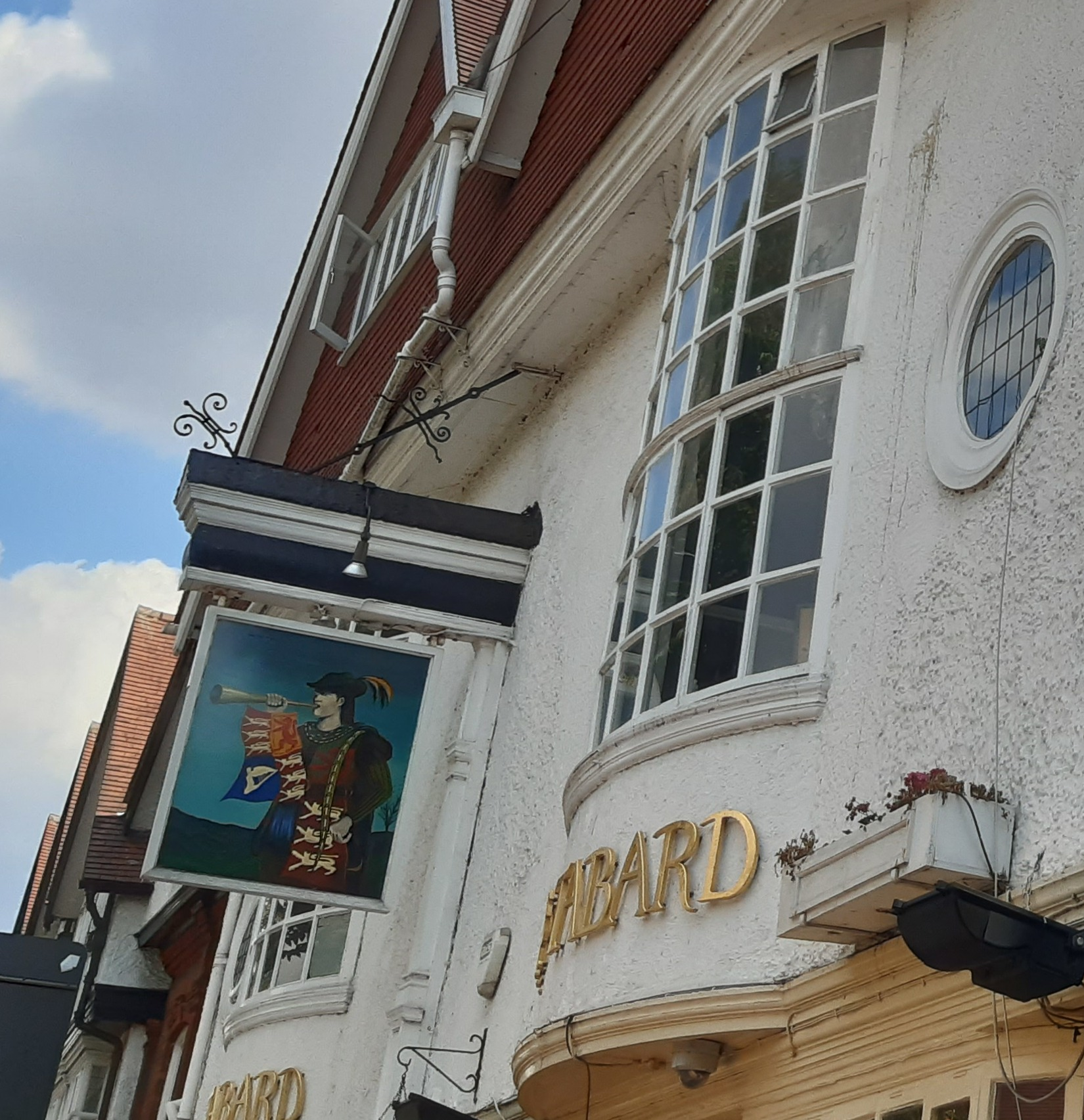
Swing sign by TM Rooke, curved bay-windows

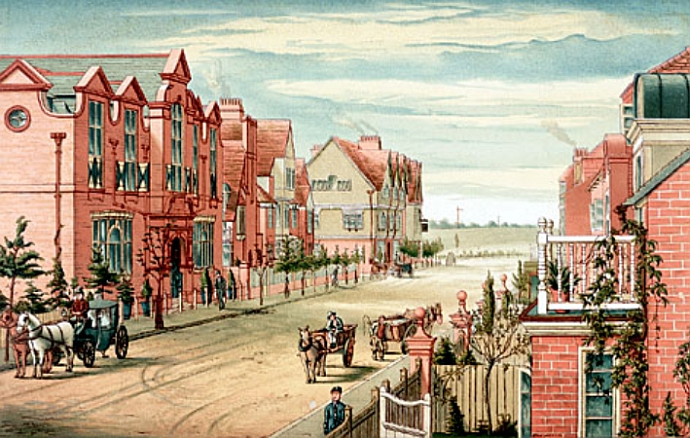
School of Art, Stores and Tabard Inn by Thomas Erat Harrison, 1882

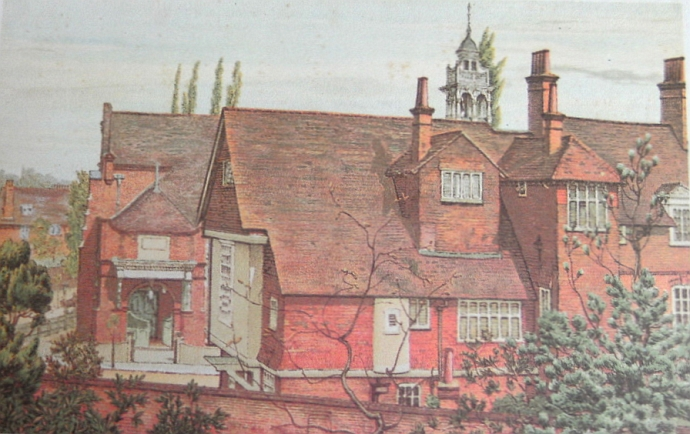
Tabard Inn and St Michael and All Angels Church by Thomas Matthews Rooke, c. 1895. The view (now blocked) is from the south.

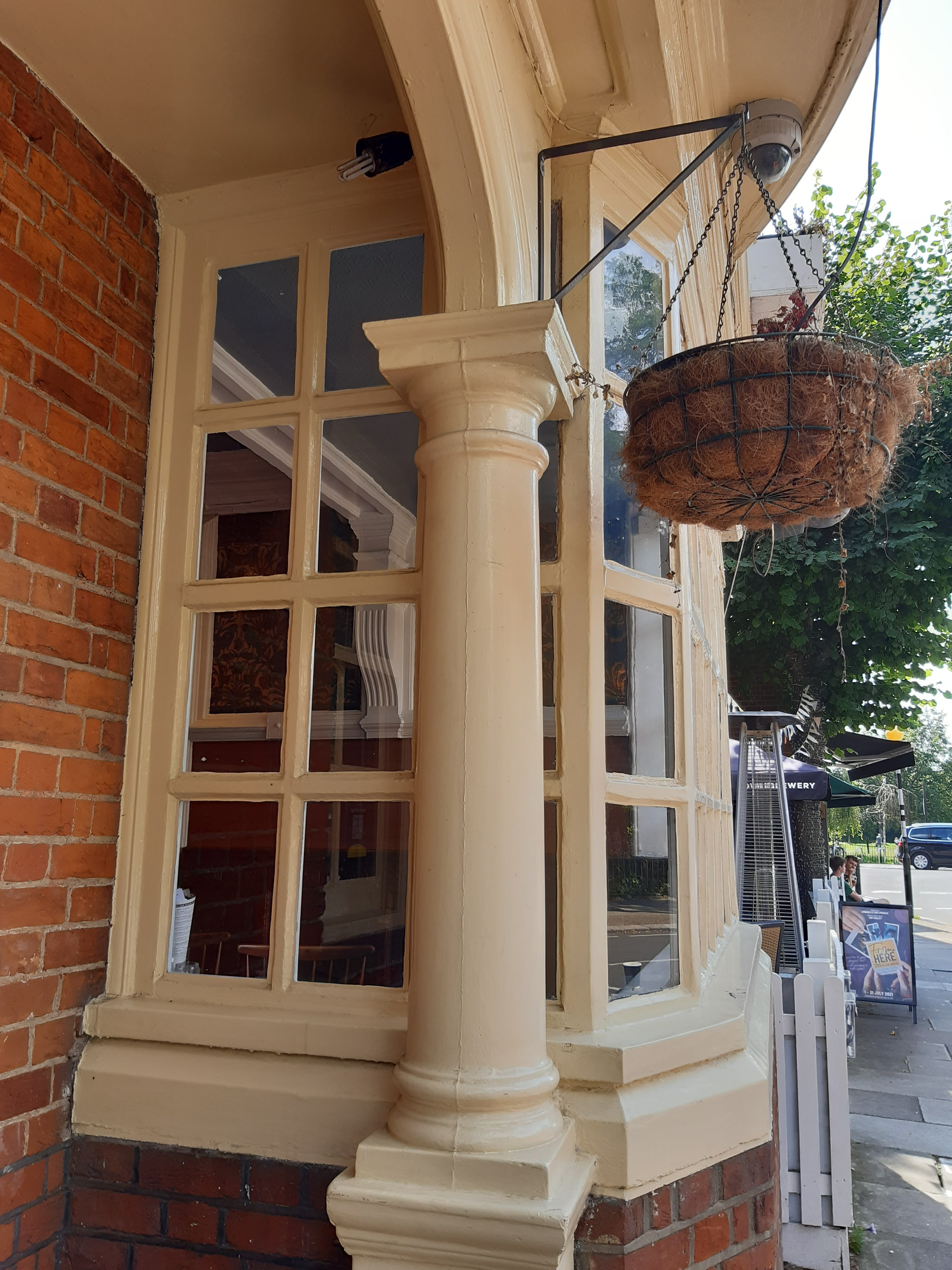
Front window and column

==== House ====
The central house is of red brick on ground and first floors, contrasting with the pub. The four windows on the first floor are separated by Doric pilasters of red brick. Its gables are roughcast.

==== Stores ====
The stores has three wide projecting shop-windows of many panes occupying most of its front face, above a red brick wall containing two lunettes for the basement; the front door is set in the middle window. The roughcast first floor has wide projecting 'Ipswich' pattern oriel windows, supported on wooden brackets. The second floor, also roughcast, projects strongly; each bay has a seven-light window, the centre light larger than the rest and arched.

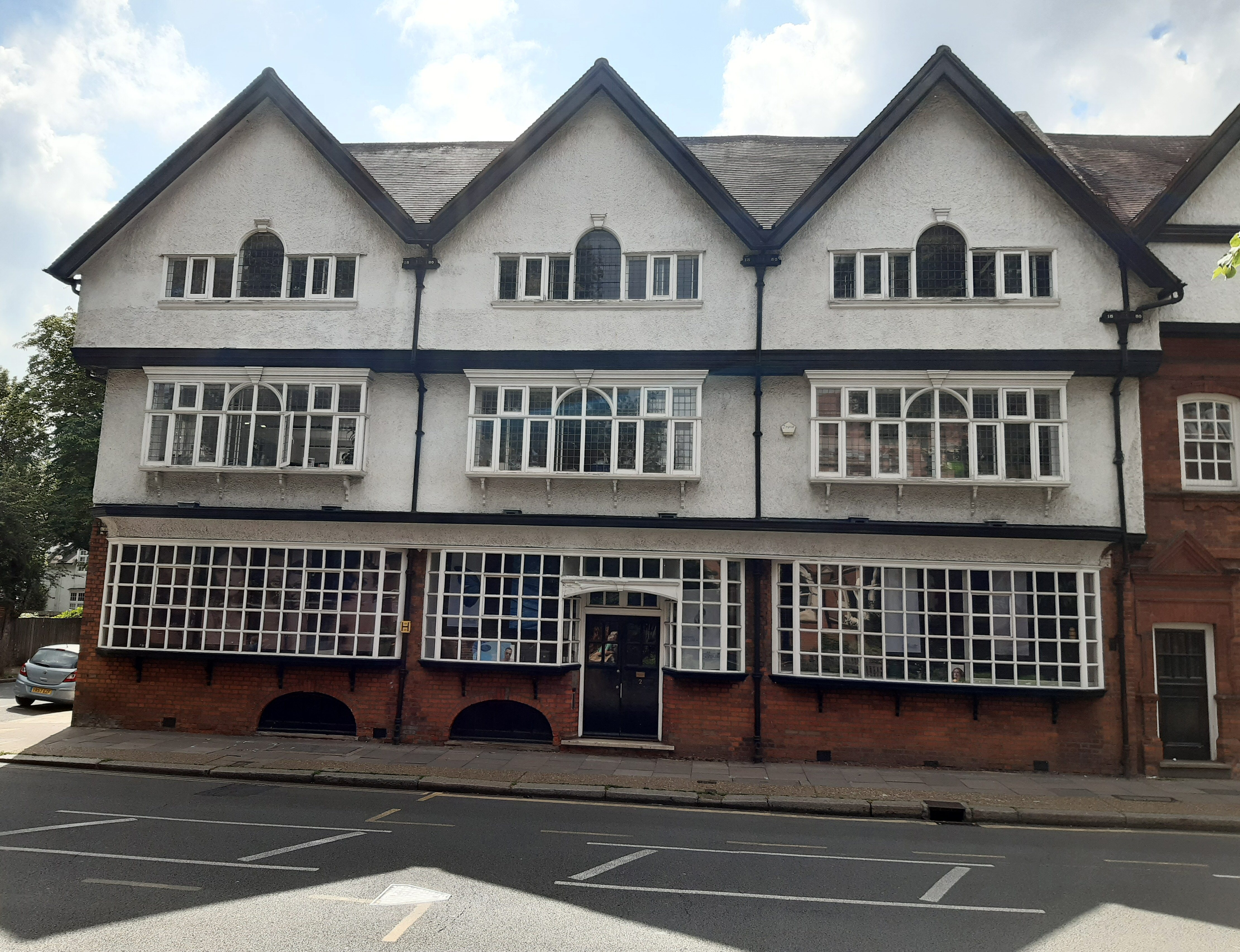
Bedford Park Stores, front on to Bath Road

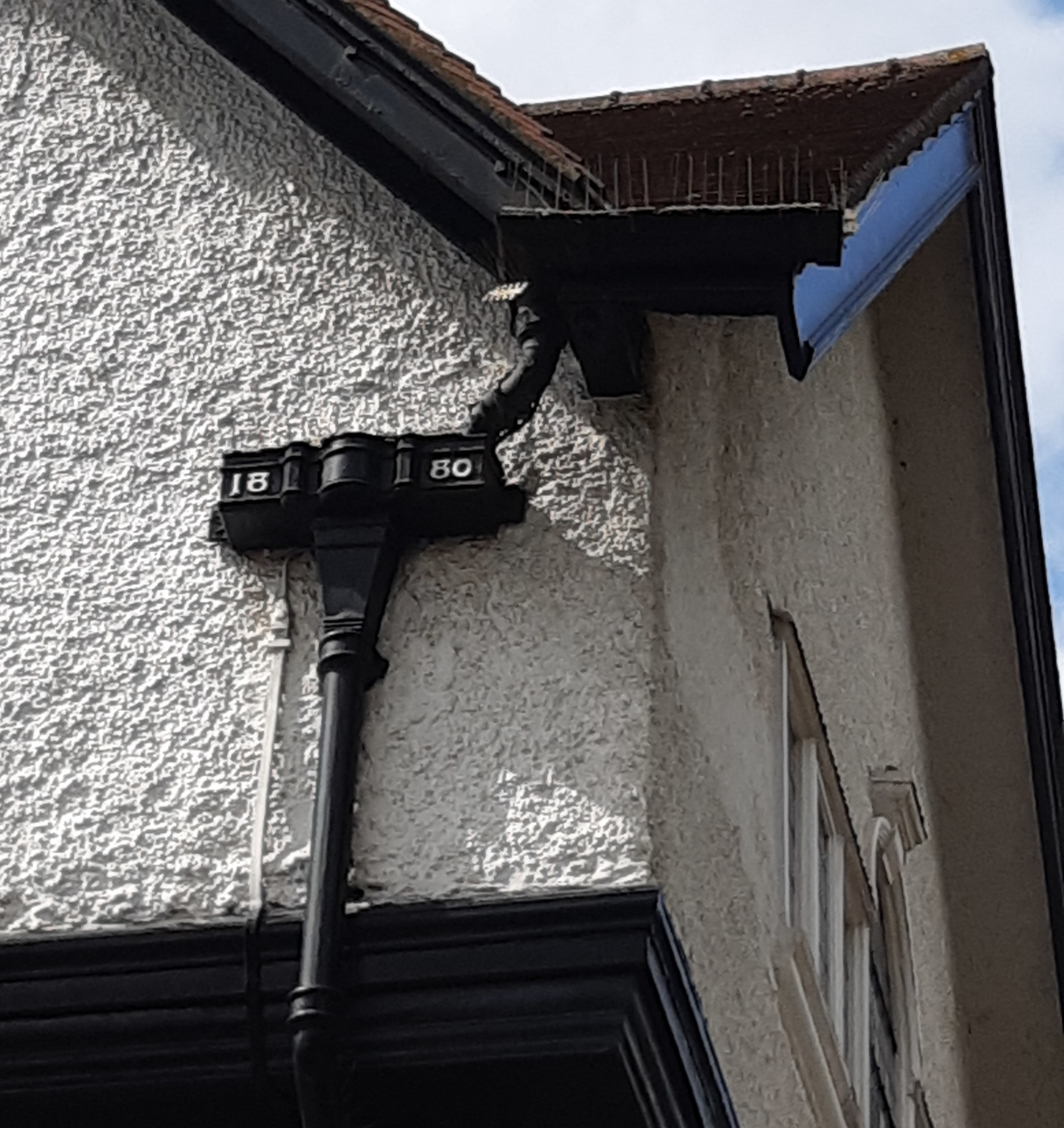
'1880' drainbox

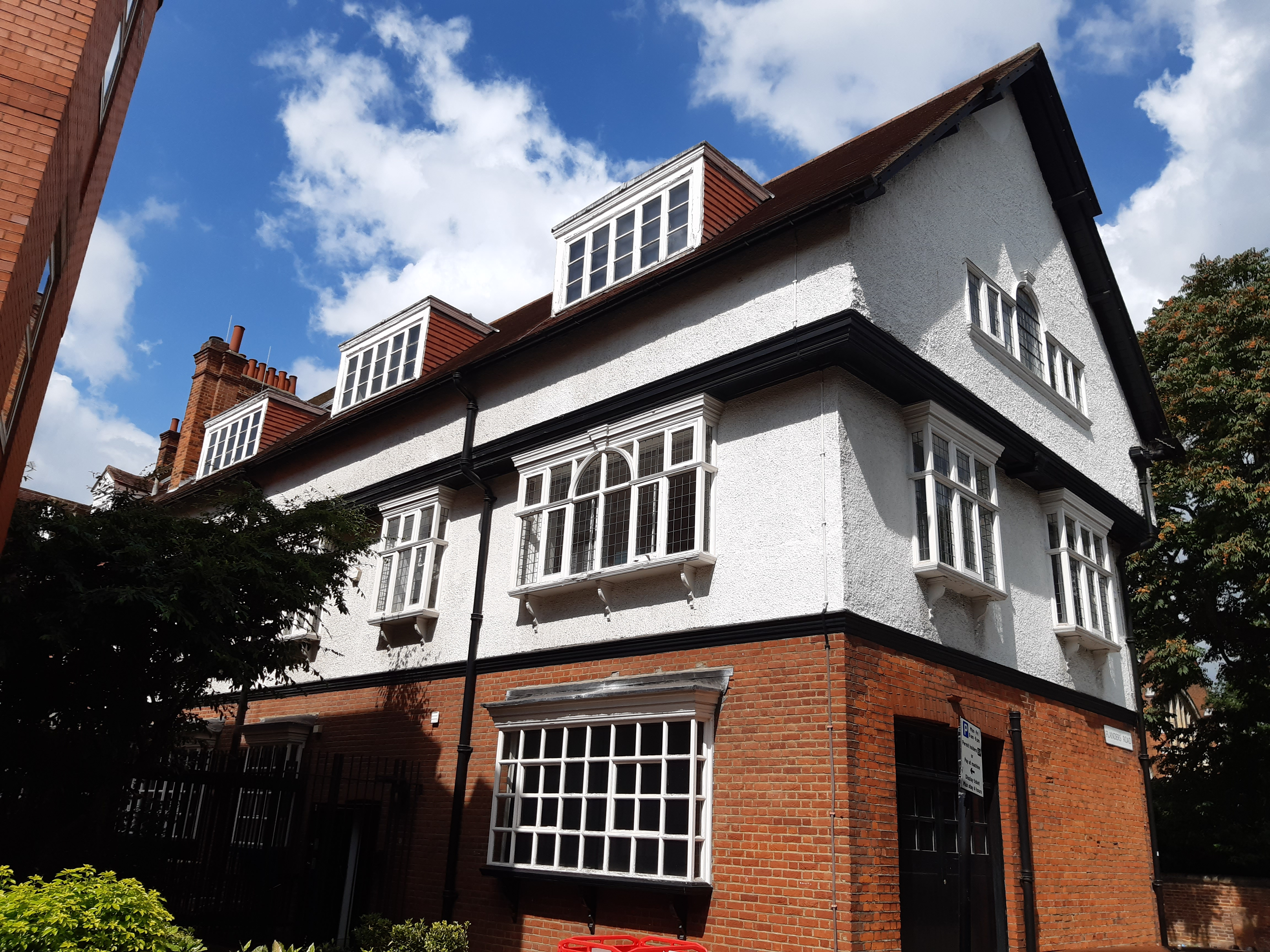
Rear, corner view from Flanders Road

=== Pub interior ===
On the ground floor of The Tabard are the original Arts and Crafts tiling by William De Morgan and the tiled early Art Nouveau fireplace surrounds by Walter Crane. There are moulded door and window surrounds, dado rails, and a window seat. The chimneypieces are bolection-moulded and nursery rhyme tiling. The bar counter is of panelled wood with a metal footrest. The pub has been extended to take in the ground floor of the manager's house to the east. This consists of two rooms, the lower part of their walls up to the dado rail panelled with tongue-and-groove timber.

The first floor (now the theatre) is accessed by a staircase in the courtyard, again panelled up to the dado rail.

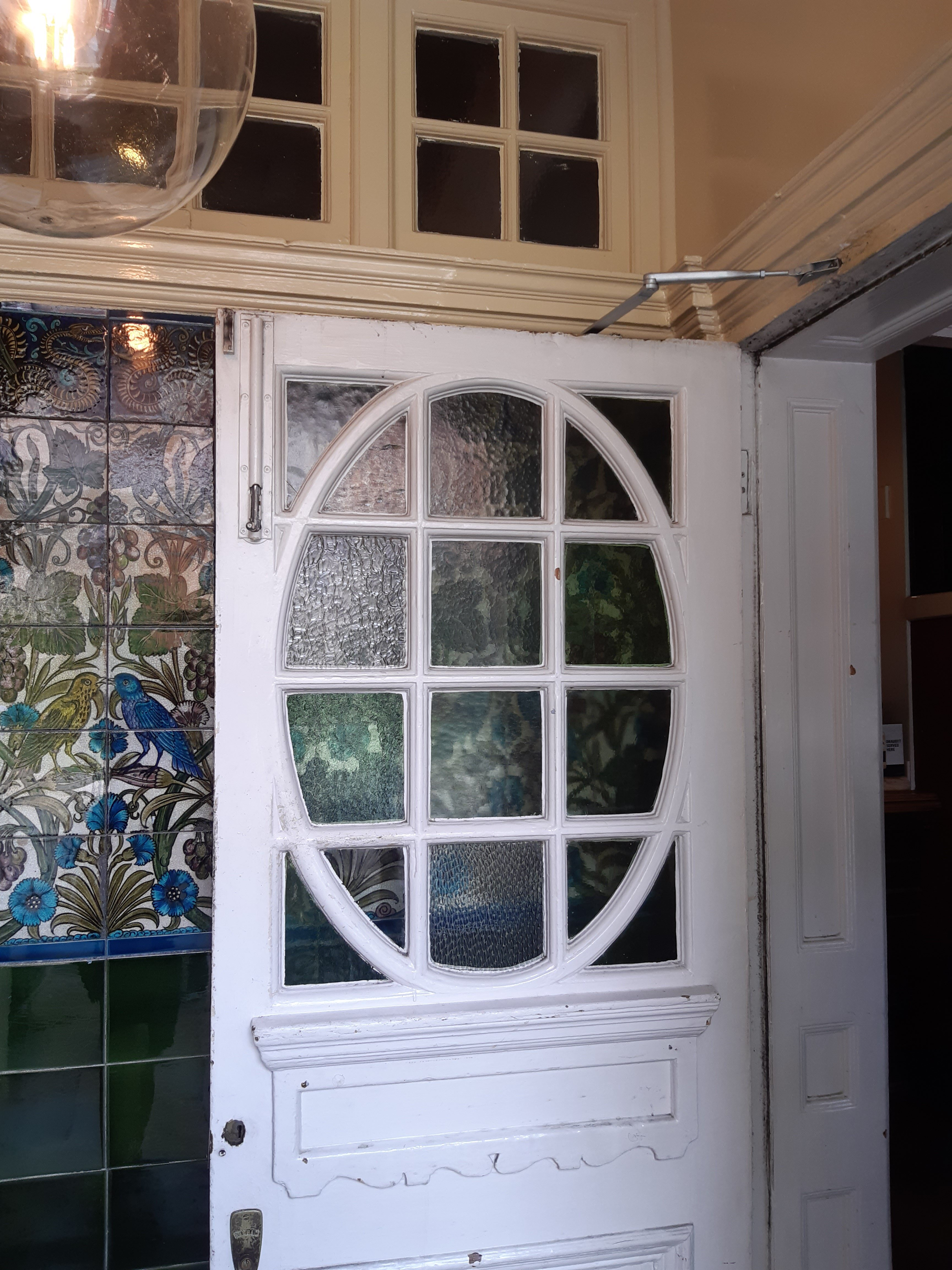
Tiled entrance

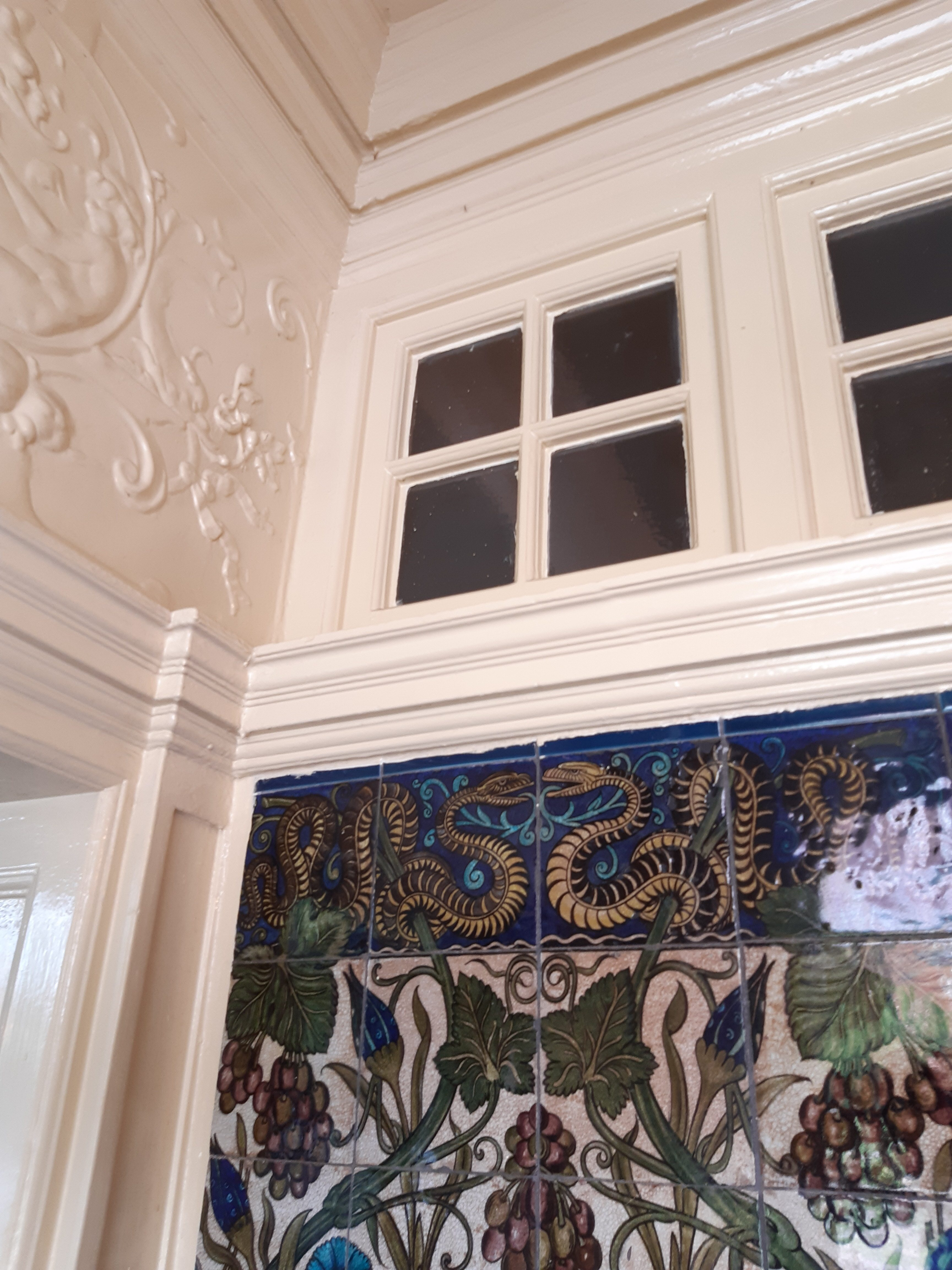
Entrance tiles - ornamental plasterwork

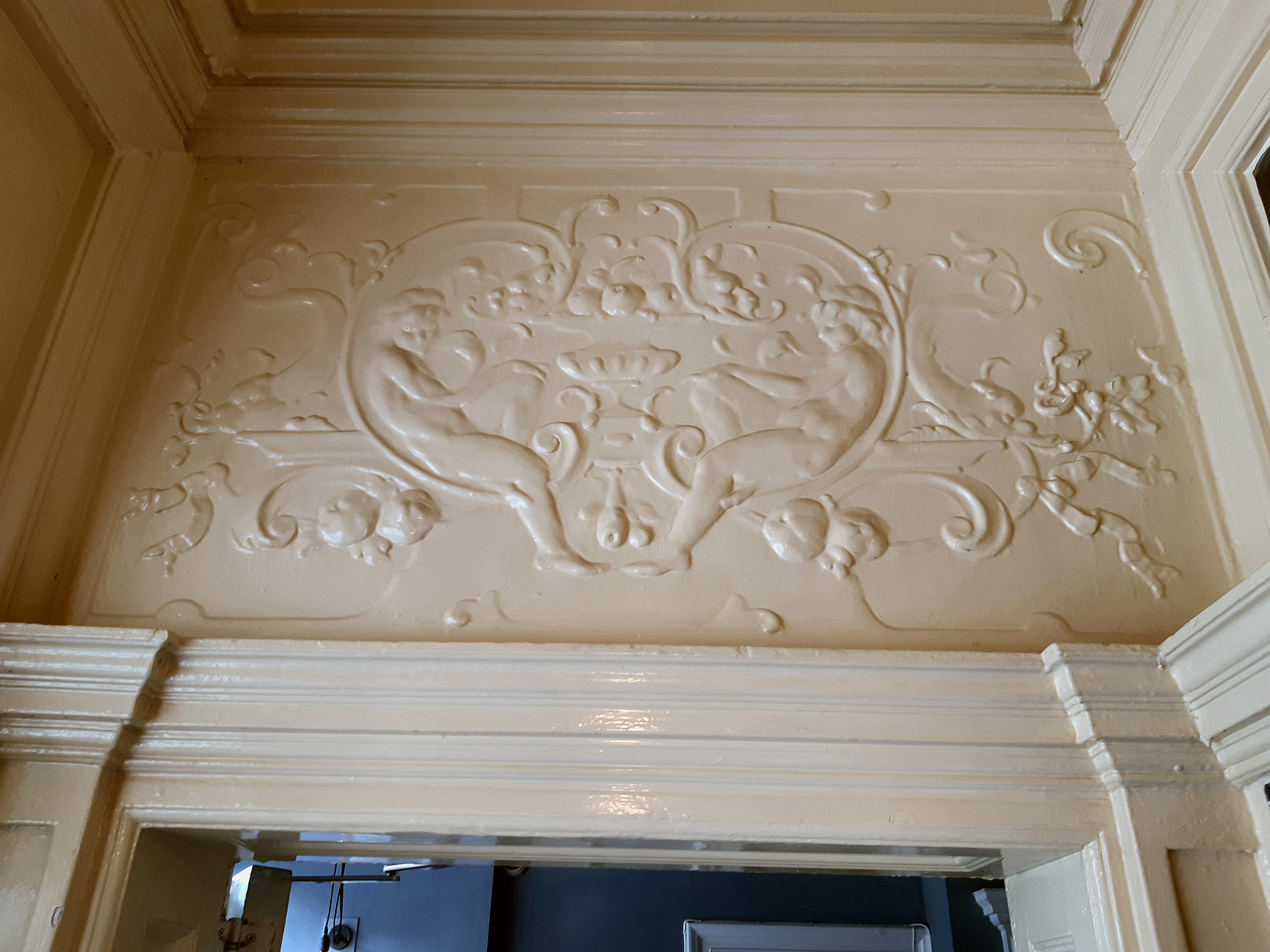
Entrance ornamental plasterwork

The poet and campaigner for Victorian era buildings John Betjeman wrote that The Tabard was a place where "men could play the clavichord to ladies in tussore dresses and where supporters of William Morris could learn of early Socialism".

== Usage ==
The pub is now managed by Greene King; before that it was managed by Punch Taverns and Spirit Pub Company under its Taylor Walker Pubs brand.

On the first floor is the Tabard Theatre, an intimate fringe theatre which as well as putting on productions of plays has hosted comedians such as Al Murray, Harry Hill and Russell Brand.

The Bedford Park Stores building is now used as offices.
