= Thomas Matthews Rooke =

British watercolourist (1842–1942)

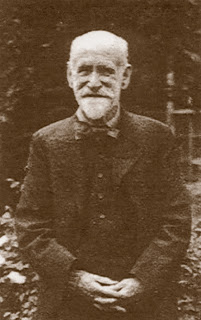

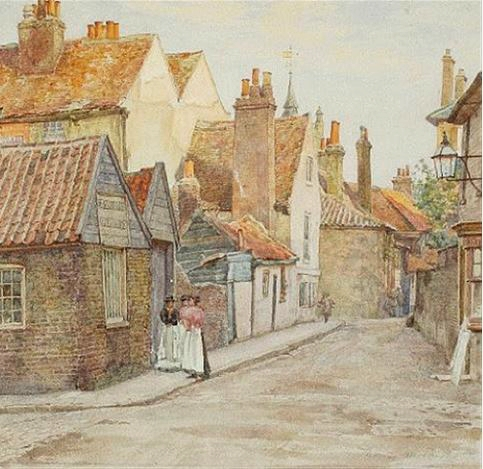
A Vanished Corner of Old Chiswick, 1896

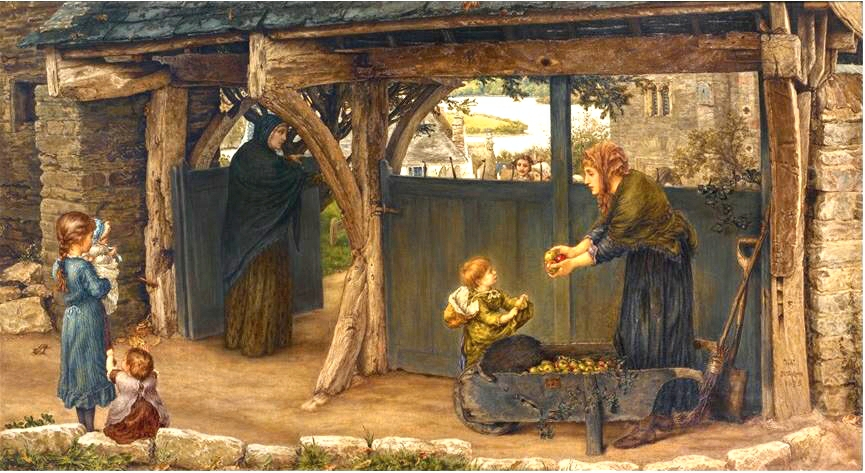
The Lychgate, 1873

Thomas Matthews Rooke (1842, London – 1942, London) was a British watercolourist. He worked as a designer, as an assistant to other artists, and was commissioned by John Ruskin to make architectural drawings.

== Life ==
Ruskin hired Rooke from Morris & Co. in 1879, and was still paying him eight years later. In 1884 he was painting Italian architecture. Ruskin's project aimed to record threatened landscapes and buildings, and for it he also employed Frank Randal (1852–1917), and half a dozen others.

In parallel Rooke was a studio assistant to Edward Burne-Jones, during the period 1868 to 1898. He also did work for Sydney Cockerell and the Society for the Protection of Ancient Buildings; and exhibited at the Royal Academy and Grosvenor Gallery. He contributed a painting to an 1882 book Bedford Park, celebrating the then-fashionable garden suburb of that name.

== Family ==
Rooke married Leonora Jane Jones; the wood-engraver Noel Rooke was their son.
