= Acton Green, London =

Neighbourhood in West London, England

Coordinates: 51°30′00″N 00°15′54″W

Acton Green
- Suburb
- Location within Greater London
- OS grid reference: TQ205805
  - Charing Cross: 5.9 mi (9.5 km) WNW
- London borough: Ealing
- Ceremonial county: Greater London
- Region: London
- Country: England
- Sovereign state: United Kingdom
- Post town: LONDON
- Postcode district: W4
- Dialling code: 020
- Police: Metropolitan
- Fire: London
- Ambulance: London
- UK Parliament: Ealing Central and Acton
- London Assembly: Ealing and Hillingdon

Acton Green is a residential neighbourhood in Chiswick and the London Borough of Ealing, in West London, England. It is named for the nearby Acton Green common. It was once home to many small laundries and was accordingly known as "Soapsuds Island".

== History ==
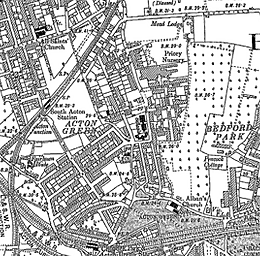
Acton Green on the Ordnance Survey map of 1894

The public parkland of Acton Green common adjoins Chiswick Back Common; before they were divided by the railway embankment for the District and Piccadilly lines, both were part of the English Civil War battlefield of the Battle of Turnham Green.

South Acton, especially the Acton Green district, was once famous for its laundries, and was known as "Soapsuds island". There were some 60 laundries in 1873, rising to over 170 in 1890, most of the washing being done by hand. The 1901 census recorded as laundry workers 568 men and 2,448 women. The number of laundries fell to 50 in 1956, by then all automated: still the largest concentration of such businesses in Britain at that time. The business supported light industries that produced laundry requisites, including baskets, laundry hampers, mangles, washing machines, tubs, and wringers.

Facing the east of the common is St Michael and All Angels, Bedford Park; it and The Tabard Inn facing it across Bath Road, were built in 1880. The 1894 Ordnance Survey map shows Acton Green bounded to the west by railway lines, and to the east by the boundary of Bedford Park; at that time, both the west of Bedford Park and the east of Acton Green consisted of orchards.

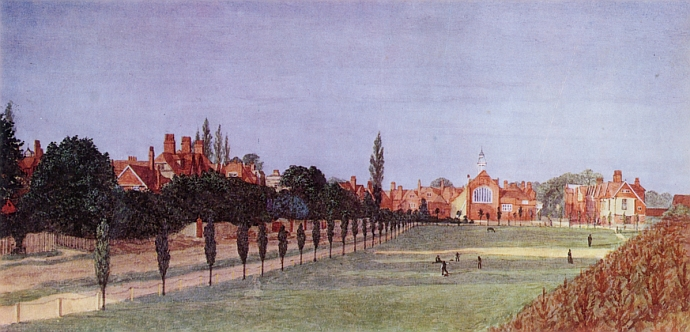
Painting, looking east, of Acton Green common to St Michael's and All Angels and The Tabard Inn by Frederick Hamilton Jackson, 1882. The Victorian era Bedford Park development is on the left, the London Underground railway embankment on the right.

== Housing ==
Most of the housing of Acton Green is to the northwest of the common; to its east is the Bedford Park area, developed speculatively as a place for artists at the same time as St Michael's and The Tabard. There were formerly numerous small shops in the centre of Acton Green on Cunnington Street and Kingswood Road. These included confectioners, fish and chip shops, grocers, and off-licences. The area also held a variety of schools, now all closed.

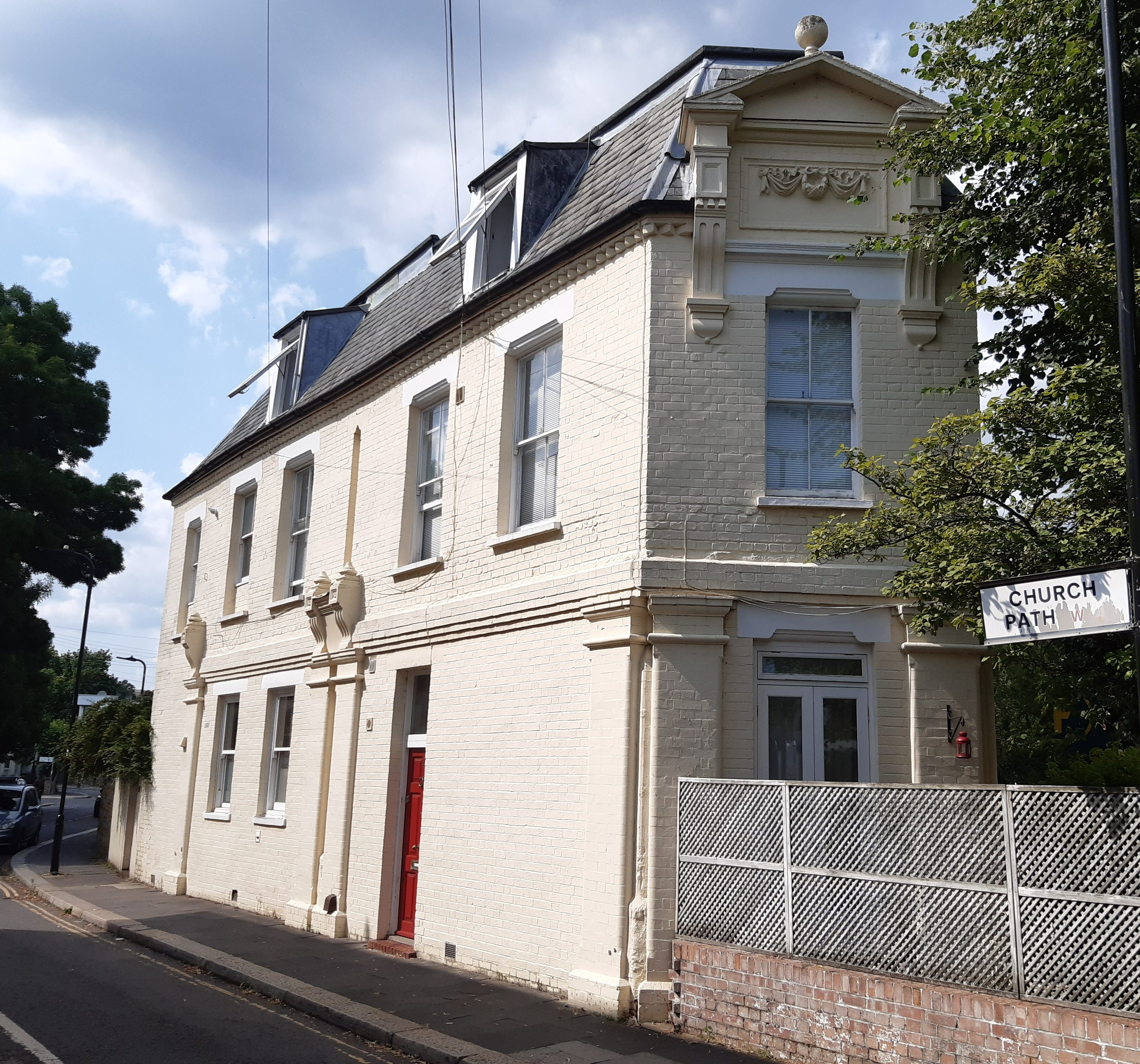
A corner house with end pediment and swag,
Church Path

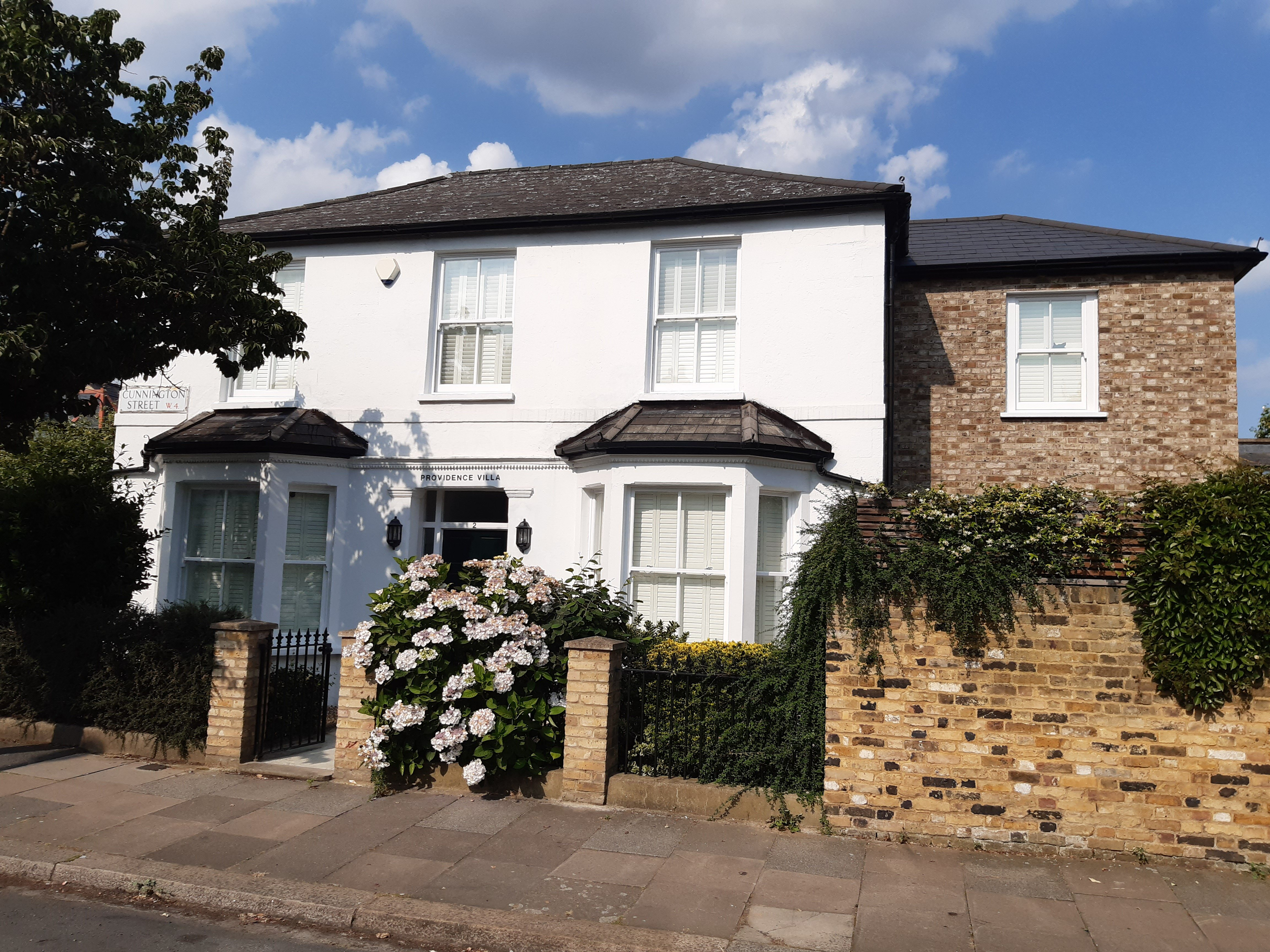
Providence Villa,
Cunnington Street

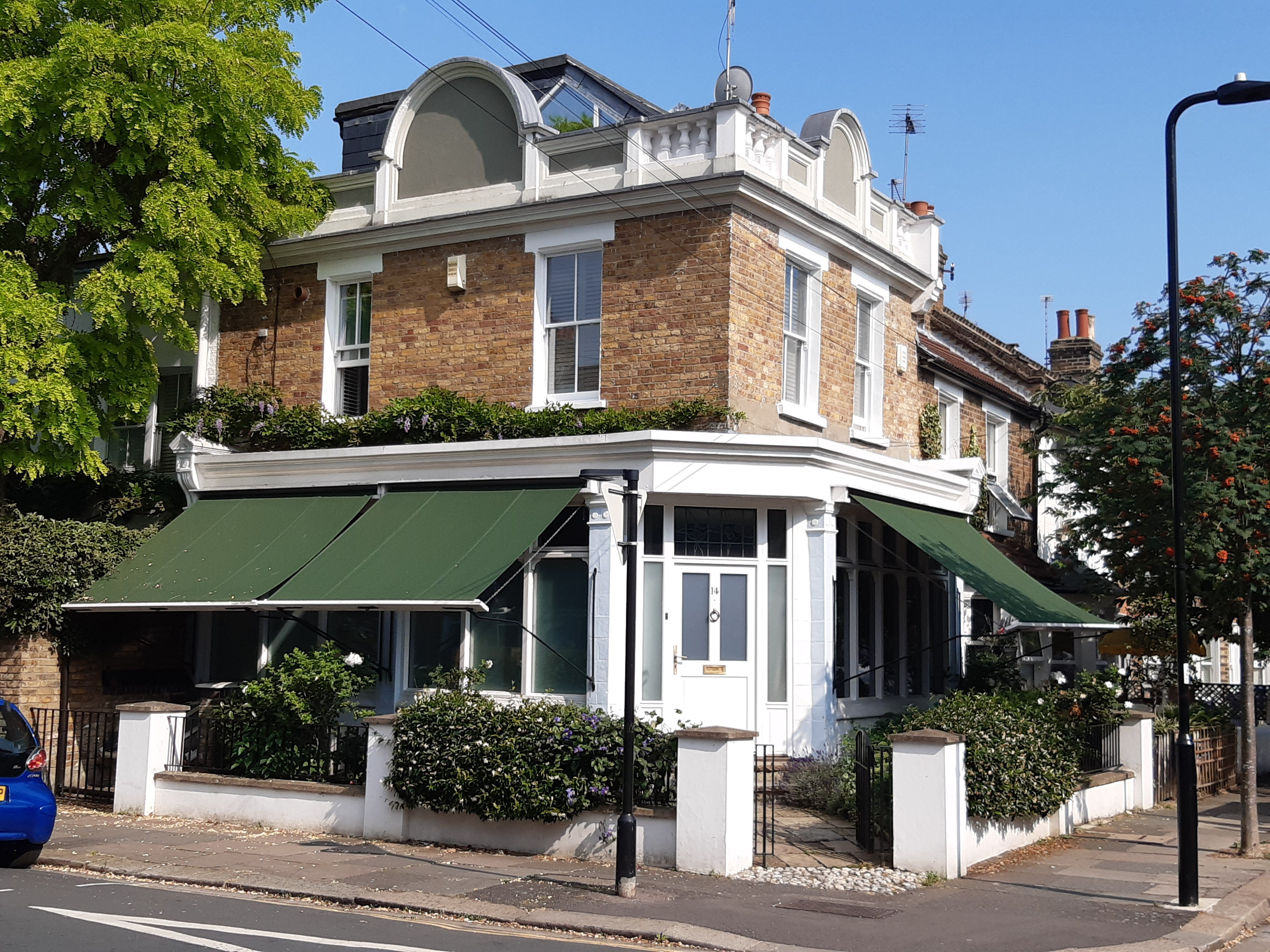
A former corner shop,
Antrobus Road

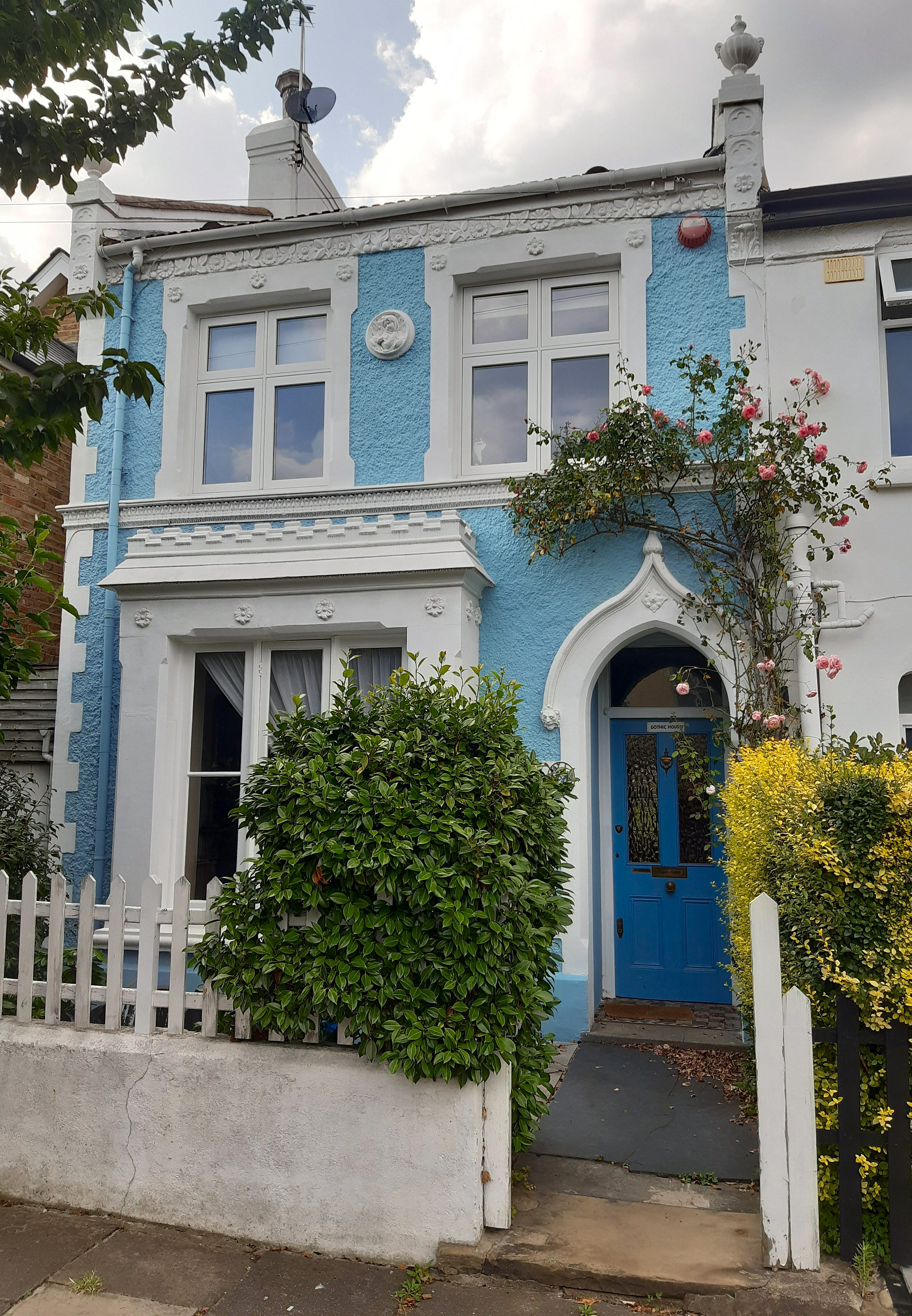
The Gothic House,
Rothschild Road

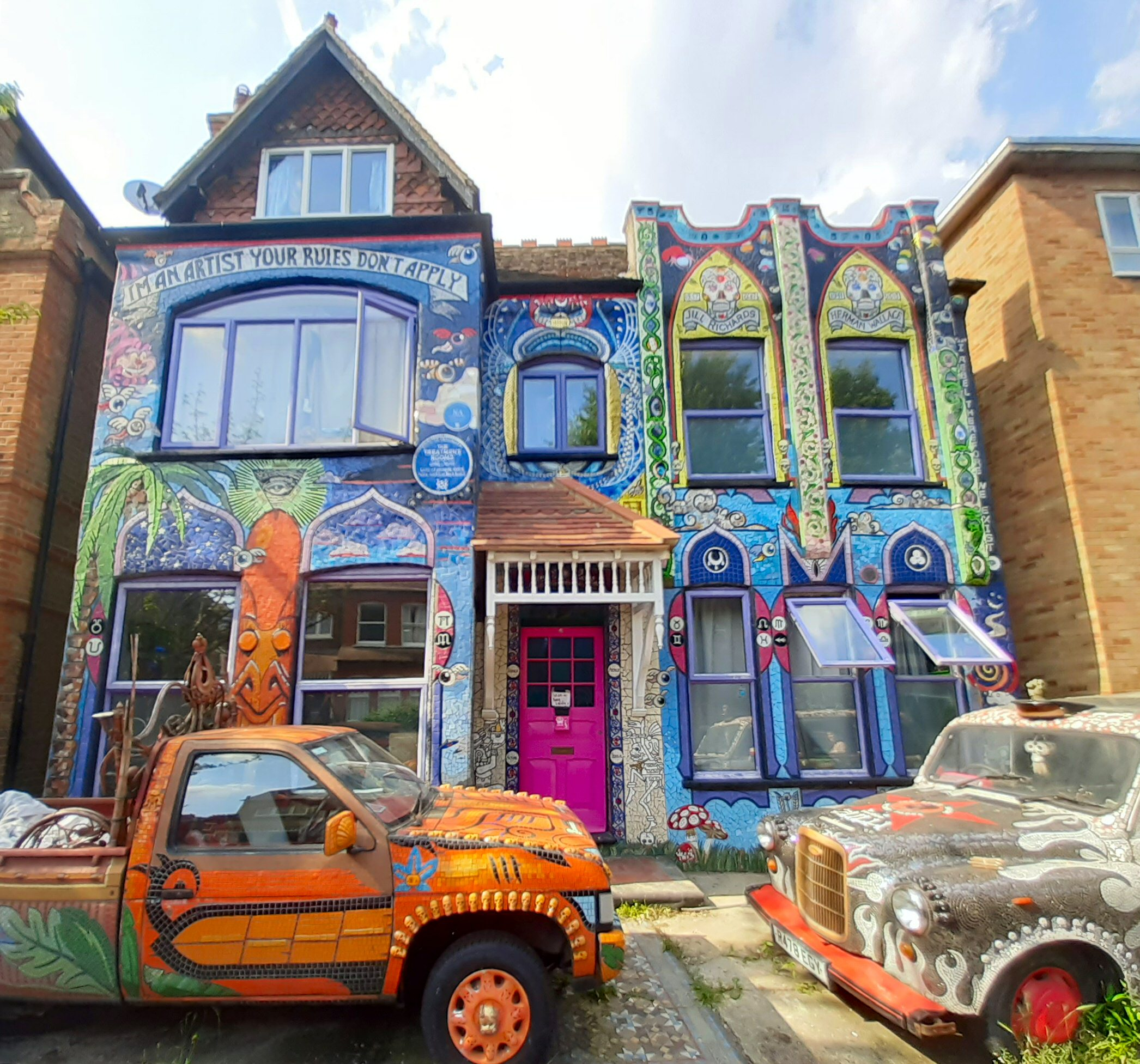
The Mosaic House,
Fairlawn Grove

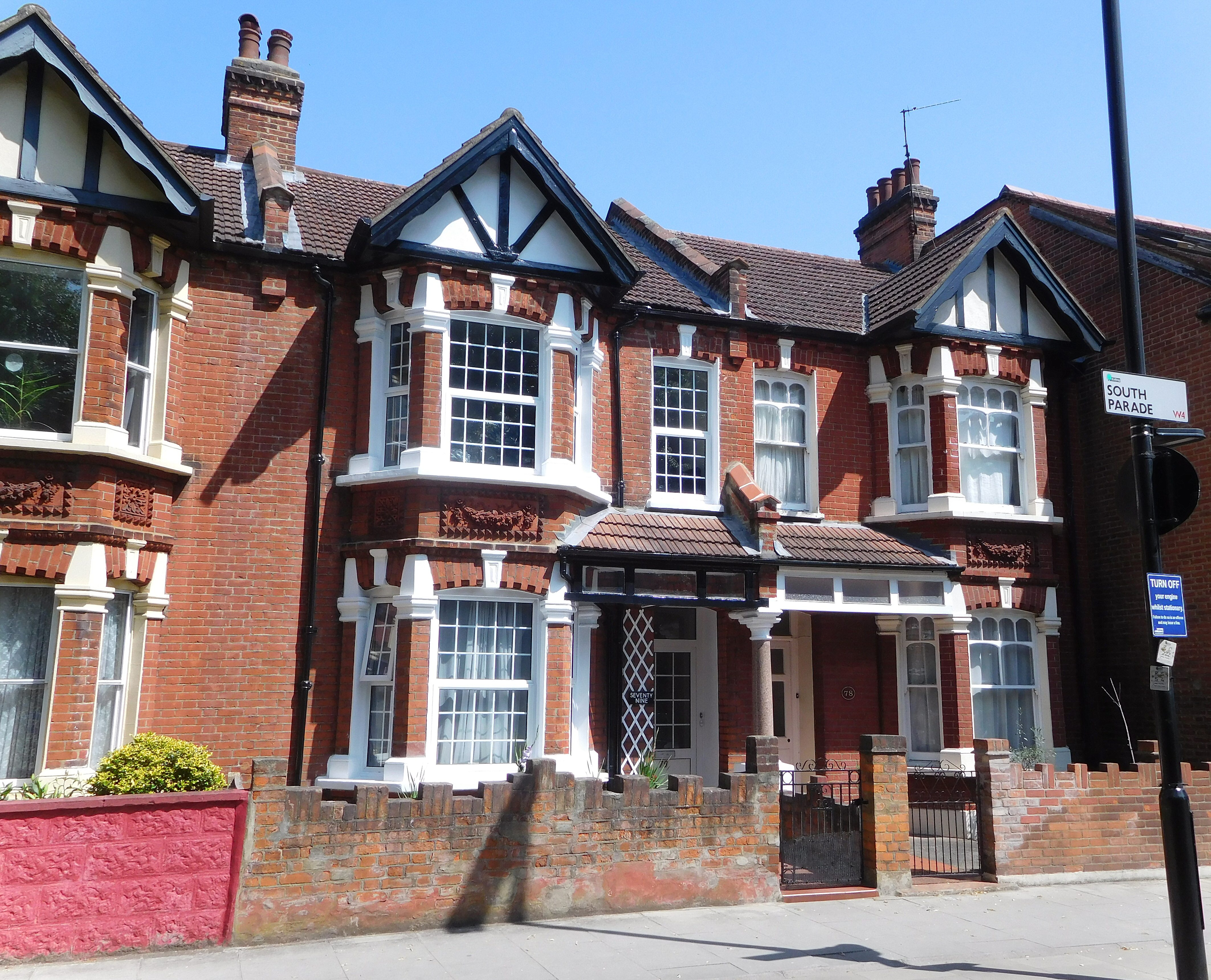
Red brick terraced houses,
South Parade

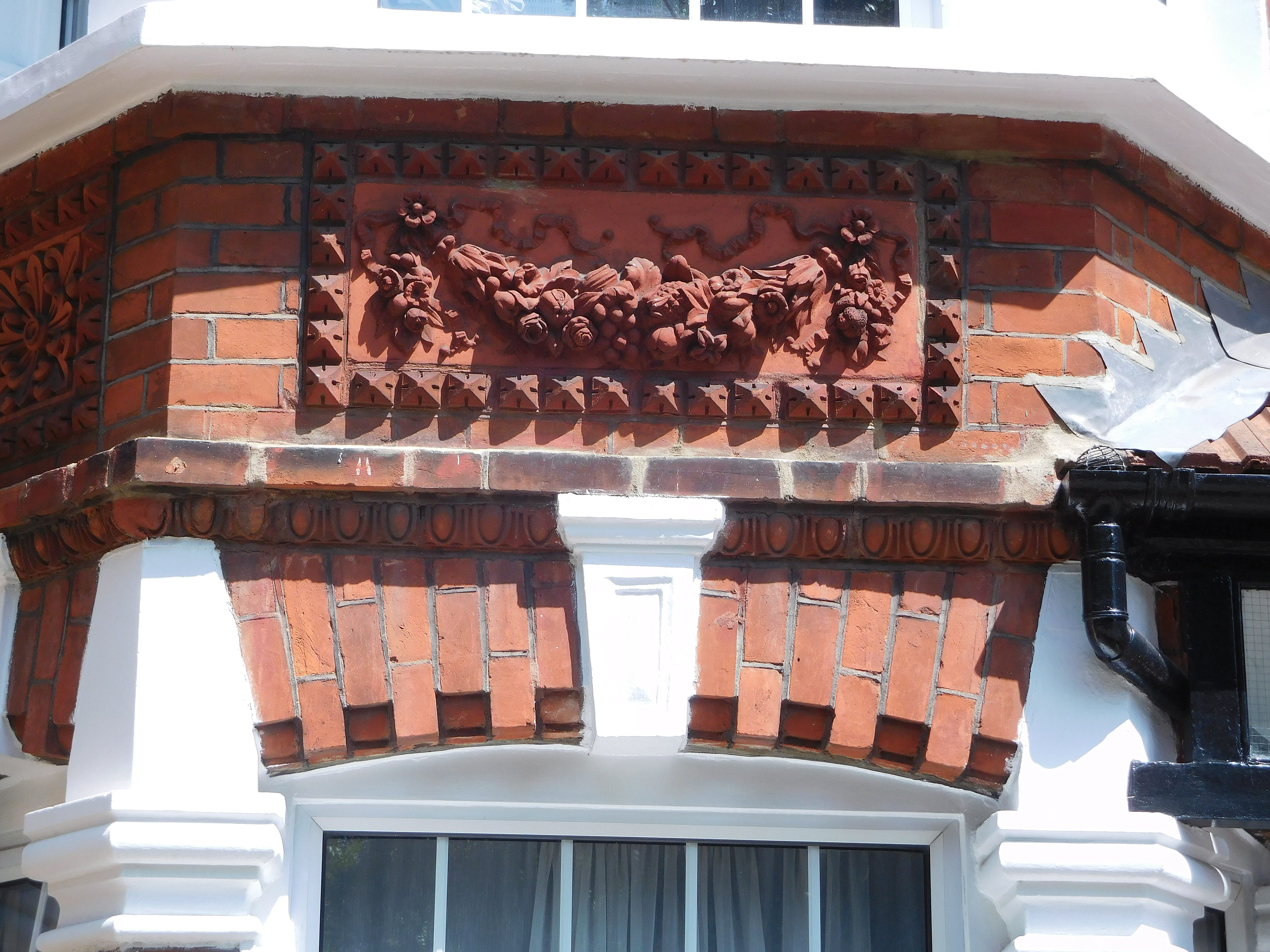
Decorative swag,
South Parade

== St Alban's Church ==
On the north side of the common, facing South Parade, is the red-brick with stone facings neo-Gothic Victorian era St Alban's Church, Acton Green by Edward Monson Jr; it was opened in 1888. It is described as the focus of the Acton Green Conservation area; the church building is Grade II listed. The nearby vicarage uses the same red brick and stone window surrounds and mullions.

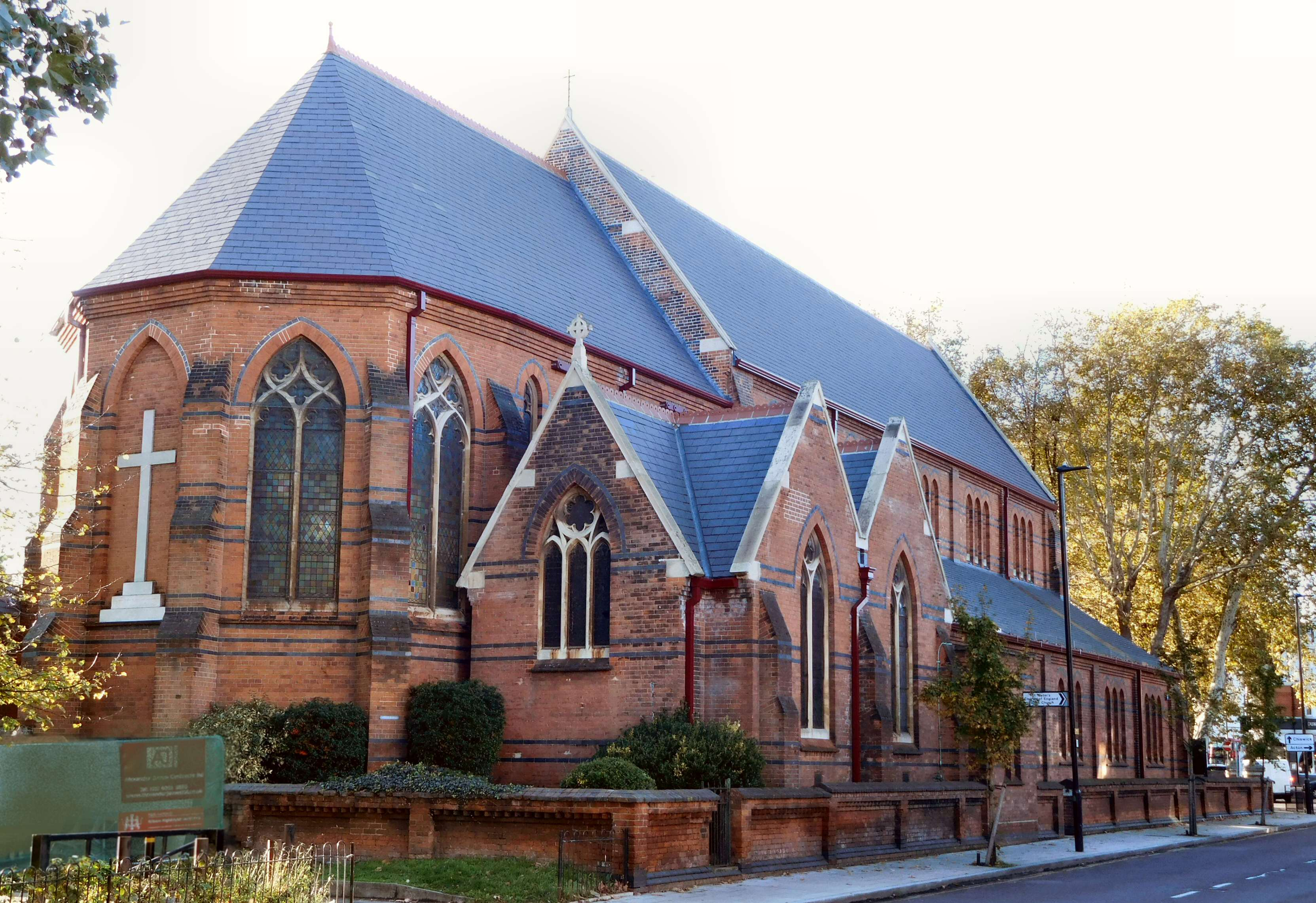
St Alban's Church, opened 1888

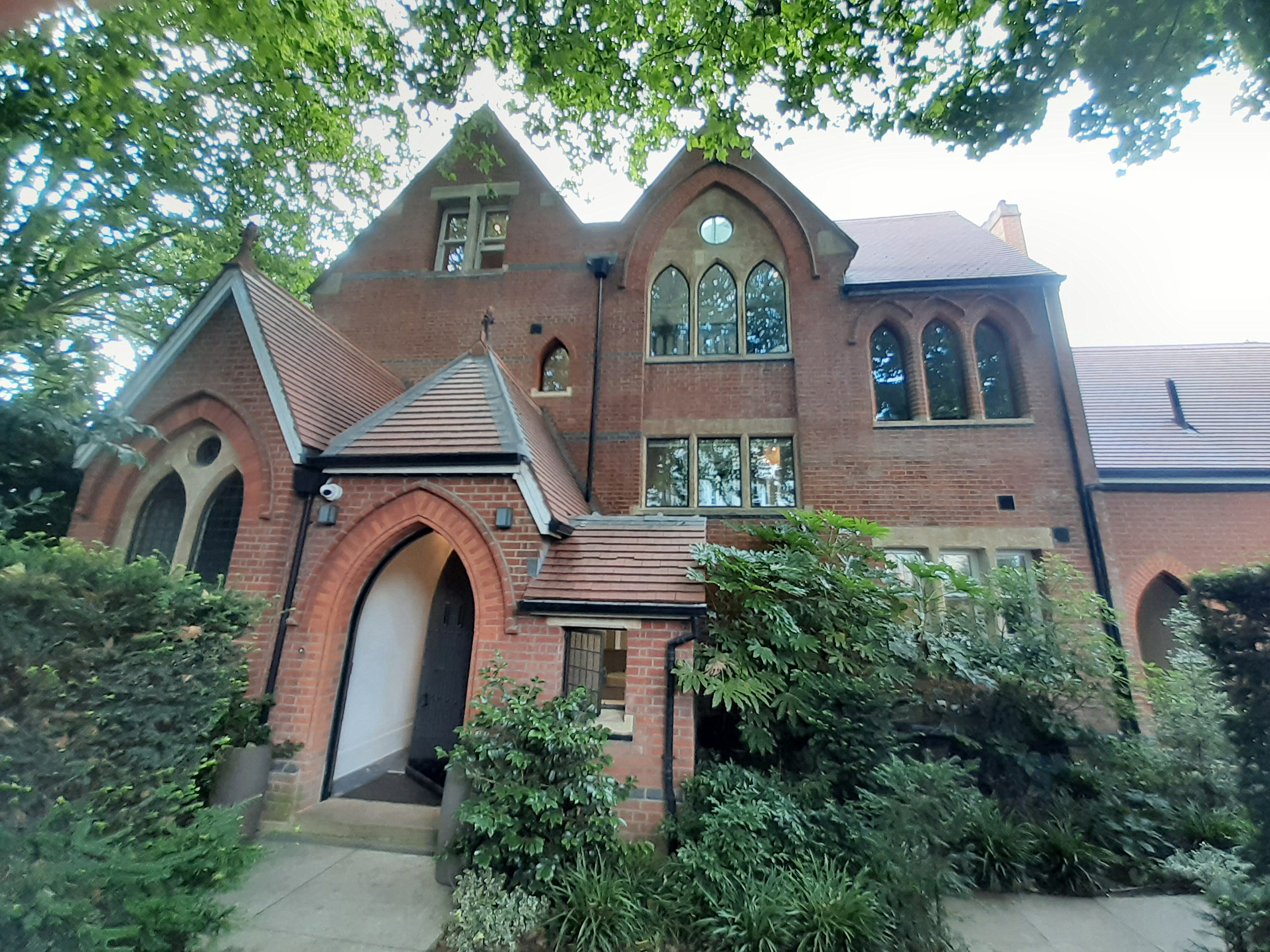
Old Vicarage, South Parade, sharing architectural idioms with its church

== West side of the common ==
Facing the west of the common are the mansion flats of the locally listed four-storey red brick Fairlawn Court, built around 1900. Just to its north are the loft apartments of Chiswick Green Studios, a "modish conversion" of a group of industrial buildings. The buildings from 1930 and 1950 had been the military electronics components factory of Evershed & Vignoles. They were converted to form apartments, including new penthouses through the addition of a curved roof; a third building retained only the original frame and was made into cheaper "loft style" apartments.

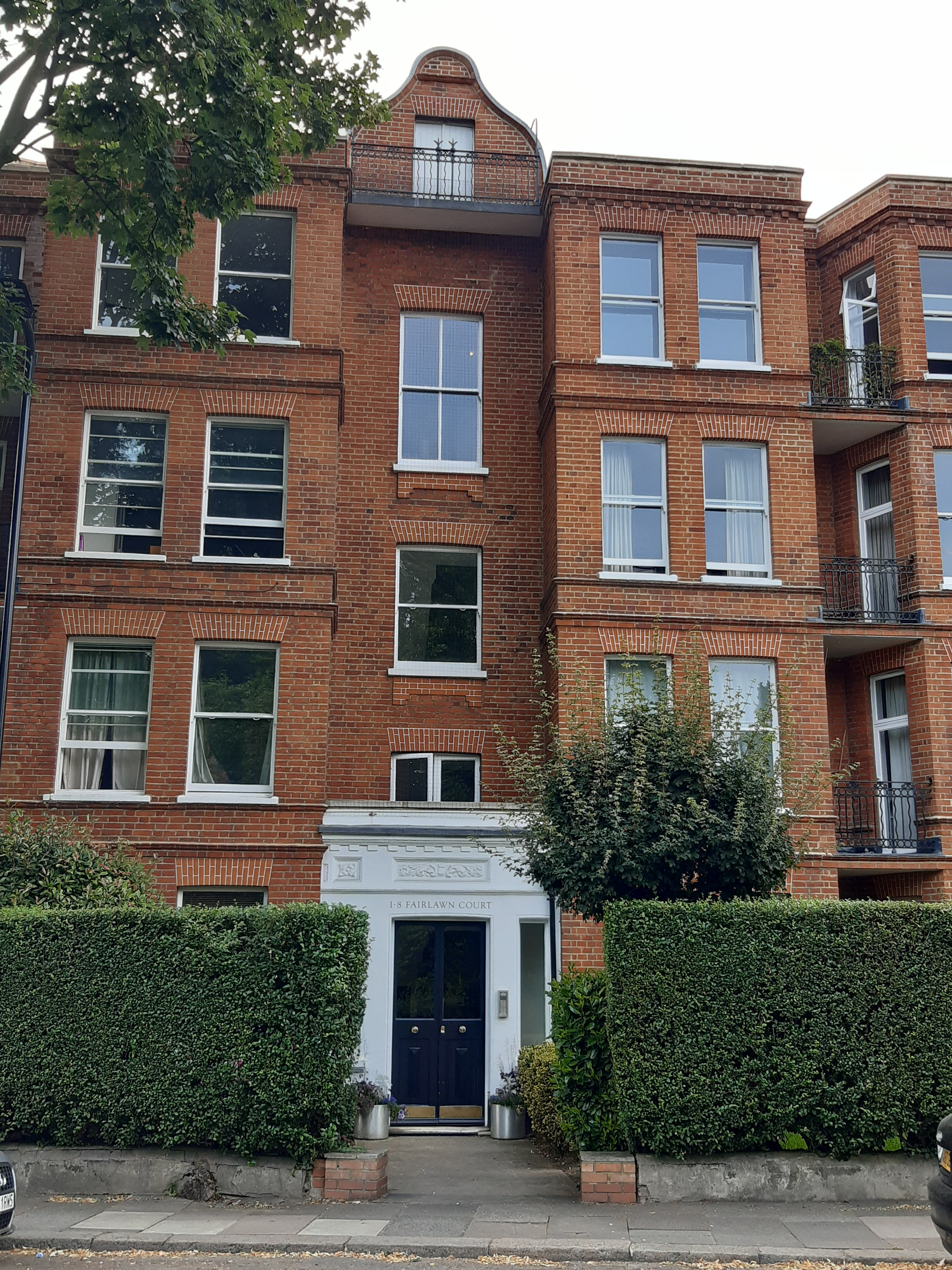
Detail of Fairlawn Court, Acton Lane

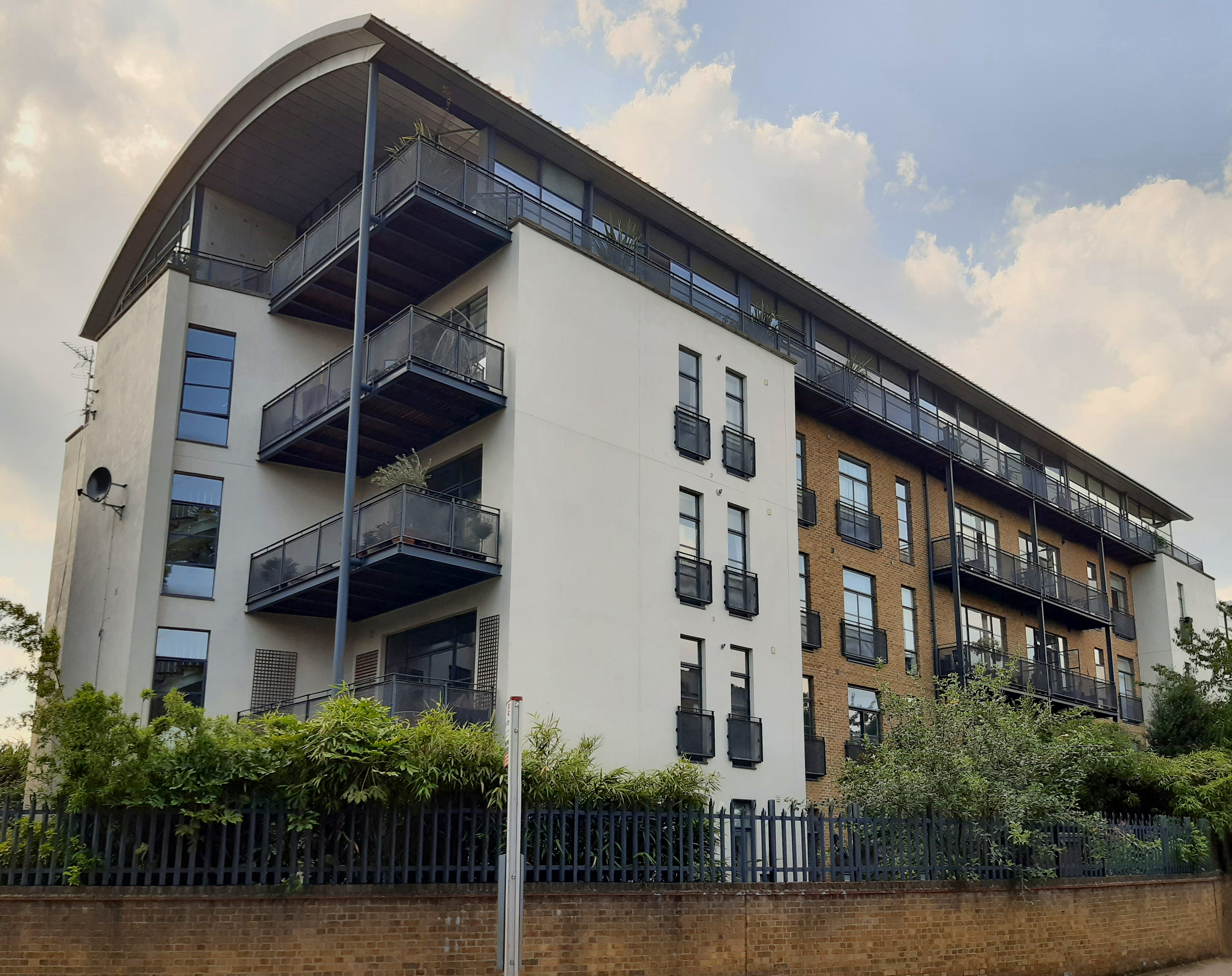
Chiswick Green Studios, formerly an Evershed & Vignoles factory

== Eating and drinking ==
=== Duke of Sussex ===
Nearby, facing the north of the common is the 1898 Duke of Sussex public house; it replaced an earlier beerhouse founded by 1842. The current "elaborately decorated" building was designed by the pub architects Shoebridge & Rising, and is Grade II listed. It has two storeys, with dormer windows for the attic and cellars below. The main front faces east on to Beaconsfield Road, with three bays, two of them with dormers, separated by a small half-round Diocletian window, and the third an extension to house the kitchens and staircase. The walls are covered in white stucco, with the first storey hung with flat red tiles. The first storey and attic windows below the dormers are "Ipswich oriels" under ornamental cornices. The ground floor bar area has big arched windows, and an elaborate corner doorway; the doorway to the north is adorned with ornamental ironwork. Parts of the original interior partitioning survive, providing "an unusually rich, turn-of-the-century pub interior".

Duke of Sussex public house, 1898

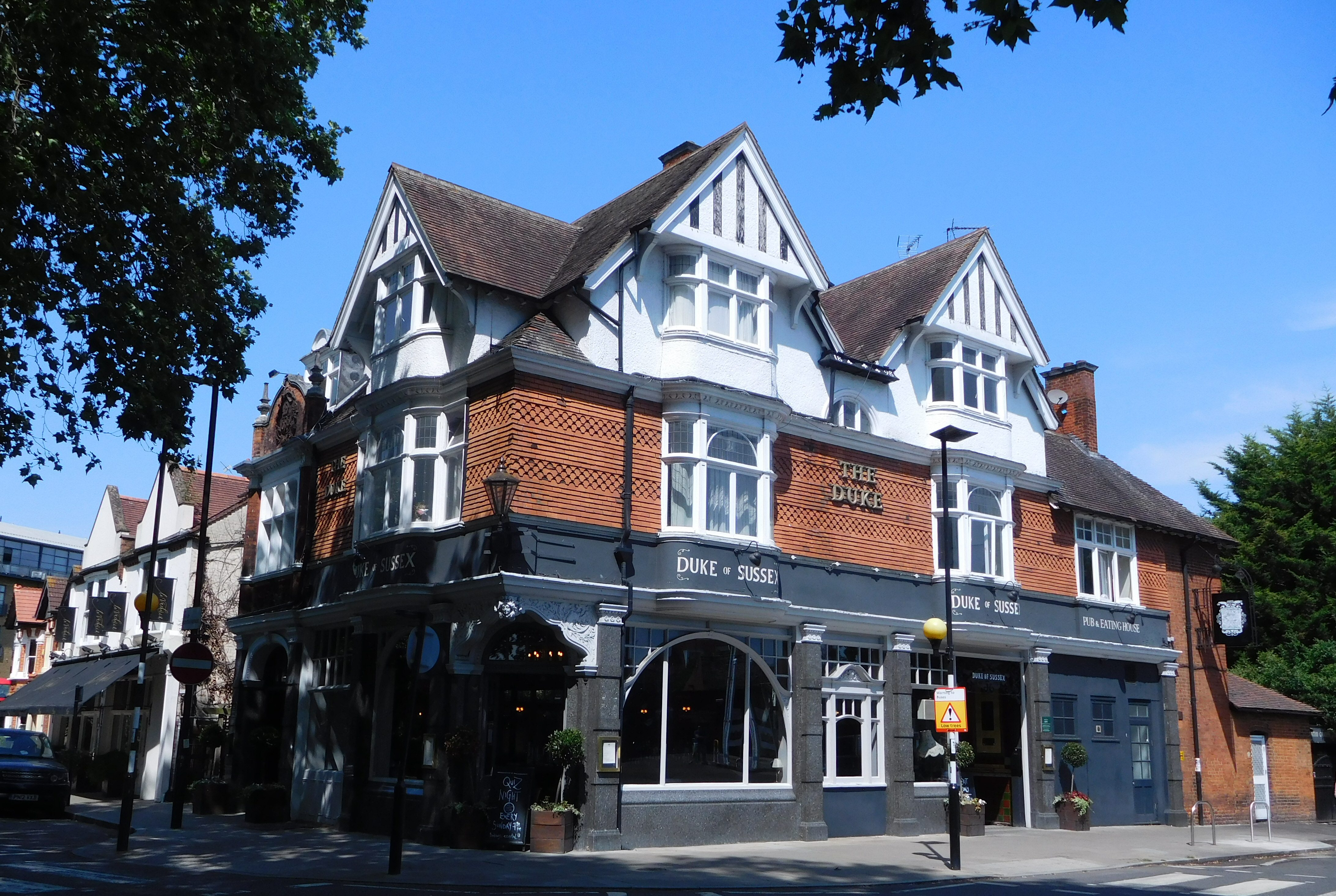
Exterior

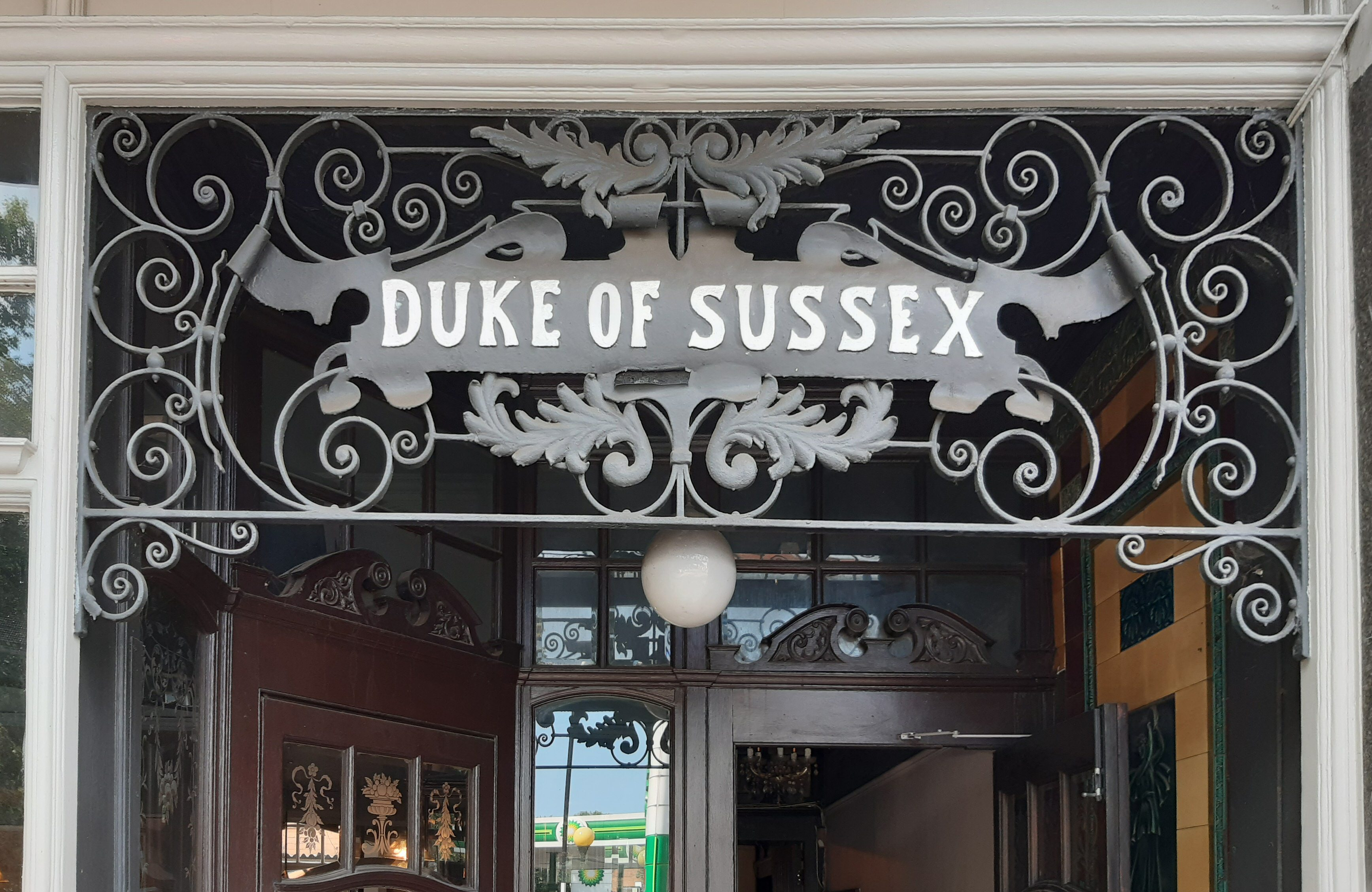
Ornamental ironwork

=== Other ===
Next to the Duke of Sussex was Le Vacherin, a French bistro; it served traditional French cuisine from its foundation by Malcolm John in May 2004 to its closure in June 2026 by Donna Thompson-Smith.

On the corner of Bollo Lane, which marks the western edge of the area, and Montgomery Road is the Bollo, a gastropub. It opened soon after 1900 as 'The Railway Hotel', complete with a painting of a railway locomotive on the outside wall. It then became in turn 'The Railway Tavern', 'The Orange Kipper' (1988), 'The Bollo House', and finally the Bollo.

On the corner of Evershed Walk and Acton Lane is The Swan, opened in 1871 by the Phoenix Brewery of Latimer Road in what had been a beerhouse owned by James Brown. Its exterior featured in a 1980s television situation comedy. It is described by Harden's guide as a "lovely panelled pub" with attractive garden, serving good food.

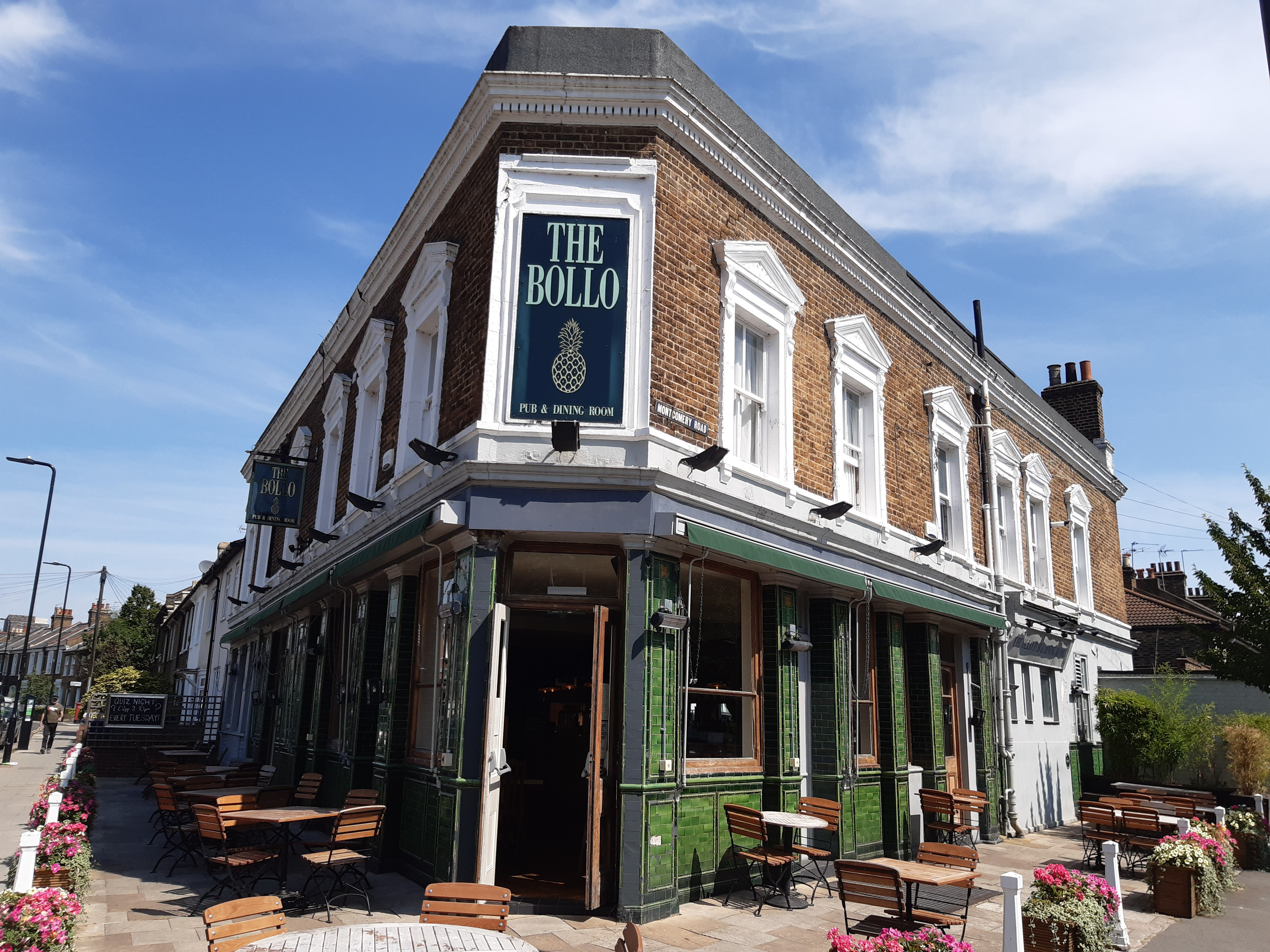
The Bollo, Bollo Lane

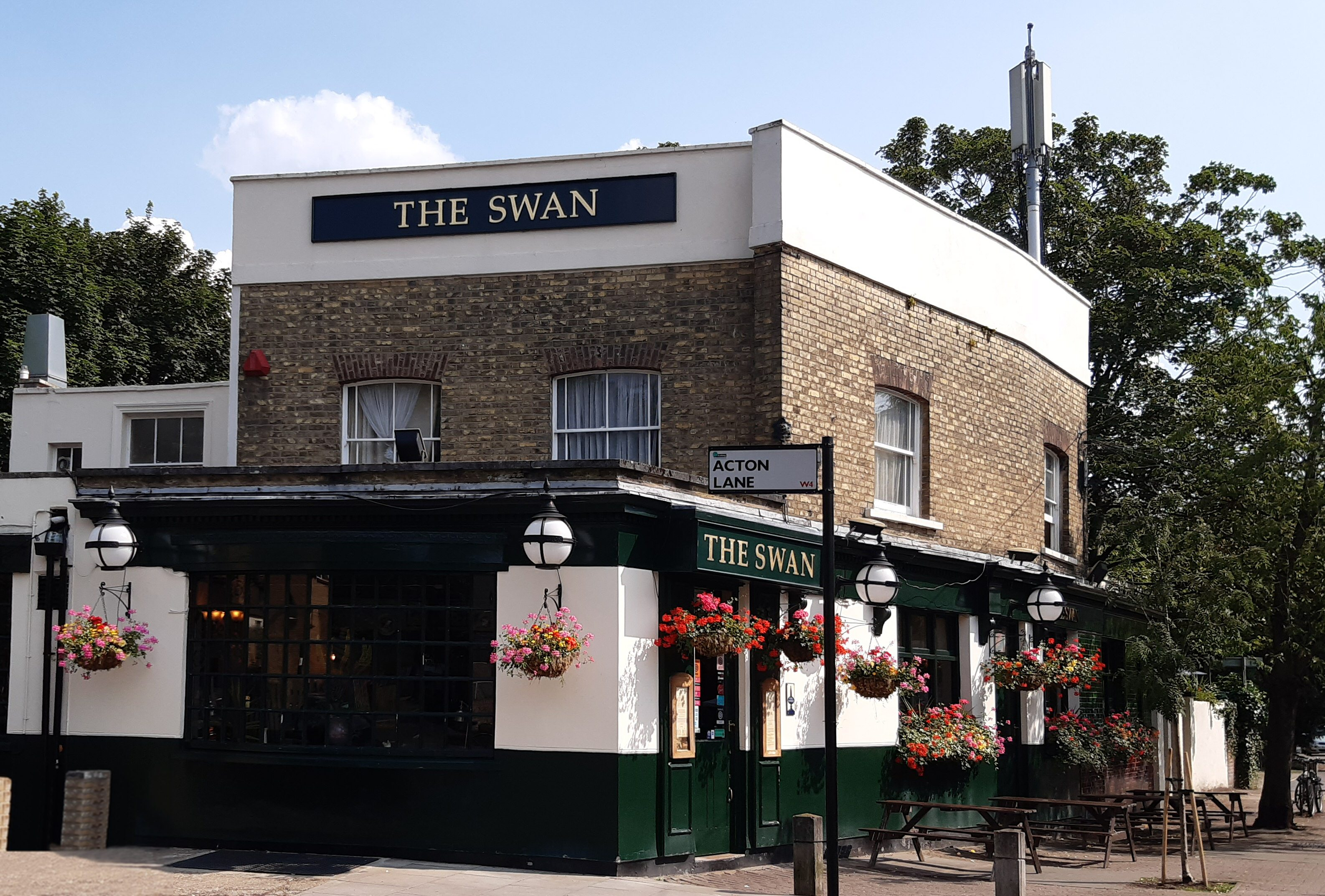
The Swan, Acton Lane

== Transport ==
Chiswick Park tube station on the District line, opened in 1879 as 'Acton Green' station, and renamed in 1887, is at the Western end of Acton Green common.

The London Buses route 94 to Piccadilly Circus terminates at the northwestern corner of Acton Green common.
