= St Alban's Church, Acton Green =

- St Alban the Martyr
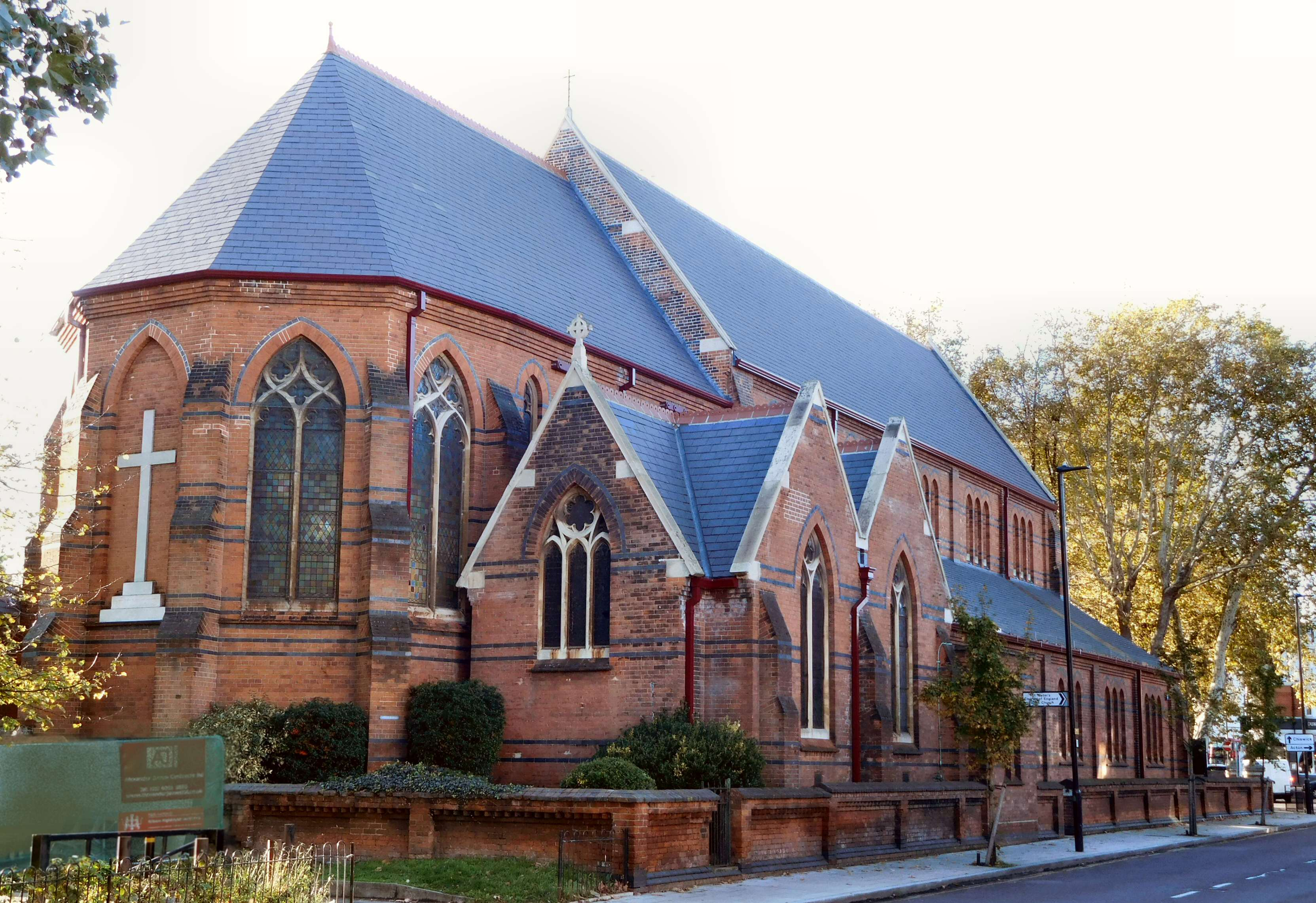
- From the East
- St Alban's Church, Acton Green
- 51°29′45″N 00°15′47″W
- Location: South Parade; Acton Green, London
- Country: England
- Denomination: Church of England
- Website: www.christchurchw4.com

History
- Founded: 1887

Architecture
- Functional status: Active
- Architect(s): Edward Monson, Jr.
- Style: Neo-Gothic

Specifications
- Materials: Red brick, stone dressings

Administration
- Diocese: London
- Archdeaconry: Middlesex

St Alban's Church, Acton Green, also called St Alban the Martyr, is a church on South Parade, Acton Green in Chiswick, west London, designed by Edward Monson Jr. and opened in 1888.

== History ==
The church was designed by Edward Monson Jr. in a neo-Gothic style, and is built of red brick with stone dressings; it has a steeply pitched slate roof and no tower or belfry. The foundation stone was laid on 18 October 1887 and the church was opened in 1888. It is now the main landmark of the Acton Green Conservation Area. It is described by Nikolaus Pevsner as a "large raw red basilica on the edge of the green", though the conservation area character appraisal by Ealing Council notes "its imposing architecture", and that "The view of the church from the Green is unfortunately obscured by the temporary church hall and club buildings (the latter in green painted corrugated iron)." The church building is Grade II listed. The nearby vicarage uses the same red brick and stone window surrounds and mullions.

Three of the stained glass windows are by Frederick Hamilton Jackson, including Jesus and the Doctors, dedicated by Blanche Rose Harper in 1888.

The green corrugated iron building to the south of the church seems to be a "tin tabernacle", placed there for use in mission services run by All Saints, South Acton until 1938. Also south of the church is "The Caterpillar" Montessori nursery school.

On 15 January 1909, The Chiswick Times reported that Miss Gladys Cowper of Fairlawn Court, Acton Green, and Captain Guy Maxwell Shipway, son of Colonel Shipway of Grove House, Chiswick, were married in the church.

The theologian and author W. O. E. Oesterley was vicar in the 1920s.

The congregation declined and in 2007 the church was closed. In 2011, developers applied for permission to convert the church into 10 flats and a detached house. The application was opposed, and in 2013 a public inquiry was held. The planning inspector rejected the application on the grounds that a local community facility for which there was a continued demand would be lost. The church returned to active use in 2014 as part of the Christ Church W4 ministry alongside Christ Church, Turnham Green, after standing empty for seven years. The building was restored with solar panels on the roof, a new heating system, nest boxes for swifts, and new kitchen and toilets. On 4 October 2016 the Bishop of London, Richard Chartres, rededicated the renovated church.

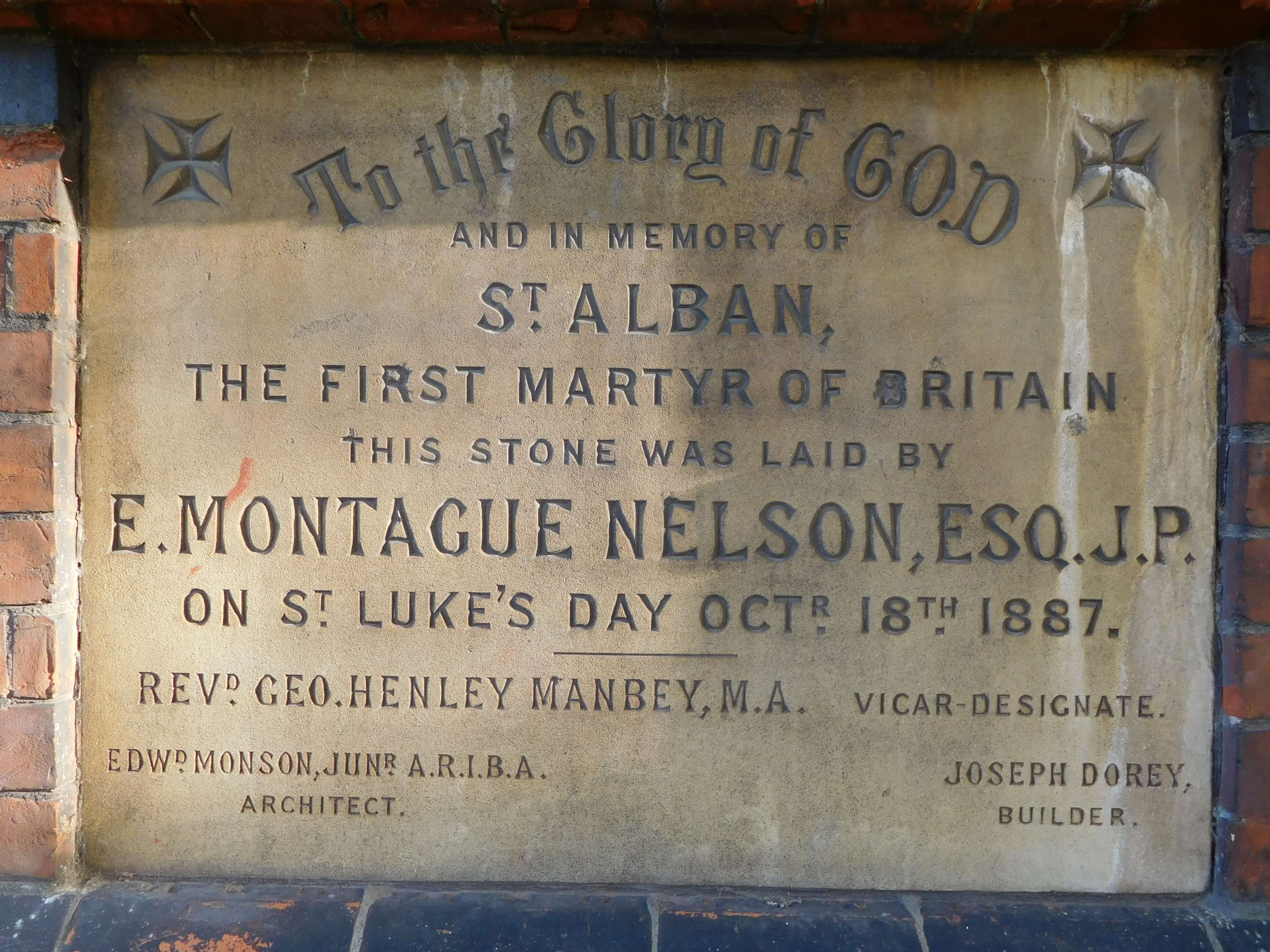
Dedication stone to Saint Alban the martyr, laid by E. Montague Nelson, J.P., on 18 October 1887. It records that Rev. George Henley Manbey was the vicar-designate, that Edward Monson, Jr. was the architect, and that Joseph Dorey was the builder.

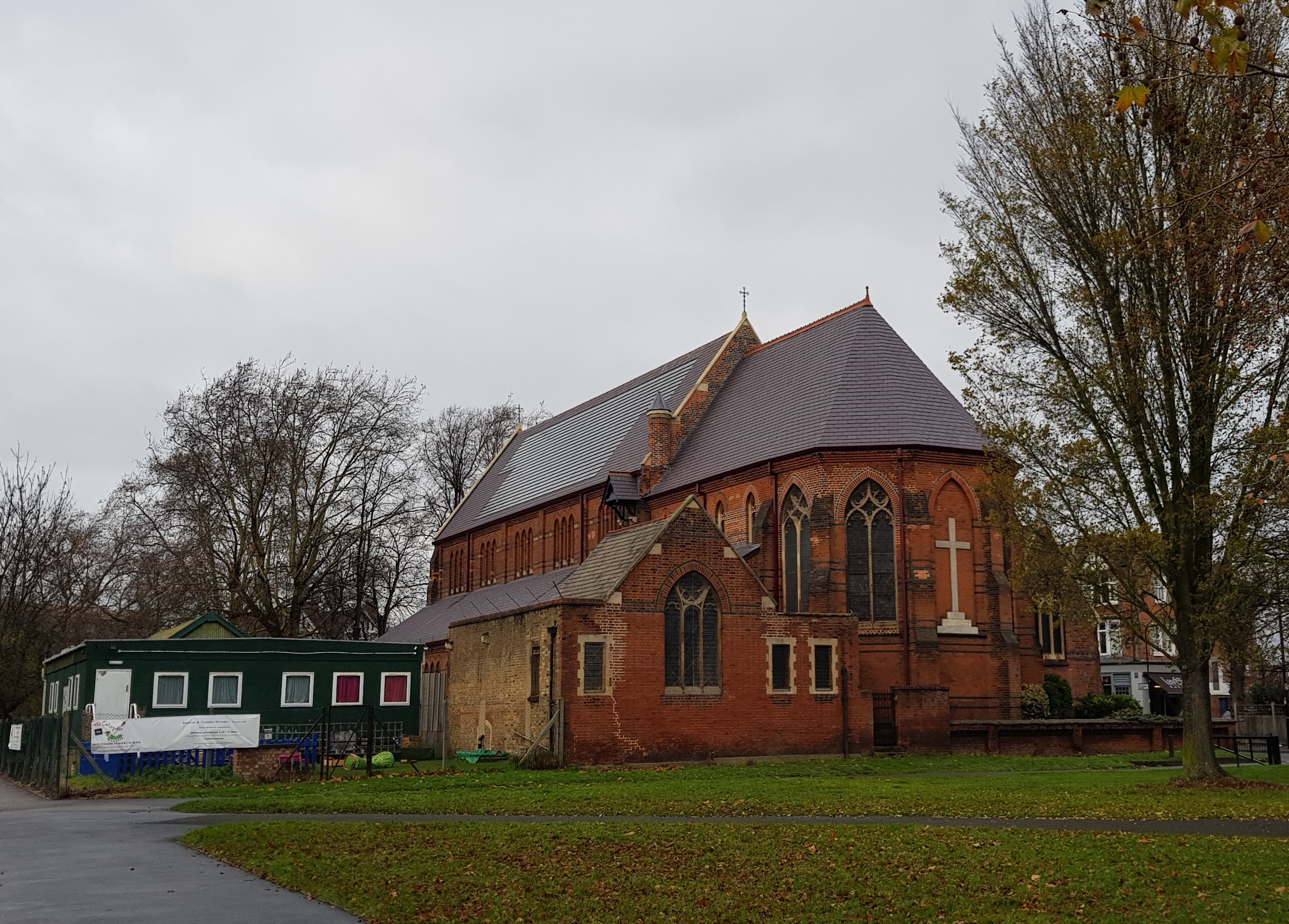
The church and school
