= Chênehutte-Trèves-Cunault =

- Part of Gennes-Val-de-Loire
- Location of Chênehutte-Trèves-Cunault
- Location within France Location within Pays de la Loire
- Coordinates: 47°18′33″N 0°09′09″W
- Country: France
- Region: Pays de la Loire
- Department: Maine-et-Loire
- Arrondissement: Saumur
- Canton: Doué-la-Fontaine
- Commune: Gennes-Val-de-Loire
- Area^{1}: 27.61 km^{2} (10.66 sq mi)
- Elevation: 30 m (98 ft)
- Highest elevation: 96 m (315 ft)
- Lowest elevation: 20 m (66 ft)
- Population (2022): 975
  - Density: 35.3/km^{2} (91.5/sq mi)
- Demonym(s): Cunaldien, Cunaldienne; Trèvois, Trèvoise; Chênehuttois, Chênehuttoise
- Time zone: UTC+01:00 (CET)
  - Summer (DST): UTC+02:00 (CEST)
- Postal code: 49350
- Website: www.chenehutte-treves-cunault.fr
- ^{1} French Land Register data, which excludes lakes, ponds, glaciers > 1 km^{2} (0.386 sq mi or 247 acres) and river estuaries.

Chênehutte-Trèves-Cunault (French pronunciation: [ʃɛnyt tʁɛv kyno]) is a former commune in the Maine-et-Loire department of western France. On 1 January 2016, it was merged into the new commune of Gennes-Val-de-Loire. It was created by the merger of the commune of Chênehutte-les-Tuffeaux with the commune of Trèves-Cunault in January 1974.

== See also ==
- Communes of the Maine-et-Loire department
