= Frederick Hamilton Jackson =

British painter (1848–1923)

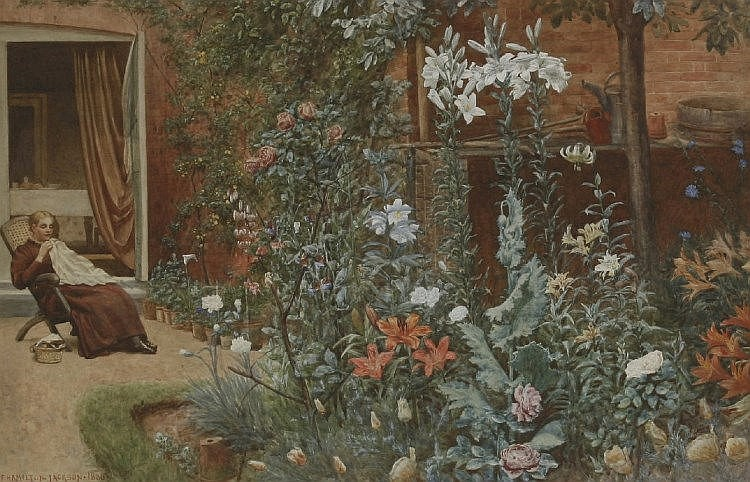
- In the garden (in Bedford Park), 1886
- Born: 1848; Islington, London
- Died: 13 October 1923; Wandsworth
- Occupation: Painter

Frederick Hamilton Jackson (1848–1923), also known as Frank, was a painter, designer, and author. He was a frequent exhibitor at the Royal Academy and in other places.

== Biography ==
F. Hamilton Jackson was born in 1848 in Islington, London. He won a first-class medal at the Royal Academy Schools, and became a teacher at the Slade school of art. He helped to found the Society of Designers, and served as vice-president there; he was similarly a founder member of the London Sketch Club and served as its first honorary secretary. He was a member of the Art Workers' Guild, becoming a council member in 1907; he was also on the council of the Society of Miniature Painters. He became vice-president of the Royal Society of British Artists.

He lived in Bedford Park, Chiswick from about 1880 until about 1904, and then moved to Wandsworth.

He made a set of stained glass windows for St Alban's Church, Acton Green in 1888, comprising Adoration of the Magi, Reception into Heaven, Jesus and the Doctors, and Jesus and the Children.

He created the mosaic reredos for St Bartholomew's Church, Brighton.

He died at his home in Wandsworth on the 13 October 1923 and is buried in Putney Vale Cemetery.

Paintings

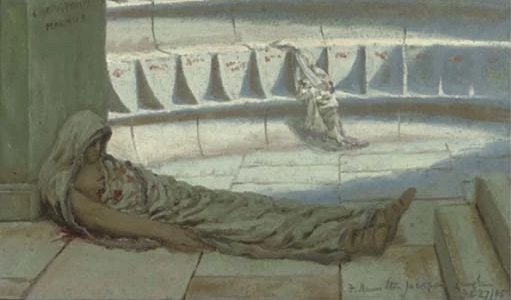
The death of Caesar, 1865

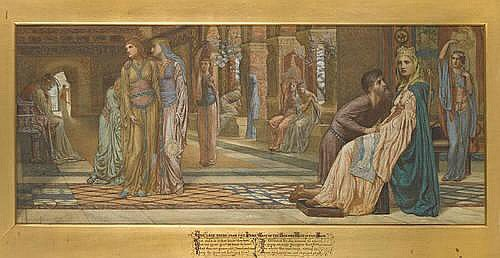
What chain is it, that binds thee fast?, 1875

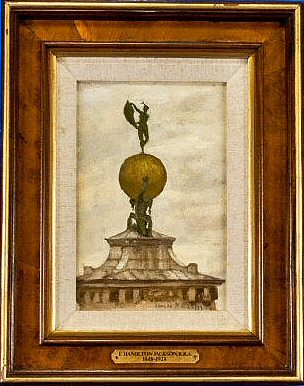
Sketch of a statue on roof of a building in Venice, 1877

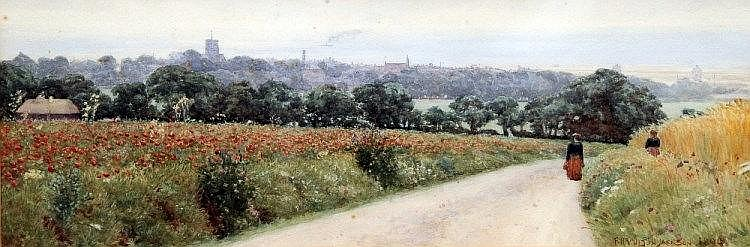
The Road to the Sea, 1890

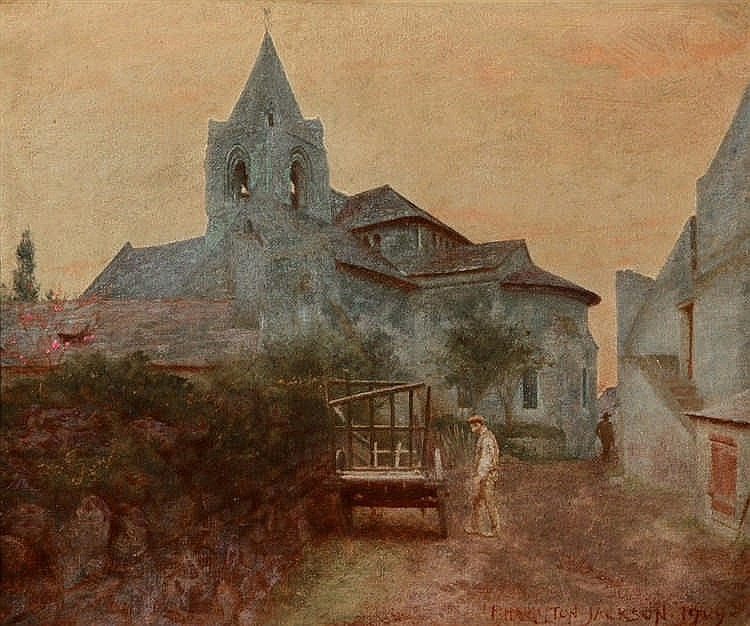
Eglise Saint Aubin, Treves, near Saumur, 1909

== Works ==
- 1903 Intarsia and Marquestry, a Handbook for the Designer and Craftsman - Sands & Co., London
- 1904 True stories of the condottieri - Sands & Co., London
- 1904 Mural painting – Sands and Co., London
- 1905 "Sicily"
- 1906 The shores of the Adriatic, the Italian side: an architectural and archæological pilgrimage - John Murray, London
- 1907 Cantor Lectures on Romanesque Ornament Printed by W. Trounce, (Series of three lectures delivered at the Society for the Encouragement of Arts, Manufactures & Commerce.)
- 1908 The Shores of the Adriatic, the Austrian side, the Ku Istria, and Dalmatia - John Murray, London
- 1912 Rambles in the Pyrenees and the adjacent districts - John Murray, London
