= Duke of Sussex, Acton Green =

Pub in Acton Green, London

Coordinates: 51.4963°N 0.2641°W

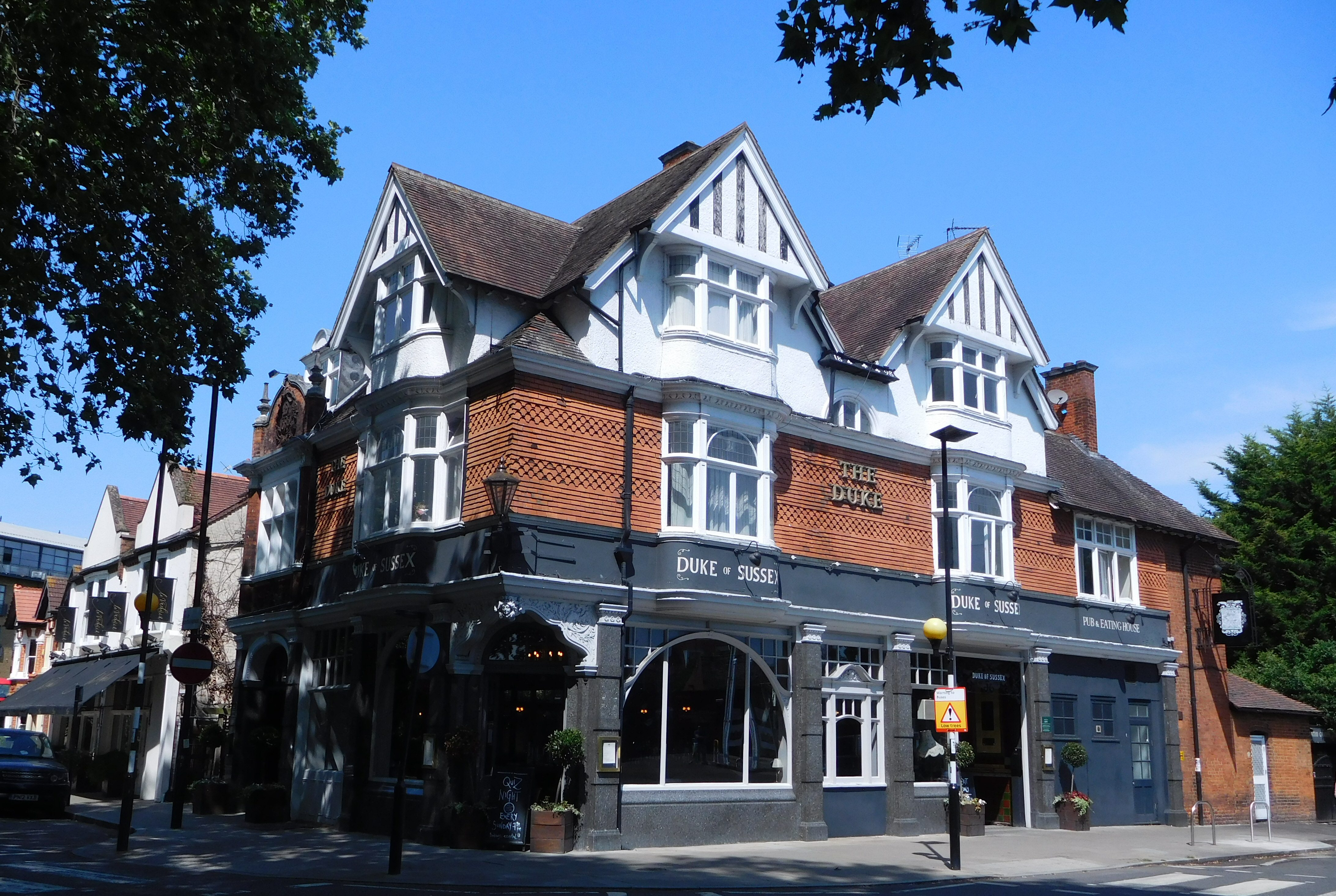
The Duke of Sussex public house

The Duke of Sussex, Acton Green is a public house, opened in 1898, in the northern Chiswick district of Acton Green. It is prominently situated on a corner facing the common. The Grade II listed building is "elaborately decorated" to a design by the pub architects Shoebridge & Rising.

== Architecture ==
=== Exterior ===
The current Duke of Sussex public house was built in 1897 by the Cannon Brewery, Clerkenwell, and opened in 1898. On the corner of Beaconsfield Road and Acton Lane, it faces the north of Acton Green common; it replaced an earlier beerhouse, in existence by 1842. The "elaborately decorated" building was designed by the pub architects Shoebridge & Rising, and is Grade II listed. It has two storeys, with dormer windows for the attic and cellars below. The main front faces east on to Beaconsfield Road, with three bays, two of them with dormers, separated by a small half-round Diocletian window, and the third an extension to house the kitchens and staircase. The walls are covered in white stucco, with the first storey hung with flat red tiles. The first storey and attic windows below the dormers are projecting "Ipswich oriels" in the style of Norman Shaw under ornamental cornices. The ground floor bar area has big arched windows, and an elaborate corner doorway; the doorway to the north is adorned with ornamental ironwork.

Duke of Sussex public house, opened in 1898

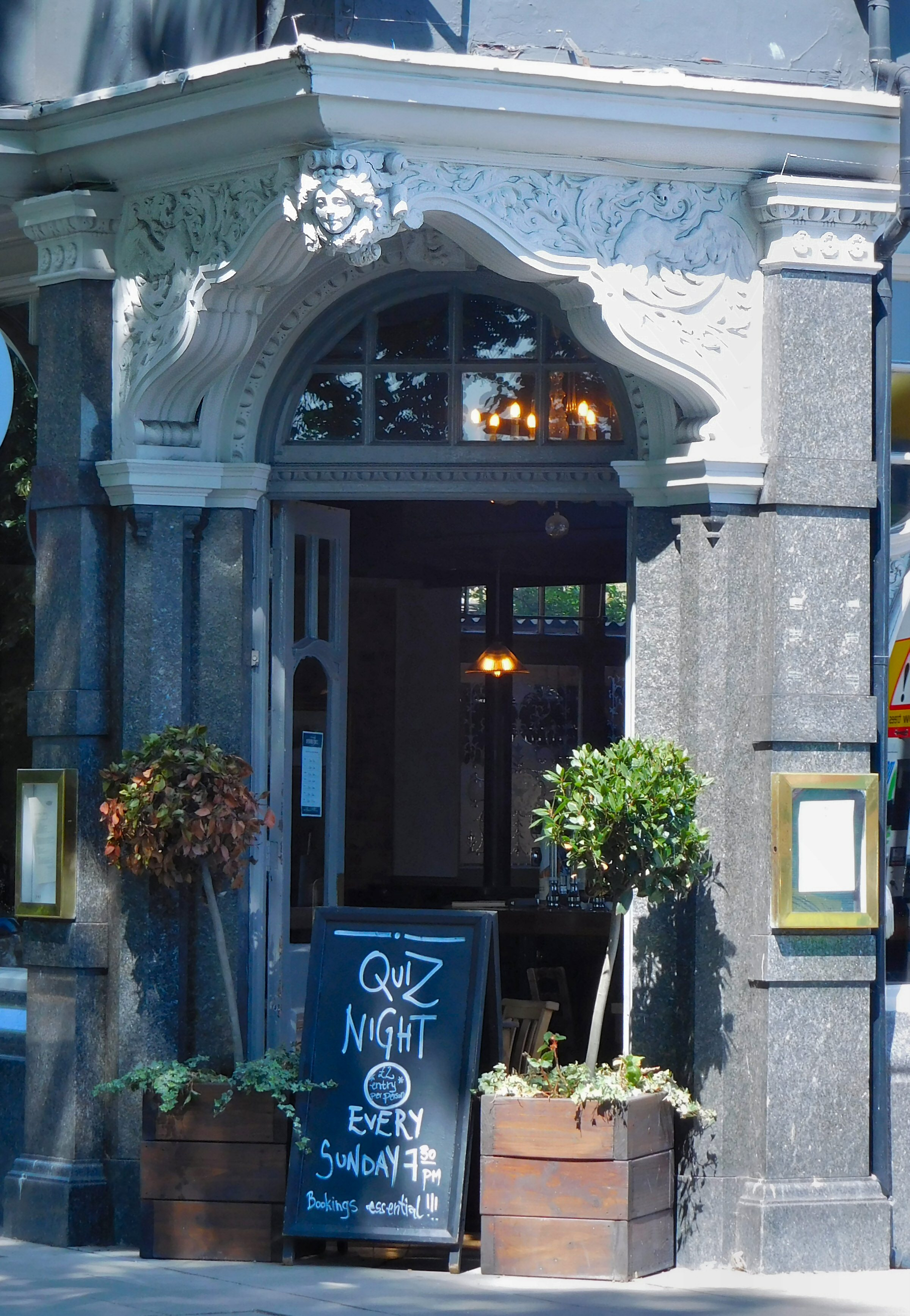
Ornamented corner doorway

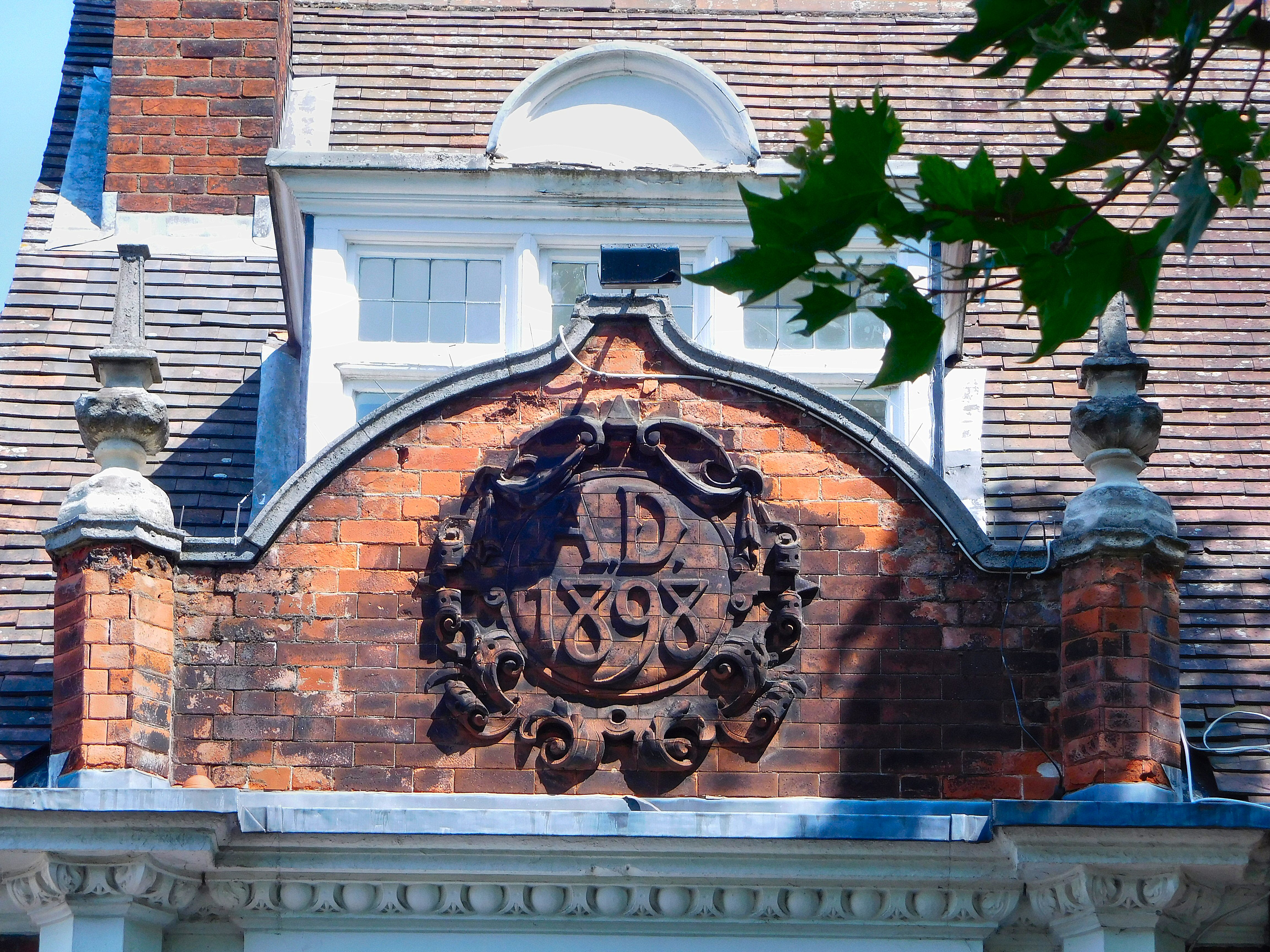
'AD 1898' brick cartouche

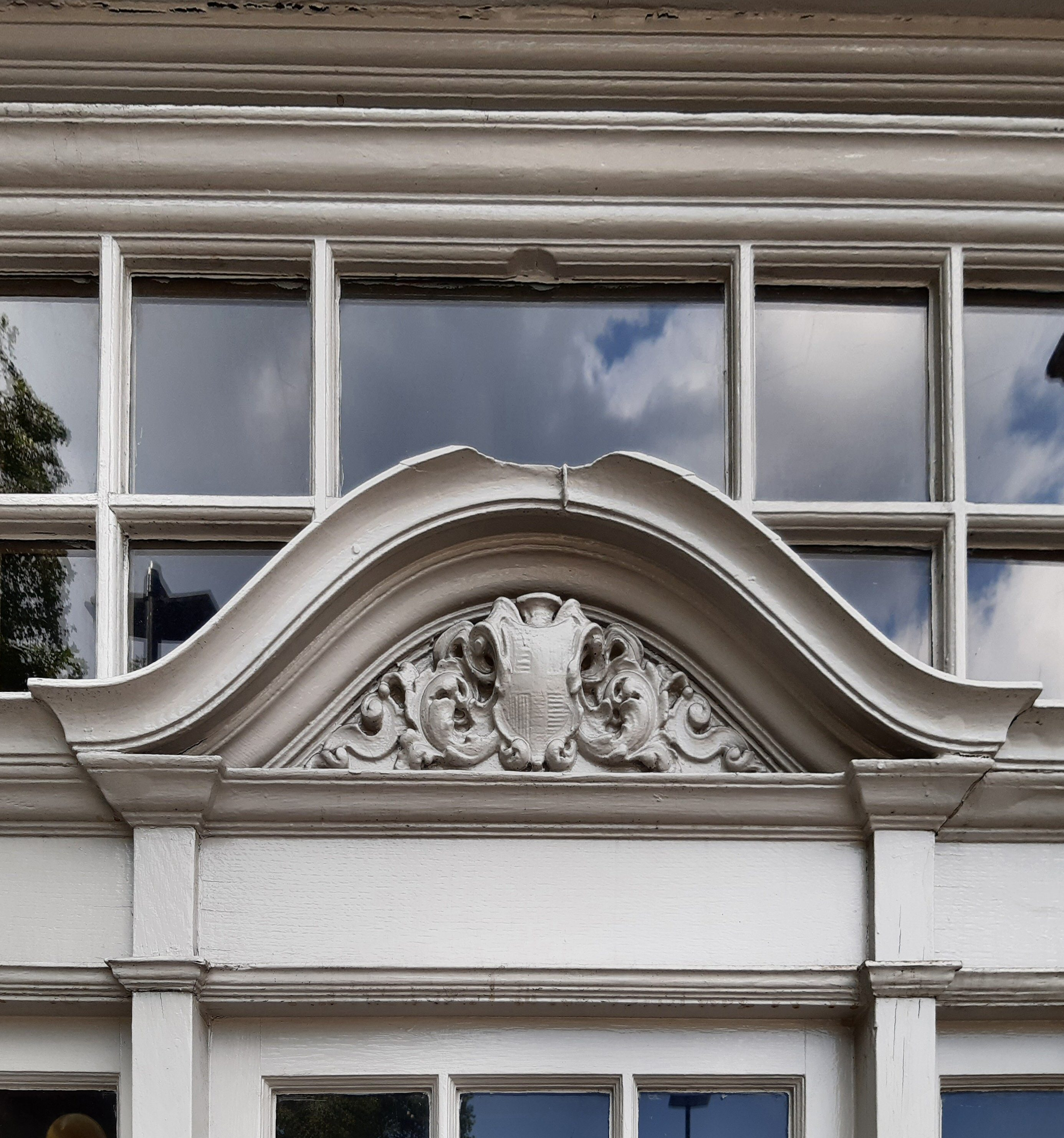
Decorative pediment

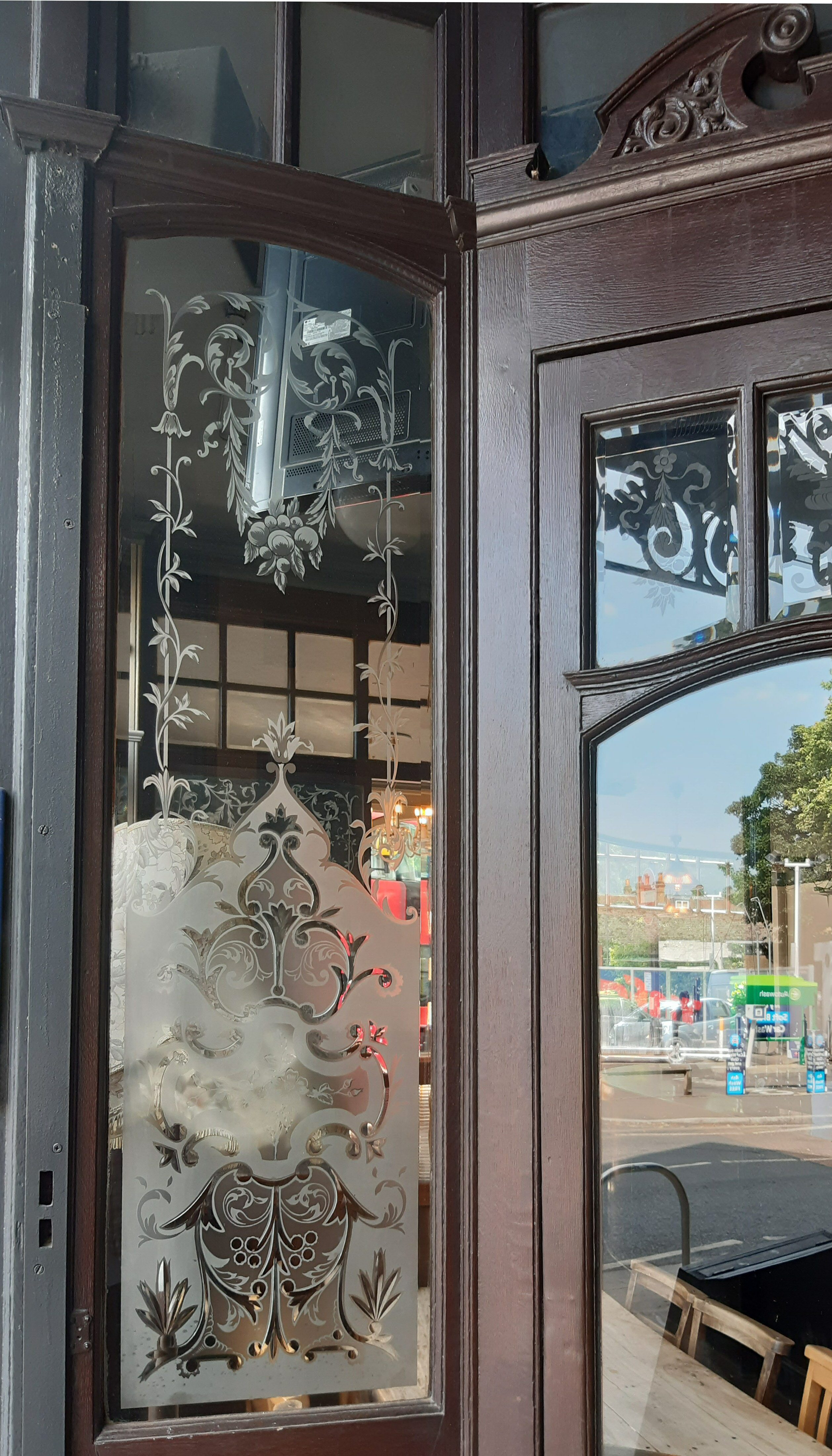
Ornamental glass

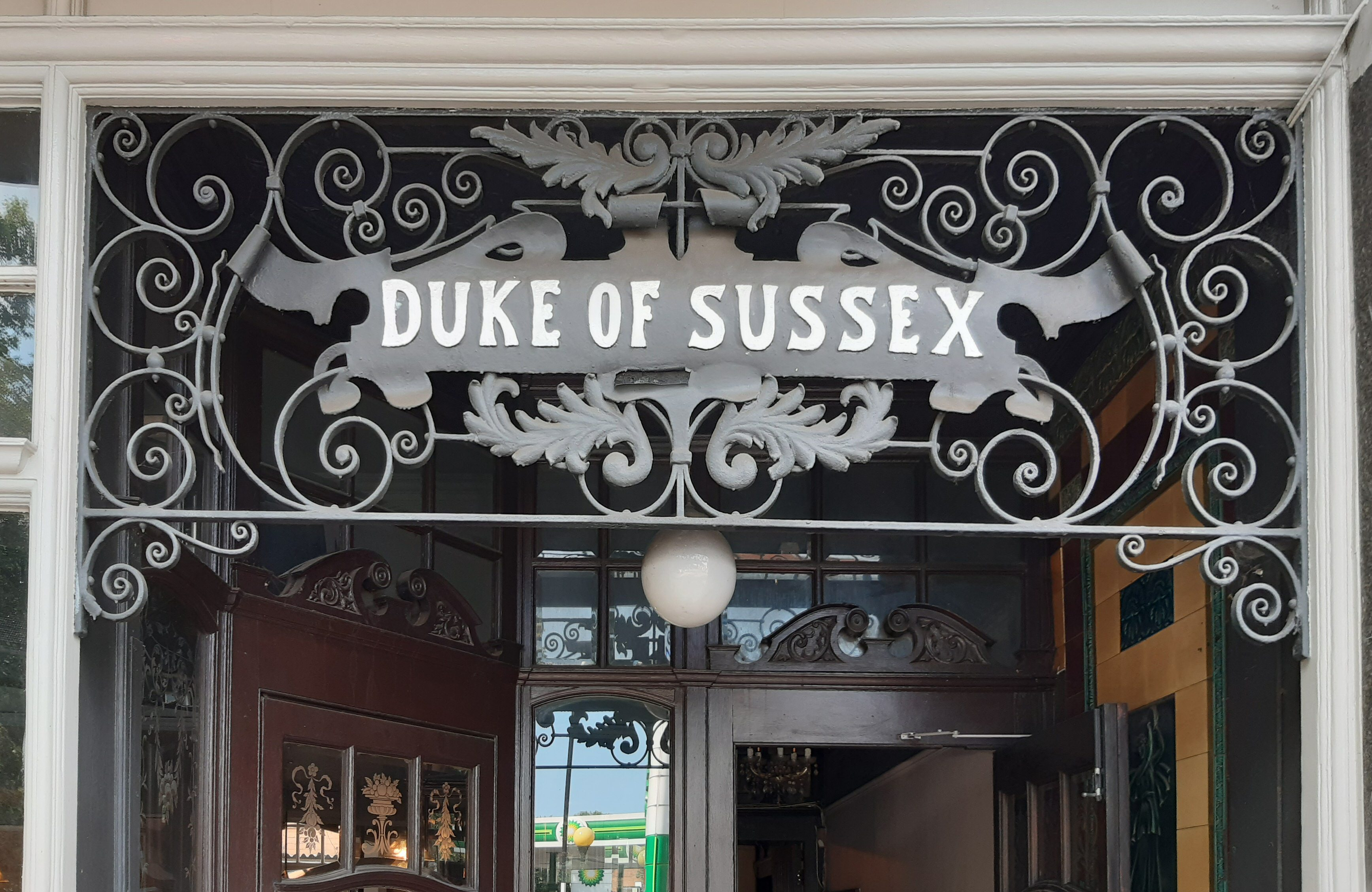
Ornamental ironwork

=== Interior ===
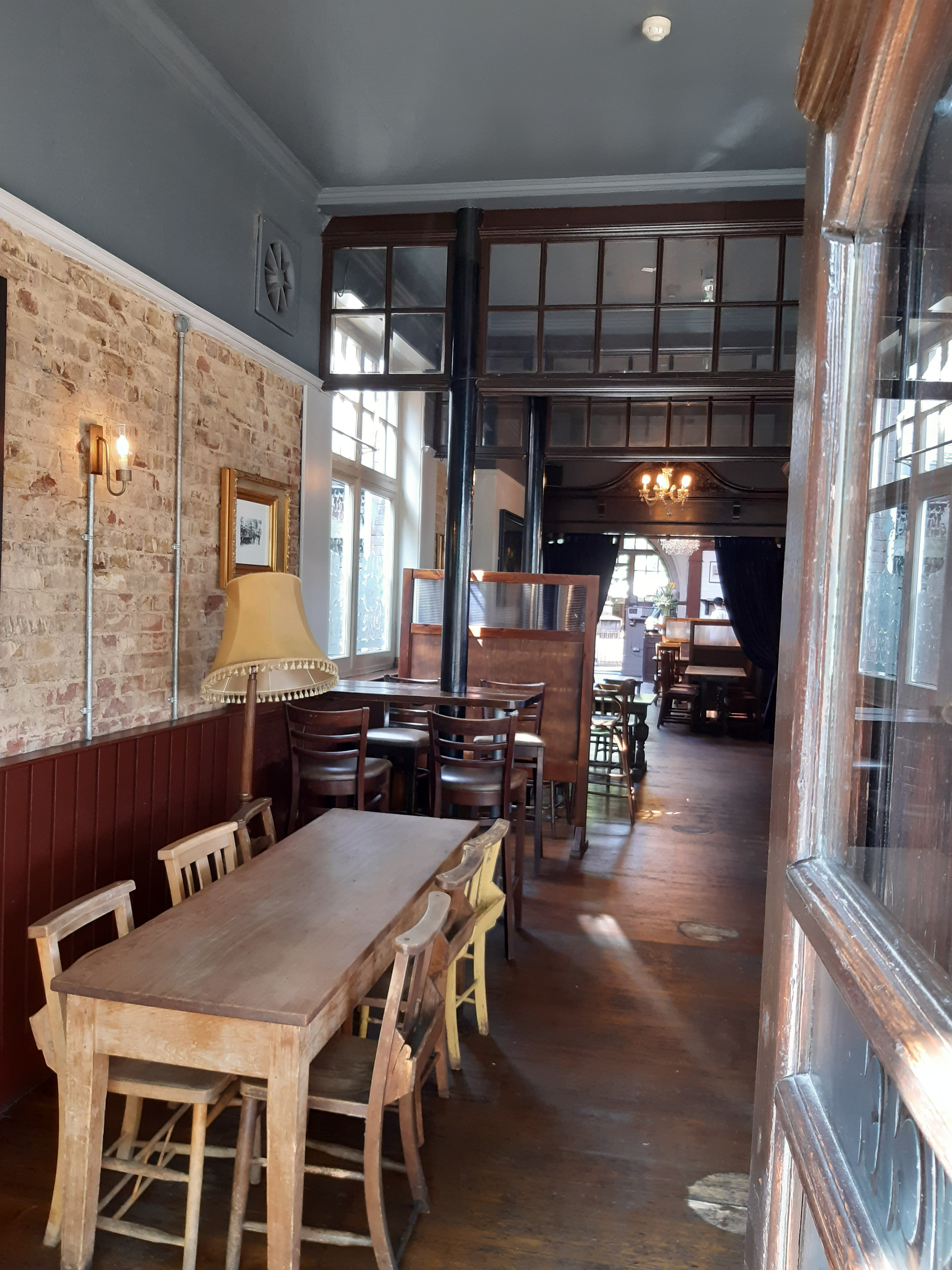
Interior

The interior, formerly four bar rooms, is now open-plan with a central bar. Parts of the original interior partitioning survive, providing "an unusually rich, turn-of-the-century pub interior". From the north doorway the floor is paved with mosaic, forming a path that leads to the former billiard room. The room, now used as the restaurant, has a large skylight with arched cast-iron brackets and a panelled wooden border decorated with painted swags and cherubs.

== Public house ==
The pub is named for Prince Augustus Frederick, Duke of Sussex (1773–1843), son of King George III and uncle of Queen Victoria.

The business describes itself as a "pub and dining room" with a beer garden. Its menu includes tapas and other Spanish dishes.

The Good Pub Guide calls it an "attractive Victorian local with unexpectedly large back garden", noting the horseshoe-shaped central counter, the chandeliers and the "splendid skylight". It mentions the "interesting modern food including shared platters".

The Harden's restaurant guide calls the Duke of Sussex "a very traditional pub" with a "lovely patio garden, ideal for the summer".

Time Out found the pub "lively" with good beer, but especially admired the "beautiful restaurant room" with its skylight and "cherubs to acknowledge its loftiness". It liked the range of tapas and Spanish main dishes, as well as the cheeseboard with both familiar and less usual Spanish varieties.
