= Trèves-Cunault =

Coordinates: 47°19′N 0°11′W

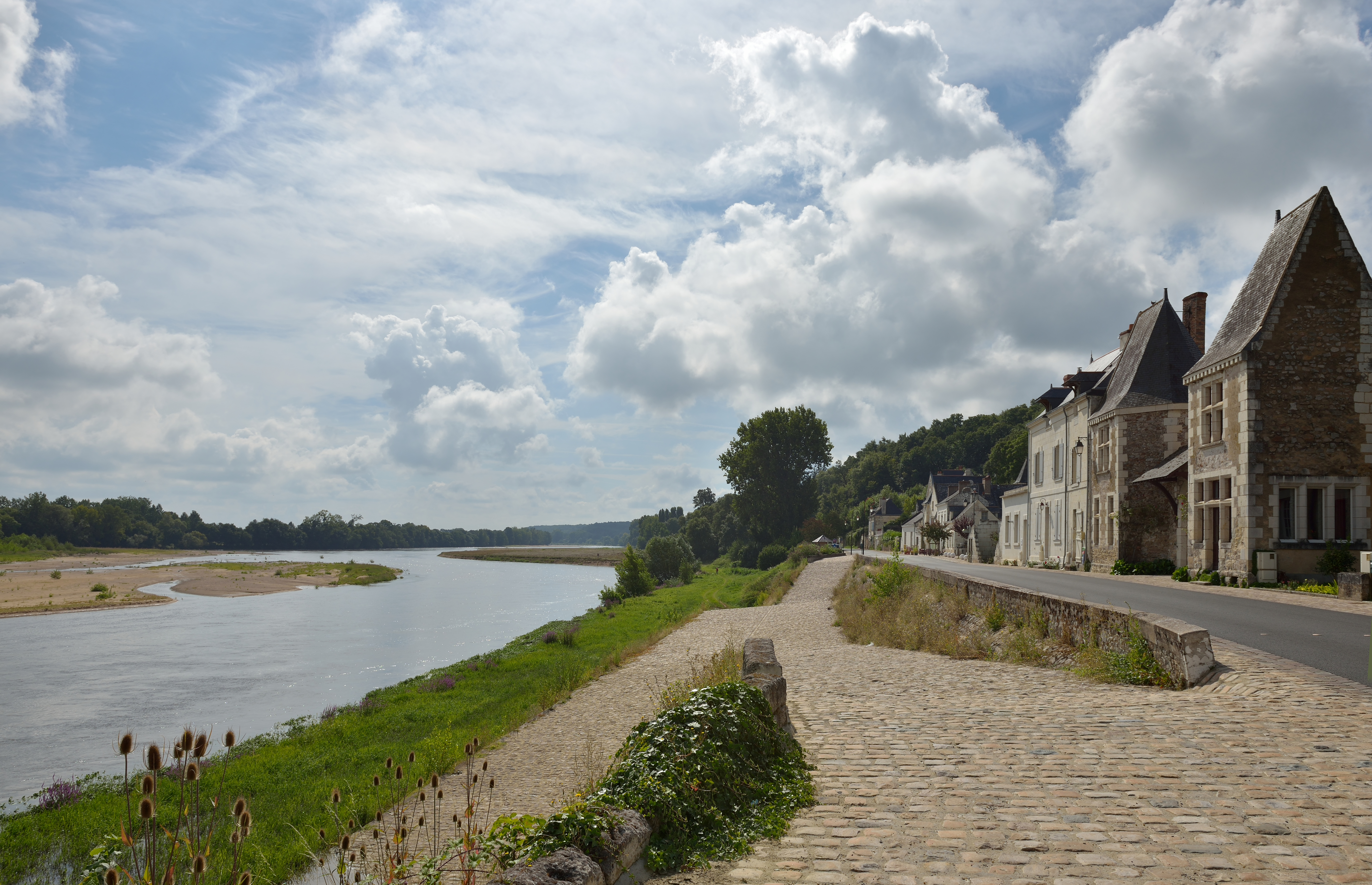
Loire from Notre Dame de Cunault

Trèves-Cunault (French pronunciation: [tʁɛv kyno]) is a former commune in the department of Maine-et-Loire, France that existed from 1839 to 1974. It was created in 1839 by the merger of the communes of Trèves and Cunault. In January 1974, it was merged with the commune of Chênehutte-les-Tuffeaux to form the new commune of Chênehutte-Trèves-Cunault, which was absorbed into the new commune Gennes-Val-de-Loire in January 2016.

== See also ==
- Communes of the Maine-et-Loire department
