= Timeline of temperature and pressure measurement technology =

This is a timeline of temperature and pressure measurement technology or the history of temperature measurement and pressure measurement technology.

== Timeline ==
=== 1500s ===
- 1592–1593 — Galileo Galilei builds a device showing variation of hotness known as the thermoscope using the contraction of air to draw water up a tube.

=== 1600s ===
- 1612 — Santorio Sanctorius makes the first thermometer for medical use.
- 1617 — Giuseppe Biancani published the first clear diagram of a thermoscope
- 1624 — The word thermometer (in its French form) first appeared in La Récréation Mathématique by Jean Leurechon, who describes one with a scale of 8 degrees.
- 1629 — Joseph Solomon Delmedigo describes in a book an accurate sealed-glass thermometer that uses brandy
- 1638 — Robert Fludd the first thermoscope showing a scale and thus constituting a thermometer.
- 1643 — Evangelista Torricelli invents the mercury barometer
- 1654 — Ferdinando II de' Medici, Grand Duke of Tuscany, made sealed tubes part filled with alcohol, with a bulb and stem, the first modern-style thermometer, depending on the expansion of a liquid, and independent of air pressure
- 1669 — Honoré Fabri suggested using a temperature scale by dividing into 8 equal parts the interval between "greatest heat of summer" and melting snow.
- 1676 to 1679 — Edme Mariotte conducted experiments that under the French Academy of Sciences' Paris Observatory, resulting in wide adoption of temperatures of deep cellars as a fixed reference point, rather than snow or water freezing points.
- 1685 — Giovanni Alfonso Borelli's posthumously published De motu animalium ["On the movements of animals"] reported that the temperature of blood in a vivisected stag is the same in the left ventricle of the heart, the liver, lungs and intestines.
- 1688 — Joachim Dalencé proposed constructing a thermometer by dividing into 20 equal degrees the interval between freezing water and melting butter, then extrapolating 4 degrees upwards and downwards.
- 1694 ― Carlo Rinaldini proposed a universal scale of 12 degrees between the freezing and boiling points of water, along with a corresponding calibration procedure.
- 1695 — Guillaume Amontons improved the thermometer.

=== 1700s ===
- 1701 — Newton publishes anonymously a method of determining the rate of heat loss of a body and introduces a scale, which had 0 degrees represent the freezing point of water, and 12 degrees for human body temperature. He used linseed oil as the thermometric fluid.
- 1701 — Ole Christensen Rømer made one of the first practical thermometers. As a temperature indicator it used red wine. (Rømer scale), The temperature scale used for his thermometer had 0 representing the temperature of a salt and ice mixture (at about 259 s).
- 1709 — Daniel Gabriel Fahrenheit constructed alcohol thermometers which were reproducible (i.e. two would give the same temperature)
- 1714 — Daniel Gabriel Fahrenheit invents the mercury-in-glass thermometer giving much greater precision (4 x that of Rømer). Using Rømer's zero point and an upper point of blood temperature, he adjusted the scale so the melting point of ice was 32 and the upper point 96, meaning that the difference of 64 could be got by dividing the intervals into 2 repeatedly.
- 1731 — René Antoine Ferchault de Réaumur produced a scale in which 0 represented the freezing point of water and 80 represented the boiling point. This was chosen as his alcohol mixture expanded 80 parts per thousand. He did not consider pressure.
- 1738 — Daniel Bernoulli asserted in Hydrodynamica the principle that as the speed of a moving fluid increases, the pressure within the fluid decreases. (Kinetic theory)
- 1742 — Anders Celsius proposed a temperature scale in which 100 represented the temperature of melting ice and 0 represented the boiling point of water at 25 inches and 3 lines of barometric mercury height. This corresponds to 751.16 mm, so that on the present-day definition, this boiling point is 99.67 degrees Celsius.
- 1743 — Jean-Pierre Christin had worked independently of Celsius and developed a scale where zero represented the melting point of ice and 100 represented the boiling point but did not specify a pressure.
- 1744 — Carl Linnaeus suggested reversing the temperature scale of Anders Celsius so that 0 represented the freezing point of water and 100 represented the boiling point.
- 1782 — James Six invents the Maximum minimum thermometer

=== 1800s ===
- 1821 — Thomas Johann Seebeck invents the thermocouple
- 1844 — Lucien Vidi invents the aneroid Barograph
- 1845 — Francis Ronalds invents the first successful Barograph based on photography
- 1848 — Lord Kelvin (William Thomson) – Kelvin scale, in his paper, On an Absolute Thermometric Scale
- 1849 — Eugène Bourdon – Bourdon_gauge (manometer)
- 1849 — Henri Victor Regnault – Hypsometer
- 1864 — Henri Becquerel suggests an optical pyrometer
- 1866 — Thomas Clifford Allbutt invented a clinical thermometer that produced a body temperature reading in five minutes as opposed to twenty.
- 1871 — William Siemens describes the Resistance thermometer at the Bakerian Lecture
- 1874 — Herbert McLeod invents the McLeod gauge
- 1885 — Calender-Van Duesen invented the platinum resistance temperature device
- 1887 — Richard Assmann invents the psychrometer (Wet and Dry Bulb Thermometers)
- 1892 — Henri-Louis Le Châtelier builds the first optical pyrometer
- 1896 — Samuel Siegfried Karl Ritter von Basch introduced the Sphygmomanometer to measure blood pressure

=== 1900s ===
- 1906 — Marcello Pirani – Pirani gauge (to measure pressures in vacuum systems)
- 1915 — J.C. Stevens — Chart recorder (first chart recorder for environmental monitoring)
- 1924 — Irving Langmuir — Langmuir probe (to measure plasma parameters)
- 1930 — Samuel Ruben invented the thermistor

== See also ==
- Dimensional metrology
- Forensic metrology
- Smart Metrology
- Time metrology
- Quantum metrology
- History of thermodynamic temperature
- Timeline of heat engine technology
- List of timelines
