= Breguet's thermometer =

Breguet's thermometer, also called a spiral thermometer, is a type of thermometer which uses the expansion of metal under heat to produce a measurement more sensitive, and with a higher range, than both mercury and air thermometers. Working on the principle of a bimetallic strip, it consists of a very slender strip of platinum soldered to a similar strip of silver, with a slip of gold soldered in between.

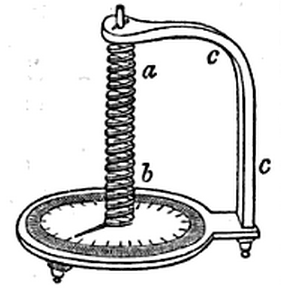
Breguet's thermometer diagram

The strips of soldered metals are curved into a helix (a). The upper extremity of the helix is fastened to a metallic support (c) and the lower extremity is connected to an index, which projects over a graduated circle (b).

The expansion of silver with temperature is almost twice as great as platinum, with gold being somewhere in between. The result is that a temperature rise or fall will cause a corresponding twist in the spiral, moving the index. The slip of gold in between is to prevent "sudden starts".
