= Liquid crystal thermometer =

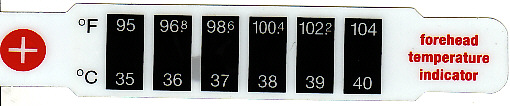
Liquid crystal forehead thermometer

A liquid crystal thermometer, temperature strip or plastic strip thermometer is a type of thermometer that contains heat-sensitive (thermochromic) liquid crystals in a plastic strip that change colour to indicate different temperatures. Liquid crystals possess the mechanical properties of a liquid, but have the optical properties of a single crystal. Temperature changes can affect the colour of a liquid crystal, which makes them useful for temperature measurement. The resolution of liquid crystal sensors is in the 0.1 °C (0.2 °F) range. Disposable liquid crystal thermometers have been developed for home and medical use. For example, if the thermometer is put onto someone's forehead, it will change colour depending on the temperature of the person's body.

There are two stages in the liquid crystals:

1. the hot nematic stage is the closest to the liquid phase where the molecules are freely moving around and only partly ordered.
2. the cold smectic stage is closest to a solid phase where the molecules align themselves into tightly wound chiral matrices.

Liquid crystal thermometers portray temperatures as colors and can be used to follow temperature changes caused by heat flow. They can be used to observe that heat flows by conduction, convection, and radiation.

In medical applications, liquid crystal thermometers may be used to read body temperature by placing them against the forehead. These are safer than a mercury-in-glass thermometer, and may be advantageous in some patients, but do not always give an exact result, except for the analytic liquid crystal thermometer which shows the exact temperature between 35.5 and 40.5 °C (96–105 °F).

Liquid crystal thermometers are also commonly used in aquariums, in homebrewing, and in mood rings.

The liquid crystal thermometer was invented by Bob Parker in California, one of many of the inventor's thermochromic applications patented in the 1970s.
