= Mercury-in-glass thermometer =

Type of thermometer

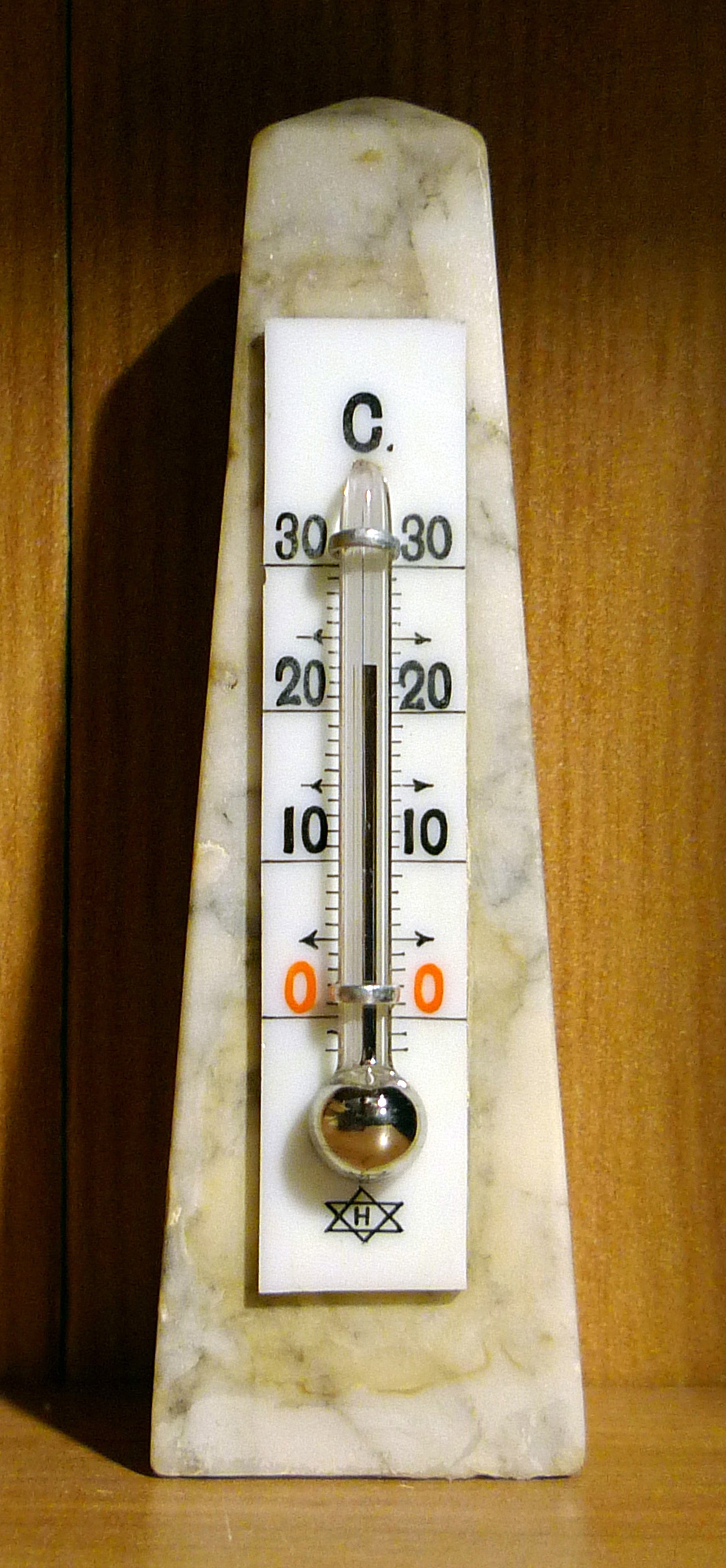
Mercury-in-glass thermometer for measurement of room temperature.

The mercury-in-glass or mercury thermometer is a thermometer that uses the thermal expansion and contraction of liquid mercury to indicate the temperature.

== Construction ==
A basic mercury thermometer is a precisely crafted piece of tube-shaped glass enveloping a mercury-filled reservoir connected to an extremely thin channel, called the capillary bore, that provides a chamber the mercury from the reservoir can expand into. The shorter, bulbous end of the tube containing the reservoir is called the bulb and the longer, narrower end with the bore is called the stem. Etched into the stem or on a carefully aligned plate next to it is a graduated temperature scale. Lower temperatures are near the bulb and higher temperatures near the top of the stem. The space above the mercury may be filled with nitrogen gas or it may be at less than atmospheric pressure, a partial vacuum.

== Theory of operation ==
As the temperature of the surrounding environment changes, the mercury thermally expands and contracts, causing it to move out of, or into, the reservoir and, at the same time, rise or fall through the bore. Although changes to the mercury's volume are slight— about 0.018% for each degree Celsius— the small volume of the bore compared to the bulb's volume visually amplifies the change. This design feature results in clearly visible movement of the mercury up or down the scale, enabling precise temperature readings.

== Calibration ==
In order to calibrate the thermometer, the bulb is made to reach thermal equilibrium with a temperature standard such as an ice/water mixture, and then with another standard such as water/vapour, and the tube is divided into regular intervals between the fixed points. In principle, thermometers made of different material (e.g., coloured alcohol thermometers) might be expected to give different intermediate readings due to different expansion properties; in practice the substances used are chosen to have reasonably linear expansion characteristics as a function of thermodynamic temperature, and so give similar results.

== History ==
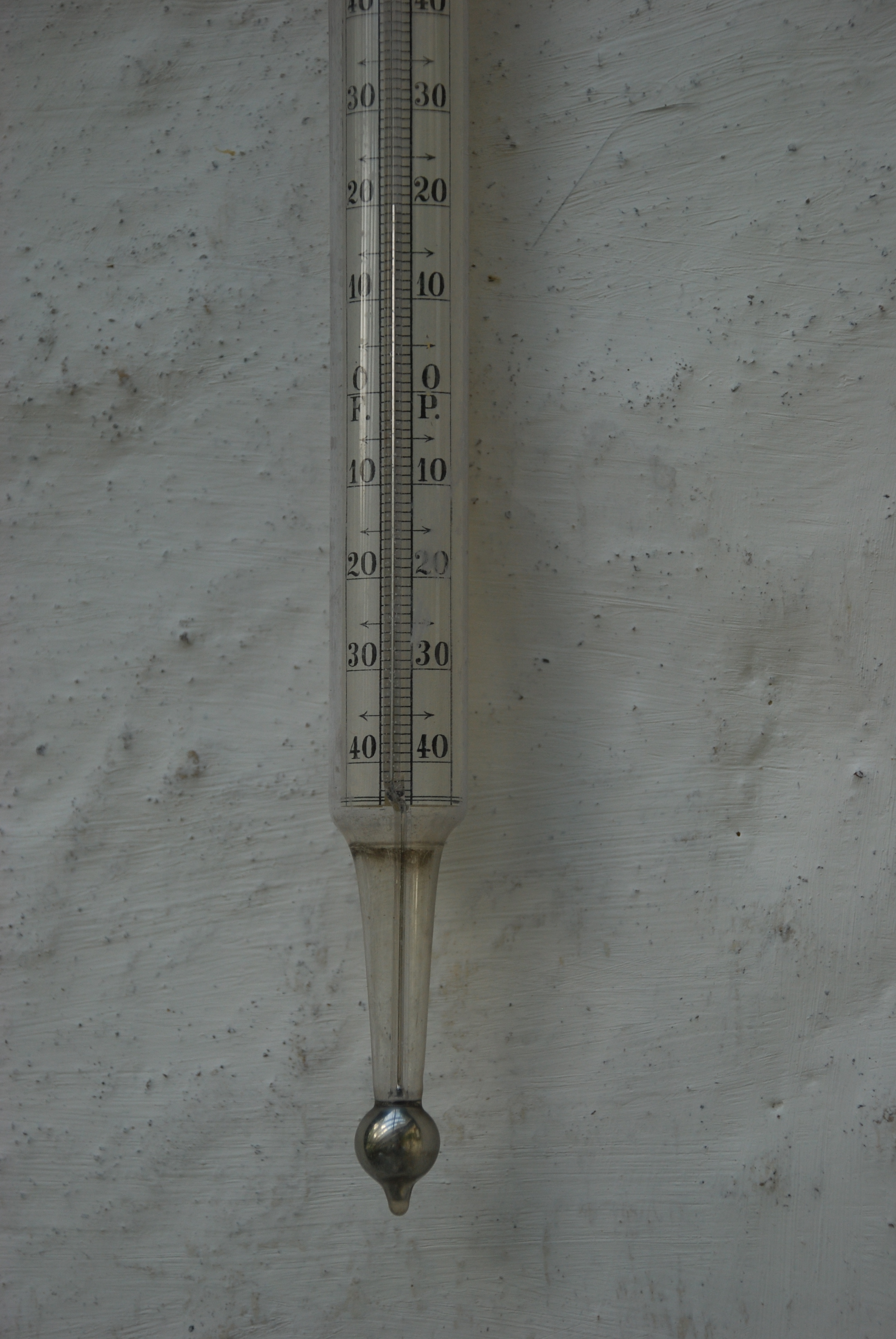
A large mercury-in-glass thermometer.

The earliest documented use of mercury in some kind of thermometer is from the 1620s, when Athanasius Kircher, a Jesuit scholar, used quicksilver for his air thermometer, the precursor to in-glass thermometers. Later, in the 1650s, failed experiments were run to determine if mercury might be a superior substitute for spirits in an enclosed glass thermometer. In 1659, the astronomer Ismael Boulliau abandoned using mercury when he determined that it was not as responsive to changes in temperature as spirits.

In 1713, Daniel Gabriel Fahrenheit began experimenting with mercury thermometers. By 1717, he was making them commercially. The superiority of his mercury thermometers over alcohol-based thermometers made them very popular, leading to the widespread adoption of his Fahrenheit scale, the measurement system he developed and used for his thermometers.

Anders Celsius, a Swedish scientist, devised the Celsius scale, which was described in his publication The origin of the Celsius temperature scale in 1742.

To define his scale Celsius used two fixed temperature points: the temperature of melting ice and the temperature of boiling water, both under atmospheric pressure of the standard atmosphere. This was not a new idea, since Isaac Newton was already working on something similar. The distinction of Celsius was to use the condition of melting and not that of freezing. The experiments for reaching a good calibration of his thermometer lasted for 2 winters. By performing the same experiment over and over again, he discovered that ice always melted at the same calibration mark on the thermometer. He found a similar fixed point in the calibration of boiling water to water vapour (when this is done to high precision, a variation will be seen with atmospheric pressure; Celsius noted this). At the moment that he removed the thermometer from the vapour, the mercury level climbed slightly. This was related to the rapid cooling (and contraction) of the glass.

When Celsius decided to use his own temperature scale, he originally defined his scale "upside-down", that is he chose to set the boiling point of pure water at 0 °C (212 °F) and the freezing point at 100 °C (32 °F). One year later, Frenchman Jean-Pierre Christin proposed to invert the scale with the freezing point at 0 °C (32 °F) and the boiling point at 100 °C (212 °F). He named it centigrade (100 steps).

Finally, Celsius proposed a method of calibrating a thermometer:

1. Place the cylinder of the thermometer in melting ice made of pure water and mark the point where the fluid in the thermometer stabilises. This point is the freeze/thaw point of water.
2. In the same manner mark the point where the fluid stabilises when the thermometer is placed in boiling water vapour.
3. Divide the length between the two marks into 100 equal parts.

These points are adequate for approximate calibration, but both the freezing and boiling points of water vary with atmospheric pressure. Later thermometers that used a liquid other than mercury also gave slightly different temperature readings. In practice, these variations were very slight and remained close to the thermodynamic temperature, once the latter was discovered. These issues were explored experimentally with the gas thermometer. Until the discovery of true thermodynamic temperature, the mercury thermometer usually defined the temperature.

Modern thermometers are often calibrated using the triple point of water instead of the freezing point; the triple point occurs at 273.16 kelvins (K), 0.01 °C.

== Maximum thermometer ==
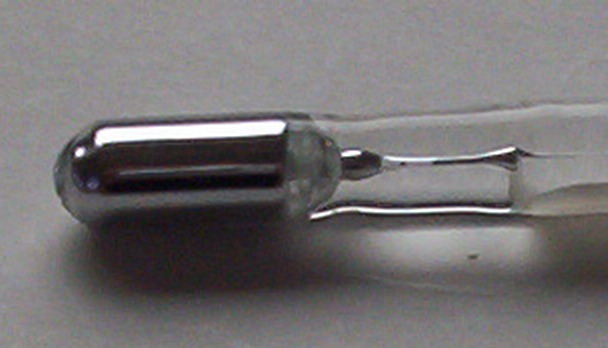
Closeup of a maximum thermometer. The break in the column of mercury is visible.

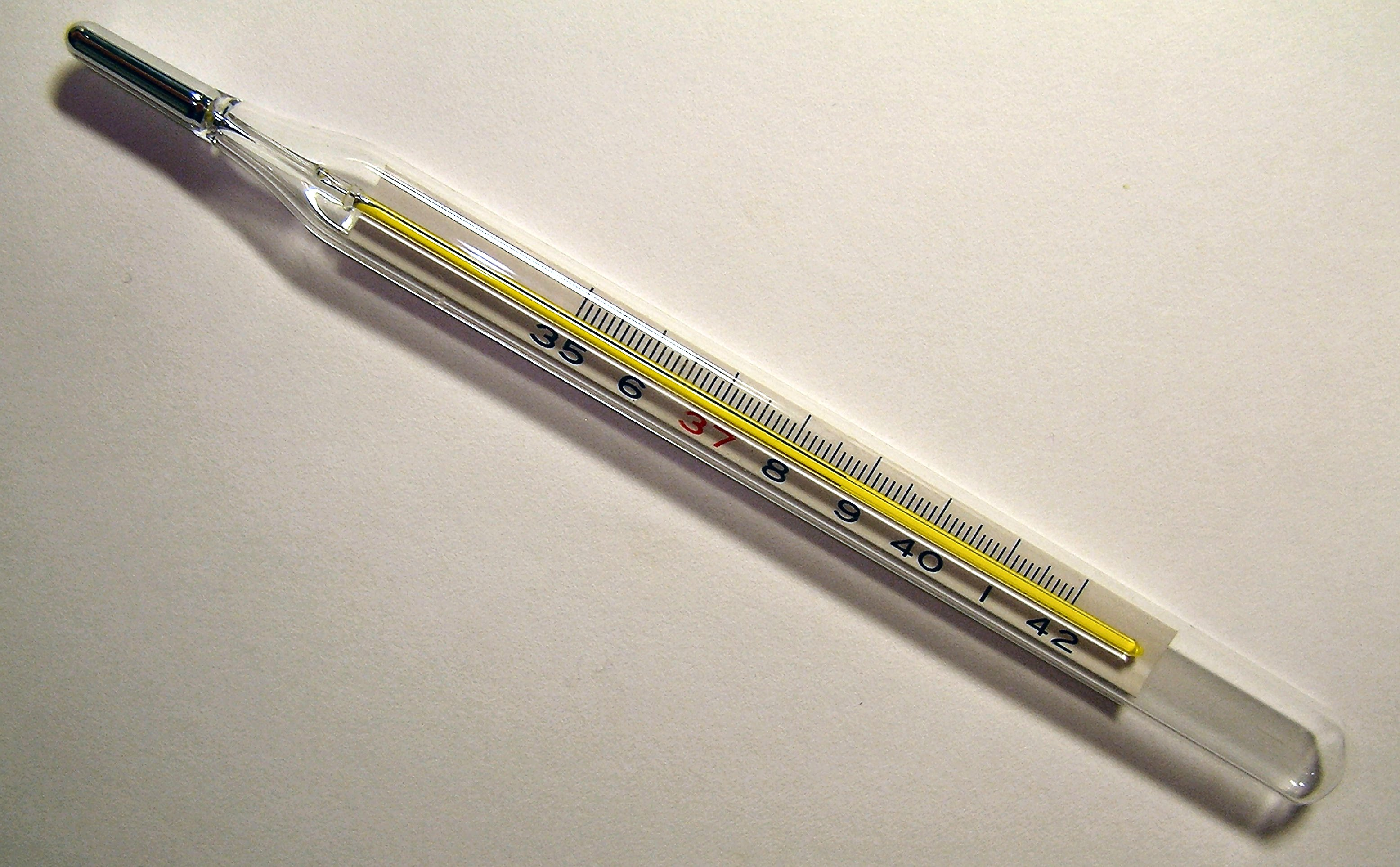
A medical mercury-in-glass maximum thermometer showing the temperature of 38.7 °C (101.7 °F).

One special kind of mercury-in-glass thermometer, called a maximum thermometer, works by having a constriction in the neck close to the bulb. As the temperature rises, the mercury is pushed up through the constriction by the force of expansion. When the temperature falls, the column of mercury breaks at the constriction and cannot return to the bulb, thus remaining stationary in the tube. The observer can then read the maximum temperature over the set period of time. To reset the thermometer it must be swung sharply. This design is used in the traditional type of medical thermometer.

== Maximum minimum thermometer ==
A maximum minimum thermometer, also known as Six's thermometer, is a thermometer which registers the maximum and minimum temperatures reached over a period of time, typically 24 hours. The original design contains mercury, but solely as a way to indicate the position of a column of alcohol whose expansion indicates the temperature; it is not a thermometer operated by the expansion of mercury; mercury-free versions are available.

== Physical properties ==
Mercury thermometers cover a wide temperature range from −37 to 356 °C (−35 to 673 °F); the instrument's upper temperature range may be extended through the introduction of an inert gas such as nitrogen. This introduction of an inert gas increases the pressure on the liquid mercury and therefore its boiling point is increased, this in combination with replacing the Pyrex glass with fused quartz allows the upper temperature range to be extended to 800 °C (1,470 °F).

Mercury cannot be used below the temperature at which it becomes solid, −38.83 °C (−37.89 °F). If the thermometer contains nitrogen, the gas may flow down into the column when the mercury solidifies and be trapped there when the temperature rises, making the thermometer unusable until returned to the factory for reconditioning. To avoid this, some weather services require that all mercury-in-glass thermometers be brought indoors when the temperature falls to −37 °C (−35 °F).

To measure lower meteorological temperatures, a thermometer containing a mercury-thallium alloy which does not solidify until the temperature drops to −61.1 °C (−78.0 °F) may be used.

== Phase-out ==
As of 2026, many mercury-in-glass thermometers are used in meteorology; however, they are becoming increasingly rare for other uses, as many countries banned them for medical use due to the toxicity of mercury. Some manufacturers use galinstan, a liquid alloy of gallium, indium, and tin, or propylene carbonate, as a replacement for mercury.

The typical "fever thermometer" contains between 0.5 and 3 g (0.28 and 1.69 drachms) of elemental mercury. Swallowing this amount of mercury would pose little danger but the inhaling of the vapour could lead to health problems.

=== List of countries with regulations or recommendations on mercury thermometers ===
Map of the countries of the European Union that banned mercury-in-glass thermometers according to Directive 2007/51/EC as of 22 January 2013. Countries in blue have made legal bans on the issue, countries in gray are of unknown status at the present, and countries in red are those whose "Member State does not consider national execution measures necessary."

==== Argentina ====
In February 2009, the Argentine Health Ministry instructed by resolution 139/09 that all health centres and hospitals should buy mercury-free thermometers and blood pressure meters and called on dentists, medical technicians, and environmental health specialists to start eliminating this toxin. As of 2020, mercury thermometers were still on sale to the public at pharmacies.

==== Austria ====
There was a voluntary take-back action for thermometers containing mercury based on the Federal Waste Management Plan 2006, and carried out in close cooperation between the Austrian Chamber of Pharmacists (Österreichische Apothekerkammer), the Federal Ministry of Environment, a private waste disposer, a producer of electronic thermometers and a pharmaceutical distributor. The disposal company supplied each pharmacy (approximately 1,200) with a collection bin and covered the cost of disposal. The pharmaceutical distributor covered the logistical costs for the distribution of the thermometers. The pharmacies accepted a refund of only 0.50 Euro per thermometer for handling (which is far below their normal margin). The supplier provided the thermometers at a reduced price. The Federal Ministry supported each sold thermometer (covering about 30% of the direct costs) and advertised the project. During the collection period, consumers could bring in a mercury thermometer and buy an electronic thermometer for a subsidised price of 1 Euro. Between October 2007 and January 2008, about 465,000 electronic thermometers were sold and about one million mercury thermometers (together containing about 1 tonne of mercury) were collected.

==== Philippines ====
By the Philippines Department of Health’s Administrative Order 2008-0221, all mercury equipment from hospitals, including mercury-in-glass thermometers, was to be phased out in the Philippines by September 28, 2010. Even before the order was released, 50 hospitals had already banned mercury from their establishments. Among these fifty hospitals, the Philippine Heart Center was the first one to do so. San Juan de Dios Hospital, Philippine Children’s Medical Center, San Lazaro Hospital, Ospital ng Muntinlupa, Lung Center of the Philippines, the National Kidney and Transplant Institute, Manila Adventist Medical Center and Las Piñas Hospital also made steps to ban the toxic chemical. The country was the first one to make a step to ban mercury from its health care system in Southeast Asia and they used non-mercury digital thermometers instead.

==== United Kingdom ====
Since European Union directive 2007/51/EC came into force on 3 April 2009, the UK Health Protection Agency (HPA) reported that mercury thermometers could no longer be sold to the general public. Shops holding stocks of unsold thermometers had to withdraw them from sale; mercury thermometers purchased before this date could be used without legal implications. The purpose of these restrictions is to protect the environment and public health by decreasing the amount of mercury waste released. The HPA had, in 2007, released a guide to dealing with small spills of mercury.

Despite the phasing-out of mercury thermometers in the United Kingdom, British media continues to refer to temperature measurements, especially for weather forecasts, as "the mercury".

==== United States ====
In the United States, both the American Academy of Pediatrics and the United States Environmental Protection Agency recommend that alternative thermometers be used in the home.

== See also ==
- Mercury probe, an electrical probing device to sample for electrical characterization
- Mercury switch, an electrical circuit, on-off switch using the element mercury
- Mercury swivel commutator, an electrical circuit, current-reversing switch using the element mercury
- Mercury vapour turbine, a rotary engine to produce electricity from mercury vapor
