= Pill thermometer =

Ingestible thermometer

A pill thermometer is an ingestible thermometer that allows a person's core temperature to be continuously monitored. It was developed by NASA in collaboration with Johns Hopkins University for use with astronauts. Since then the pill has been used by mountain climbers, football players, cyclists, F1 drivers, and in the mining industry.

The Thermometer Pill is currently manufactured by the company HQ Inc under the brand name CorTemp.
