= Alcohol thermometer =

Alternative to the mercury thermometer

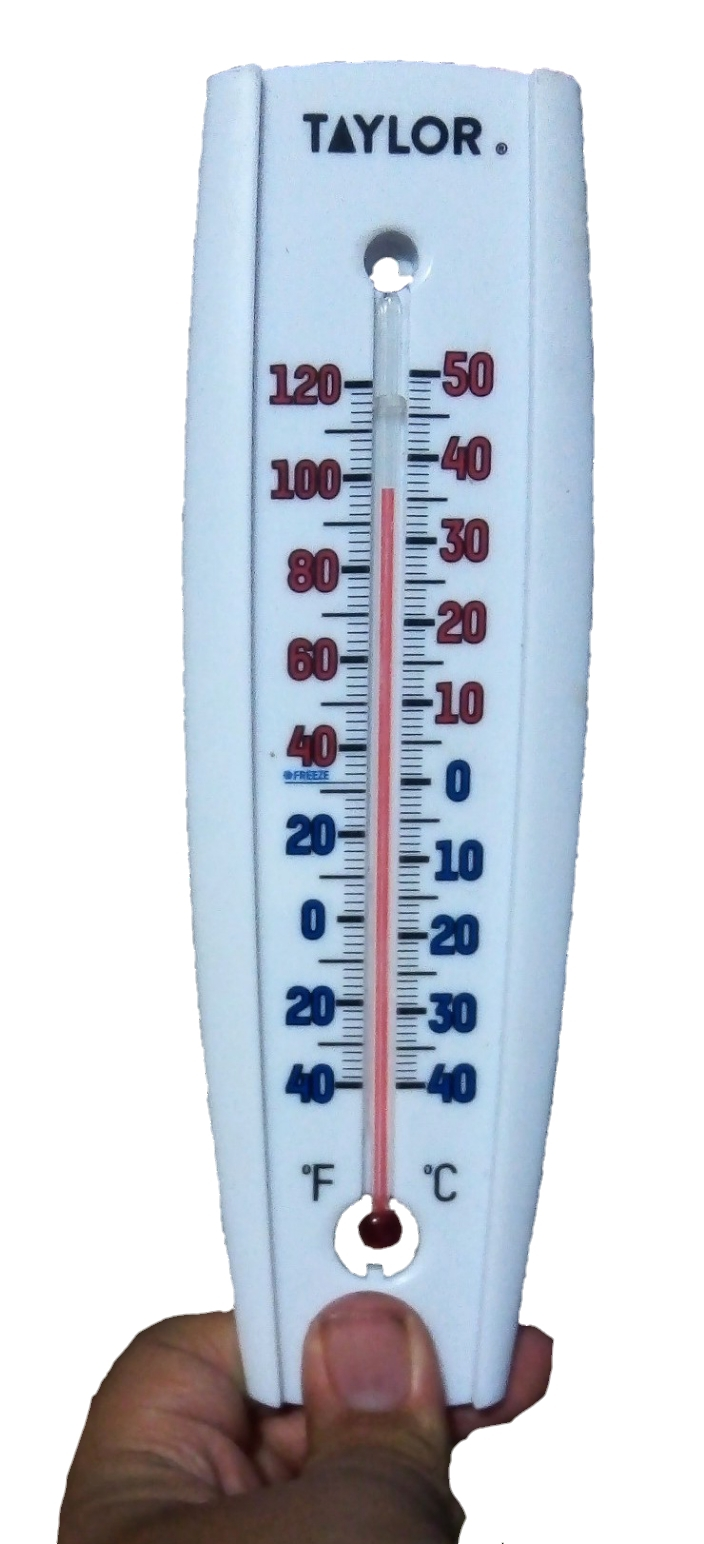

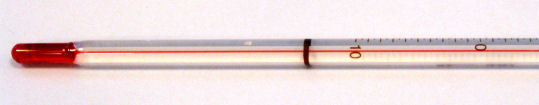
Alcohol thermometer

The alcohol thermometer or spirit thermometer has a similar construction and theory of operation as a mercury-in-glass thermometer. However, the thermometric fluid of an alcohol thermometer is less toxic and evaporates quickly making it a safer alternative to mercury thermometers. The ethanol version is the most widely used due to the low cost and relatively low hazard posed by the liquid in case of breakage.

An organic liquid is contained in a glass bulb which is connected to a capillary of the same glass and the end is sealed with an expansion bulb. The space above the liquid is a mixture of nitrogen and the vapor of the liquid. For the working temperature range, the meniscus or interface between the liquid and gas/vapor is within the capillary. With increasing temperature, the volume of liquid expands and the meniscus moves up the capillary. The position of the meniscus shows the temperature against an inscribed scale.

The liquid used can be pure ethanol, toluene, kerosene or isoamyl acetate, depending on manufacturer and working temperature range. Since these are transparent, the liquid is made more visible by the addition of a red or blue dye. One half of the glass containing the capillary is usually enamelled white or yellow to give a background for reading the scale.

The range of usefulness of the thermometer is set by the boiling point of the liquid used. In the case of the ethanol-filled thermometer, the upper limit for measurement is 78 °C (172.4 °F), which makes it useful for measuring daytime, nighttime and body temperatures, although not for anything much hotter than these.

Ethanol-filled thermometers are used in preference to mercury for meteorological measurements of minimum temperatures and can be used down to −70 °C (−94 °F). The physical limitation of the ability of a thermometer to measure low temperature is the freezing point of the liquid used. Ethanol freezes at −114.9 °C (−174.82 °F). If an alcohol thermometer utilizes a combination of ethanol, toluene, and pentane, its lower temperature range may be extended to measure temperatures down to as low as −200 °C (−328 °F). However, the measurement temperature range of circa −200 °C to 78 °C is highly dependent upon the type of alcohol used.

== History ==
The alcohol thermometer was the earliest efficient, modern-style instrument of temperature measurement. As is the case with many early, important inventions, several people are credited with the invention. These include Ferdinando II de' Medici, Grand Duke of Tuscany, who in 1654 made sealed tubes partly filled with alcohol, with a bulb and stem, depending on the expansion of a liquid, and independent of air pressure. Other sources credit Daniel Gabriel Fahrenheit with inventing the alcohol thermometer in 1709, but many, such as the Encyclopædia Britannica, only credit Fahrenheit with improving upon already existing designs of alcohol thermometers. Fahrenheit was a skilled glassblower and his alcohol thermometer was the world's first reliable thermometer.
