= Cryometer =

A cryometer is a thermometer used to measure very low temperatures of objects. Ethanol-filled thermometers are used in preference to mercury for meteorological measurements and can measure temperatures in the range of −38 to 70 °C (−36 to 158 °F). Their main physical limitation is the freezing and boiling point of the liquid used.

There are many types of devices used as cryometers to measure temperatures below the freezing point of common liquids:

1. thermocouples: these can be used down to measure about 1 K temperature.
2. vapour pressure thermometers: these can be used to measure temperatures down to about 0.5K
3. resistance thermometers: these can be used to measure temperatures at 0.01 K.
4. melting curve thermometers: these can be used to measure temperatures between about 0.001K and 0.5K
5. resistance noise thermometers: these can be used to down to about 0.001K
6. magnetic thermometers: which are used at 0.001 K temperatures.
7. nuclear-resonance thermometers: these are required to measure very low temperatures such as 0.0000001 K.

  Thermometer Type	Down to Kelvin	Up to
         thermocouples	1	
         vapor pressure	0.5	
                  resistance	0.01	
                    magnetic	0.001	
           melting curve	0.001	                    0.5K
     resistance noise	0.001	
nuclear-resonance	0.0000001	

<bk>
