= Nanothermometry =

Nanothermometry is a branch of physics and engineering exploring the use of non-invasive precise thermometers working at the nanoscale. These devices have high spatial resolution (below one micrometer), where conventional methods are ineffective.

== Sensitivity of a nanothermometer ==
The sensitivity is a parameter that characterizes a thermometer giving information about the relative change on the output of the thermometer per degree of temperature change. Numerically, it can be computed using the calibration curve (temperature dependence of the thermometric parameter, Q)

$$S_r = \frac{dQ/dT}{Q} .$$

As S_{r} have small values, usually it is expressed as a percentage, like 1.0%· K^{−1}, meaning that a degree change in temperature will be measured in the thermometric parameter as a change of 1.0%. This quantity is telling to determine the appropriate detector to be used in order to measure the temperature from the thermometric parameter change.

== Luminescent nanothermometers ==
The well-known limitations of contact thermometers to work at submicron scale lead to the development of non-contact thermometry techniques, such as, IR thermography, thermoreflectance, optical interferometry, Raman spectroscopy, and luminescence. Luminescence nanothermometry exploits the relationship between temperature and luminescence properties to achieve thermal sensing from the spatial and spectral analysis of the light generated from the object to be thermally imaged.
