= Indoor–outdoor thermometer =

Type of temperature measuring device

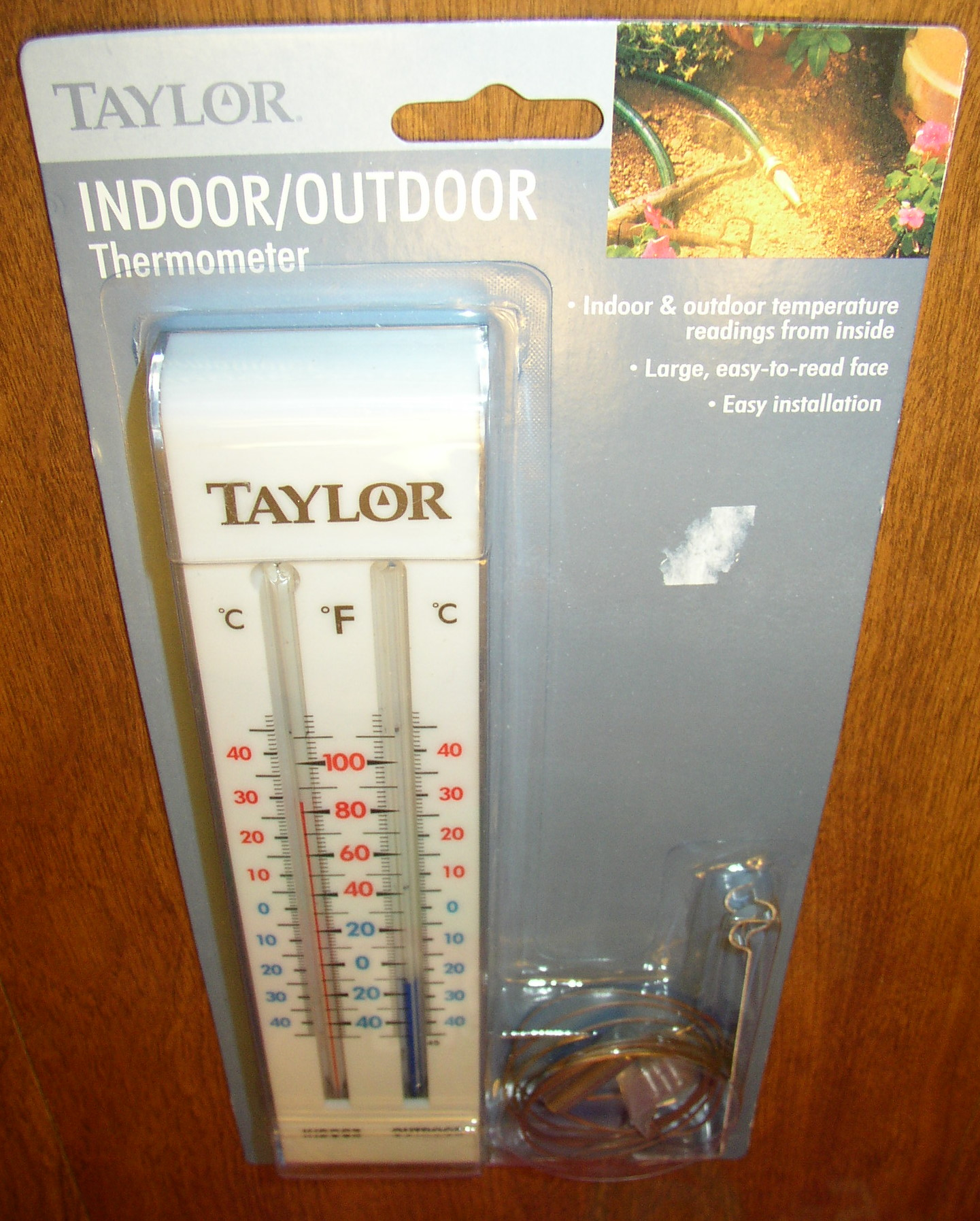
Indoor-outdoor thermometer

An indoor–outdoor thermometer is a thermometer that simultaneously provides a measurement of the indoor and outdoor temperatures. The outdoor part of the thermometer requires some kind of remote temperature sensing device. Conventionally, this was done by extending the bulb of the thermometer to the remote site. Modern instruments are more likely to use some form of electronic transducer.

== Glass thermometer ==
In an indoor–outdoor thermometer based on a conventional liquid-in-glass thermometer, the stem of the outdoor thermometer is connected to the bulb by a long, flexible or semi-rigid capillary. The temperature scale is marked on the stem as usual. However, the temperature that is actually measured is the temperature at the bulb.

Ambient corrections are difficult to achieve with this system and are not usually done. So it is not as accurate as a conventional precision thermometer. Rather, it is typically used for low-cost applications such as private houses. The main issue with accuracy is that if the bulb and the stem are at different levels, there is a change in reading due to the change in pressure head. A further problem is that changes in the ambient temperature of the indoor part of the device can cause a change in reading as well as the temperature of the outdoor part of the device. This effect can be minimised by making the bulb large and the capillary a small diameter. This ensures that changes in the outside temperature produce large changes in the column of liquid in the stem and will tend to swamp the smaller changes caused by the changes in the indoor temperature.

Common working liquids used are toluene and alcohol. Both of these have large temperature coefficients of expansion and do not freeze or boil in the temperature range of interest.

== Electronic types ==
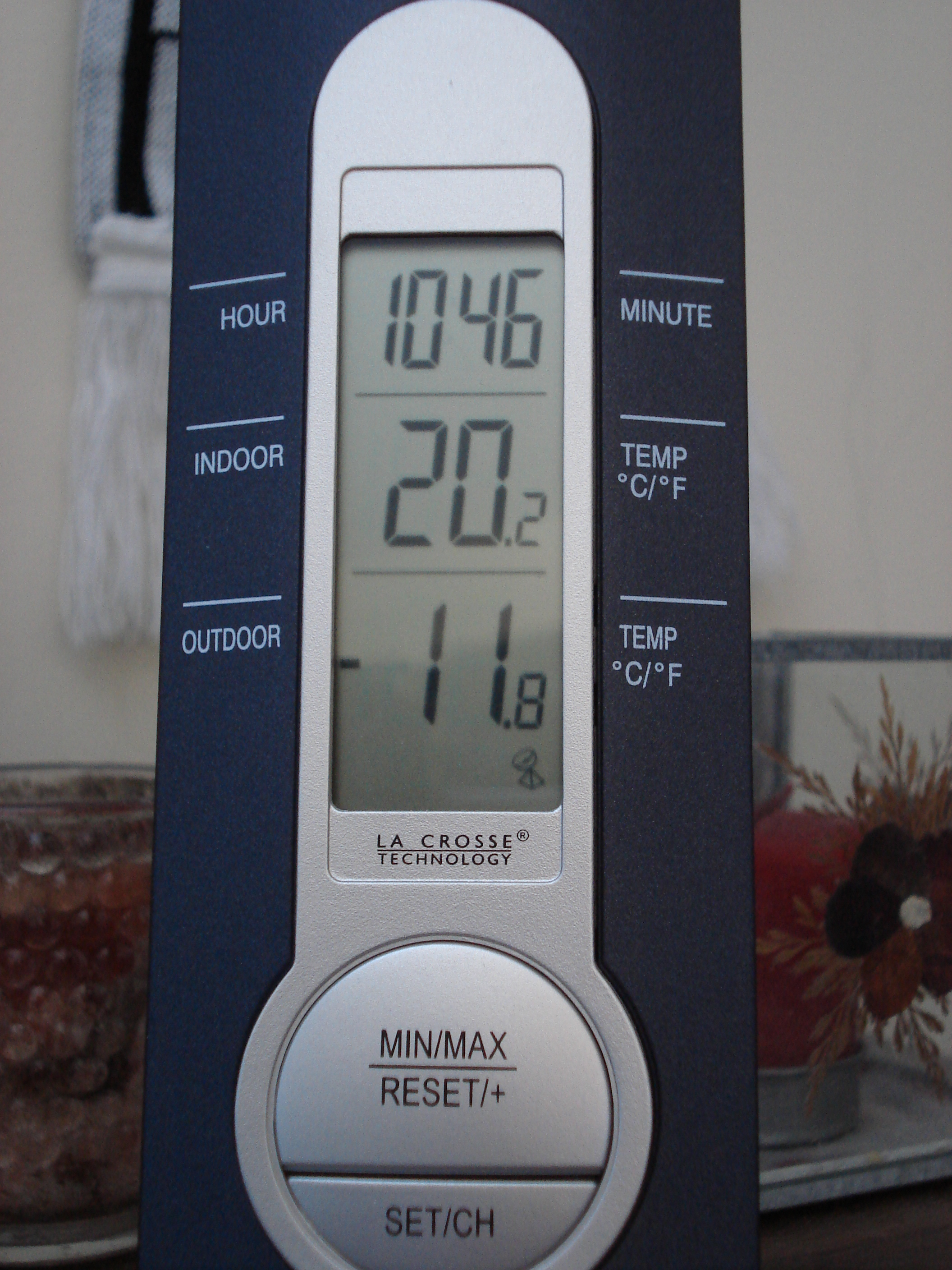
Wireless indoor-outdoor thermometer

The sensors can be any of the types used in electronic thermometers. Thermistors are common and semiconductor junctions can also be used. Indoor-outdoor electronic thermometers are a frequent hobbyist project and are sometimes sold as kits. Many indoor-outdoor thermometers on sale are wireless devices requiring no physical connection to the sensor placed outside. In these cases the sensor needs to be battery-powered.

== Applications ==
The primary purpose of the indoor-outdoor thermometer is to allow the outside temperature to be indicated inside a building, thus removing the need to go outside to take a temperature reading. They are also used in vehicles, and are particularly useful for municipal vehicles involved in snow and ice clearance. Building maintenance engineers can use an indoor-outdoor thermometer that has not been installed to get a quick reading of air temperature in a location inside a building. This is done by swinging the bulb of the outdoor sensor in the air while still attached to the instrument. This will get a faster reading because the bulb will come up to temperature much more quickly than the indoor sensor built into the instrument.

== Bibliography ==
- Curl, Robert S., Building Owner's and Manager's Guide: Optimizing Facility Performance, Fairmont Press, 1998 ISBN 0-88173-290-7.
- Graf, Rudolf F.; Whalen, George J., "Build your own indoor-outdoor electronic thermometer", Popular Mechanics, vol.133, no. 2, pp. 150–152, February 1970 ISSN 0032-4558.
- Hawkins, W. J., "Digital thermometer from a kit", Popular Science, vol.204, no. 3, p. 90, March 1974 ISSN 0161-7370.
- Lamb, Robert, "How weather gadgets work", p. 2, How Stuff Works, retrieved and archived 3 January 2012.
- McGee, Thomas Donald, Principles and Methods of Temperature Measurement, Wiley-IEEE, 1988 ISBN 0-471-62767-4.
- Minsk, L. David, Snow and Ice Control Manual for Transportation Facilities, McGraw-Hill Professional, 1998 ISBN 0-07-042809-3.
