= Mood ring =

Ring that contains a thermochromic element

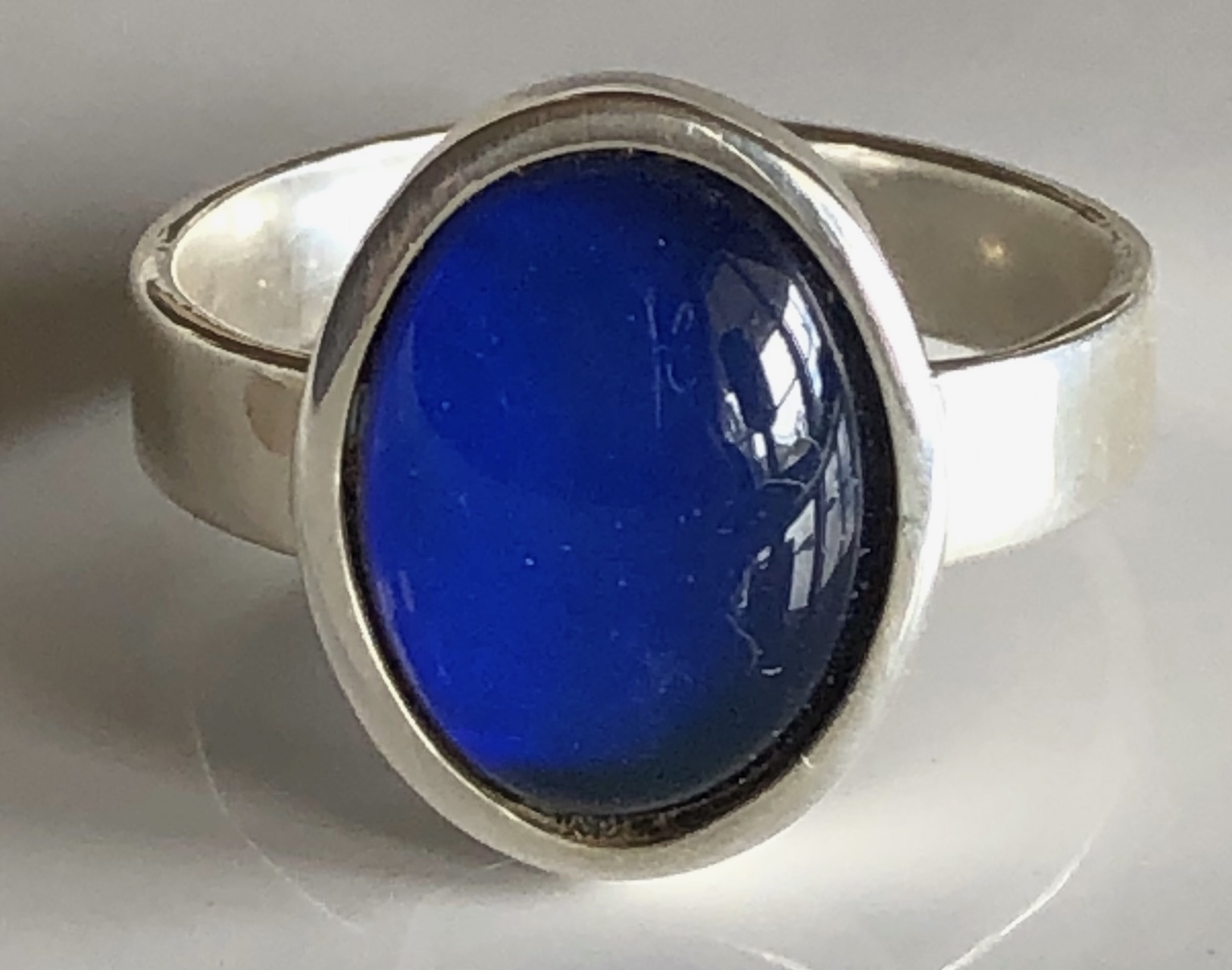
The original "mood ring" introduced as the Mood Stone in 1975.

A mood ring is a finger ring that contains a thermochromic element that changes colors based on the temperature of the finger of the wearer. A mood stone is a thermochromic element in an accessory. Finger temperature, as long as the ambient temperature is relatively constant, is significantly determined by peripheral blood flow. The thermochromic element is in the form of thermotropic liquid crystals that change color in response to changes in temperature.

== History ==
The idea to use thermosensitive elements in jewelry first arose from the American jeweler Marvin Wernick in 1974 after reading a magazine article about the use of liquid crystal elements in medical thermometers. He found a compound that changed color from black to green, blue and deep blue in the range of 32–38 °C (90–100 °F) and in January 1975 developed a technique for using it in pendants and rings. Sales began in February. Wernick called the jewelry "magical", and his promotional materials claimed that the color of the pendant or ring is an indicator of the warmth of the wearer's character. Since Wernick did not patent the invention, other jewelers adopted the idea and began to produce their thermosensitive jewelry. The more common term mood ring was coined soon after, and was quickly adopted by all manufacturers, including Wernick.

Important producers of mood rings were Joshua Reynolds and Maris Ambats; many sources credit them as their inventor. Reynolds called the rings "a real biofeedback tool" that allows a person to get additional information about their body. In December 1975 the total value of the rings sold reached $15 million. However, in mid-December, the demand for rings suddenly fell as the market was oversaturated, and companies that did not have time to sell rings suffered losses. After a couple of years, mood rings went out of fashion.

== Later appearances ==
After the original 1970s fad, mood rings continued to be available at youth and novelty retailers such as Spencer Gifts and Claire's. This resulted in them being treated as a familiar Y2K aesthetic accessory in later fashion coverage. Digital versions of the mood ring appeared online, including one incarnation in Google Toolbar.

== Color and biofeedback ==
Mood-ring colours were not standardized and depend on the specific compounds used in their version of the production, although many charts associate cooler colors with negative emotions and warmer colors with positive emotions.

== See also ==
- Biorhythm (pseudoscience)
- Liquid crystal thermometer
- Methods of divination

== Sources ==
- Sagert, K. B. (2007). "Fads: Mood Rings". The 1970s. Greenwood Press. p. 126—127. ISBN 978-0313339196.
- Shook, R. L. (1982). "Why didn't I think of that!". The Mood Ring. New American Library. p. 38—49. ISBN 0453004199.
