= Mercury probe =

Device for characterization of samples

The mercury probe is an electrical probing device to make rapid, non-destructive contact to a sample for electrical characterization. Its primary application is semiconductor measurements where otherwise time-consuming metallizations or photolithographic processing are required to make contact to a sample. These processing steps usually take hours and have to be avoided where possible to reduce device processing times.

The mercury probe applies mercury contacts of well-defined areas to a flat sample. The nature of the mercury-sample contacts and the instrumentation connected to the mercury probe define the application. If the mercury-sample contact is ohmic (non-rectifying) then current-voltage instrumentation can be used to measure resistance, leakage currents, or current-voltage characteristics. Resistance can be measured on bulk samples or on thin films. The thin films can be composed of any material that does not react with mercury. Metals, semiconductors, oxides, and chemical coatings have all been measured successfully.

== Applications ==
The mercury probe is a versatile tool for investigation of parameters of conducting, insulating and semiconductor materials.

One of the first successful mercury probe applications was the characterization of epitaxial layers grown on silicon. It is critical to device performance to monitor the doping level and thickness of an epitaxial layer. Prior to the mercury probe, a sample had to undergo a metallization process, which could take hours. A mercury probe connected to capacitance-voltage doping profile instrumentation could measure an epitaxial layer as soon as it came out of the epitaxial reactor. The mercury probe formed a Schottky barrier of well-defined area that could be measured as easily as a conventional metallized contact.

Another mercury probe application popular for it speed is oxide characterization. The mercury probe forms a gate contact and enables measurement of the capacitance-voltage or current-voltage parameters of the mercury-oxide-semiconductor structure. Using this device, material parameters such as permittivity, doping, oxide charge, and dielectric strength may be evaluated. The contact area of a mercury droplet resting on a semiconductor can be modified by electrowetting, meaning that accurate parameter extraction may need to take this effect into account.

A mercury probe with concentric dot and ring contacts as well as a back contact extends mercury probe applications to silicon on insulator (SOI) structures, where a pseudo-MOSFET device is formed. This Hg-FET can be used to study mobility, interface trap density, and transconductance.

The same mercury-sample structures can be measured with capacitance-voltage instrumentation to monitor permittivity and thickness of dielectric materials. These measurements are a convenient gauge for development of novel dielectrics of both low-k and high-k types.

If the mercury-sample contact is rectifying then a diode has formed and offers other measurement possibilities. Current-voltage measurements of the diode can reveal properties of the semiconductor such as breakdown voltage and lifetime. Capacitance-voltage measurements allow computation of the semiconductor doping level and uniformity. These measurements are successfully made on many materials including SiC, GaAs, GaN, InP, CdS, and InSb.

== See also ==
- Capacitance–voltage profiling
- Schottky barrier
- Metal–semiconductor junction
- Semiconductor device fabrication
- Electrowetting
- Silicon on insulator
