= Fiber-optical thermometer =

Fiber-optical thermometers can be used in electromagnetically strongly influenced environment, in microwave fields, power plants or explosion-proof areas and wherever measurement with electrical temperature sensors are not possible.

== Structure ==
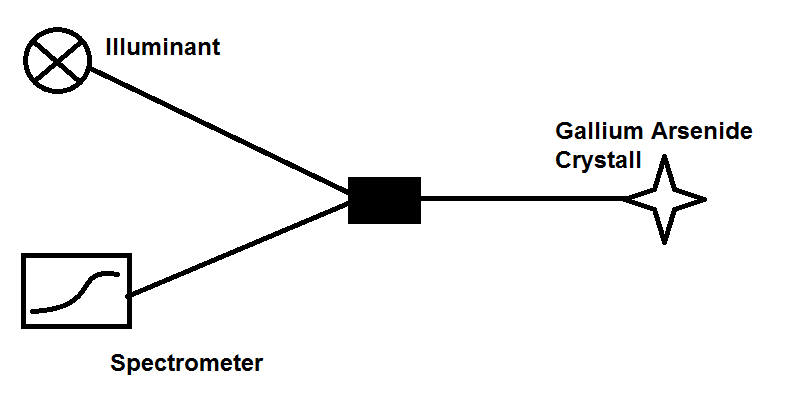
Structure new

One type of fibre optic temperature probe consists of a gallium arsenide (GaAs) semiconductor crystal that is mounted on the end of an optical fibre. The probe is completely non-metallic. The fibre optical sensor is completely non-conductive and offers complete immunity to RFI, EMI, NMR and microwave radiation with high temperature operating capability, intrinsic safety, and non-invasive use.

== Measurement principle ==
The principle of operation is based on the temperature dependence of the bandgap of GaAs. The GaAs crystal fixed on the tip of the fibre will be transparent at a wavelength above 850 nm. The position of the band edge is temperature-dependent and is shifted about 0.4 nm/K. The light is directed via the optical fibre to the crystal, where it is absorbed and partially reflected into the fibre. A miniature spectrometer provides a spectrum with the position of the band edge, from which the temperature is calculated.

== Applications ==
=== Medical ===
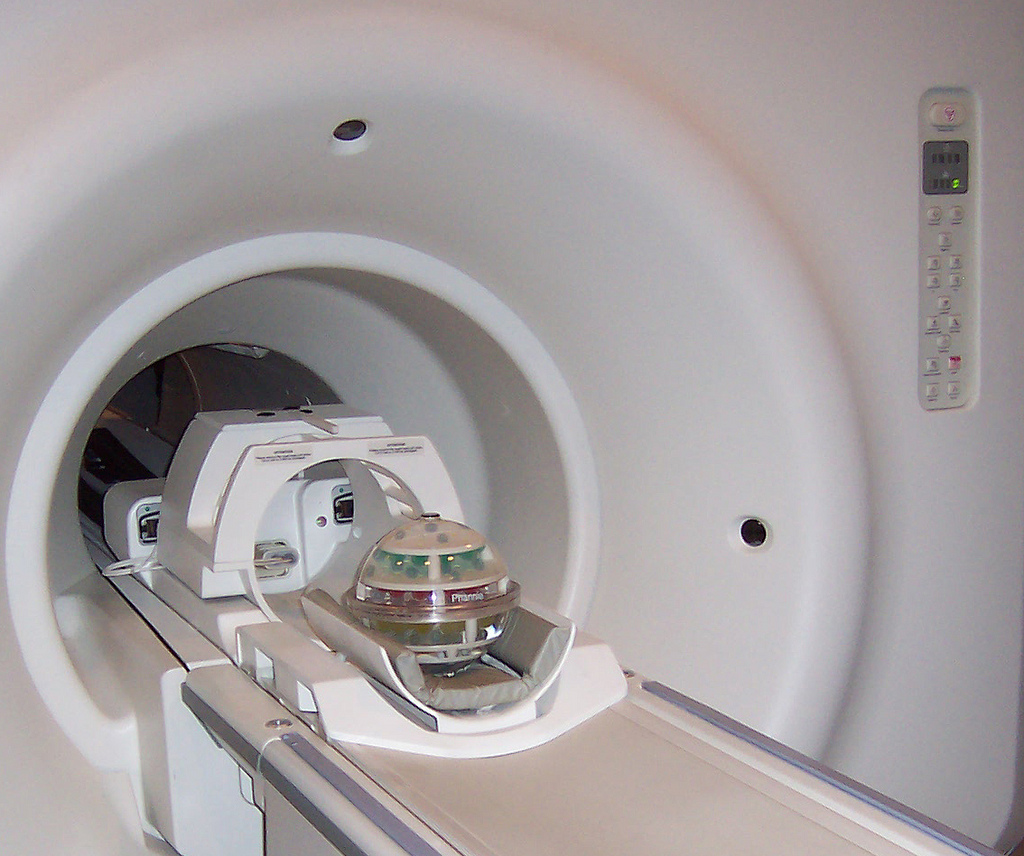
MRI Tomograph

Fibre optic sensors offer complete immunity to RF and microwave radiation with high temperature operating capability, so they can be used for measurement on patients and materials in magnetic resonance scanner (MRI). In strong magnetic fields, there is a small offset in the temperature reading approximately proportional to the strength of the magnetic field squared. The magnitude of the offset is also affected by the orientation of the GaAs crystal within the magnetic field, the geometry of the GaAs crystal, and impurities in the GaAs. Metallic sensors can breed errors at the image acquisition. For special cancer treatment sensors with a diameter of 0.5 mm are available. These can be used minimally invasive for monitoring of tissue temperature. Another application of fibre optical measurement technique is laser therapy. Through an endoscope, laser energy is coupled and the temperature will be measured via a fibre optic probe at the location of therapy.

=== Environmental ===
Industrial areas often contaminate the soil with oil, toxic and persistent organic compounds. To clear these fields, soil heating by radio waves is frequently used. Fibre optical sensors are deployed to monitor and control this process. A high-power generator will deliver energy in the radio frequency range. The polluted soil is covered with electrodes, which will heat the surface dielectric. Besides, several fibre optical probes are put in the soil. Depending on the measured value different values of temperature and temperature distribution can be realized in the soil. Depending on the level of contamination the temperature will be increased slightly to activate a higher decomposition of soil organisms, alternatively, the soil water will condensate in a temperature range up to 150 °C together with non-steam resistant organic contaminations. A perforated soil air extraction system takes the steams away and recirculates them into a filter system.

=== Chemical and petrochemical ===
Fibre optic temperature probes are designed to withstand harsh and corrosive environments. The sensors are intrinsically safe. There are no components that create sparks, leading to explosions. They consist of completely non-conductive components and can therefore be used in hazardous areas. They can have a length up to 2.5 miles so that the analysis can be placed outside the hazardous area.

=== Microwave and radiofrequency environments ===
In microwave heated installations chemical digestion under pressure and temperature for the determination of trace and ultra-trace analysis in downstream processes will be executed, for that reason, it was found that under certain pressure and temperature conditions, the yield or efficiency of extraction or digestion processes could be significantly improved. So fibre optical temperature sensors are the only way to control temperatures in microwave chemistry.

=== Generator and transformer ===
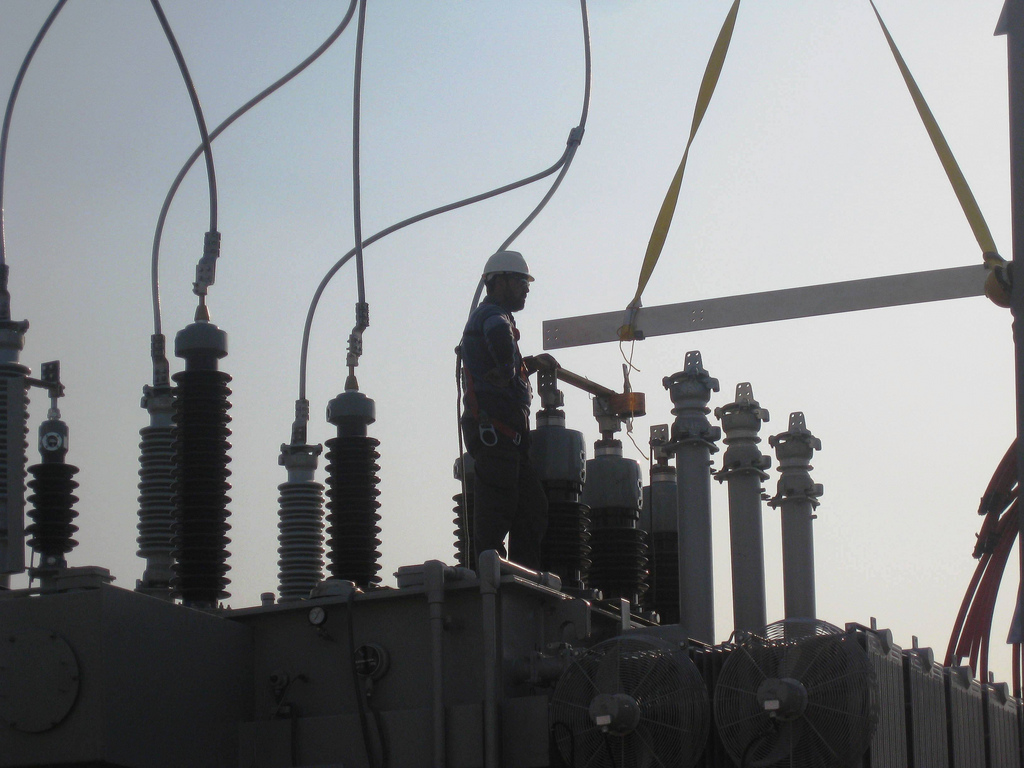
Generating Station

The claims of a modern society relating to electricity requirement approach the full capacity of the generating stations. To ensure industrial safety the temperature must be tightly controlled. High power generators are often filled with hydrogen to cool effectively. Besides the heavily contaminated electromagnetic environment, the risk for explosions is high. Only a fibre optical thermometer can be used for measurement in these areas.

=== Wood drying ===
The renovation of wooden structures can control the core temperature of the wood on fibre-optic temperature probe beams in place. The thermal drying of wood components in the installed state between 80 and 95 °C is sufficient to affect the dry rot infestation to combat and prevent damage. The probes used for temperature measurement consist of a jacketed PTFE glass fibres with a GaAs crystals (gallium arsenide) tip and are completely non-metallic.

=== Electric motors ===
In the industry, the machinery and equipment are increasing to the limits of their strength exhausted. An engine with a larger or smaller size can be used to gain or lose a job lead. On the consumer side as well on a high mileage engine value set. Fibre optic temperature measurements without external effects (magnetic fields, radio frequencies, microwaves) can work quickly and easily even in hazardous areas. They can be used easily to measure the stator winding temperature of an engine or the bearing temperature. The sensors help to detect temperature changes quickly to report the fact to initiate preventive measures.

== Fiber optic vendors ==
There is a large number of vendors and distributors all over the world. The measurement principle of the thermometers vary in style, most are actually slight variation of radiation thermometers, other depend upon contact with the object of measurement.
