= Jean-Pierre Christin =

French scientist (1683–1755)

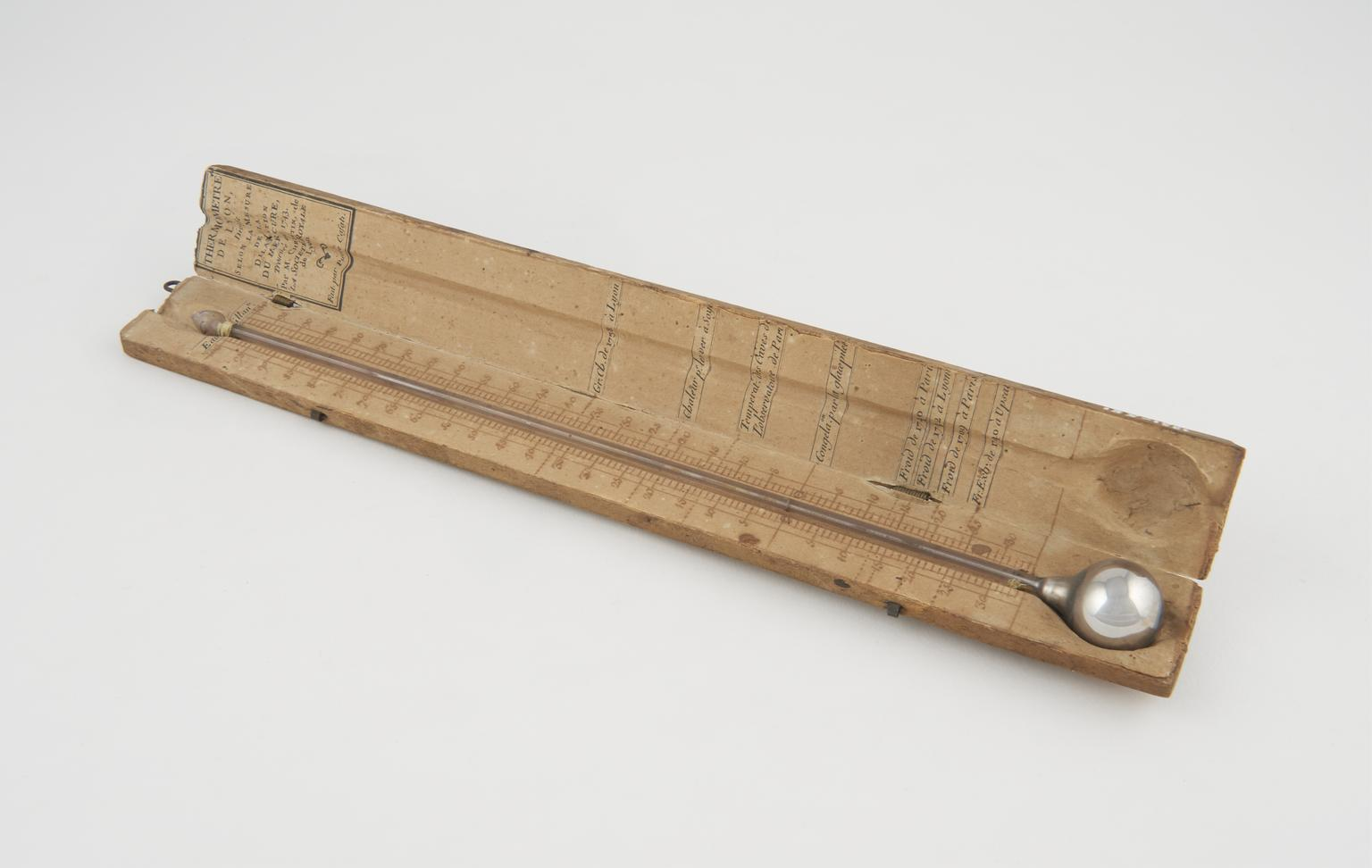
Thermometer of Lyon in the Science Museum in London

Jean-Pierre Christin (31 May 1683 – 19 January 1755) was a French physicist, mathematician, astronomer, and musician. His proposal in 1743 to reverse the Celsius thermometer scale (from water boiling at 0 degrees and ice melting at 100 degrees, to where zero represented the freezing point of water and 100 represented the boiling point of water) was widely accepted and is still in use today.

Christin was born in Lyon, Lyonnais. He was a founding member of the Académie des sciences, belles-lettres et arts de Lyon and served as its Permanent Secretary from 1713 until 1755. His thermometer was known in France before the Revolution as the thermometer of Lyon. One of these thermometers was kept at the Science Museum in London.

== Thermometer of Lyon ==
The first thermometers used in Lyon were made according to the indications of René Antoine Ferchault de Réaumur, who created the alcohol thermometer in 1730 and applied a graduation divided into 80 parts between the melting point of water (0°) and the boiling point (80°).

After experimenting, Christin considered that the mercury thermometer was preferable to the one with alcohol and pronounced in favor of its instrumentation in a conference on 13 June 1740. He noticed the idea of the centesimal division when, in his research, he observed that a quantity of mercury poured into a test tube, first condensed by the cold of crushed ice and then expanded by the heat of boiling water, moved its volume from 66 to 67 parts of the tube and represented them as 6600 and 6700 parts. By registering the mercury dilated in one hundred parts, he found it natural to divide the space traveled by one hundred hundredths, being that these new units, smaller than those of Réaumur, would be more in harmony with the sensations caused by the variations in temperature.

With this in mind, in 1743 he created the mercury-based "thermometer of Lyon" and with its new centigrade degree thermometer with 0 degrees to indicate the temperature at which the water reaches its point of fusion and 100 degrees where it reaches its boiling point.

== Essays ==
- Mémoire sur l'observation d'une éclipse de lune du 18 décembre, et sur quelques particularités relatives à ce phénomène (1732).
- Instrument propre aux opérations de géométrie pratique et d'astronomie (1736).
- Recherches sur les véritables dimensions du pied de roi et du pied de ville (1736).
- Lettre sur l'usage de la jauge de Lyon (1736).
- Parallèle des diverses méthodes de calcul pour mesurer le cercle (1736).
- Démonstration de divers problèmes de géométrie (1737).
- Méthode pour tracer une méridienne par les hauteurs du soleil (1740).
- Observations sur les baromètres de différents genres (1740).
- Fixation de la latitude ou élévation du pôle de Lyon (1745).
- Remarque sur la chaleur naturelle du corps humain, observée par le moyen du thermomètre de Lyon (1747).
- Sur la chaleur directe du soleil, observée par le même instrument (1747).
- Sur la chaleur des eaux minérales de Baréges (1748).
- Expériences sur l'incubation artificielle des œufs de poule, par le moyen de certains degrés de chaleur (1750).
- Expériences sur les aimants naturels et artificiels de diverses grandeurs (1750).
- Sur l'hygromètre (1750).

== Bibliography ==
- Joseph Jean Baptiste Xavier Fournet: Sur l'invention du thermomètre centigrade à mercure: faite à Lyon par M. Christin, 1845
- François Casati, Le thermomètre de Lyon, Lyon, Editions lyonnaises d'art et d'histoire, 1992
