= Joachim Dalencé =

French meteorologist

Joachim d'Alencé or Joachim Dalence (c. 1640 – 1707) was a French scientist known only from books on meteorological instruments. He was among the first to consider the use of two standards for graduating a thermometer scale. He is known largely for his two books Traitte de l'aiman (1687) on magnetism and Traittez des barometres, thermometres, et notiometres, au hygrometres (1688) on barometers, thermometers and hygrometers.

D'Alencé's father, Martin, was a surgeon who influenced the creation of a position as a royal advisor in 1663. Joachim made a trip to England in 1668 where he obtained a telescope and became a friend of Henry Oldenburg. He later corresponded with Huygens and Leibniz. He is best remembered for his book describing thermometers and the system of graduating thermometers with two reference points - the freezing point of water and the melting point of butter. He suggested the use of a 3:1 mixture of water and nitric acid held in a bulb for the thermometer fluid. The two reference temperatures were to be divided into ten equal divisions and ten similar divisions above and below the upper and lower reference marks thus making up a 30 degree scale. In this 1688 book he claimed that the inventor of the thermometer was Cornelis Drebbel.
