= Cotta (surname) =

Cotta is a surname, and may refer to:

- Alix von Cotta (1842–1931), British educator and activist
- Bernhard von Cotta (1808–1879), German geologist
- Carloto Cotta (born 1984), Portuguese actor
- Elena Cotta (born 1931), Italian actress
- Heinrich Cotta (1763–1844), German forester
- Jacques Cotta (1908–1971), French politician
- Jens Cotta (born 1972), German politician
- Johann Friedrich Cotta (publisher) (1764–1832), German publisher, industrial pioneer and politician
- Johann Friedrich Cotta (theologian) (1701–1779), German Lutheran theologian
- John Cotta (1575–1650), English physician and author
- Michèle Cotta (born 1937), French political journalist
- Myron J. Cotta (born 1953), American Catholic prelate
- Pomponio Cotta (died 1579), Italian Roman Catholic prelate
- Sergio Cotta (1920–2007), Italian philosopher, jurist and academic
- Ursula Cotta (1450–1511), German benefactor

== See also ==
- Cotta Ramusino, surname
- Cott (surname)
- Cotte (surname)
- Cotti
- Cotto (surname)
