= Cotte (surname) =

Cotte is a surname, and may refer to:

- Bruno Cotte ((born 1945), French judge
- Jules-Robert de Cotte (1683–1767), French architect
- Leo Cotte (1946–2024), Puerto Rican politician
- Louis Cotte (1740–1815), French meteorologist
- Olivier Cotte (born 1963), French writer and film director
- Paul Cotte (1825–1901), French politician
- Robert de Cotte (1656–1735), French architect
- Roger Cotte (1921–1999), French musicologist and musician

== See also ==
- Cott (surname)
- Cotta (surname)
- Cotti
- Cotto (surname)
