= Timeline of meteorology =

Overview of the history of atmospheric sciences

The timeline of meteorology contains events of scientific and technological advancements in the area of atmospheric sciences. The most notable advancements in observational meteorology, weather forecasting, climatology, atmospheric chemistry, and atmospheric physics are listed chronologically. Some historical weather events are included that mark time periods where advancements were made, or even that sparked policy change.

== Antiquity ==
- 3000 BC – Meteorology in India can be traced back to around 3000 BC, with writings such as the Upanishads, containing discussions about the processes of cloud formation and rain and the seasonal cycles caused by the movement of the Earth around the Sun.
- 600 BC – Thales may qualify as the first Greek meteorologist. He reputedly issues the first seasonal crop forecast.
- 400 BC – There is some evidence that Democritus predicted changes in the weather, and that he used this ability to convince people that he could predict other future events.
- 400 BC – Hippocrates writes a treatise called Airs, Waters and Places, the earliest known work to include a discussion of weather. More generally, he wrote about common diseases that occur in particular locations, seasons, winds and air.
- 350 BC – The Greek philosopher Aristotle writes Meteorology, a work which represents the sum of knowledge of the time about Earth sciences, including weather and climate. It is the first known work that attempts to treat a broad range of meteorological topics. For the first time, precipitation and the clouds from which precipitation falls are called meteors, which originate from the Greek word meteoros, meaning 'high in the sky'. From that word comes the modern term meteorology, the study of clouds and weather.

Although the term meteorology is used today to describe a subdiscipline of the atmospheric sciences, Aristotle's work is more general. Meteorologica is based on intuition and simple observation, but not on what is now considered the scientific method. In his own words:

...all the affections we may call common to air and water, and the kinds and parts of the earth and the affections of its parts.

The magazine De Mundo (attributed to Pseudo-Aristotle) notes:
Cloud is a vaporous mass, concentrated and producing water. Rain is produced from the compression of a closely condensed cloud, varying according to the pressure exerted on the cloud; when the pressure is slight it scatters gentle drops; when it is great it produces a more violent fall, and we call this a shower, being heavier than ordinary rain, and forming continuous masses of water falling over earth. Snow is produced by the breaking up of condensed clouds, the cleavage taking place before the change into water; it is the process of cleavage which causes its resemblance to foam and its intense whiteness, while the cause of its coldness is the congelation of the moisture in it before it is dispersed or rarefied. When snow is violent and falls heavily we call it a blizzard. Hail is produced when snow becomes densified and acquires impetus for a swifter fall from its close mass; the weight becomes greater and the fall more violent in proportion to the size of the broken fragments of cloud. Such then are the phenomena which occur as the result of moist exhalation.

One of the most impressive achievements in Meteorology is his description of what is now known as the hydrologic cycle:

Now the sun, moving as it does, sets up processes of change and becoming and decay, and by its agency the finest and sweetest water is every day carried up and is dissolved into vapour and rises to the upper region, where it is condensed again by the cold and so returns to the earth.

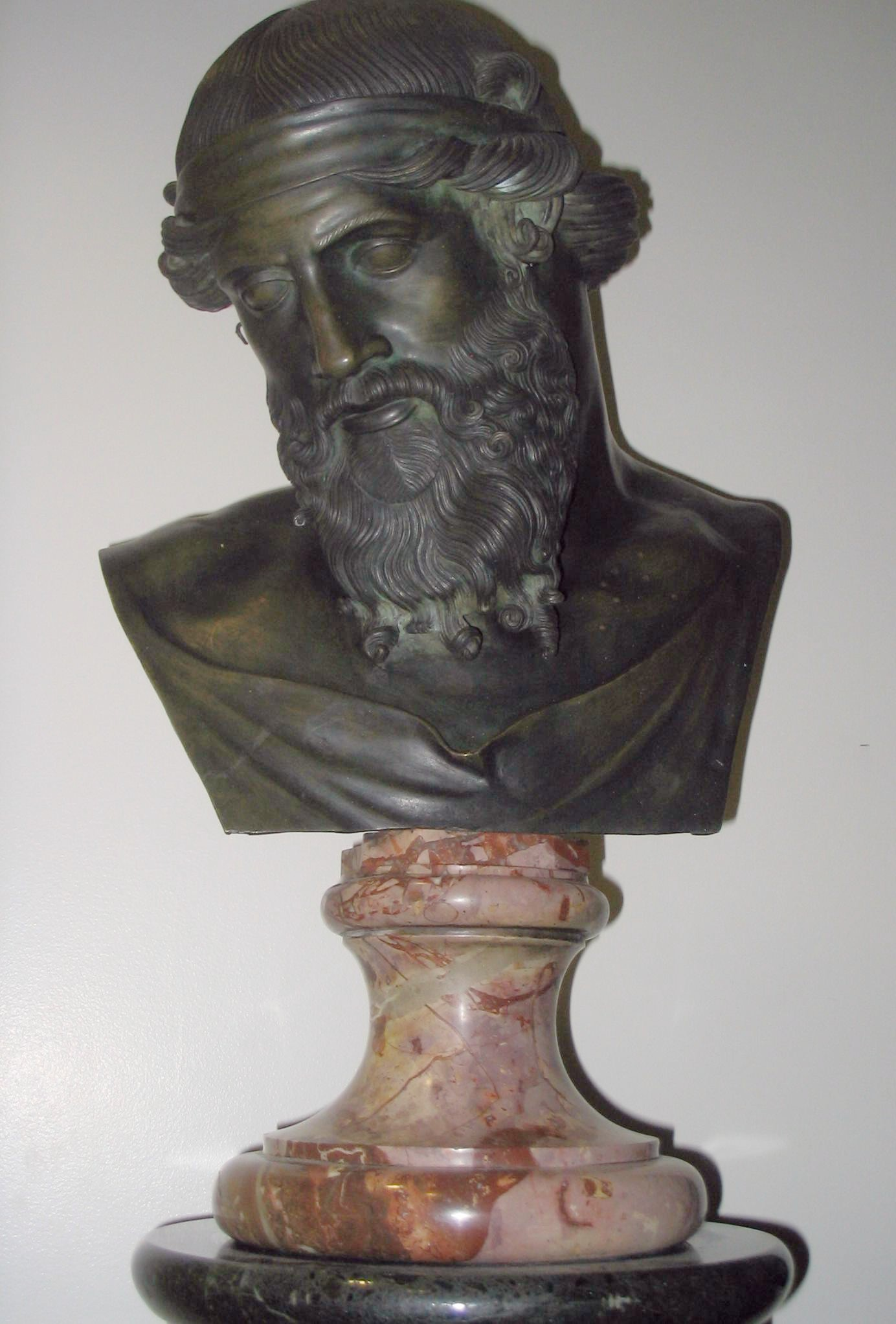
Aristotle

- Several years after Aristotle's book, his pupil Theophrastus puts together a book on weather forecasting called The Book of Signs. Various indicators such as solar and lunar halos formed by high clouds are presented as ways to forecast the weather. The combined works of Aristotle and Theophrastus have such authority they become the main influence in the study of clouds, weather and weather forecasting for nearly 2000 years.
- 250 BC – Archimedes studies the concepts of buoyancy and the hydrostatic principle. Positive buoyancy is necessary for the formation of convective clouds (cumulus, cumulus congestus and cumulonimbus).
- 25 AD – Pomponius Mela, a geographer for the Roman Empire, formalizes the climatic zone system.
- c. 80 AD – In his Lunheng (論衡; Critical Essays), the Han dynasty Chinese philosopher Wang Chong (27–97 AD) dispels the Chinese myth of rain coming from the heavens, and states that rain is evaporated from water on the earth into the air and forms clouds, stating that clouds condense into rain and also form dew, and says when the clothes of people in high mountains are moistened, this is because of the air-suspended rain water. However, Wang Chong supports his theory by quoting a similar one of Gongyang Gao's, the latter's commentary on the Spring and Autumn Annals, the Gongyang Zhuan, compiled in the 2nd century BC, showing that the Chinese conception of rain evaporating and rising to form clouds goes back much farther than Wang Chong. Wang Chong wrote:

As to this coming of rain from the mountains, some hold that the clouds carry the rain with them, dispersing as it is precipitated (and they are right). Clouds and rain are really the same thing. Water evaporating upwards becomes clouds, which condense into rain, or still further into dew.

== Middle Ages ==
- 500 AD – In around 500 AD, the Indian astronomer, mathematician, and astrologer: Varāhamihira published his work Brihat-Samhita's, which provides clear evidence that a deep knowledge of atmospheric processes existed in the Indian region.
- 7th century – The poet Kalidasa in his epic Meghaduta, mentions the date of onset of the south-west Monsoon over central India and traces the path of the monsoon clouds.
- 7th century – St. Isidore of Seville, in his work De Rerum Natura, writes about astronomy, cosmology and meteorology. In the chapter dedicated to Meteorology, he discusses the thunder, clouds, rainbows and wind.
- 9th century – Al-Kindi (Alkindus), an Arab naturalist, writes a treatise on meteorology entitled Risala fi l-Illa al-Failali l-Madd wa l-Fazr (Treatise on the Efficient Cause of the Flow and Ebb), in which he presents an argument on tides which "depends on the changes which take place in bodies owing to the rise and fall of temperature."
- 9th century – Al-Dinawari, a Kurdish naturalist, writes the Kitab al-Nabat (Book of Plants), in which he deals with the application of meteorology to agriculture during the Muslim Agricultural Revolution. He describes the meteorological character of the sky, the planets and constellations, the Sun and Moon, the lunar phases indicating seasons and rain, the anwa (heavenly bodies of rain), and atmospheric phenomena such as winds, thunder, lightning, snow, floods, valleys, rivers, lakes, wells and other sources of water.
- 10th century – Ibn Wahshiyya's Nabatean Agriculture discusses the weather forecasting of atmospheric changes and signs from the planetary astral alterations; signs of rain based on observation of the lunar phases, nature of thunder and lightning, direction of sunrise, behaviour of certain plants and animals, and weather forecasts based on the movement of winds; pollenized air and winds; and formation of winds and vapours.
- 1021 – Ibn al-Haytham (Alhazen) writes on the atmospheric refraction of light, the cause of morning and evening twilight. He endeavored by use of hyperbola and geometric optics to chart and formulate basic laws on atmospheric refraction. He provides the first correct definition of the twilight, discusses atmospheric refraction, shows that the twilight is due to atmospheric refraction and only begins when the Sun is 19 degrees below the horizon, and uses a complex geometric demonstration to measure the height of the Earth's atmosphere as 52,000 passuum (49 miles), which is very close to the modern measurement of 50 miles.
- 1020s – Ibn al-Haytham publishes his Risala fi l-Daw’ (Treatise on Light) as a supplement to his Book of Optics. He discusses the meteorology of the rainbow, the density of the atmosphere, and various celestial phenomena, including the eclipse, twilight and moonlight.
- 1027 – Avicenna publishes The Book of Healing, in which Part 2, Section 5, contains his essay on mineralogy and meteorology in six chapters: formation of mountains; the advantages of mountains in the formation of clouds; sources of water; origin of earthquakes; formation of minerals; and the diversity of earth's terrain. He also describes the structure of a meteor, and his theory on the formation of metals combined the alchemical sulfur-mercury theory of metals (although he was critical of alchemy) with the mineralogical theories of Aristotle and Theophrastus. His scientific methodology of field observation was also original in the Earth sciences.
- Late 11th century – Abu 'Abd Allah Muhammad ibn Ma'udh, who lived in Al-Andalus, wrote a work on optics later translated into Latin as Liber de crepisculis, which was mistakenly attributed to Alhazen. This was a short work containing an estimation of the angle of depression of the sun at the beginning of the morning twilight and at the end of the evening twilight, and an attempt to calculate on the basis of this and other data the height of the atmospheric moisture responsible for the refraction of the sun's rays. Through his experiments, he obtained the accurate value of 18°, which comes close to the modern value.
- 1088 – In his Dream Pool Essays (夢溪筆談), the Chinese scientist Shen Kuo wrote vivid descriptions of tornadoes, that rainbows were formed by the shadow of the sun in rain, occurring when the sun would shine upon it, and the curious common phenomena of the effect of lightning that, when striking a house, would merely scorch the walls a bit but completely melt to liquid all metal objects inside.
- 1121 – Al-Khazini, a Muslim scientist of Byzantine Greek descent, publishes The Book of the Balance of Wisdom, the first study on the hydrostatic balance.
- 13th century – St. Albert the Great is the first to propose that each drop of falling rain had the form of a small sphere, and that this form meant that the rainbow was produced by light interacting with each raindrop.
- 1267 – Roger Bacon was the first to calculate the angular size of the rainbow. He stated that the rainbow summit can not appear higher than 42 degrees above the horizon.
- 1337 – William Merle, rector of Driby, starts recording his weather diary, the oldest existing in print. The endeavour ended 1344.
- Late 13th century – Theodoric of Freiberg and Kamāl al-Dīn al-Fārisī give the first accurate explanations of the primary rainbow, simultaneously but independently. Theoderic also gives the explanation for the secondary rainbow.
- 1441 – King Sejong's son, Prince Munjong, invented the first standardized rain gauge. These were sent throughout the Joseon Dynasty of Korea as an official tool to assess land taxes based upon a farmer's potential harvest.

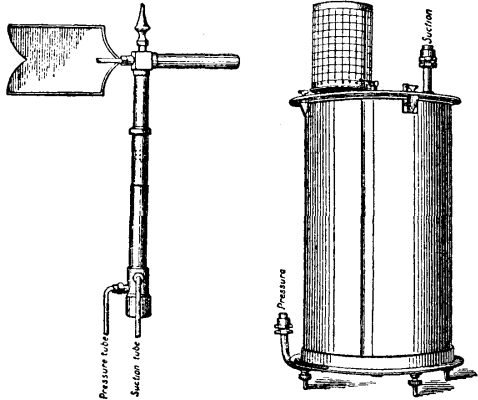
Anemometers

- 1450 – Leone Battista Alberti developed a swinging-plate anemometer, and is known as the first anemometer.

– Nicolas Cryfts, (Nicolas of Cusa), described the first hair hygrometer to measure humidity. The design was drawn by Leonardo da Vinci, referencing Cryfts design in da Vinci's Codex Atlanticus.

- 1483 − Yuriy Drohobych publishes Prognostic Estimation of the year 1483 in Rome, where he reflects upon weather forecasting and that climatic conditions depended on the latitude.
- 1488 – Johannes Lichtenberger publishes the first version of his Prognosticatio linking weather forecasting with astrology. The paradigm was only challenged centuries later.
- 1494 – During his second voyage Christopher Columbus experiences a tropical cyclone in the Atlantic Ocean, which leads to the first written European account of a hurricane.
- 1510 – Leonhard Reynmann, astronomer of Nuremberg, publishes ″Wetterbüchlein Von warer erkanntnus des wetters″, a collection of weather lore.
- 1547 − Antonio Mizauld publishes "Le miroueer du temps, autrement dit, éphémérides perpétuelles de l'air par lesquelles sont tous les jours donez vrais signes de touts changements de temps, seulement par choses qui à tous apparoissent au cien, en l'air, sur terre & en l'eau. Le tout par petits aphorismes, & breves sentences diligemment compris" in Paris, with detail on forecasting weather, comets and earthquakes.

== 17th century ==
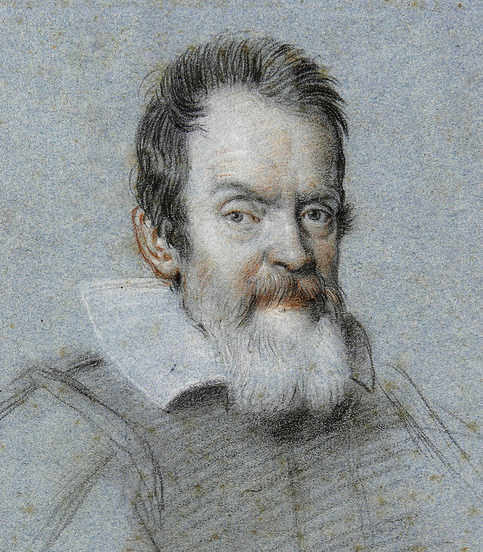
Galileo.

- 1607 – Galileo Galilei constructs a thermoscope. Not only did this device measure temperature, but it represented a paradigm shift. Up to this point, heat and cold were believed to be qualities of Aristotle's elements (fire, water, air, and earth). Note: There is some controversy about who actually built this first thermoscope. There is some evidence for this device being independently built at several different times. This is the era of the first recorded meteorological observations. As there was no standard measurement, they were of little use until the work of Daniel Gabriel Fahrenheit and Anders Celsius in the 18th century.

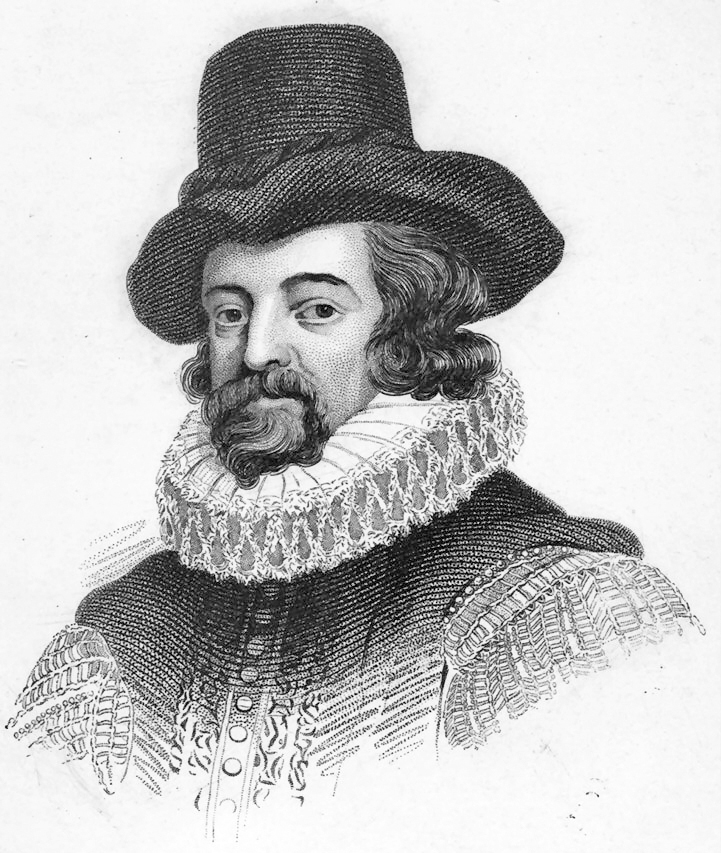
Sir Francis Bacon

- 1611 – Johannes Kepler writes the first scientific treatise on snow crystals: "Strena Seu de Nive Sexangula (A New Year's Gift of Hexagonal Snow)".
- 1620 – Francis Bacon (philosopher) analyzes the scientific method in his philosophical work; Novum Organum.
- 1643 – Evangelista Torricelli invents the mercury barometer.

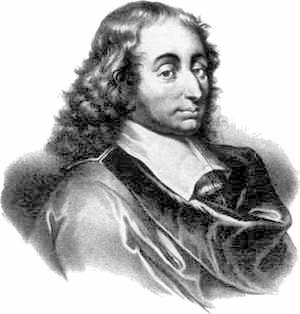
Blaise Pascal.

- 1648 – Blaise Pascal rediscovers that atmospheric pressure decreases with height, and deduces that there is a vacuum above the atmosphere.
- 1654 – Ferdinando II de Medici sponsors the first weather observing network, that consisted of meteorological stations in Florence, Cutigliano, Vallombrosa, Bologna, Parma, Milan, Innsbruck, Osnabrück, Paris and Warsaw. Collected data was centrally sent to Accademia del Cimento in Florence at regular time intervals.
- 1662 – Sir Christopher Wren invented the mechanical, self-emptying, tipping bucket rain gauge.
- 1667 – Robert Hooke builds another type of anemometer, called a pressure-plate anemometer.
- 1686 – Edmund Halley presents a systematic study of the trade winds and monsoons and identifies solar heating as the cause of atmospheric motions.

– Edmund Halley establishes the relationship between barometric pressure and height above sea level.

== 18th century ==
- 1716 – Edmund Halley suggests that aurorae are caused by "magnetic effluvia" moving along the Earth's magnetic field lines.

Global circulation as described by Hadley.

- 1724 – Gabriel Fahrenheit creates reliable scale for measuring temperature with a mercury-type thermometer.
- 1735 – The first ideal explanation of global circulation was the study of the Trade winds by George Hadley.
- 1738 – Daniel Bernoulli publishes Hydrodynamics, initiating the kinetic theory of gases. He gave a poorly detailed equation of state, but also the basic laws for the theory of gases.
- 1742 – Anders Celsius, a Swedish astronomer, proposed the Celsius temperature scale which led to the current Celsius scale.
- 1743 – Benjamin Franklin is prevented from seeing a lunar eclipse by a hurricane; he decides that cyclones move in a contrary manner to the winds at their periphery.
- 1761 – Joseph Black discovers that ice absorbs heat without changing its temperature when melting.
- 1772 – Black's student Daniel Rutherford discovers nitrogen, which he calls phlogisticated air, and together they explain the results in terms of the phlogiston theory.
- 1774 – Louis Cotte is put in charge of a "medico-meteorological" network of French veterinarians and country doctors to investigate the relationship between plague and weather. The project continued until 1794.

- Royal Society begins twice daily observations compiled by Samuel Horsley testing for the influence of winds and of the Moon on the barometer readings.

- 1777 – Antoine Lavoisier discovers oxygen and develops an explanation for combustion.
- 1780 – Charles Theodor charters the first international network of meteorological observers known as "Societas Meteorologica Palatina". The project collapses in 1795.
- 1780 – James Six invents the Six's thermometer, a thermometer that records minimum and maximum temperatures. See (Six's thermometer)
- 1783 – In Lavoisier's article "Reflexions sur le phlogistique", he deprecates the phlogiston theory and proposes a caloric theory of heat.

– First hair hygrometer demonstrated. The inventor was Horace-Bénédict de Saussure.

== 19th century ==
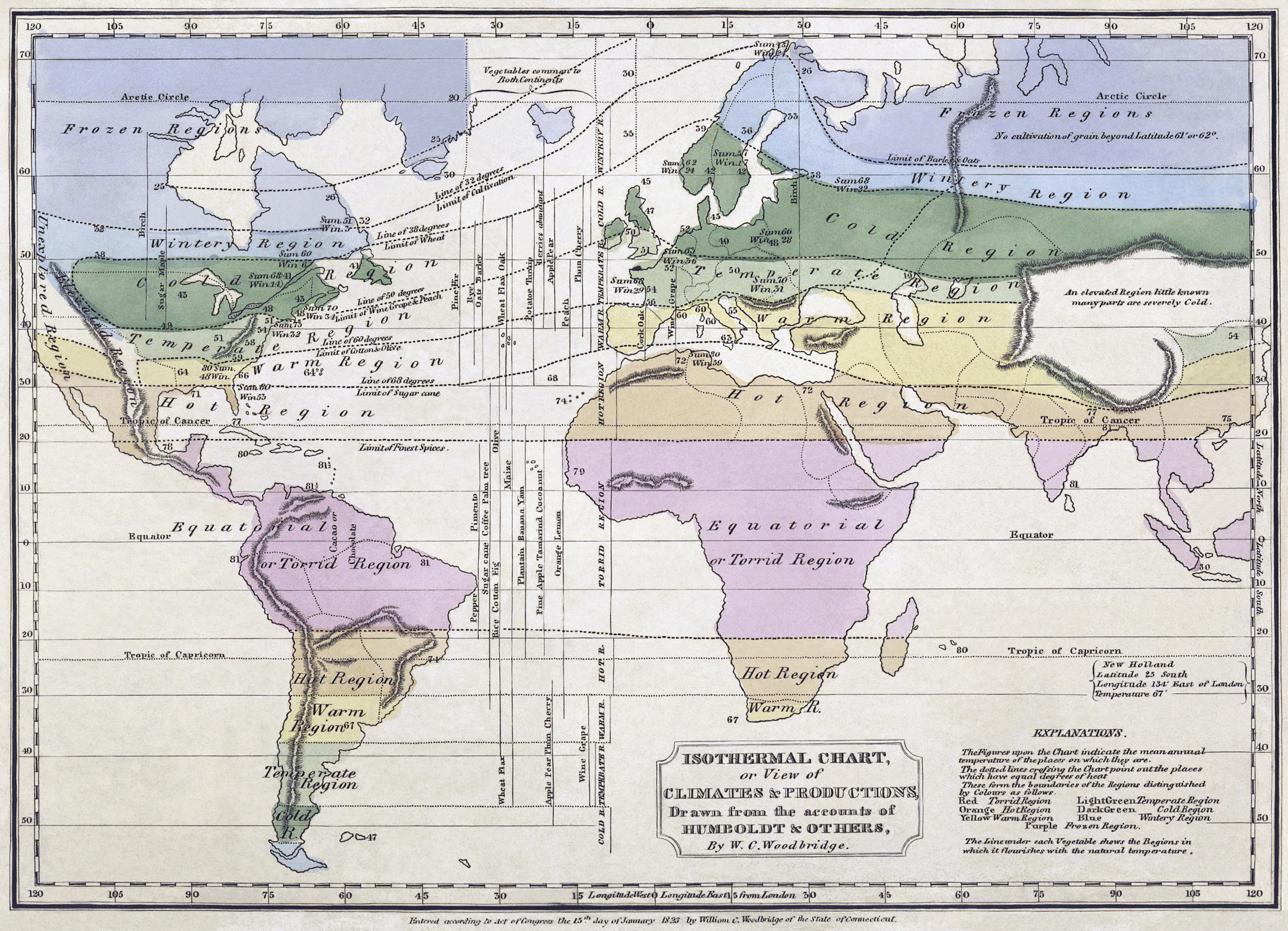
Isothermal chart of the world created 1823 by William Channing Woodbridge using the work of Alexander von Humboldt.

- 1800 – The Voltaic pile was the first modern electric battery, invented by Alessandro Volta, which led to later inventions like the telegraph.
- 1802–1803 – Luke Howard writes On the Modification of Clouds in which he assigns cloud types Latin names. Howard's system establishes three physical categories or forms based on appearance and process of formation: cirriform (mainly detached and wispy), cumuliform or convective (mostly detached and heaped, rolled, or rippled), and non-convective stratiform (mainly continuous layers in sheets). These are cross-classified into lower and upper levels or étages. Cumuliform clouds forming in the lower level are given the genus name cumulus from the Latin word for heap, while low stratiform clouds are given the genus name stratus from the Latin word for a flattened or spread out sheet. Cirriform clouds are identified as always upper level and given the genus name cirrus from the Latin for hair. From this genus name, the prefix cirro- is derived and attached to the names of upper level cumulus and stratus, yielding the names cirrocumulus, and cirrostratus. In addition to these individual cloud types; Howard adds two names to designate cloud systems consisting of more than one form joined together or located in very close proximity. Cumulostratus describes large cumulus clouds blended with stratiform layers in the lower or upper levels. The term nimbus, taken from the Latin word for rain cloud, is given to complex systems of cirriform, cumuliform, and stratiform clouds with sufficient vertical development to produce significant precipitation, and it comes to be identified as a distinct nimbiform physical category.

Classification of major types: 1803	Stratiform	Cirriform	Cumulostratiform	Cumuliform	Nimbiform
Upper-level	Cirrostratus	Cirrus		Cirrocumulus	
Lower-level	Stratus			Cumulus	
Multi-level/vertical			Cumulostratus		Nimbus

- 1804 – Sir John Leslie observes that a matte black surface radiates heat more effectively than a polished surface, suggesting the importance of black-body radiation.
- 1806 – Francis Beaufort introduces his system for classifying wind speeds.
- 1808 – John Dalton defends caloric theory in A New System of Chemistry and describes how it combines with matter, especially gases; he proposes that the heat capacity of gases varies inversely with atomic weight.
- 1810 – Sir John Leslie freezes water to ice artificially.
- 1817 – Alexander von Humboldt publishes a global map of average temperature, the first global climate analysis.
- 1819 – Pierre Louis Dulong and Alexis Thérèse Petit give the Dulong-Petit law for the specific heat capacity of a crystal.
- 1820 – Heinrich Wilhelm Brandes publishes the first synoptic weather maps.

– John Herapath develops some ideas in the kinetic theory of gases but mistakenly associates temperature with molecular momentum rather than kinetic energy; his work receives little attention other than from Joule.

- 1822 – Joseph Fourier formally introduces the use of dimensions for physical quantities in his Theorie Analytique de la Chaleur.
- 1824 – Sadi Carnot analyzes the efficiency of steam engines using caloric theory; he develops the notion of a reversible process and, in postulating that no such thing exists in nature, lays the foundation for the second law of thermodynamics.
- 1827 – Robert Brown discovers the Brownian motion of pollen and dye particles in water.
- 1832 – An electromagnetic telegraph was created by Baron Schilling.
- 1834 – Émile Clapeyron popularises Carnot's work through a graphical and analytic formulation.
- 1835 – Gaspard-Gustave Coriolis publishes theoretical discussions of machines with revolving parts and their efficiency, for example the efficiency of waterwheels. At the end of the 19th century, meteorologists recognized that the way the Earth's rotation is taken into account in meteorology is analogous to what Coriolis discussed: an example of Coriolis Effect.
- 1836 – An American scientist, Dr. David Alter, invented the first known American electric telegraph in Elderton, Pennsylvania, one year before the much more popular Morse telegraph was invented.
- 1837 – Samuel Morse independently developed an electrical telegraph, an alternative design that was capable of transmitting over long distances using poor quality wire. His assistant, Alfred Vail, developed the Morse code signaling alphabet with Morse. The first electric telegram using this device was sent by Morse on May 24, 1844, from the U.S. Capitol in Washington, D.C. to the B&O Railroad "outer depot" in Baltimore and sent the message:

What hath God wrought

- 1839 – The first commercial electrical telegraph was constructed by Sir William Fothergill Cooke and entered use on the Great Western Railway. Cooke and Wheatstone patented it in May 1837 as an alarm system.
- 1840 – Elias Loomis becomes the first person known to attempt to devise a theory on frontal zones. The idea of fronts do not catch on until expanded upon by the Norwegians in the years following World War I.

– German meteorologist Ludwig Kaemtz adds stratocumulus to Howard's canon as a mostly detached low-étage genus of limited convection. It is defined as having cumuliform and stratiform characteristics integrated into a single layer (in contrast to cumulostratus which is deemed to be composite in nature and can be structured into more than one layer). This eventually leads to the formal recognition of a stratocumuliform physical category that includes rolled and rippled clouds classified separately from the more freely convective heaped cumuliform clouds.

- 1843 – John James Waterston fully expounds the kinetic theory of gases, but is ridiculed and ignored.

– James Prescott Joule experimentally finds the mechanical equivalent of heat.

- 1844 – Lucien Vidi invented the aneroid, from Greek meaning without liquid, barometer.
- 1845 – Francis Ronalds invented the first successful camera for continuous recording of the variations in meteorological parameters over time
- 1845 – Francis Ronalds invented and named the storm clock, used to monitor rapid changes in meteorological parameters during extreme events
- 1846 – Cup anemometer invented by Dr. John Thomas Romney Robinson.
- 1847 – Francis Ronalds and William Radcliffe Birt described a stable kite to make observations at altitude using self-recording instruments
- 1847 – Hermann von Helmholtz publishes a definitive statement of the conservation of energy, the first law of thermodynamics.

– The Manchester Examiner newspaper organises the first weather reports collected by electrical means.

- 1848 – William Thomson extends the concept of absolute zero from gases to all substances.
- 1849 – Smithsonian Institution begins to establish an observation network across the United States, with 150 observers via telegraph, under the leadership of Joseph Henry.

– William John Macquorn Rankine calculates the correct relationship between saturated vapour pressure and temperature using his hypothesis of molecular vortices.

- 1850 – Rankine uses his vortex theory to establish accurate relationships between the temperature, pressure, and density of gases, and expressions for the latent heat of evaporation of a liquid; he accurately predicts the surprising fact that the apparent specific heat of saturated steam will be negative.

– Rudolf Clausius gives the first clear joint statement of the first and second law of thermodynamics, abandoning the caloric theory, but preserving Carnot's principle.

- 1852 – Joule and Thomson demonstrate that a rapidly expanding gas cools, later named the Joule-Thomson effect.
- 1853 – The first International Meteorological Conference was held in Brussels at the initiative of Matthew Fontaine Maury, U.S. Navy, recommending standard observing times, methods of observation and logging format for weather reports from ships at sea.
- 1854 – The French astronomer Leverrier showed that a storm in the Black Sea could be followed across Europe and would have been predictable if the telegraph had been used. A service of storm forecasts was established a year later by the Paris Observatory.

– Rankine introduces his thermodynamic function, later identified as entropy.

- Mid 1850s – Emilien Renou, director of the Parc Saint-Maur and Montsouris observatories, begins work on an elaboration of Howard's classifications that would lead to the introduction during the 1870s of a newly defined middle étage . Clouds in this altitude range are given the prefix alto- derived from the Latin word altum pertaining to height above the low-level clouds. This resultes in the genus name altocumulus for mid-level cumuliform and stratocumuliform types and altostratus for stratiform types in the same altitude range.
- 1856 – William Ferrel publishes his essay on the winds and the currents of the oceans.
- 1859 – James Clerk Maxwell discovers the distribution law of molecular velocities.
- 1860 – Robert FitzRoy uses the new telegraph system to gather daily observations from across England and produces the first synoptic charts. He also coined the term "weather forecast" and his were the first ever daily weather forecasts to be published in this year.

– After establishment in 1849, 500 U.S. telegraph stations are now making weather observations and submitting them back to the Smithsonian Institution. The observations are later interrupted by the American Civil War.

- 1865 – Josef Loschmidt applies Maxwell's theory to estimate the number-density of molecules in gases, given observed gas viscosities.

– Manila Observatory founded in the Philippines.

- 1869 – Joseph Lockyer starts the scientific journal Nature.
- 1869 – The New York Meteorological Observatory opens, and begins to record wind, precipitation and temperature data.
- 1870 – The US Weather Bureau is founded. Data recorded in several Midwestern cities such as Chicago begins.
- 1870 – Benito Viñes becomes the head of the Meteorological Observatory at Belen in Havana, Cuba. He develops the first observing network in Cuba and creates some of the first hurricane-related forecasts.
- 1872 – The "Oficina Meteorológica Argentina" (today "Argentinean National Weather Service") is founded.
- 1872 – Ludwig Boltzmann states the Boltzmann equation for the temporal development of distribution functions in phase space, and publishes his H-theorem.
- 1873 – International Meteorological Organization formed in Vienna.

– United States Army Signal Corp, forerunner of the National Weather Service, issues its first hurricane warning.

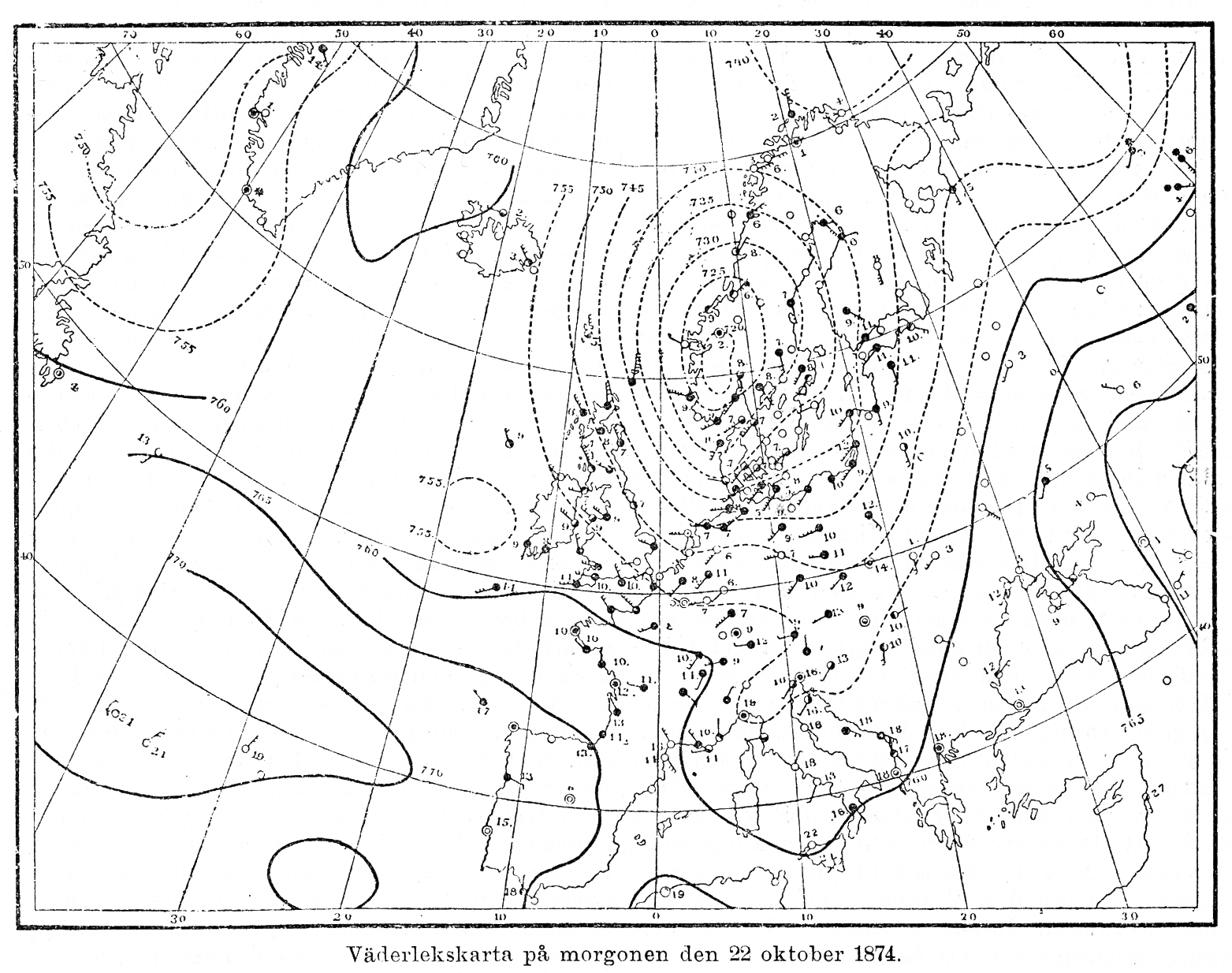
Synoptic chart from 1874.

- 1875 – The India Meteorological Department is established, after a tropical cyclone struck Calcutta in 1864 and monsoon failures during 1866 and 1871.
- 1876 – Josiah Willard Gibbs publishes the first of two papers (the second appears in 1878) which discuss phase equilibria, statistical ensembles, the free energy as the driving force behind chemical reactions, and chemical thermodynamics in general.
- 1880 – Philip Weilbach, secretary and librarian at the Art Academy in Copenhagen proposes and has accepted by the permanent committee of the International Meteorological Organization (IMO), a forerunner of the present-day World Meteorological Organization (WMO), the designation of a new free-convective vertical or multi-étage genus type, cumulonimbus (heaped rain cloud). It would be distinct from cumulus and nimbus and identifiable by its often very complex structure (frequently including a cirriform top and what are now recognized as multiple accessory clouds), and its ability to produce thunder. With this addition, a canon of ten tropospheric cloud genera is established that comes to be officially and universally accepted. Howard's cumulostratus is not included as a distinct type, having effectively been reclassified into its component cumuliform and stratiform genus types already included in the new canon.
- 1881 – Finnish Meteorological Central Office was formed from part of Magnetic Observatory of Helsinki University.
- 1890 – US Weather Bureau is created as a civilian operation under the U.S. Department of Agriculture.

– Otto Jesse reveals the discovery and identification of the first clouds known to form above the troposphere. He proposes the name noctilucent which is Latin for night shining. Because of the extremely high altitudes of these clouds in what is now known to be the mesosphere, they can become illuminated by the sun's rays when the sky is nearly dark after sunset and before sunrise.

- 1892 – William Henry Dines invented another kind of anemometer, called the pressure-tube (Dines) anemometer. His device measured the difference in pressure arising from wind blowing in a tube versus that blowing across the tube.

– The first mention of the term "El Niño" to refer to climate occurs when Captain Camilo Carrilo told the Geographical society congress in Lima that Peruvian sailors named the warm northerly current "El Niño" because it was most noticeable around Christmas.

- 1893 – Henrik Mohn reveals a discovery of nacreous clouds in what is now considered the stratosphere.
- 1896 – IMO publishes the first International cloud atlas.

– Svante Arrhenius proposes carbon dioxide as a key factor to explain the ice ages.
– H.H. Clayton proposes formalizing the division of clouds by their physical structures into cirriform, stratiform, "flocciform" (stratocumuliform) and cumuliform. With the later addition of cumulonimbiform, the idea eventually finds favor as an aid in the analysis of satellite cloud images.

- 1898 – US Weather Bureau established a hurricane warning network at Kingston, Jamaica.

== 20th century ==
- 1902 – Richard Assmann and Léon Teisserenc de Bort, two European scientists, independently discovered the stratosphere.

- The Marconi Company issues the first routine weather forecast by means of radio to ships on sea. Weather reports from ships started 1905.

- 1903 – Max Margules publishes „Über die Energie der Stürme", an essay on the atmosphere as a three-dimensional thermodynamical machine.
- 1904 – Vilhelm Bjerknes presents the vision that forecasting the weather is feasible based on mathematical methods.
- 1905 – Australian Bureau of Meteorology established by a Meteorology Act to unify existing state meteorological services.
- 1919 – Norwegian cyclone model introduced for the first time in meteorological literature. Marks a revolution in the way the atmosphere is conceived and immediately starts leading to improved forecasts.

- Sakuhei Fujiwhara is the first to note that hurricanes move with the larger scale flow, and later publishes a paper on the Fujiwhara effect in 1921.

- 1920 – Milutin Milanković proposes that long term climatic cycles may be due to changes in the eccentricity of the Earth's orbit and changes in the Earth's obliquity.
- 1922 – Lewis Fry Richardson organises the first numerical weather prediction experiment.
- 1923 – The oscillation effects of ENSO were first erroneously described by Sir Gilbert Thomas Walker from whom the Walker circulation takes its name; now an important aspect of the Pacific ENSO phenomenon.
- 1924 – Gilbert Walker first coined the term "Southern Oscillation".
- 1930, January 30 – Pavel Molchanov invents and launches the first radiosonde. Named "271120", it was released 13:44 Moscow Time in Pavlovsk, USSR from the Main Geophysical Observatory, reached a height of 7.8 kilometers measuring temperature there (−40.7 °C) and sent the first aerological message to the Leningrad Weather Bureau and Moscow Central Forecast Institute.
- 1932 – A further modification of Luke Howard's cloud classification system comes when an IMC commission for the study of clouds puts forward a refined and more restricted definition of the genus nimbus which is effectively reclassified as a stratiform cloud type. It is renamed nimbostratus (flattened or spread out rain cloud) and published with the new name in the 1932 edition of the International Atlas of Clouds and of States of the Sky. This leaves cumulonimbus as the only nimbiform type as indicated by its root-name.
- 1933 – Victor Schauberger publishes his theories on the carbon cycle and its relationship to the weather in Our Senseless Toil
- 1935 – IMO decides on the 30 years normal period (1900–1930) to describe the climate.
- 1937 – The U.S. Army Air Forces Weather Service was established (redesignated in 1946 as AWS-Air Weather Service).
- 1938 – Guy Stewart Callendar first to propose global warming from carbon dioxide emissions.
- 1939 – Rossby waves were first identified in the atmosphere by Carl-Gustaf Arvid Rossby who explained their motion. Rossby waves are a subset of inertial waves.
- 1941 – Pulsed radar network is implemented in England during World War II. Generally during the war, operators started noticing echoes from weather elements such as rain and snow.
- 1943 – 10 years after flying into the Washington Hoover Airport on mainly instruments during the August 1933 Chesapeake-Potomac hurricane, J. B. Duckworth flies his airplane into a Gulf hurricane off the coast of Texas, proving to the military and meteorological community the utility of weather reconnaissance.
- 1944 – The Great Atlantic Hurricane is caught on radar near the Mid-Atlantic coast, the first such picture noted from the United States.
- 1947 – The Soviet Union launched its first Long Range Ballistic Rocket October 18, based on the German rocket A4 (V-2). The photographs demonstrated the immense potential of observing weather from space.
- 1948 – First correct tornado prediction by Robert C. Miller and E. J. Fawbush for tornado in Oklahoma.

– Erik Palmén publishes his findings that hurricanes require surface water temperatures of at least 26°C (80°F) in order to form.

- 1950 – First successful numerical weather prediction experiment. Princeton University, group of Jule Gregory Charney on ENIAC.

– Hurricanes begin to be named alphabetically with the radio alphabet.
– WMO World Meteorological Organization replaces IMO under the auspice of the United Nations.

- 1953 – National Hurricane Center (NOAA) creates a system for naming hurricanes using alphabetical lists of women's names.
- 1954 – First routine real-time numerical weather forecasting. The Royal Swedish Air Force Weather Service.

– A United States Navy rocket captures a picture of an inland tropical depression near the Texas/Mexico border, which leads to a surprise flood event in New Mexico. This convinces the government to set up a weather satellite program.

- 1955 – Norman Phillips at the Institute for Advanced Study in Princeton, New Jersey, runs first Atmospheric General Circulation Model.

– NSSP National Severe Storms Project and NHRP National Hurricane Research Projects established. The Miami office of the United States Weather Bureau is designated the main hurricane warning center for the Atlantic Basin.

- 1957–1958 – International Geophysical Year coordinated research efforts in eleven sciences, focused on polar areas during the solar maximum.

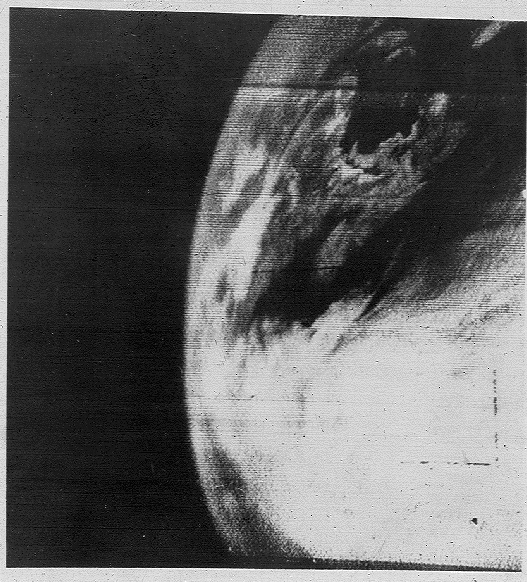
The first television image of Earth from space from the TIROS-1 weather satellite.

- 1959 – The first weather satellite, Vanguard 2, was launched on February 17. It was designed to measure cloud cover, but a poor axis of rotation kept it from collecting a notable amount of useful data.
- 1960 – The first successful weather satellite, TIROS-1 (Television Infrared Observation Satellite), is launched on April 1 from Cape Canaveral, Florida by the National Aeronautics and Space Administration (NASA) with the participation of The US Army Signal Research and Development Lab, RCA, the US Weather Bureau, and the US Naval Photographic Center. During its 78-day mission, it relays thousands of pictures showing the structure of large-scale cloud regimes, and proves that satellites can provide useful surveillance of global weather conditions from space. TIROS paves the way for the Nimbus program, whose technology and findings are the heritage of most of the Earth-observing satellites NASA and NOAA have launched since then.
- 1961 – Edward Lorenz accidentally discovers Chaos theory when working on numerical weather prediction.
- 1962 – Keith Browning and Frank Ludlam publish first detailed study of a supercell storm (over Wokingham, UK). Project STORMFURY begins its 10-year project of seeding hurricanes with silver iodide, attempting to weaken the cyclones.
- 1968 – A hurricane database for Atlantic hurricanes is created for NASA by Charlie Newmann and John Hope, named HURDAT.
- 1969 – Saffir–Simpson Hurricane Scale created, used to describe hurricane strength on a category range of 1 to 5. Popularized during Hurricane Gloria of 1985 by media.

– Jacob Bjerknes described ENSO by suggesting that an anomalously warm spot in the eastern Pacific can weaken the east-west temperature difference, causing weakening in the Walker circulation and trade wind flows, which push warm water to the west.

- 1970s Weather radars are becoming more standardized and organized into networks. The number of scanned angles was increased to get a three-dimensional view of the precipitation, which allowed studies of thunderstorms. Experiments with the Doppler effect begin.
- 1970 – NOAA National Oceanic and Atmospheric Administration established. Weather Bureau is renamed the National Weather Service.
- 1971 – Ted Fujita introduces the Fujita scale for rating tornadoes.
- 1974 – AMeDAS network, developed by Japan Meteorological Agency used for gathering regional weather data and verifying forecast performance, begun operation on November 1, the system consists of about 1,300 stations with automatic observation equipment. These stations, of which more than 1,100 are unmanned, are located at an average interval of 17 km throughout Japan.
- 1975 – The first Geostationary Operational Environmental Satellite, GOES, was launched into orbit. Their role and design is to aid in hurricane tracking. Also this year, Vern Dvorak develops a scheme to estimate tropical cyclone intensity from satellite imagery.

– The first use of a General Circulation Model to study the effects of carbon dioxide doubling. Syukuro Manabe and Richard Wetherald at Princeton University.

- 1976 – The United Kingdom Department of Industry publishes a modification of the international cloud classification system adapted for satellite cloud observations. It is co-sponsored by NASA and showes a division of clouds into stratiform, cirriform, stratocumuliform, cumuliform, and cumulonimbiform. The last of these constitutes a change in name of the earlier nimbiform type, although this earlier name and original meaning pertaining to all rain clouds can still be found in some classifications.

Major types: current	Stratiform	Cirriform	Stratocumuliform	Cumuliform	Cumulonimbiform
Extreme level	PMC: Noctilucent veils	Noctilucent billows or whirls	Noctilucent bands		
Very high level	Nitric acid and water PSC	Cirriform nacreous PSC	Lenticular nacreous PSC		
High-level	Cirrostratus	Cirrus	Cirrocumulus		
Mid-level	Altostratus		Altocumulus		
Low-level	Stratus		Stratocumulus	Cumulus humilis or fractus	
Multi-level or moderate vertical	Nimbostratus			Cumulus mediocris	
Towering vertical				Cumulus congestus	Cumulonimbus

Major types shown here include the ten tropospheric genera that are detectable (but not always identifiable) by satellite, and several additional major types above the troposphere that were not included with the original modification. The cumulus genus includes four species that indicate vertical size and structure.

- 1980s onwards, networks of weather radars are further expanded in the developed world. Doppler weather radar is becoming gradually more common, adds velocity information.
- 1982 – The first Synoptic Flow experiment is flown around Hurricane Debby to help define the large scale atmospheric winds that steer the storm.
- 1988 – WSR-88D type weather radar implemented in the United States. Weather surveillance radar that uses several modes to detect severe weather conditions.
- 1992 – Computers first used in the United States to draw surface analyses.
- 1997 – The Pacific Decadal Oscillation was discovered by a team studying salmon production patterns at the University of Washington.
- 1998 – Improving technology and software finally allows for the digital underlying of satellite imagery, radar imagery, model data, and surface observations improving the quality of United States Surface Analyses.

– CAMEX3, a NASA experiment run in conjunction with NOAA's Hurricane Field Program collects detailed data sets on Hurricanes Bonnie, Danielle, and Georges.

- 1999 – Hurricane Floyd induces fright factor in some coastal States and causes a massive evacuation from coastal zones from northern Florida to the Carolinas. It comes ashore in North Carolina and results in nearly 80 dead and $4.5 billion in damages mostly due to extensive flooding.

== 21st century ==
- 2001 – National Weather Service begins to produce a Unified Surface Analysis, ending duplication of effort at the Tropical Prediction Center, Ocean Prediction Center, Hydrometeorological Prediction Center, as well as the National Weather Service offices in Anchorage, AK and Honolulu, HI.
- 2003 – NOAA hurricane experts issue first experimental Eastern Pacific Hurricane Outlook.
- 2004 – A record number of hurricanes strike Florida in one year, Charley, Frances, Ivan, and Jeanne.
- 2005 – A record 27 named storms occur in the Atlantic. National Hurricane Center runs out of names from its standard list and uses Greek alphabet for the first time.
- 2006 – Weather radar improved by adding common precipitation to it such as freezing rain, rain and snow mixed, and snow for the first time.
- 2007 – The Fujita scale is replaced with the Enhanced Fujita scale for National Weather Service tornado assessments.
- 2010s – Weather radar dramatically advances with more detailed options.
- 2018 — Multiple European government meteorological agencies along with the European Severe Storms Laboratory draft the International Fujita scale.
- 2023 — Elizabeth Leitman becomes the first woman to issue a convective watch from the Storm Prediction Center.

== See also ==
- Meteorology
- Glossary of meteorology
- Outline of meteorology
- Atlantic hurricane season
- North Indian Ocean tropical cyclone
- Pacific hurricane
- Pacific typhoon climatology
- Timeline of temperature and pressure measurement technology
