= Angelo Bellani =

Angelo Bellani (31 October 1776 – 28 August 1852) was an Italian Catholic priest and physicist. He is best known for his work in the measurement of temperature and humidity using instruments and his inventions included a temperature recording thermograph. He started a company for producing standardized thermometers.

== Biography ==
Bellani was born in Monza where he trained to become a priest. He also took an interest in physics and was involved in debates with Alessandro Volta on the origin of hail. He also argued against the ideas of Paolo Beltrami to prevent hailstones with cannons. Bellani noted that thermometers had problems with the stability of their zero point (0°C as marked by placing in ice) due to defects in their construction and the quality of glass used. He also used a U-shaped glass that inspired James Six to produce the minimum-maximum thermometer.

In 1820 Bellani invented a device for measuring evaporation that was called an atmometer. Modified versions of the Bellani plate evaporimeter are still in use.

He invented a hygrometer using a fish bladder in 1836. Another innovation was his pyranometer to measure solar radiation which was a closed glass capsule in which alcohol was evaporated by solar radiation and the condensate being measured. He also wrote on the trails of meteors suggesting that they might remain at high altitude due to the lack of movement of the upper atmosphere.
