= MMTS =

MMTS may refer to:

- Moscow Monorail Transport System
- Hyderabad Multi-Modal Transport System
- MMTS (meteorology), Maximum Minimum Temperature System
- MMTS Kwidzyn, a Polish handball club
- S-Methyl methanethiosulfonate
