= Cott (disambiguation) =

Cott may refer to:

- Cott, an Anglo-Saxon homestead in Britain, used as a placename ending. See List of generic forms in place names in Ireland and the United Kingdom; see Cottage.
- Cott Corporation, a beverage and foodservice company based in Canada.
- Cott Inn, in Devon, England
- Cott (surname)

== See also ==
- Van Cott
