= Jean-Henri Jaeger =

French surgeon and academic (1944–2022)

- Born: 1944; Thionville, Gau Westmark, German-occupied France, Germany
- Died: 8 February 2022 (aged 78); Salernes, France
- Education: University of Strasbourg I
- Occupations: Surgeon; Professor

Jean-Henri Jaeger (1944 – 8 February 2022) was a French surgeon and academic. He was well known for developing a surgical technique to repair the anterior cruciate ligament (ACL), using the fascia lata as a form of transplant.

== Biography ==
Jaeger was born in Thionville to an engineer father who worked for the SNCF. He became devoted to working in surgery after a near-death experience from a kick to the stomach during a football match at the age of six. He studied at the University of Strasbourg I, where he met his lifelong friend Arsène Wenger.

In 1978, while working for a clinic, he was called to be team surgeon for RC Strasbourg Alsace. He notably operated on Marius Trésor in 1981, who then competed in the 1982 FIFA World Cup. Other players he operated on included Christophe Royer, Raymond Kopa, Zinedine Zidane, Dragan Stojković, Bixente Lizarazu, and others. He was also a professor at the University of Strasbourg I.

Jaeger died in Salernes on 8 February 2022, at the age of 78.

== Works ==
- Ligamentoplastie du LCA Mac Intosh FL versus KJ et DIDT, réparation cartilagineuse (2002)
- Chirurgie du ligament croisé antérieur du genou la lésion du LCA (2017)
