= Cotta Ramusino =

Cotta Ramusino (or Cotta-Ramusino) is an Italian surname from Lombardy. Notable people with the surname include:

- Alberto Cotta Ramusino (born 1995), known as Tananai, Italian singer-songwriter and record producer
- Gabriella Cotta Ramusino (born 1942), Italian sprint canoer
- Paolo Cotta-Ramusino (born 1948), Italian physicist

== See also ==
- Cotta (surname)
