= Kyffhäuserkreis II =

Electoral constituency in Thuringia, Germany

Kyffhäuserkreis II is an electoral constituency (German: Wahlkreis) represented in the Landtag of Thuringia. It elects one member via first-past-the-post voting. Under the current constituency numbering system, it is designated as constituency 11. It covers the eastern part of Kyffhäuserkreis.

Kyffhäuserkreis II was created for the 1994 state election. Since 2019, it has been represented by Jens Cotta of Alternative for Germany (AfD).

== Geography ==
As of the 2019 state election, Kyffhäuserkreis II covers the eastern part of Kyffhäuserkreis, specifically the municipalities of An der Schmücke, Artern, Bad Frankenhausen/Kyffhäuser, Borxleben, Etzleben, Gehofen, Kalbsrieth, Kyffhäuserland, Mönchpfiffel-Nikolausrieth, Oberheldrungen, Reinsdorf, and Roßleben-Wiehe.

== Members ==
The constituency was held by the Christian Democratic Union (CDU) from its creation in 1994 until 2019, during which time it was represented by Detlev Braasch (1994–2004) and Gudrun Holbe (2004–2019). It was won by Alternative for Germany in 2019, and is represented by Jens Cotta.

Election	Member	Party	%
1994	Detlev Braasch	CDU	43.2
1999	Detlev Braasch	CDU	47.8
2004	Gudrun Holbe	CDU	46.9
2009	Gudrun Holbe	CDU	36.9
2014	Gudrun Holbe	CDU	36.1
2019	Jens Cotta	AfD	29.2
2024	Jens Cotta	AfD	46.5

== Election results ==
=== 2024 election ===
State election (2024): Kyffhäuserkreis II
Notes:	Blue background denotes the winner of the electorate vote. Pink background denotes a candidate elected from their party list. Yellow background denotes an electorate win by a list member, or other incumbent. A ✓ or ✗ denotes status of any incumbent, win or lose respectively.						
Party	Candidate	Votes	%	±%	Party votes	%	±%
AfD	✓ Jens Cotta	9,650	46.5	▲17.3	8,329	39.7	▲12.0
CDU	Johannes Selle	5,383	26.0	▲3.4	4,156	19.8	▲0.9
BSW					3,522	16.8	
Left	Christoph Hall	3,450	16.6	▼10.7	2,809	13.4	▼19.4
SPD	Sascha Schwerdt	1,628	7.9	▼4.0	1,020	4.9	▼4.4
APT					243	1.2	▼0.1
FDP	Fred Degenhardt	374	1.8	▼1.9	193	0.9	▼3.0
Greens	Janine Ritschel	248	1.2	▼2.0	256	1.2	▼1.2
Familie					121	0.6	
FW					110	0.5	
BD					55	0.3	
Values					50	0.2	
Pirates					46	0.2	▼0.1
ÖDP					23	0.1	▼0.3
MLPD					23	0.1	▼0.1
Informal votes		434			211		
Total valid votes		20,733			20,956		
Turnout		21,167	69.9	▲9.1			
AfD hold	Majority	4,267	20.5	▲18.6			

=== 2019 election ===
State election (2019): Kyffhäuserkreis II
Notes:	Blue background denotes the winner of the electorate vote. Pink background denotes a candidate elected from their party list. Yellow background denotes an electorate win by a list member, or other incumbent. A ✓ or ✗ denotes status of any incumbent, win or lose respectively.						
Party	Candidate	Votes	%	±%	Party votes	%	±%
AfD	Jens Cotta	5,562	29.2		5,287	27.7	▲18.7
Left	Dietmar Strickrodt	5,192	27.3	▼3.6	6,269	32.8	▲1.7
CDU	Silvana Schäffer	4,309	22.6	▼13.5	3,615	18.9	▼11.6
SPD	Stephan Rückebeil	2,272	11.9	▼8.8	1,772	9.3	▼6.9
FDP	Maik Wehner	705	3.7		743	3.9	▲1.9
Greens	Paul Maaß	606	3.2		460	2.4	▼0.7
Free Voters	Mario Merten	390	2.0	▼4.4			
List-only parties					938	4.9	
Informal votes		335			287		
Total valid votes		19,036			19,084		
Turnout		19,371	60.8	▲12.0			
AfD gain from CDU	Majority	370	1.9				

=== 2014 election ===
State election (2014): Kyffhäuserkreis II
Notes:	Blue background denotes the winner of the electorate vote. Pink background denotes a candidate elected from their party list. Yellow background denotes an electorate win by a list member, or other incumbent. A ✓ or ✗ denotes status of any incumbent, win or lose respectively.						
Party	Candidate	Votes	%	±%	Party votes	%	±%
CDU	✓ Gudrun Holbe	5,824	36.1	▼0.8	4,958	30.5	▼0.5
Left	Dietmar Strickrodt	4,985	30.9	▼3.7	5,068	31.1	▼0.6
SPD	Uwe Ludwig	3,352	20.7	▼3.0	2,635	16.2	▼3.7
AfD					1,466	9.0	
Free Voters	Mario Merten	1,031	6.4		296	1.8	▼0.4
NPD	Steffen Herzog	963	6.0	▲1.2	784	4.8	▲0.4
Greens					498	3.1	▼1.0
List-only parties					576	3.5	
Informal votes		426			300		
Total valid votes		16,155			16,281		
Turnout		16,581	48.8	▼3.1			
CDU hold	Majority	839	5.2	▲2.9			

=== 2009 election ===
State election (2009): Kyffhäuserkreis II
Notes:	Blue background denotes the winner of the electorate vote. Pink background denotes a candidate elected from their party list. Yellow background denotes an electorate win by a list member, or other incumbent. A ✓ or ✗ denotes status of any incumbent, win or lose respectively.						
Party	Candidate	Votes	%	±%	Party votes	%	±%
CDU	✓ Gudrun Holbe	6,821	36.9	▼10.0	5,790	31.0	▼14.7
Left	Torsten Blümel	6,397	34.6	▲2.9	5,928	31.7	▲4.8
SPD	Andreas Räuber	4,380	23.7	▲6.6	3,714	19.9	▲5.9
FDP					1,128	6.0	▲2.8
NPD	Steffen Herzog	890	4.8		819	4.4	▲2.4
Greens					766	4.1	▲1.3
List-only parties					542	2.9	
Informal votes		592			393		
Total valid votes		18,488			18,687		
Turnout		19,080	51.9	▲4.0			
CDU hold	Majority	424	2.3	▼12.9			

=== 2004 election ===
State election (2004): Kyffhäuserkreis II
Notes:	Blue background denotes the winner of the electorate vote. Pink background denotes a candidate elected from their party list. Yellow background denotes an electorate win by a list member, or other incumbent. A ✓ or ✗ denotes status of any incumbent, win or lose respectively.						
Party	Candidate	Votes	%	±%	Party votes	%	±%
CDU	Gudrun Holbe	8,243	46.9	▼0.9	8,041	45.7	▼3.8
PDS	Kersten Naumann	5,567	31.7	▲9.0	4,741	26.9	▲5.5
SPD	Andreas Räuber	3,000	17.1	▼7.0	2,467	14.0	▼5.8
FDP	Horst Grunert	764	4.3	▲2.1	558	3.2	▲1.9
List-only parties					1,791	10.1	
Informal votes		965			941		
Total valid votes		17,574			17,598		
Turnout		18,539	47.9	▼7.8			
CDU hold	Majority	2,676	15.2	▼8.5			

=== 1999 election ===
State election (1999): Kyffhäuserkreis II
Notes:	Blue background denotes the winner of the electorate vote. Pink background denotes a candidate elected from their party list. Yellow background denotes an electorate win by a list member, or other incumbent. A ✓ or ✗ denotes status of any incumbent, win or lose respectively.						
Party	Candidate	Votes	%	±%	Party votes	%	±%
CDU	✓ Detlev Braasch	10,347	47.8	▲4.5	10,791	49.5	▲5.0
SPD		5,226	24.1	▼8.0	4,317	19.8	▼10.9
PDS		4,921	22.7	▲8.3	4,675	21.4	▲5.7
REP		677	3.1		205	0.9	▼0.4
FDP		474	2.2	▼3.7	284	1.3	▼2.2
List-only parties					1,524	7.0	
Informal votes		501			350		
Total valid votes		21,645			21,796		
Turnout		22,146	55.7	▼15.8			
CDU hold	Majority	5,121	23.7	▲12.7			

=== 1994 election ===
State election (1994): Kyffhäuserkreis II
Notes:	Blue background denotes the winner of the electorate vote. Pink background denotes a candidate elected from their party list. Yellow background denotes an electorate win by a list member, or other incumbent. A ✓ or ✗ denotes status of any incumbent, win or lose respectively.						
Party	Candidate	Votes	%	±%	Party votes	%	±%
CDU	Detlev Braasch	11,705	43.2		12,108	44.5	
SPD		8,715	32.2		8,354	30.7	
PDS		3,895	14.4		4,285	15.7	
FDP		1,585	5.8		940	3.5	
Greens		1,199	4.4		848	3.1	
List-only parties					699	2.6	
Informal votes		1,083			948		
Total valid votes		27,099			27,234		
Turnout		28,182	71.5				
CDU win new seat	Majority	2,990	11.0				
