= MMTS (meteorology) =

A Maximum Minimum Temperature System or MMTS is a temperature recording system that keeps track of the maximum and minimum temperatures that have occurred over some given time period.

The earliest, and still perhaps most familiar, form is the Maximum minimum thermometer invented by James Six in 1782.

Today a typical MMTS is a thermistor. This may be read locally or can transmit its results electronically.

== See also ==
- SNOTEL
