= Cotts (surname) =

Cotts is a surname. Notable people with the surname include:

- Campbell Cotts (1902–1964), South African-British actor
- Neal Cotts (born 1980), American baseball player
- William Cotts (1871–1932), Scottish businessman and politician
- Susan Cotts Watkins (born 1938), American demographer

== See also ==
- Cotts baronets
- Cott (surname)
- Potts (surname)
