= Serge Santucci =

French sculptor and medallist

Serge Santucci (born in 1944 in Salernes) is a French sculptor and medallist.

== Training and Career ==
He is a student of Raymond Corbin, professor of sculpture and engraving medals at the National School of Fine Arts in Paris. In 1971, Santucci won the Grand Prix de sculpture artistique at the Casa de Velázquez in Madrid. In the 1970s he designed the UNESCO medal for Rubens Year.
