= Salernes =

- Commune
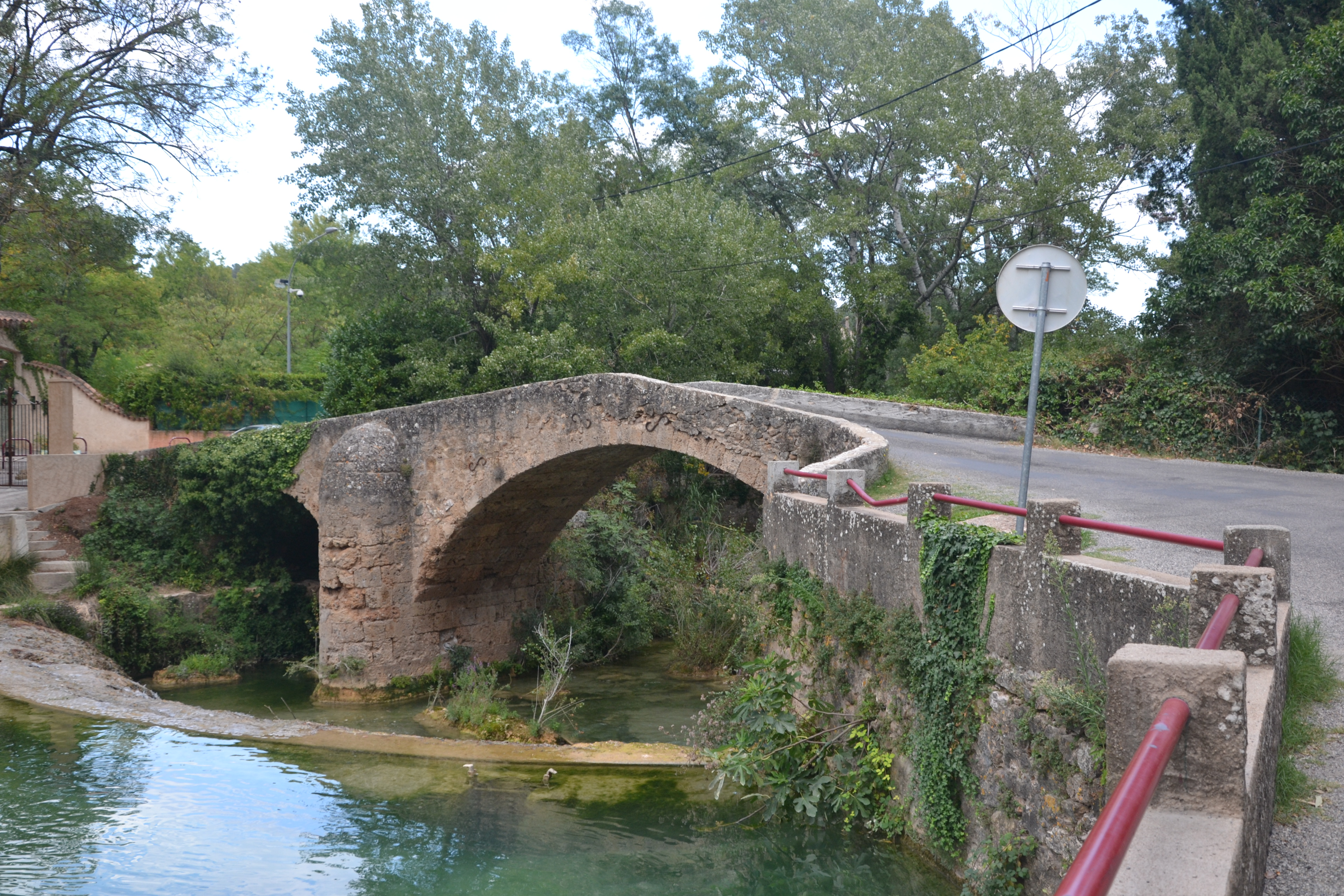
- Gourgaret bridge, over the Bresque river in Salernes.

- Coat of arms
- Location of Salernes
- Location within France Location within Provence-Alpes-Côte d'Azur
- Coordinates: 43°33′00″N 6°14′00″E
- Country: France
- Region: Provence-Alpes-Côte d'Azur
- Department: Var
- Arrondissement: Draguignan
- Canton: Flayosc
- Intercommunality: CA Dracénie Provence Verdon

Government
  - Mayor (2024–2026): Marie Laure Tortosa
- Area^{1}: 39.3 km^{2} (15.2 sq mi)
- Elevation: 221 m (725 ft)
- Highest elevation: 481 m (1,578 ft)
- Lowest elevation: 184 m (604 ft)
- Population (2023): 4,019
  - Density: 102/km^{2} (265/sq mi)
- Demonym: Salernois
- Time zone: UTC+01:00 (CET)
  - Summer (DST): UTC+02:00 (CEST)
- INSEE/Postal code: 83121 /83690
- ^{1} French Land Register data, which excludes lakes, ponds, glaciers > 1 km^{2} (0.386 sq mi or 247 acres) and river estuaries.

Salernes (French pronunciation: [salɛʁn]; Occitan: Salèrna) is a commune in the Var department in the Provence-Alpes-Côte d'Azur region in southeastern France.

== Population ==
Historical population
Year	Pop.	±% p.a.
1968	2,362	—
1975	2,469	+0.63%
1982	2,882	+2.23%
1990	3,012	+0.55%
1999	3,269	+0.91%
2007	3,629	+1.31%
2012	3,764	+0.73%
2017	3,840	+0.40%
2023	4,019	+0.76%
Source: INSEE

== Notable people ==
- Paul Cotte (1825-1907), politician
- Jacques de Bourbon Busset (1912-2001), novelist, essayist and diplomat
- Serge Santucci (born 1944), sculptor

== See also ==
- Communes of the Var department
