= Van Cott =

Van Cott is a surname. Notable people with the surname include:

- Cornelius Van Cott (1838–1904), American politician and baseball executive
- Daniel M. Van Cott (died 1903), American politician from New York
- George E. Van Cott (1906–1972), American politician
- John Van Cott (1814–1883), American Mormon general authority and missionary
- Margaret Newton Van Cott (1830–1914), American Methodist Episcopal preacher
- William H. Van Cott (1821–1908), American jurist and baseball pioneer

== See also ==
- Mount Van Cott, a mountain in Utah
- Cott (surname)
