= Sergio Cotta =

Italian philosopher, jurist and academic (1920–2007)

- Professor Sergio Cotta
- Born: 6 October 1920; Florence, Italy
- Died: 3 May 2007 (aged 86); Florence, Italy
- Citizenship: Italian
- Education: University of Florence
- Scientific career
- Fields: Philosophy of law Existentialism; Phenomenology; Law of Italy
- Workplaces: University of Florence

Sergio Cotta (6 October 1920 – 3 May 2007) was an Italian philosopher, jurist and university professor. He was considered a specialist on the political thought of the Enlightenment. Cotta, along with André Masson and Robert Shackleton, was considered the most important interpreter of Montesquieu during the 20th century.

Cotta was educated in Florence, attending the La Querce Barnabiti Institute and the University of Florence. During the Second World War, he was a resistance fighter against German occupation. He was the commander of a partisans Brigade of the VII Divisione Autonoma Monferrato and was decorated with the Italian bronze medal. His academic career took him to a variety of institutions, but he was primarily based at the Sapienza University of Rome from 1966 to 1990.

== Biography ==
Sergio Cotta was born to Alberto Cotta, who was a scholar of forestry sciences, and Mary Nicolis di Robilant, of the aristocratic Robilant family. A direct descendant of the mathematician Leonhard Euler, he studied in Florence at the La Querce Barnabiti Institute and then enrolled at the Faculty of Political Science at the University of Florence where he graduated in 1945.

On 8 September 1943, in Friuli, he was called to arms with the rank of Lieutenant, after the signing of the Italian armistice. With the German army losing, he sailed along the Adriatic to reach unoccupied Italy. After catching malaria, he reached Piedmont, where he was posted to a partisan brigade, the 7th Autonomous Division "Monferrato", as the commander of the 2nd Brigade. He was among the first to enter Turin on the days of liberation. For his participation in the Italian resistance movement, on 24 September 1951, he was awarded the Bronze Medal of Military Valor and on 31 March 1952, the War Cross.

In 1945 he married Brozolo Elisabetta Radicati of Brozolo. The couple went on to have three children: Irene, Maurizio, and Gabriella.

=== Academic career ===
He started his career at the University of Turin as assistant to Norberto Bobbio. He was promoted to ordinary professor, going on to teach at the University of Perugia, University of Trieste, University of Trento, University of Florence and finally in Rome. He was one of the promoters of the Faculty of Law of the D'Annunzio University in Teramo, where he taught philosophy of law. He held a position at the Sapienza University of Rome from 1966 to 1990, becoming the Chair of the philosophy of law and, for some years, was also the director of the homonymous Institute Giorgio Del Vecchio. Retiring in 1995, he became a professor emeritus.

He was a corresponding member of the Turin Academy of Sciences (from 1965) and the 1995 national member of the Accademia dei Lincei. He was a corresponding member of the Institut de France and the Académie des Sciences Morales et Politiques, and a member of the National Academy of Sciences of Argentina. He was twice president of the Sorbonne International Center of Applied Political Philosophy (French: Institut international de philosophie politique).

He held the position of President of the Union of Italian Catholic Jurists and of the International Union of Catholic Jurists. He was among the members of the Promoter Committee of the 1974 Referendum of the Divorce Act.

His students included Francesco D'Agostino, Bruno Montanari, Gaetano Carcaterra, Bruno Romano, Domenico Fisichella and the singer Antonello Venditti.

== Research ==
After studying the political thought of the Enlightenment, Cotta's interests focused on the philosophy of law, which he was able to blend with elements of the phenomenological tradition. From the 1950s he published many articles and monographs on the political vision of Montesquieu, Gaetano Filangieri, St. Thomas Aquinas and St. Augustine, devoting himself to theoretical reflections on law and politics. He was the director of the International Magazine of Philosophy of Law. His works have been translated into French, Greek, English, Portuguese and Spanish.

== Honours ==
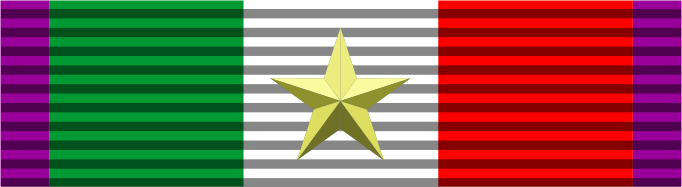
Gold Medal of the Italian Order of Merit for Culture and Art, Rome 5 September 1995

- Bronze Medal of Military Valor (24 October 1951)
- War Merit Cross (31 March 1952)
- Grand Officer of the Order of Merit of the Republic (27 December 2003)
- First-class cross of the merits of the science and Culture of the Austrian Republic (14-9-1998)
- Knight of the Grand Cross of the Order of St. Sylvester Pope.

== Publications ==
- Cotta, Sergio (1953). Montesquieu e la scienza della societá [Montesquieu and the science of society]. Publicazioni dell'Istituto di Scienze Politiche dell'Università di Torino. Vol. 2. Torino: Ramella. OCLC 920071897.
- Cotta, Sergio (1954). Gaetano Filangieri e il problema della legge [Gaetano Filangieri and the law problem]. Memorie dell'Istituto giuridico (Università di Torino. Istituto giuridico), ser. 2, memoria 86. Torino: Giappichelli. OCLC 23075966.
- The concept of law in the Summa Theologiae of Saint Thomas Aquinas (Italian: Il concetto di legge nella Summa Theologiae di San Tommaso d'Aquino), Turin, Giappichelli, 1955
- The Political City of St. Augustine (Italian: La città politica di S. Agostino), 1960
- Philosophy and Politics in Rousseau’s Work (Italian: Filosofia e politica nell'opera di Rousseau), 1964
- The technological challenge (Italian: La sfida tecnologica), 1968
- Ptolemaic man (Italian: Luomo tolemaico), 1975
- What resistance? (Italian: Quale Resistenza?), 1977
- The Ptolemaic Man (Spanish: El hombre tolemaico), Ediciones RIALP, Madrid 1977
- Why violence (Italian: Perché la violenza), 1978
- Justification and Obligation of the Standards (Italian: Giustificazione e obbligatorietà delle norme), 1981
- Cotta, Sergio (1991). Il diritto nell'esistenza:linee di ontofenomenologia giuridica [Law in existence. Lines of legal ontophenomenology]. Milano: Giuffré. ISBN 9788814027338. OCLC 848629174.
- Why violence? A philosophical interpretation (Italian: Why violence ? A philosophical interpretation), University of Florida Press, Gainesville, 1985
- From War to Peace (Italian: Dalla guerra alla pace), 1989
- Law, Person, Human World (Italian: Diritto, persona, mondo umano), 1989
- The Right to Existence (Italian: Il diritto nell'esistenza, edizione ampliata), Extended Edition, 1991
- The political thought of Montesquieu (Italian: Il pensiero politico di Montesquieu), Bari, Laterza, 1995
- Cotta, Sergio; Rocher, Emmanuel (1996). Le droit dans l'existence: éléments d'une ontophénoménologie juridique [Law in Existence: Elements of a Legal Onto-phenomenology]. Bordeaux: Éd. Bière. ISBN 2852760657. OCLC 65171272.
- Cotta, Sergio (1997). Soggetto umano, soggetto giuridico [Human subject, legal subject]. Milan: Giuffrè. ISBN 8814065039.
- Cotta, Sergio (2002). I limiti della politica [The Limit of Politics]. Bologna: Il Mulino. ISBN 8815090002.
- Cotta, Sergio (2004). Il diritto come sistema di valori [Law as a value system]. Le ragioni del diritto, 2. San Paolo: Cinisello Balsamo. ISBN 9788821550416. OCLC 876525826.
- Cotta, Sergio (2015). Bauzon, Stéphane; Melkevik, Bjarne; Terré, François (eds.). Ontologie du phénomène juridique [Ontology of the legal phenomenon] (in French). Paris: Dalloz. ISBN 9782247152612. OCLC 908234495.
- Cotta, Sergio (23 February 2017). Perché il diritto [Why Law?] (in Italian). La Scuola. ISBN 8835043719.

== Bibliography ==
- Montanari, Bruno (4 May 2021). "Sergio Cotta. Philosopher of law and philosopher of the 20th century… and beyond". Forum. Supplement to Acta Philosophica. 5 (2): 485–518. doi:10.17421/2498-9746-05-29.
- Zini, Francesco (2020). Il dovere di essere: attualità nel pensiero di Sergio Cotta [The Duty to Be: Relevance in Sergio Cotta's Thought] (in Italian). Roma: Studium edizioni. ISBN 9788838248818.
