= Ursula Cotta =

German benefactor (1450–1511)

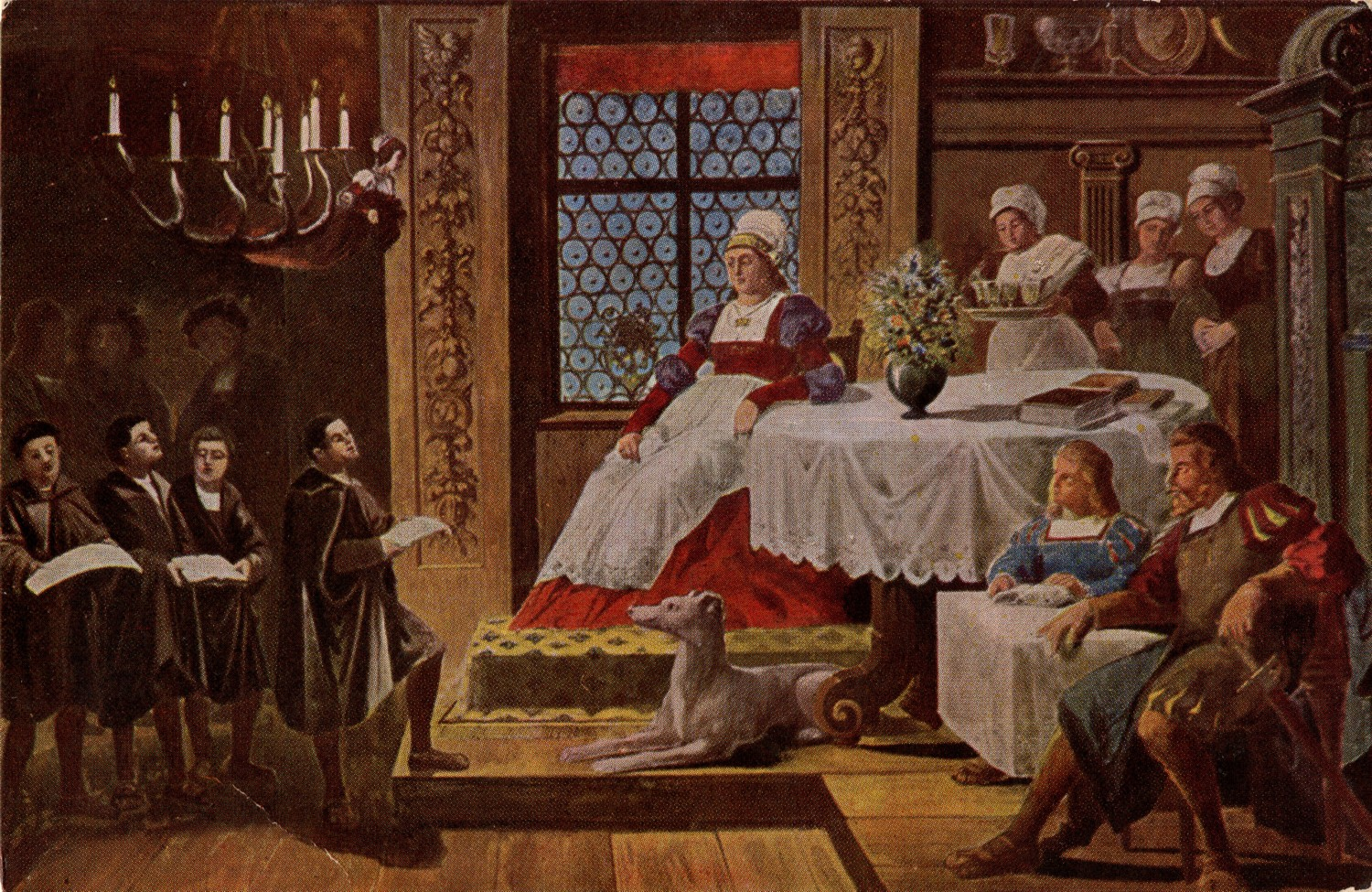
Luther as a choirboy singing in front of Frau Cotta, after a painting by Prof. Weiß in the Luther House in Eisenach

Ursula Cotta (née Schalbe, 1450 – 29 November 1511), also known as Ursula van Cotta, was a German benefactor in Eisenach. She took in and supported the young Martin Luther during his school years at the Georgenschule in Eisenach from 1498 to 1501.

== Biography ==
Cotta was born as Ursula Schalbe. Her father was Heinrich Schalbe, a landowner of Ilfeld and Burgomaster of Hefield from 1495 to 1499 and her mother was Angelika Schalbe (née Gelen). Her husband Conrad Cotta was a rich patrician in Eiesenach.

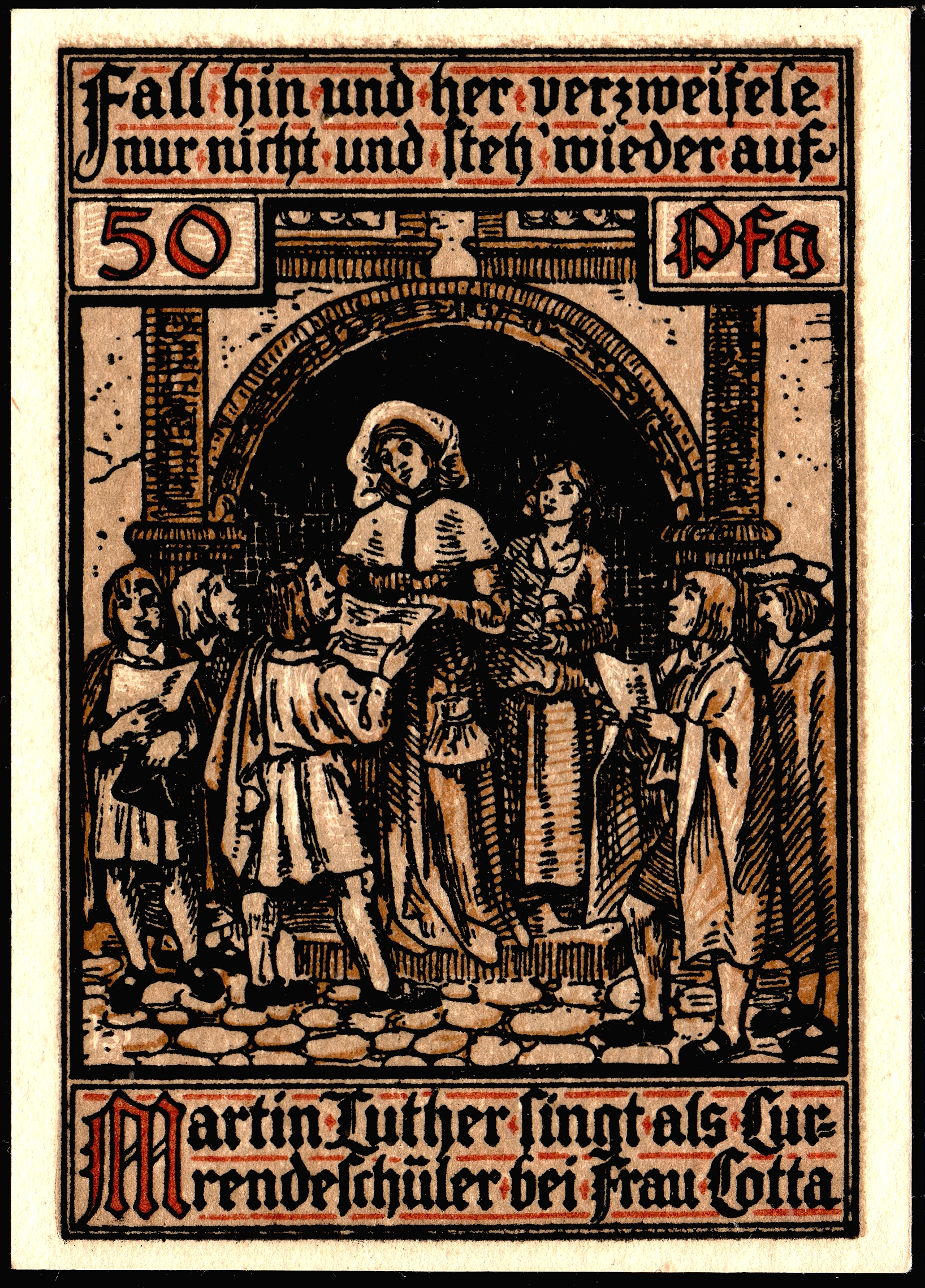
50 Pfennig Notgeld banknote of Eisenach (1921) in honour of the 400-years-anniversary of Martin Luther's arrival at the Wartburg. Luther is shown singing for Frau Cotta with other boys

Cotta took in and supported the young Martin Luther as a foster mother from 1498 to 1501. She took him in after she heard him singing as a mendicant, supporting his attendance to a Franciscan school and enabling his learning when it seemed he would otherwise have to discontinue his education.

Cotta gave Luther his first instrument, a flute. He also tutored Cotta's son and Kaspar Schalbe, her younger brother.

Cotta's role in his Luther's was recounted by his first biographer, Johannes Mathesius. Mittenzwey calls her an influencing factor in his life and career.

Cotta is represented in an engraving by Gustav Ferdinand Leopold Konig, in a painting in the Luther House in Eisenach and on a 50 Pfennig notgeld of the city of Eisenach (1921). In some imagery Luther is shown signing outside her door for bread.
