= Rutherford-type minimum thermometer =

Type of registering thermometer

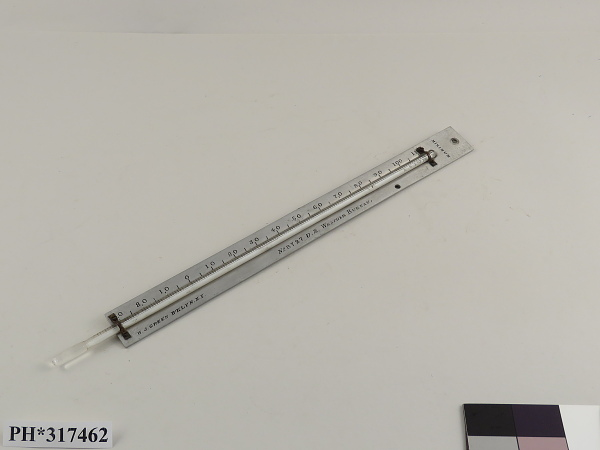
Alcohol-in-glass Rutherford-type minimum thermometer.

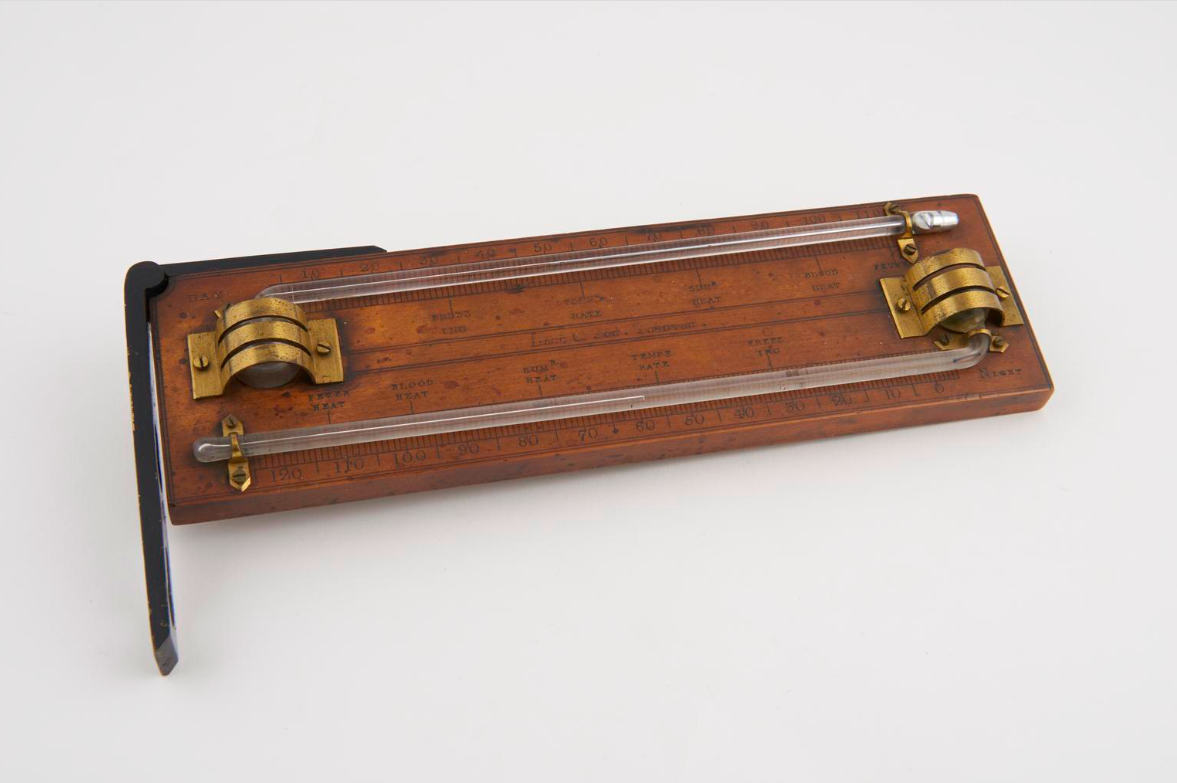
A Rutherford thermometer assembly capable of taking minimum and maximum temperatures made in 1794 in England. (Science Museum, London)

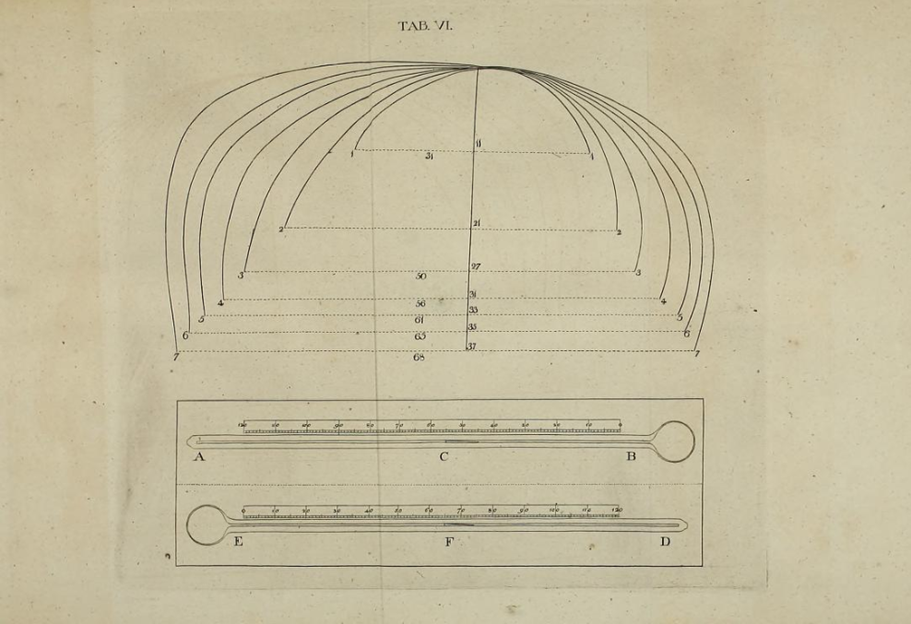
Diagram by John Rutherford showing a representation of his minimum and maximum thermometers on a frame

A Rutherford-type minimum thermometer, also known as a minimum thermometer or alcohol-in-glass Rutherford-type thermometer, is a type of registering thermometer. It is the first type of thermometer capable of recording minimum temperatures. It, along with the first maximum thermometer, was invented in early, or prior to, 1790, by John Rutherford, M. D. of Middle Balilish. These inventions were made public by Daniel Rutherford when he communicated a description of these thermometers to the Royal Society of Edinburgh on 5 April 1790. Daniel Rutherford mentioned that John Rutherford had communicated a description and a diagram of these thermometers "some time ago", and that John had allowed him to make this communication to the Royal Society of Edinburgh (likely because John Rutherford wasn't a member of the Royal Society of Edinburgh and thus could not make this communication himself). The father of Daniel Rutherford was also called John Rutherford, but these were two distinct persons.

== Description ==
The thermometer consists of a glass tube ending in a bulb, initially containing "a common spirit of wine" (i.e., ~94% ethanol solution), later replaced with normal amyl alcohol (pentanol) to reduce risk of distillation. A lightweight conical index is present in the tube. The index was initially made of colored glass or enamel ivory. The thermometer is hung horizontally. When temperatures decrease, the spirit contracts, and because of the surface tension of the liquid, it drags the index by its tip along with it. When the temperatures rise, the spirit dilates and passes beyond the index, leaving it in place, thus marking the lowest temperature reached until the index was last reset, or until temperatures further decrease. To reset it, the thermometer is momentarily tilted vertically, bulb-side up, and by gravity the index will quickly falls back to the end of the spirit column but no farther.

Initially, this minimum thermometer was placed on a small wooden frame along with a maximum thermometer, which recorded maximum temperatures. This maximum thermometer used mercury, and the index was initially a small piece of ivory, but later versions used a small steel rod. As the temperatures increases, the mercury expands in the glass column, thus pushing the index, and as the temperatures decrease and the mercury contracts and retreat, the index was left in place, thus recording the maximum temperature reached. The minimum and maximum thermometers had to be placed with their bulbs in opposite directions to enable the reset of indices in both thermometers simultaneously by tilting the apparatus by about 90°.
