= Jens Cotta =

German politician (born 1972)

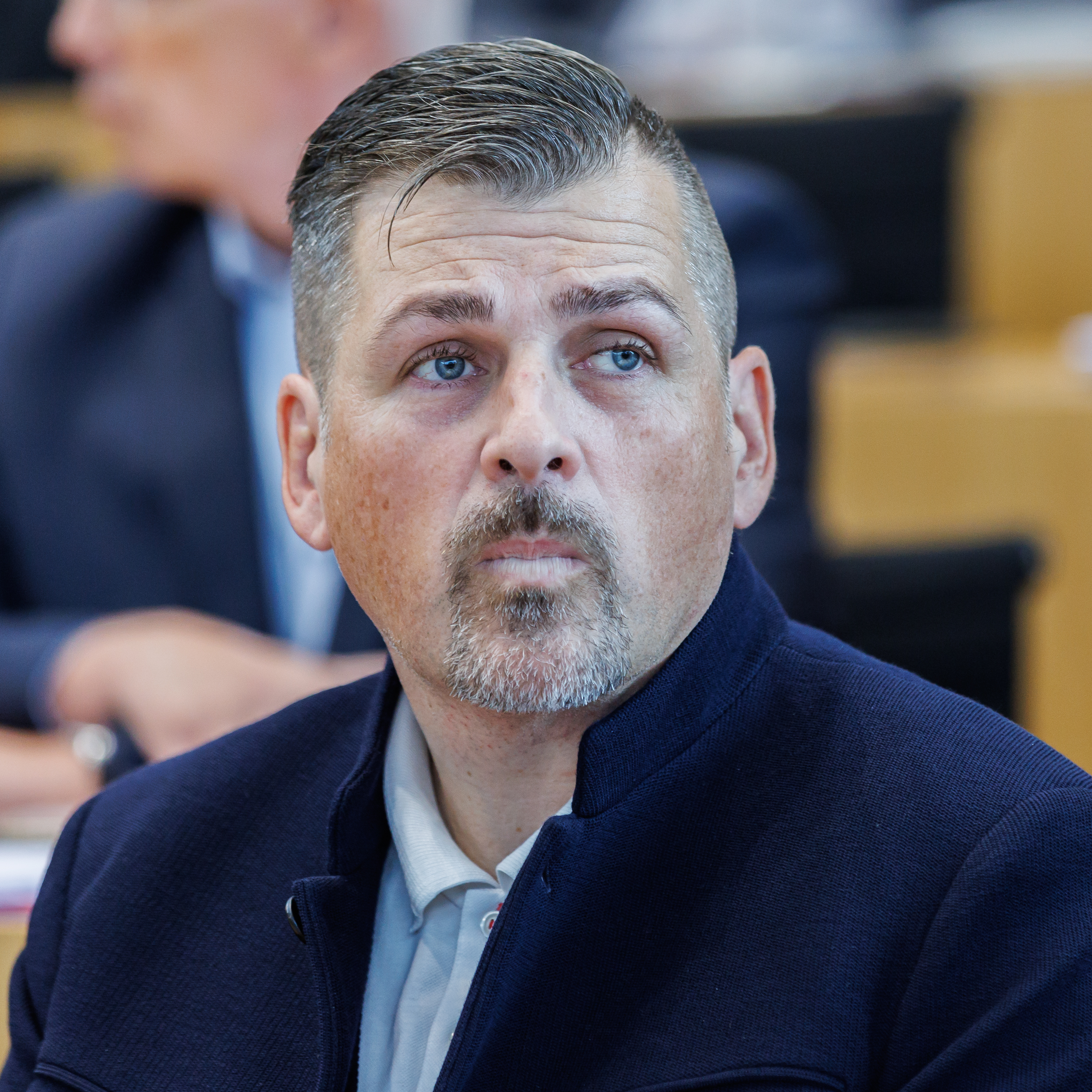
- Cotta in 2024

Member of the Landtag of Thuringia
- Incumbent
- Assumed office 26 November 2019
- Preceded by: Gudrun Holbe
- Constituency: Kyffhäuserkreis II

Personal details
- Born: 9 November 1972 (age 53)
- Party: Alternative for Germany (since 2016)

Jens Cotta (born 9 November 1972) is a German politician serving as a member of the Landtag of Thuringia since 2019. He has served as deputy group leader of the Alternative for Germany since 2025.
