= Six's thermometer =

Type of thermometer

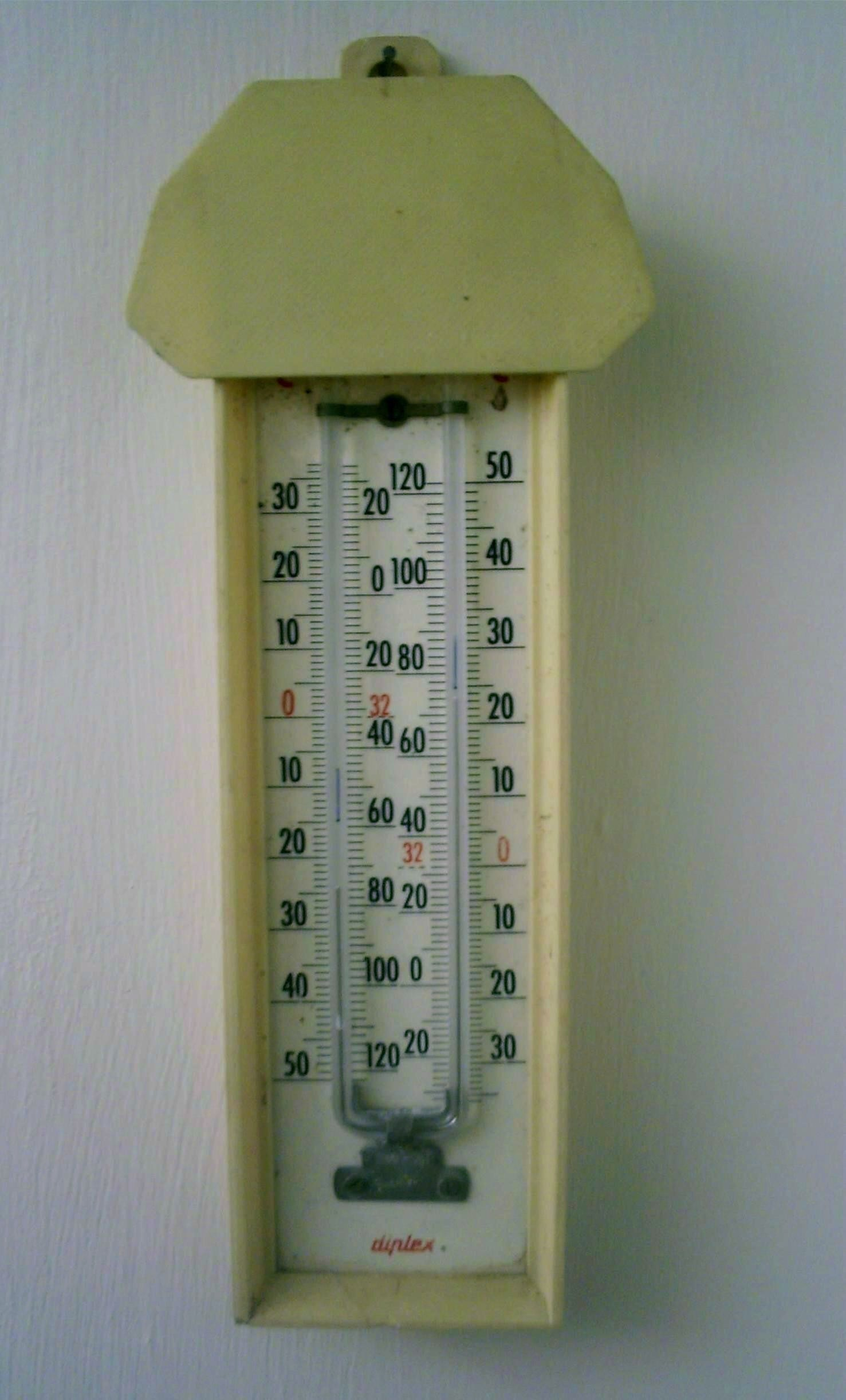
A maximum–minimum thermometer. The scales are Fahrenheit on the inside of the U and Celsius on the outside. The current temperature is 23 degrees Celsius, the maximum recorded is 25, and the minimum is 15; both read from the base of the small markers in each arm of the U tube. The bulbs are hidden by a plastic housing.

Six's maximum and minimum thermometer is a registered thermometer that can record the maximum and minimum temperatures reached over a period of time, for example 24 hours. It is used to record the extremes of temperature at a location, for instance in meteorology and horticulture. It was invented by the British scientist James Six, in 1780; the same basic design remains in use.

It is also commonly known as a maximum–minimum, minimum–maximum, maxima–minima or minima–maxima thermometer, of which it is the earliest practical design.

The thermometer indicates the current temperature, and the highest and lowest temperatures since the last reset. It is an early type thermometer able to record both minimum and maximum daily temperatures.

The Six's thermometer cannot measure temperatures below -38.8 °C due to the solidification of mercury at this temperature. Although this is not an issue in most inhabited places, it can be one in particularly cold places, where thermometers using different liquids should be used to record these lower temperatures, such as a Rutherford-type minimum thermometer.

== Description ==
Six's maximum and minimum thermometer consists of a U-shaped glass tube with two separate temperature scales set along each arm of the U. One of these is for recording the maximum temperature encountered and the other for the minimum temperature.

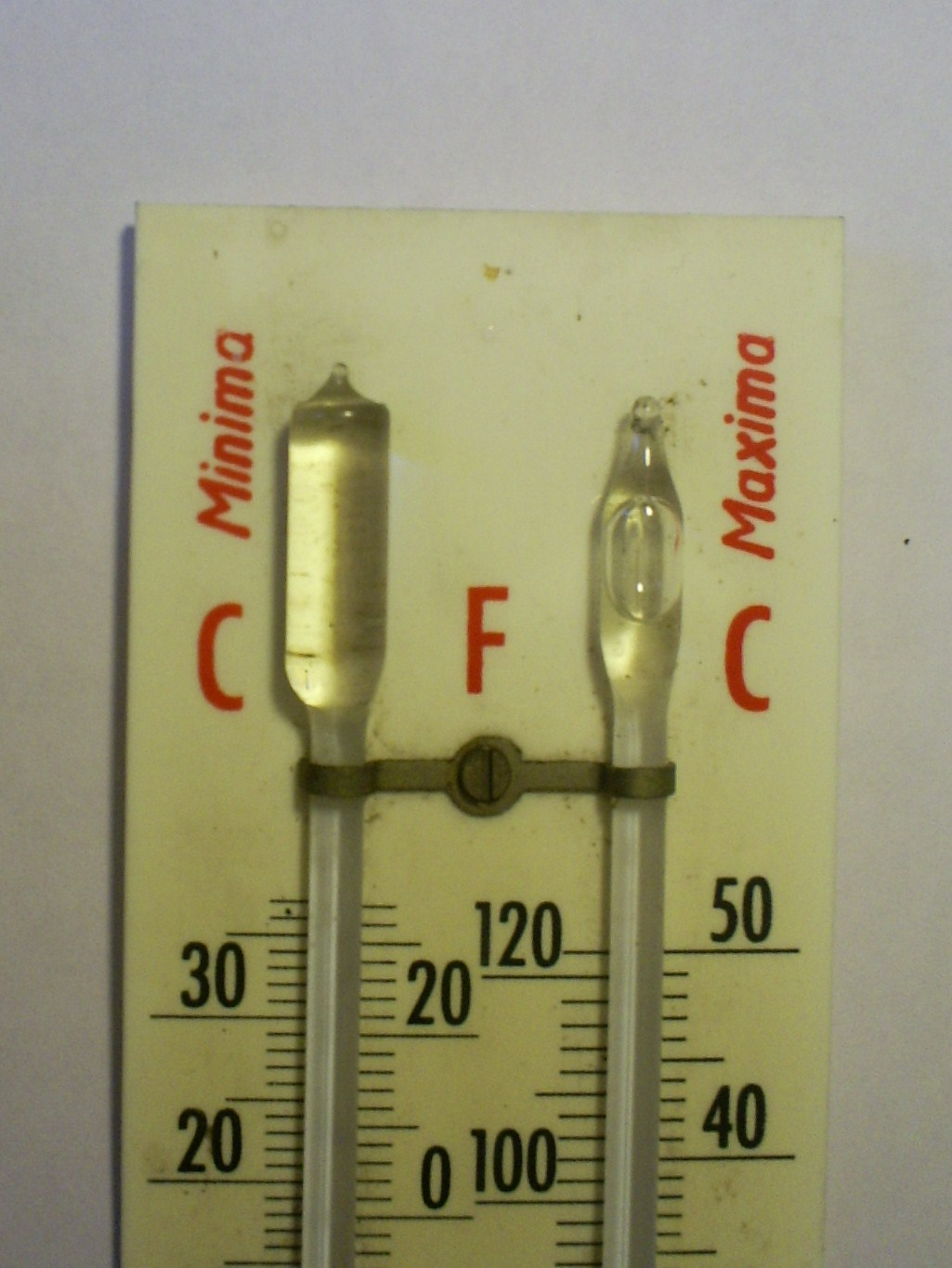
Detail of the thermometer bulbs of the maximum-minimum thermometer shown above. The left-hand (minimum arm) bulb is full of alcohol. This bulb measures the temperature by the expansion and contraction of the liquid. The right-hand (maximum arm) bulb contains alcohol and a bubble of low-pressure gas or alcohol vapor. This bulb accommodates the expansion in the other bulb and allows the train of alcohol and mercury to move in the U-shaped tube as the temperature changes.

In the bend of the U is a section of mercury, a metal that is liquid between −38.83 °C and 356.73 °C, which is pushed or pulled around the U by the thermal expansion and contraction of the alcohol in the first bulb as it responds to the external temperature. The vacuum in the other bulb allows free movement of the alcohol and mercury. It is the contraction/expansion of alcohol that measures the minimum temperature, and the contraction/expansion of both alcohol and mercury that measures the maximum temperature. The top of the mercury indicates the temperature reading on both scales. This is unlike a normal mercury thermometer, in which the expansion and contraction of mercury alone indicate temperature.

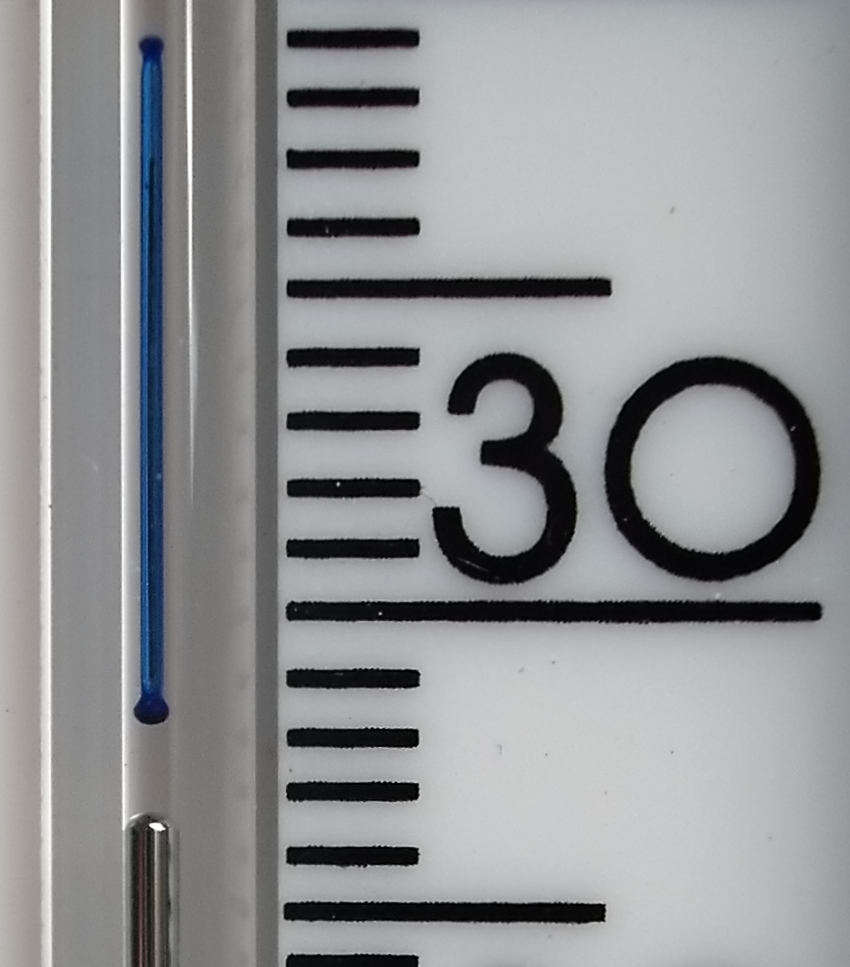
Marker showing the maximum temperature. Mercury has retreated to about 26.5°C as the temperature has dropped below its maximum of about 28.3°C.

The thermometer shows a reading at the top of the mercury section on both the maximum and minimum scales; this shows the current temperature and should be the same on both scales. If the two readings are not the same, then the instrument scales are not correctly positioned or the instrument is damaged.

The maximum and minimum readings are recorded by two small steel markers which are sprung into the capillary tube so that they can slide, but only if a force is applied to them, either by being pushed by the mercury or under the influence of an external magnet.

Once a reading is taken, the thermometer can be reset to record future min/max temperatures by moving the markers to the top of the mercury, which is performed by hand using a small magnet to slide them along the tube in early versions of this thermometer, or by pushing a button that pushes a magnetic plate on the back of the thermometer away from the glass tube in later versions. In these later versions, the indices are held in place by their magnetic attraction to the magnetic plate behind, so when the magnetic plate is pushed away, the indices fall down to the top of the mercury column by gravity. Any change in temperature after that will push one of the markers along with it (if the markers are not reset, they will register maxima and minima only if they exceed the values already encountered).

If the temperature rises, the maximum scale marker will be pushed. If it falls, the moving mercury will push the minimum scale marker. As the temperature varies, the markers will remain in their positions unless the temperature becomes higher (for maximum) or lower (for minimum) than already recorded, in which case the relevant marker is pushed further. The markers thus record the furthest point reached by the mercury in each arm of the tube, and thereby the highest and lowest temperatures since the last reset. Typically the thermometer is reset every 24 hours to measure the diurnal temperature variation, the positions of the ends of the markers nearest to the mercury are examined. Their positions on the maximum and minimum scales show the highest and lowest temperatures encountered since the last reset.

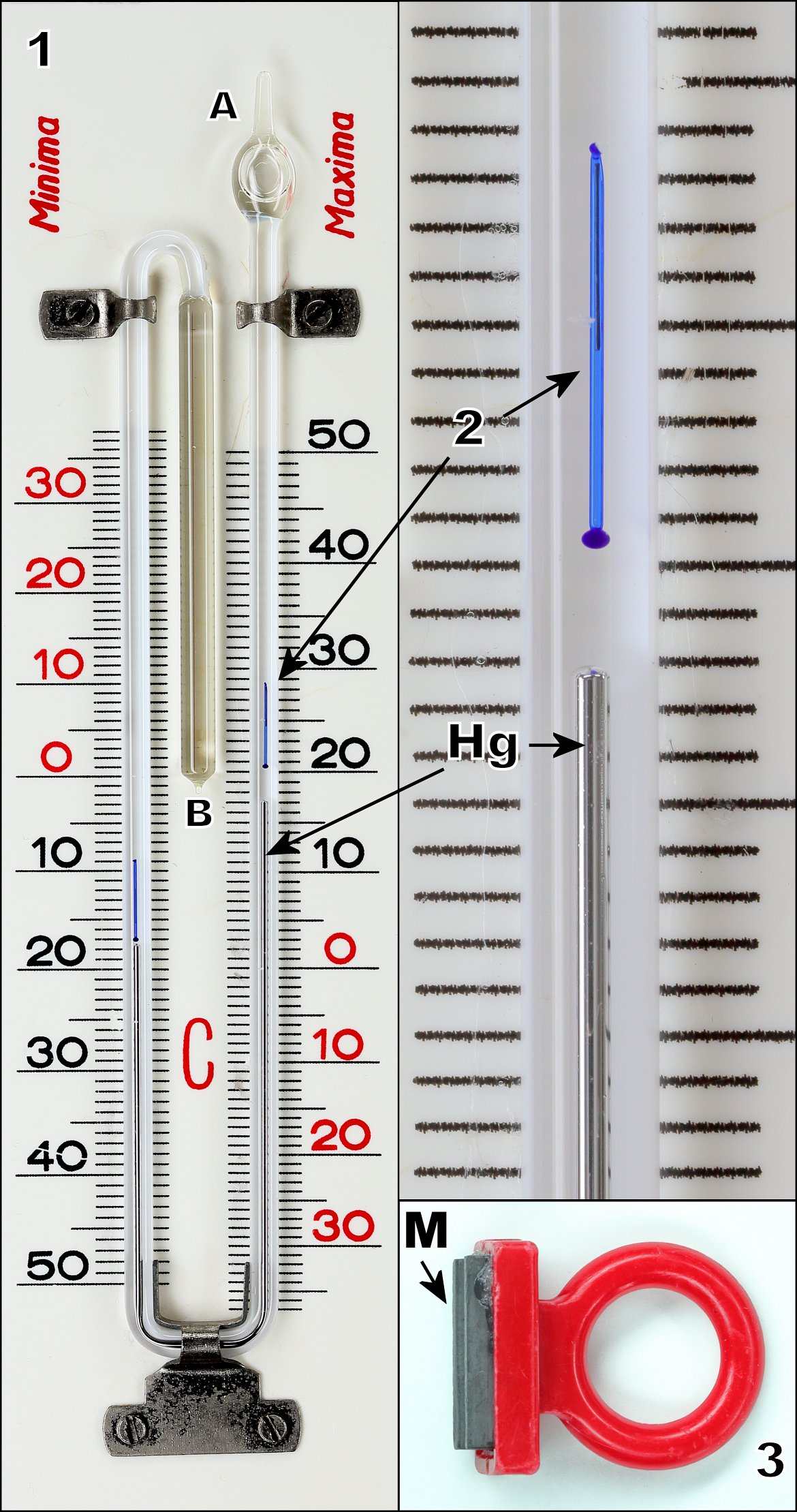
Early version of a Six's thermometer with magnified section: 1: Entire thermometer; 2: Section of tube showing maximum temperature reading and index; 3: Magnet to move the indices; Hg: Mercury, which pushes the indices; M: Magnet for resetting the indices.

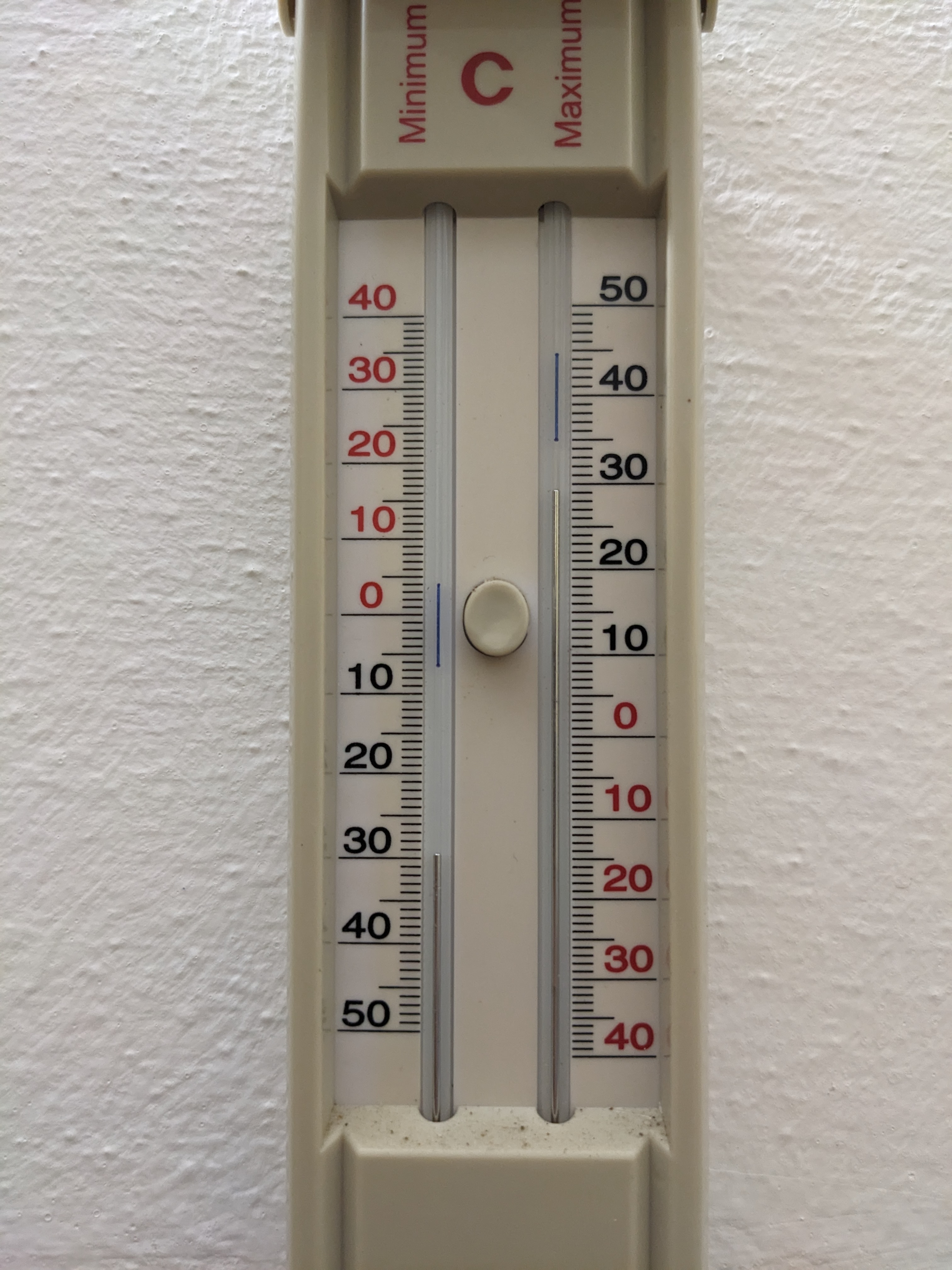
Later version of a Six's thermometer with a push button to reset the minimum and maximum indices.

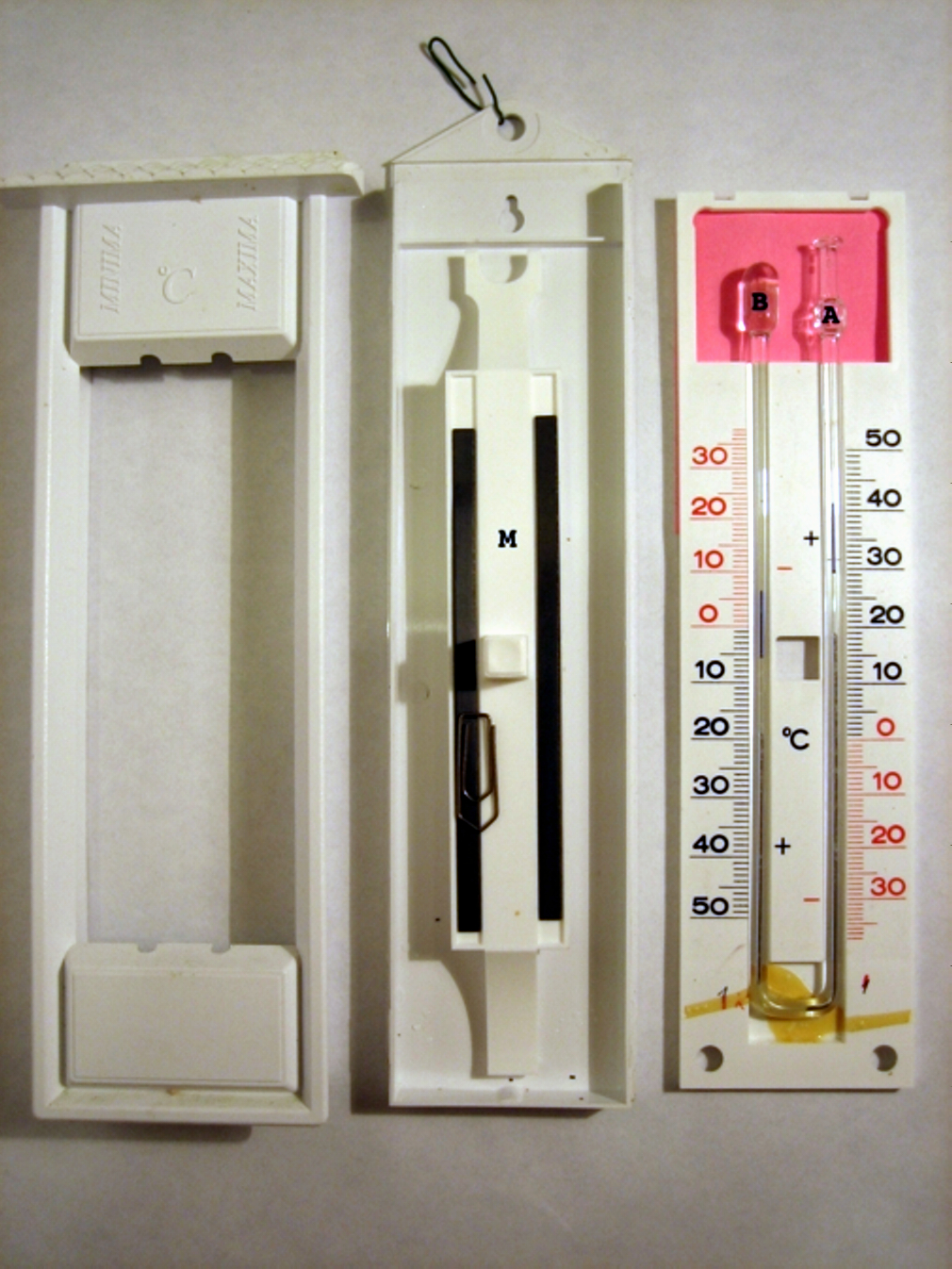
Disasembled later version of a Six's thermometer with a push button to reset the minimum and maximum indices.✓✓

== Design variations ==
In a variation of design, some models have unsprung markers held in place by a magnetic plate located behind the card showing the scales and close enough to the U-shaped tube to hold the markers in place unless they are pushed by the thermal expansion of the device. When manual control is operated, the plate is pushed away from the U-shaped tube, freeing the markers which then drop under gravity to the surface of the mercury.

Another design has the U orientated horizontally and the markers completely free and unsprung. The reset is carried out by turning the U to the vertical so the markers sink to rest on the mercury, and returning it to the horizontal.

== Mercury-free maximum–minimum thermometers ==
The original Six's thermometer design contains mercury, which has been banned for most uses in the European Union and some other parts of the world.

In 2006, S.Brannan & Sons Ltd, a UK company, was granted a patent for a mercury-free version of Six's maximum-minimum thermometer: instead of alcohol and mercury two other immiscible liquids are used as the expansion and transfer liquids in the same fashion as the mercury version to position magnetic markers. In the patent, toluene was chosen as the expansion liquid and calcium bromide was chosen as the transfer liquid.

Electronic thermometers often include a maximum-minimum registering feature.

== See also ==
- Maximum minimum temperature system
