= Paul Cotte =

French politician (1825–1901)

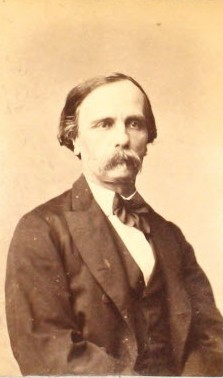
Paul Cotte

Paul Cotte (January 10, 1825 – January 2, 1901) was a French politician. From 1872 until 1881 he served under the Republican Union, and he was on the general counsel of his home town of Salernes from 1871 to 1878.
