= Cotti =

Cotti is an Italian surname. Notable people with the surname include:

- Aleksandra Cotti (born 1988), Italian water polo player
- Flavio Cotti (1939–2020), Swiss politician
- Morgan Lyon Cotti, American political scientist

== Other ==
- Cotti Coffee, Chinese coffee shop chain
