= Louis Cotte =

French meteorologist (1740–1815)

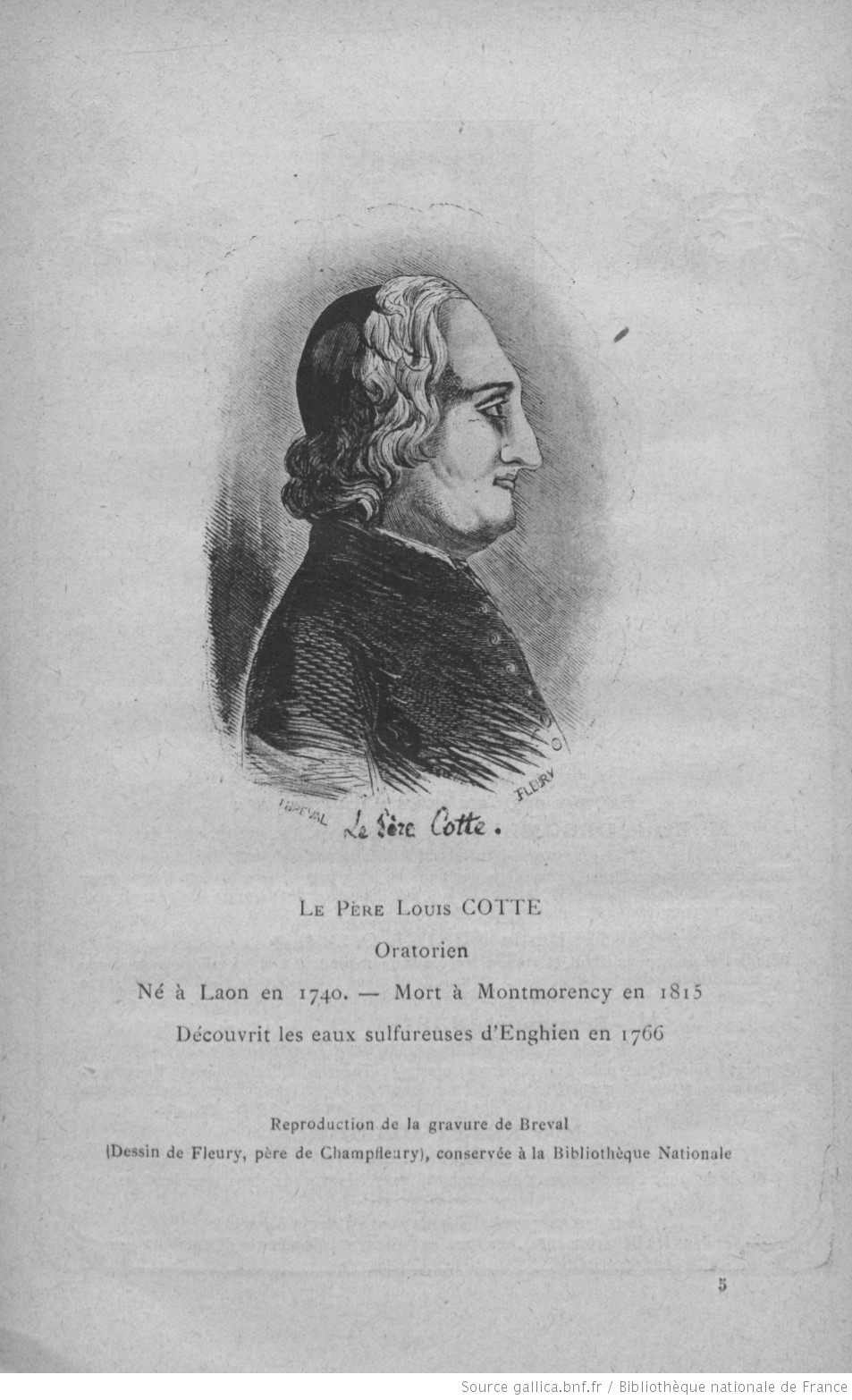
A drawing of Father Louis Cotte (oratorian and meteorologist) taken from guide-yearbook of Enghien-lès-Bains

Louis Cotte (20 November 1740 – 4 October 1815) was a French meteorologist.
