= Cott (surname) =

Cott is a surname. Notable people with this surname include:

- Casey Cott (born 1992), American actor
- Corey Cott (born 1990), American actor and singer
- Gerard Cott (1940–2023), Irish politician and teacher
- Gerry Cott (born 1954), Irish guitarist and songwriter
- Hugh B. Cott (1900–1987), British zoologist
- Jonathan Cott (born 1942), American author, journalist and editor
- Nancy F. Cott (born 1945), American historian and professor

== See also ==
- Cott (disambiguation)
- Cotts (surname)
- Van Cott
