= James Six =

British scientist and inventor (1731-1793)

James Six FRS (1731 – 25 August 1793) was a British scientist born in Canterbury. He is noted for his invention, in 1780, of Six's thermometer, commonly known as the maximum- minimum thermometer. This device is still in common use today and widely sold in garden centres.

== Life ==
Six was from a family of Huguenot refugees from the Continent who had settled in England in the reign of Queen Elizabeth I, and who had worked as silk weavers for generations. James Six himself had trained in the family business, but by his time this was in decline because of cheap imported silks from India and Persia.

He became interested in natural philosophy, and devoted himself to astronomy and meteorology. In 1782 The Royal Society of London published an account of the thermometer that Six had invented two years earlier. In 1784, Six was elected a Foreign Member of the American Philosophical Society in Philadelphia. He became a Fellow of the Royal Society in 1792, his election was the result of this and other papers he had published on meteorology.

In 1783 he performed a number of thermometrical measurements on Canterbury Cathedral in conjunction with Sir John Cullum, who wrote about them for Philosophical Transactions in "Account of extraordinary Frost, 23 June 1783", (Philosophical Transactions, lxxiv (1784)). These experiments showed that at night, and particularly on clear nights, the temperature near the ground became colder than air above it, now known to be caused by the radiative cooling of the ground, a result that Six called "extraordinary".

Six wrote about his invention in his book, The Construction and Use of a Thermometer for Showing the Extremes of Temperature in the Atmosphere, during the Observer's Absence, together with Experiments and Variations of Local Heat; and other Meteorological Observations. This was published posthumously in London, in 1794, a year after he died.

Six died in 1793; he and his wife Mary are buried in Westgate Church, Canterbury.
