= HM Excise =

One of the predecessors of HM Revenue and Customs (1643–1909)

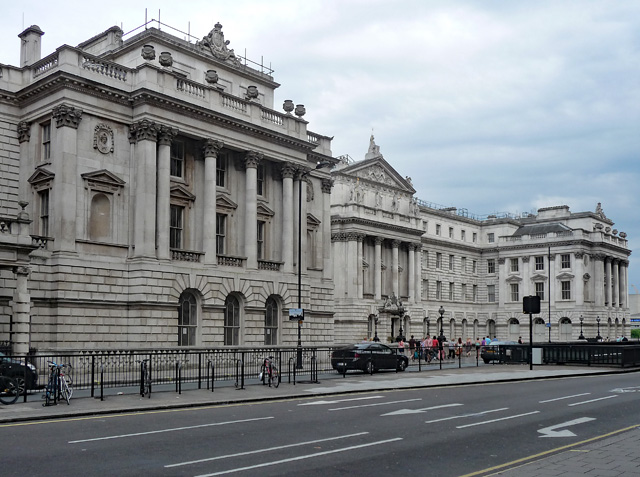
New Wing, Somerset House: home of the Inland Revenue's Excise Department from 1852 to 1909.

His or Her Majesty's Excise refers to 'inland' duties levied on articles at the time of their manufacture. Excise duty was first raised in England in 1643. Like HM Customs (a far older branch of the revenue services), the Excise was administered by a board of commissioners who were accountable to the Lords Commissioners of the Treasury. While 'HM Revenue of Excise' was a phrase used in early legislation to refer to this form of duty, the body tasked with its collection and general administration was usually known as the Excise Office.

In 1849 the Board of Excise was merged with the Board of Stamps and Taxes to form a new department: the Inland Revenue. Sixty years later the Excise department was demerged from the Inland Revenue and amalgamated with HM Customs to form HM Customs and Excise (which was itself amalgamated with the Inland Revenue in 2005 to create HM Revenue and Customs).

== Organisation ==
Following the example of HM Customs, the Board of Excise set up a network of administrative areas called 'collections' (each with its own collector). Unlike HM Customs, the Excise operated inland as well as on the coast: initially it had 39 collections in England (mostly corresponding with the English counties) and four in Wales; later its remit was extended to cover Scotland and Ireland as well. The collections were subdivided into districts (each overseen by a supervisor), which themselves had smaller subdivisions, known either as rides (if covered by an Excise officer on horseback) or divisions (also called footwalks), which were covered by an Excise officer on foot. (Note: By the 1840s there were 55 collections in England and Wales (excluding London) and 315 districts.)

=== Personnel ===
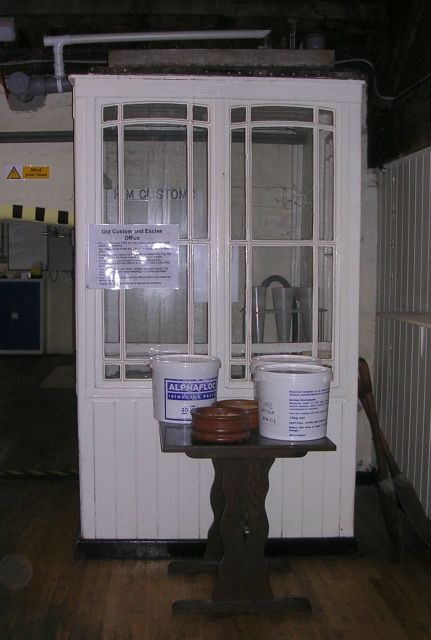
Gauger's office in Wadsworth Brewery.

Each Excise collector was required to tour his collection eight times a year, visiting each market town in turn in order to hold 'sittings' and receive revenue payments. In the intervening time, locally based Excise officers (known informally as excisemen or gaugers) would make regular visits to the manufacturers and retailers in order to assess the duty payable on relevant items and to issue 'vouchers' summarising the duty owed. Meanwhile, the supervisors would make regular spot-checks on the excisemen in their districts and report any anomalies or errors in their accounts.

This pattern of work remained the norm through the 18th and 19th centuries. In the 1820s, an excise officer (Joseph Pacy) wrote a detailed description of his daily routine, spent visiting a series of different manufacturers and retailers: chandlers, brewers, innkeepers, tanners, maltsters, distillers and tea and tobacco merchants (with substantial amounts of administrative work to be done in the intervening moments). The excise officer carried various specialist items of equipment for testing and measuring different dutiable products; for example the Sikes hydrometer (invented by an officer of Excise, Benjamin Sikes, in the 18th century and used by Excise officers from 1816 until 1980 for measuring the alcohol proof of spirits).

=== Excise licences ===
In order to be able to regulate and inspect the manufacture of dutiable products, the Excise Office issued licences to manufacturers (and it was then illegal for anyone to manufacture such items without a licence). Traders in some items were similarly licensed. In the late 18th century a duty was imposed on the licences themselves: Excise Licence Duty (the rate of which often varied depending on the scale of production) had to be paid in addition to any duty payable on the goods that were being manufactured or traded under licence.

=== Headquarters ===
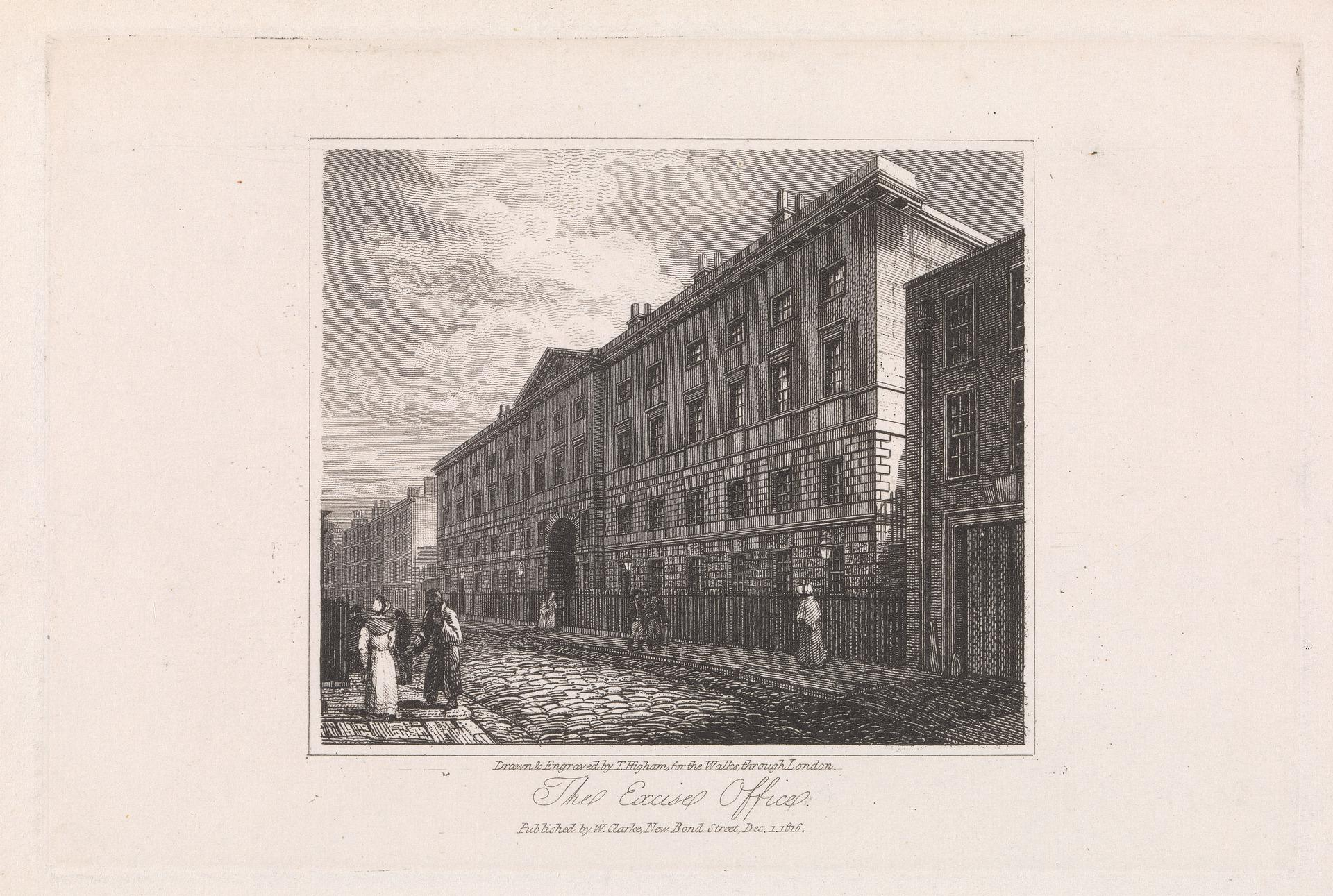
The Excise Office, Broad Street, London: headquarters of the Excise from 1769 to 1852 (Thomas Higham, 1816).

Initially, in 1643, the Excise Office had a headquarters in Broad Street in the City of London. Thereafter, as it expanded, it leased successively larger properties in and around the City. Having returned to Broad Street in the 1670s, the Excise moved out again in the early 1700s, only to move back (into a new purpose-built headquarters there) in 1769.

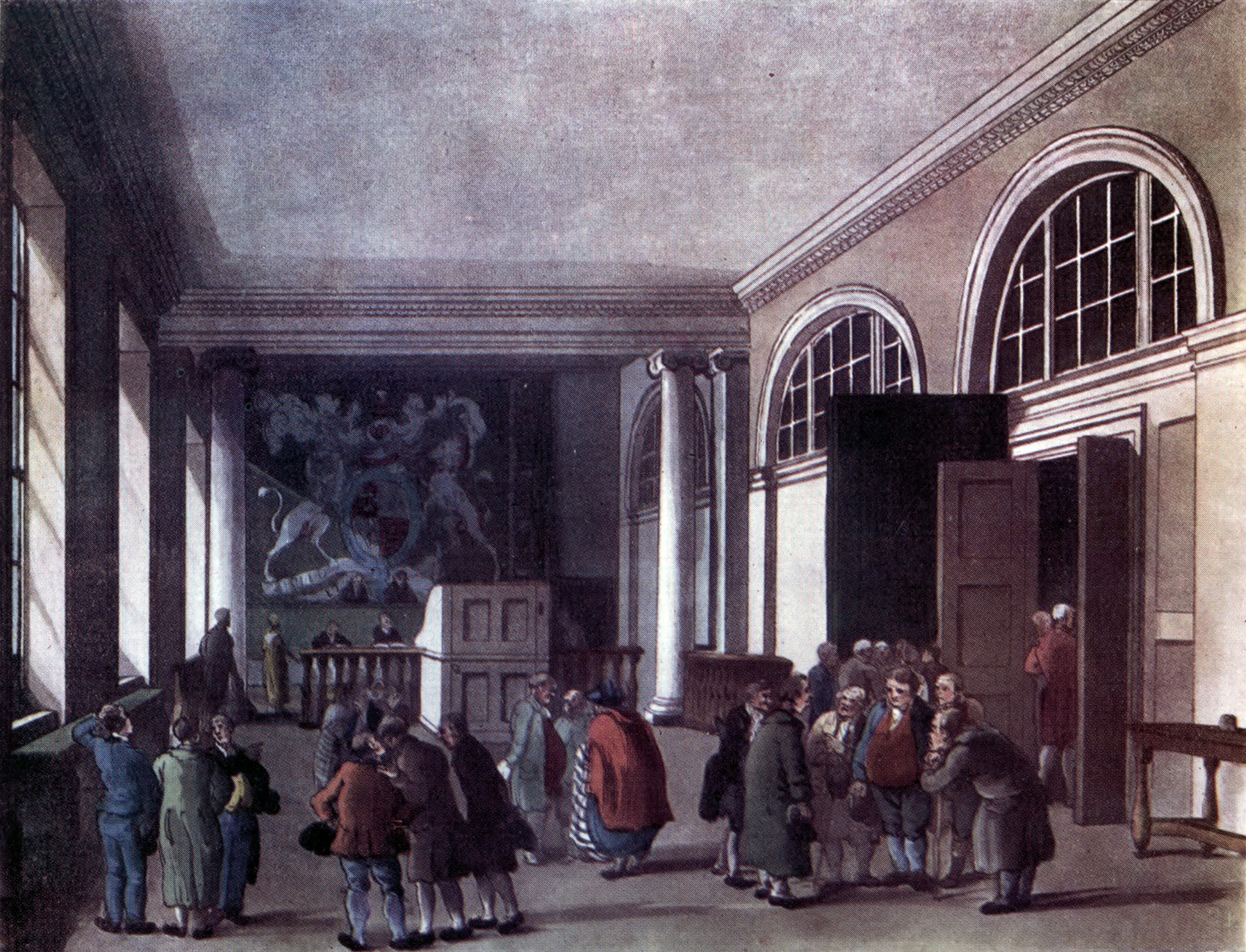
Interior of the Excise Office in Broad Street (Thomas Rowlandson, 1810).

This new Excise Office in Broad Street was designed by George Dance the Elder and built on the site of Gresham College: it consisted of two ranges, one of stone, the other of brick, with a spacious courtyard laid out between them. The Excise remained there until 1852, when its staff moved to join the other departments of the newly-formed Inland Revenue in Somerset House.

== History ==
=== 17th century ===
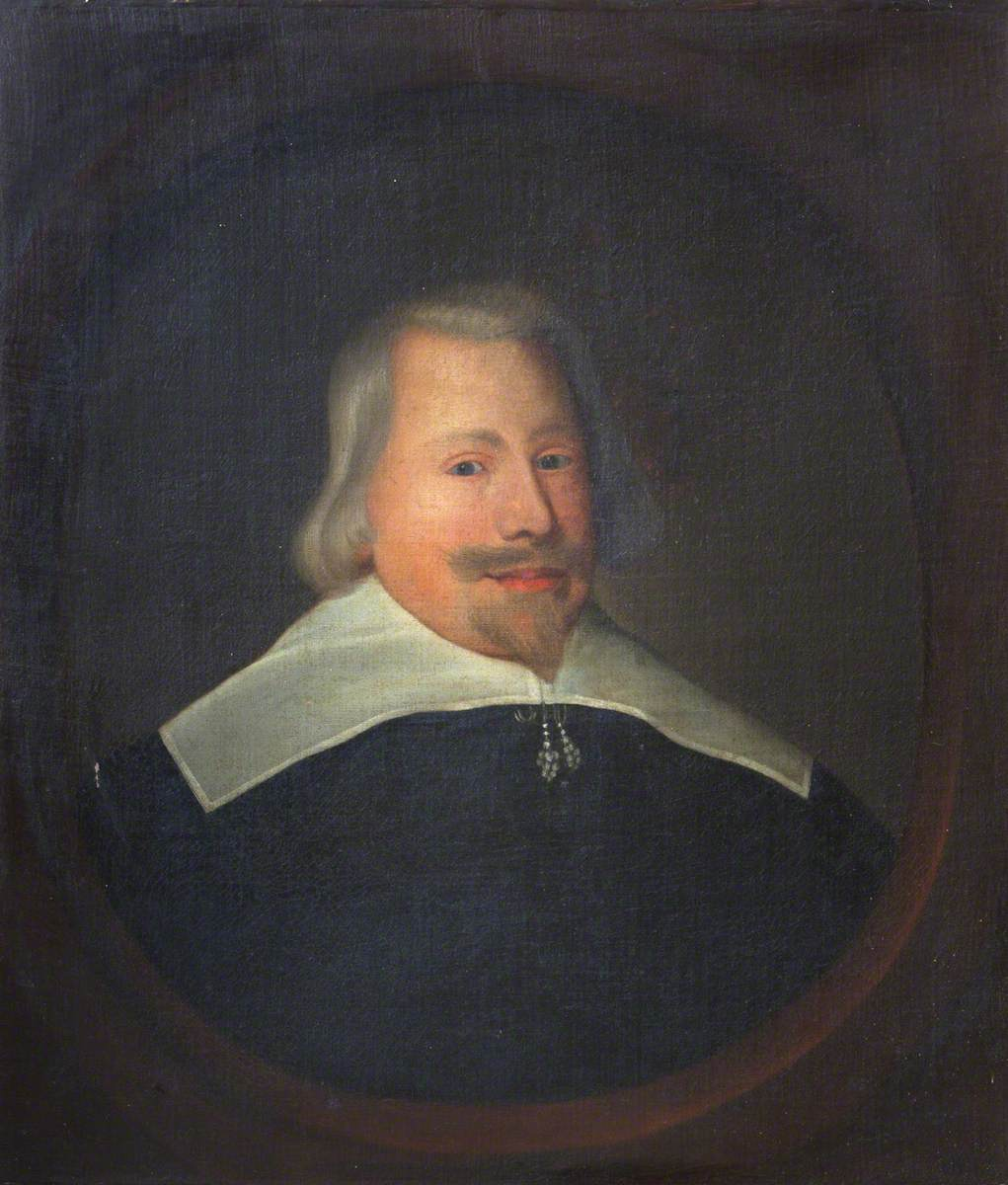
Parliamentarian John Pym, whom Blackstone calls the father of the Excise.

On 22 July 1643, the Long Parliament passed the 'Excise Ordinance' (an Ordinance for the speedy raising and levying of moneys by way of charge or impost upon several commodities) to raise money for the maintenance of Parliamentary forces. The ordinance established a board of eight commissioners to oversee the collection of this revenue. Duty was initially levied on beer, cider, spirits and soap, but the list of dutiable items grew year by year and before long excise duty was being levied on such day-to-day necessities as meat, fish, clothes and leather, prompting public resentment. (In 1647 the Excise office in Smithfield was burned to the ground during a riot against the excise duty on meat.)

After the Restoration the Excise (which had begun as a temporary measure) was retained. The Parliamentarian's excise was initially continued by the Excise Act 1660 and the Excise (No. 2) Act 1660.

Shortly afterwards, the Tenures Abolition Act 1660 (12 Cha. 2. c. 24) levied duties on beer and ale, cider and perry, aqua vitae and the Coffee House beverages of tea, coffee, chocolate and sherbet. The rights to the revenue of excise were granted to the king and his successors in perpetuity (to cover the general expenses of government), in lieu of certain feudal dues and royal hereditary rights which were abolishes by the same act (including tenure in capite, knight-service, purveyance and the Court of Wards and Liveries). At the same time, the Excise (No. 3) Act 1660 authorised the same amounts again, but only for the life of the king, meaning 50% of the amount charged was temporary, and 50% was permanent.

This meant that the excise revenue received was divided in two: the 'Hereditary Excise' was granted to the monarch and his heirs in perpetuity, the 'Temporary Excise' was granted for life, a division which remained in place until the establishment of the Civil List in 1760, since when monarchs have customarily ceded the Hereditary Excise and other hereditary revenues to Parliament at the time of their accession).

From 1662 excise revenue was farmed on and off (i.e. leased to speculators in return for an annual rent) until a Board of Commissioners of Excise was established on a permanent footing in 1683. In addition to excise revenue, the board and its officers were required to collect hearth money until the latter was abolished in 1689.

Following the Glorious Revolution of 1688, with the English Army expanding and fighting multiple campaigns, levels of duty were increased and new duties were raised: beer duty was doubled and over the next twenty-five years such diverse commodities as salt, glass, malt, candles, hops, leather, windows, wire, soap, paper and starch all became subject to excise duty. The distribution of Excise officers around the country meant that they were sometimes called upon to act for other branches of government; for example in 1693 they were called upon to provide annual statistics on inns and taverns to the Secretary at War (for the billeting of soldiers and the stabling of horses).

=== 18th century ===
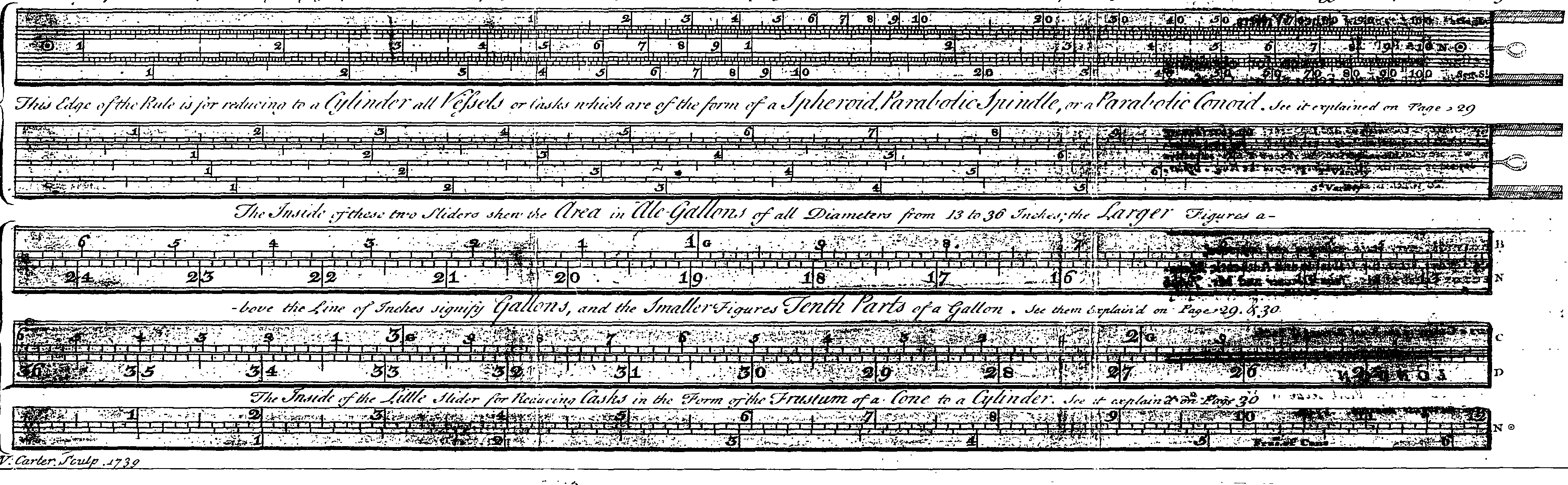
Slide rule scales from The royal gauger; or, gauging made perfectly easy, as it is actually practised by the officers of His Majesty's revenue of excise (compiled by Charles Leadbetter, 1750).

After the Act of Union 1707 a separate Excise Board was established for Scotland by letters patent. When malt duty was imposed there in 1725 it caused widespread outcry and opposition.

The Excise was now seen as an efficient and effective means of raising revenue and Robert Walpole (as Chancellor of the Exchequer and de facto Prime Minister) sought to make the most of it. Seven years later he began to explore the possibility of using the Excise to counter problems of fraud and smuggling related to imported goods – particularly wine and tobacco – within the remit of HM Customs. When he presented his proposals to Parliament in 1733 it prompted a full-blown 'Excise Crisis': there was public frenzy, fuelled by fears that the bill marked the first stage of a General Excise being imposed on all manner of domestic goods and other articles. When the bill was withdrawn there were widespread celebrations.

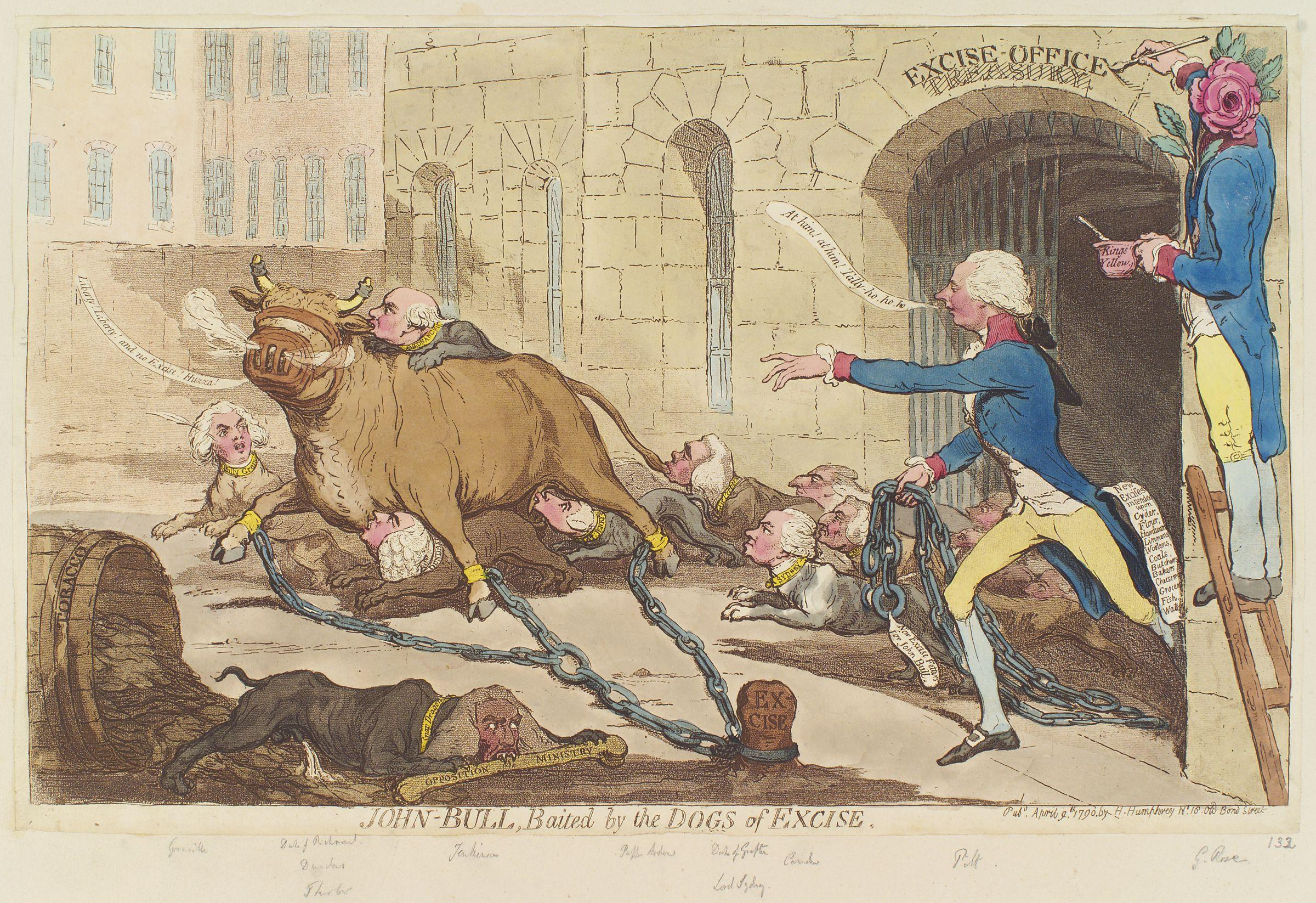
A 1790 Gillray cartoon: John-Bull, baited by the dogs of excise, depicting William Pitt urging on a pack of parliamentary hounds from the Excise Office.

In the wake of the crisis no new excise duties were introduced for the next fifty years (except for a relatively short-lived duty on household plate). When, however, William Pitt the Younger arrived as Prime Minister, he brought with him a determination to raise revenue more effectively by way of the Excise service. A duty on bricks was introduced in 1784, as was the duty on excise licences. Then, in 1786, Pitt revisited the proposals embodied in Walpole's withdrawn Excise Bill of 1733: the intention had been to reduce customs duty on imported wine and tobacco to a nominal amount and instead impose an excise duty; on arrival, the goods would be placed directly in a bonded warehouse where they would remain under Excise control. Despite opposition from affected merchants and retailers, the bill was passed. The gamble paid off and within a few years the duty on tobacco had established itself as Britain's most productive form of revenue (and it remained so until 1968). Thereafter, the developing war with France had prompted the introduction of new forms of duty and further increases.

In due course, the warehousing system proved advantageous to the traders since duty was only payable on the removal of goods from the warehouse. This enabled them to delay paying duty until the goods were sold (whereas previously Customs duty had to be paid the moment the goods arrived on dry land). The Warehousing of Goods Act 1803 (43 Geo. 3. c. 132) was passed allowing the warehousing of all types of goods liable to Excise duty, and new warehouses were built in ports all round the country.

The Resolution, an Excise Cutter (wearing the ensign and pennant of the Excise Board) in 1794.

Smuggling remained a problem with which both Excise and Customs officers were now having to engage. As part of their response, both services were provided with revenue cutters (sea-going vessels to help them patrol the nation's coastal waters). The Excise Board had a fleet of seven cutters in operation by 1784; HM Customs had twenty vessels of its own and two dozen more under contract.

=== 19th century ===
In 1823 the two separate boards of commissioners, for Great Britain, and for Ireland, were consolidated into a single UK-wide Board of Excise by the Customs and Excise Act 1823 (4 Geo. 4. c. 23).

During and after the Napoleonic Wars, the number and level of excise duties had continued to grow. From the 1820s, however, this trend began to be reversed; by 1840 the number of duties levied had reduced from twenty-seven to ten. (Note: Namely: auctions, bricks, glass, hops, licences, malt, paper, soap, spirits and vinegar.) Salt duty (levied since 1698) was repealed first, in 1825, followed by the long-standing excise duties on beer and cider (levied since 1643). Also in 1825 the somewhat anomalous situation whereby import duties (on coffee, cocoa, tobacco, wine and spirits) were collected by the Excise Office came to an end, with responsibility for these being handed back to HM Customs. (The Excise fleet of revenue cruisers were transferred over at the same time.)

In 1830, Sir Henry Parnell published an influential treatise On Financial Reform, which argued for the repeal of duties on the raw materials for building and manufacturing (including those on bricks, tiles, leather and hemp) in order to encourage manufacturing, the repeal of duties on items otherwise involved in manufacturing processes (including those on coal, glass, candles and soap) and the reduction of excise duty on wine and tobacco (in order to discourage smuggling); in order to counterbalance these proposed reductions Parnell argued for the (re-)introduction of taxes on property and on income (i.e. direct, rather than indirect, taxes).

The following year the duties on leather and on printed cotton were repealed, followed by that on candles. (The abolition of the latter was widely welcomed: chandlers' equipment was required to be kept secure behind a Crown lock outside working hours, the key to which was held by the local excise officer, who was obliged during working hours to monitor the chandlers' work every four hours.) Where excise duties remained in place (e.g. on spirits, malt, soap and paper) the requirement for officers to monitor the manufacturing process was reduced.

==== Amalgamations ====
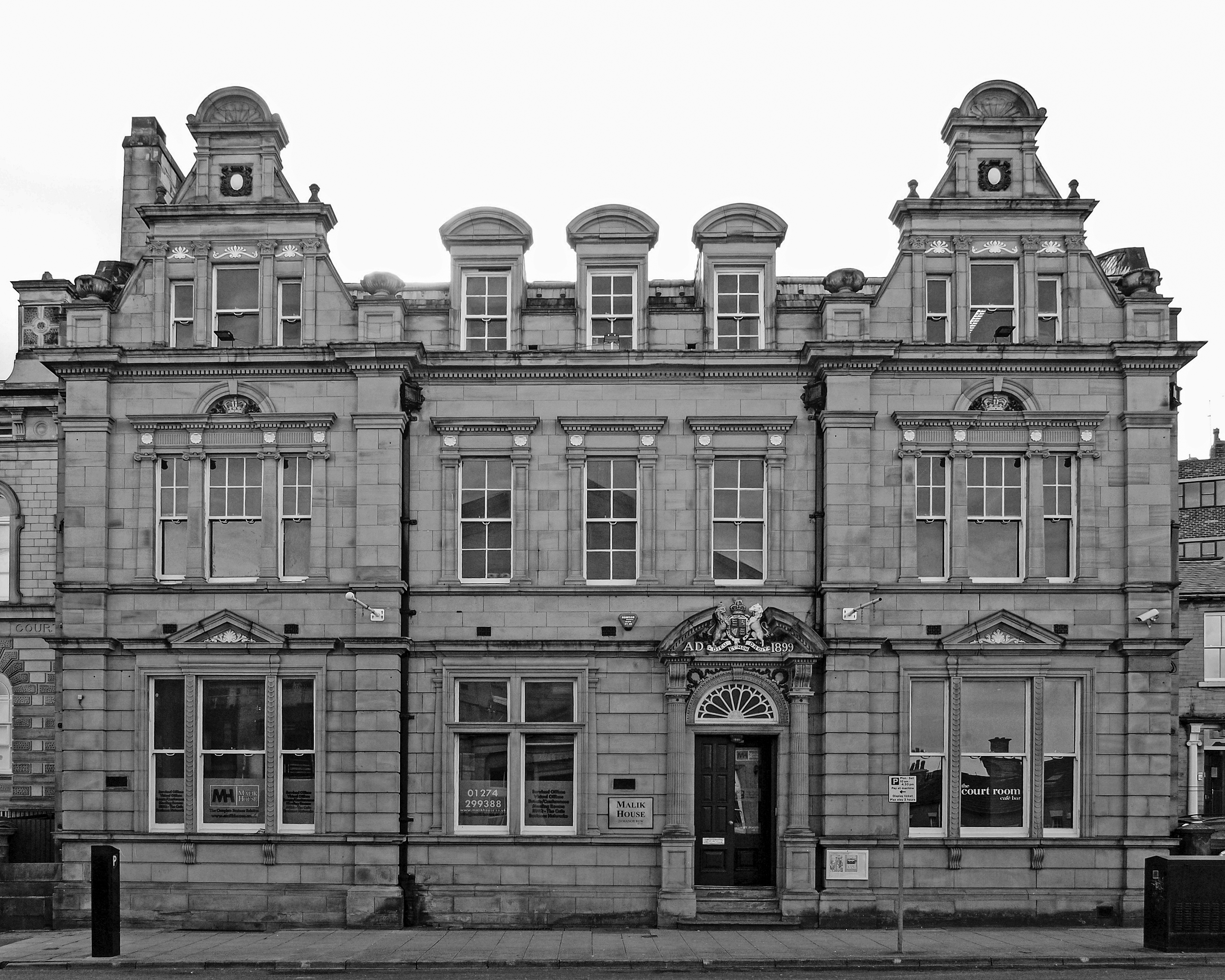
Combined Customs, Excise and Stamp Office in Bradford, dating from 1899.

During the 1840s the Excise Office contracted as further duties were repealed (e.g. that on glass in 1845). Before long, plans were being drawn up to merge the much-reduced department with the Board of Stamps and Taxes (itself formed from a recent amalgamation). The merger was achieved after Parliament passed the Inland Revenue Board Act 1849 (12 & 13 Vict. c. 1) in January 1849.

The reduction in excise duties continued post-amalgamation, with duties being repealed on bricks (1850), soap (1853) and paper (1861). In 1880 malt duty (which had been in place since 1697) followed suit; but it was replaced by a new excise duty on beer (which varied depending on the specific gravity of the product). In addition, the excise staff inherited responsibilities from other departments of the Revenue, such as railway passenger duty and 'establishment licences' (formerly 'assessed taxes') by which duty was payable on such luxuries as carriages, menservants and the display of armorial bearings.

In the early 20th century a decision was taken to unite the two boards responsible for indirect taxation; the Board of Customs and Excise was formed by the Revenue Act 1909 (9 Edw. 7. c. 43), leaving the Inland Revenue to administer direct taxes (principally income tax, which had been re-introduced in 1842).

== List of excise duties (1643-1909) ==
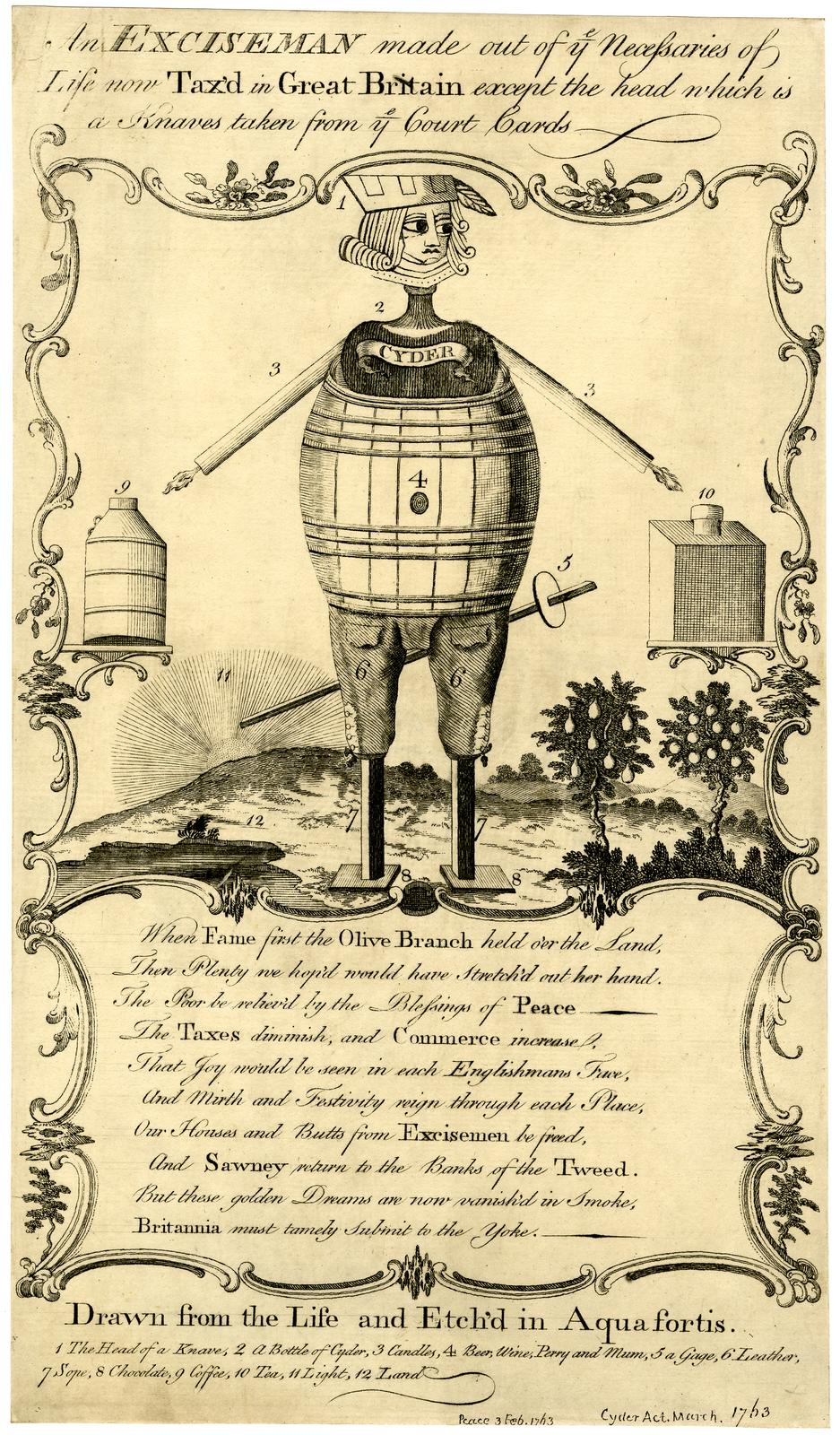
"An Exciseman made out of the Necessaries of Life now Tax'd in Great Britain..." a satirical cartoon of 1765.

The following duties were levied by the Excise Office and by the Excise Department of the Inland Revenue (this is not an exhaustive list):

- Beer (1643-1830, 1880-)
- Cider (1643-1830, 1916-23, 1976-)
- Salt (1643-1660, 1694-1825); (Note: Excise and customs duties on salt were administered by a separate Salt Office from 1702.)
- Soap (1643-60, 1712-1853)
- Vinegar (1643-1844)
- Spirits (1660-)
- Tea (1660-1834)
- Glass (1695-1845)
- Made-wine (Note: Made-wine is, by the current HMRC definition, "any other drink [than wine] that has alcohol made by fermentation (apart from cider), not by distillation or any other process. For example, mead is a made-wine". It was historically also known as 'sweet'.) (1696-1834)
- Malt (1697-1880)
- Candles (1710-1832)
- Hops (1711-1862)
- Leather (1711-1831)
- Paper (1712-1861)
- Wire (1712-1826)
- Starch (1713-1834)
- Bricks (1750-1850)
- Tiles (1750-1839)
- Plate (1756-77)
- Cotton prints (1774-1831)
- Auctions (1777-1845)
- Wine (1786-1825)
- Licences (1784-) see below
- Railway passengers (1847-1929); had previously been subject to stamp duty (since 1832)
- Sugar (1837-74, 1915-62)
- Racehorses (1856-1874); previously an assessed tax (since 1784)
- Chicory (1860-1926)
- Saccharin (1901-62)

=== List of excise licence duties ===
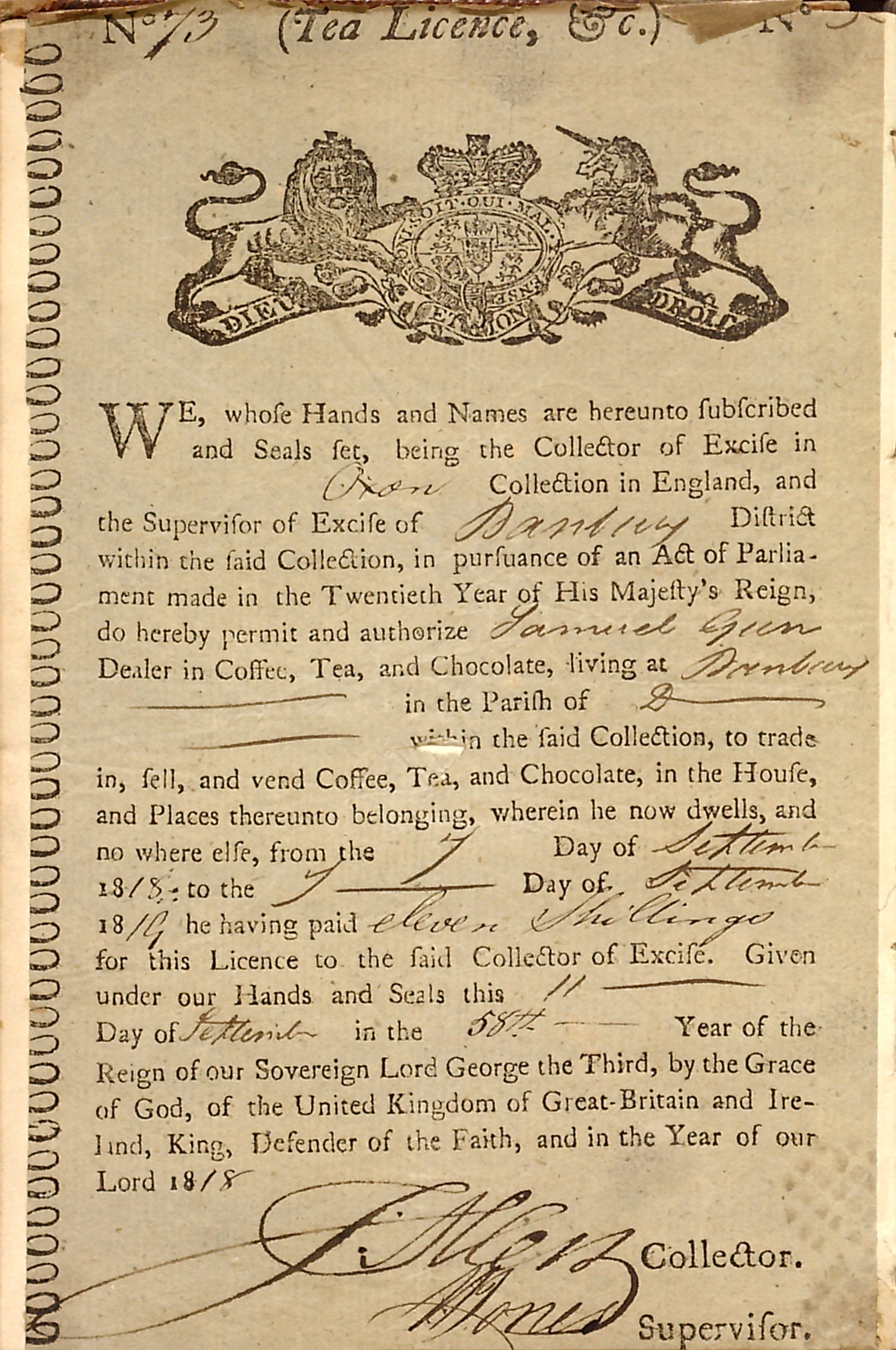
A licence permitting Samuel Gun to trade in, sell and vend coffee, tea and chocolate; signed by the Collector of Excise in Oxfordshire Collection and the Supervisor of Excise of Banbury District, 11 September 1818.

From 1784 an excise duty was payable on licences taken out by manufacturers and traders of dutiable goods, including brewers, maltsters, distillers, glassmakers, paper manufacturers, soap-makers, publicans, vintners (and other dealers or retailers of alcoholic beverages), tobacco and snuff dealers and retailers, and traders in coffee, tea, cocoa-nuts, chocolate and pepper. Licence duty often remained payable even if duty on the product itself had been repealed.

In addition, licence duty was payable by or for (among others):

- Appraisers (1865-1949); previously subject to stamp duty (since 1806)
- Armorial bearings (1869-1945); previously an assessed tax (since 1798)
- Auctioneers (1777-1949)
- Carriages (1869-); previously an assessed tax (since 1747)
- Dogs (1867-1988); previously an assessed tax (since 1796)
- Guns (1870-)
- Game (1860-2007); previously an assessed tax (since 1784)
- Hackney carriages (1847-) (Note: Hackney carriages had first been licensed by the Commissioners for the Streets and Wayes (in 1664), then by the Hackney Coach Office (from 1694-1831) and then by the Stamp Office (from 1831).)
- Hawkers (1864-1966) (Note: Hawkers, pedlars and petty chapmen had first been licensed in 1697, the Hawkers and Pedlars Office being established the following year. Its work passed to the Hackney Carriage Office in 1810 and thence to the Stamp Office in 1832.)
- House agents (1865-1949); previously subject to stamp duty (since 1861)
- Male servants (1869-1938); previously an assessed tax (since 1777)
- Sellers of Patent Medicine (1865-1941); previously subject to stamp duty
- Pawnbrokers (1864–1974); previously subject to stamp duty (since 1785)
- Plate-dealers (1865-1949); previously subject to stamp duty (since 1758)
- Playing card makers and sellers (1864-1960); playing cards had previously been subject to stamp duty (since 1711)
- Post horses (1837-1869); previously subject to stamp duty (since 1779)
- Saddle and carriage horses (1869-1875); previously an assessed tax (since 1784)
- Motor vehicles (1888-)
