= William Twaddell =

William Twaddell could refer to:

- William J. Twaddell (1884–1922), assassinated Irish politician
- William Freeman Twaddell (1906–1982), American linguist
- William H. Twaddell, American diplomat
- William Twaddell, the inventor of the Twaddell scale
