= Alcohol proof =

Measure of alcohol content

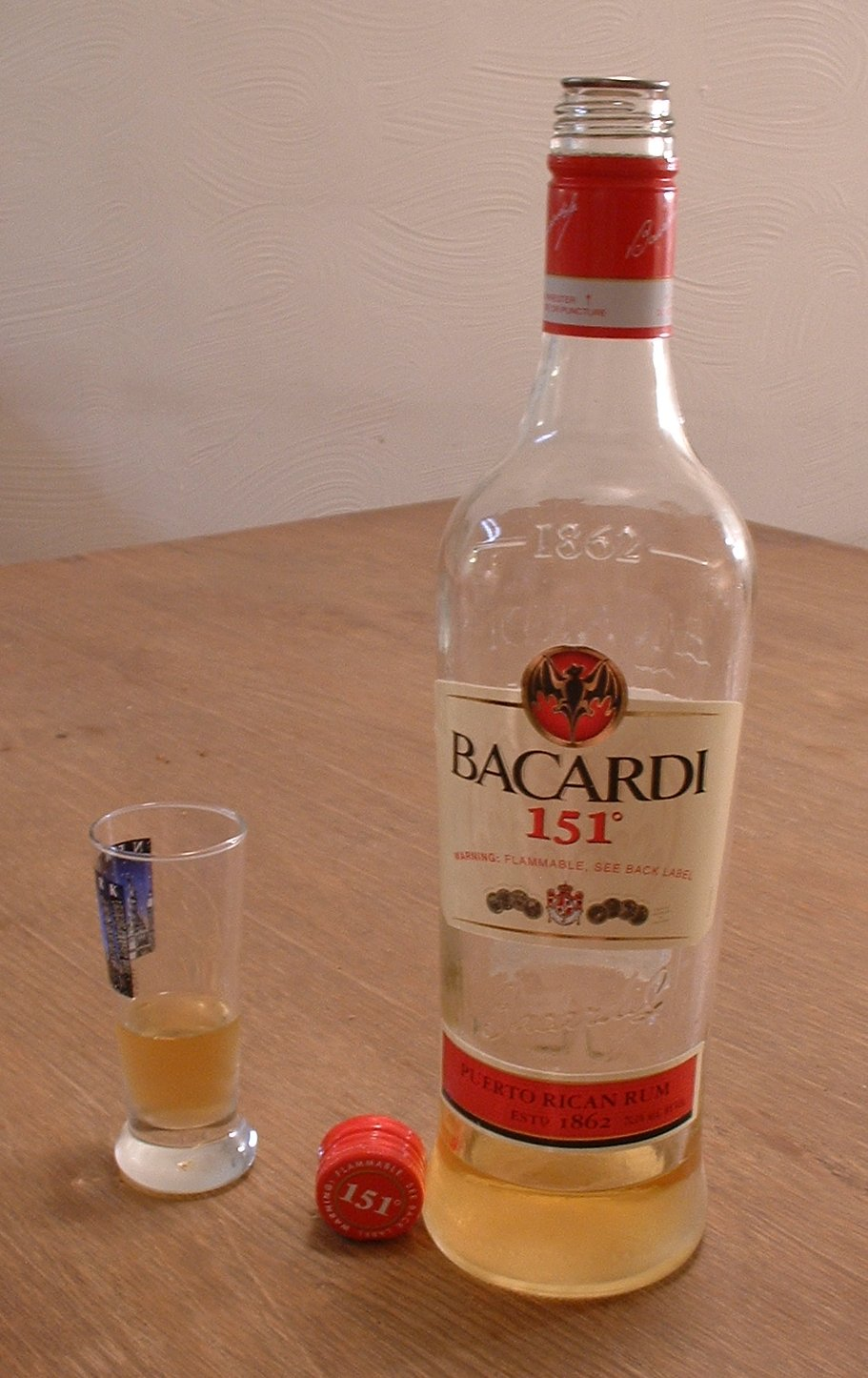
A bottle of 151 proof ("over-proof") rum, measured by the US system, with an ABV of 75.5%

Alcohol proof (usually termed simply "proof" in relation to a beverage) is a measure of the content of ethanol (alcohol) in an alcoholic beverage. The term was originally used in England, and from 1816 was equal to about 1.75 times the percentage of alcohol by volume (ABV). The United Kingdom changed to use ABV instead of proof. The definition of proof in terms of ABV varies from country to country; for example, in the United States, alcohol proof is defined as twice the percentage of ABV.

The measurement of alcohol content and the statement of content on bottles of alcoholic beverages is regulated by law in many countries. In 1972, Canada phased out the use of "proof"; in 1973, the European Union followed suit; and the United Kingdom, where the concept originated, started using ABV instead in 1980. The United States Code mandates the use of ABV, but permits proof to be used also.

The degree symbol (°) is sometimes used to indicate alcohol proof, either alone (e.g. 10°) or after a space and joined to the letter P as a unit name (e.g. 13 °P). (Note: Not to be confused with degrees Plato sign (°P) on the Plato scale used in beer measurement.)

== History ==
The term proof in relation to alcohol content dates back to 16th-century England, when spirits were taxed at different rates depending on their alcohol content. Similar terminology and methodology spread to other nations as spirit distillation, and taxation, became common. In England, spirits were originally tested with a basic "burn-or-no-burn" test, in which an alcohol-containing liquid that would ignite was said to be "above proof", and one which would not was said to be "under proof". A liquid just alcoholic enough to maintain combustion was defined as 100 proof and was the basis for taxation. Because the flash point of alcohol is highly dependent on temperature, 100 proof defined this way ranges from 20% at 36 °C (97 °F) to 96% at 13 °C (55 °F) alcohol by weight (ABW); at 24 °C (75 °F) 100 proof would be 50% ABW.

Another early method for testing liquor's alcohol content was the "gunpowder method". Gunpowder was soaked in a spirit, and if the gunpowder could still burn, the spirit was rated above proof. This test relies on the fact that potassium nitrate (a chemical in gunpowder) is significantly more soluble in water than in alcohol. While less influenced by temperature than the simpler burn-or-no-burn test, gunpowder tests also lacked true reproducibility. Factors including the grain size of gunpowder and the time it sat in the spirit impact the dissolution of potassium nitrate and therefore what would be defined as 100 proof. However, the gunpowder method is significantly less variable than the burn-or-no-burn method, and 100 proof defined by it is traditionally defined as 57.15% ABV.

By the end of the 17th century, England had introduced tests based on specific gravity for defining proof. However, it was not until 1816 that a legal standard based on specific density was defined in England. 100 proof was defined as a spirit with 12/13 the specific gravity of pure water at the same temperature. From the 19th century until 1 January 1980, the UK officially measured alcohol content by proof spirit, defined as spirit with a gravity of 12/13 that of water, or 923 kg/m^{3} (1,556 lb/cu yd), and equivalent to 57.15% ABV.

The value 57.15% is very close to the fraction 4/7 ≈ 0.5714. This led to the approximation that 100-proof spirit has an ABV of 4/7. From this, it follows that to convert the ABV expressed as a percentage to degrees proof, it is only necessary to multiply the ABV by 7/4. Thus pure 100% alcohol will have 100×(7/4) = 175 proof, and a spirit containing 40% ABV will have 40×(7/4) = 70 proof.

The proof system in the United States was established around 1848 and was based on percent alcohol rather than specific gravity. Fifty percent alcohol by volume was defined as 100 proof. This is different from 50% volume fraction (expressed as a percentage); the latter does not take into account change in volume on mixing, whereas the former does. To make 50% ABV from pure alcohol, one would take 50 parts of alcohol and dilute to 100 parts of solution with water, all the while mixing the solution. To make 50% alcohol by volume fraction, one would take 50 parts alcohol and 50 parts water, measured separately, and then mix them together. The resulting volume will not be 100 parts but between 96 and 97 parts, since the smaller water molecules can take up some of the space between the larger alcohol molecules (see volume change).

The use of proof as a measure of alcohol content is now mostly linguistic and historical. Today, liquor is sold in most locations with labels that state its percentage alcohol by volume.

== Governmental regulation ==
=== European Union ===
The European Union (EU) follows recommendations of the International Organization of Legal Metrology (OIML). OIML's International Recommendation No. 22 (1973) provides standards for measuring alcohol strength by volume and by mass. A preference for one method over the other is not stated in the document, but if alcohol strength by volume is used, it must be expressed as a percentage of total volume at a temperature of 20 °C (68 °F). The document does not address alcohol proof or the labeling of bottles.

=== United Kingdom ===
On 1 January 1980, Britain adopted the ABV system of measurement prescribed by the European Economic Community (the predecessor of the EU), of which it was then a member. The OIML recommendation for ABV used by the EU states the alcohol by volume in a mixture containing alcohol as a percentage of the total volume of the mixture at a temperature of 293.15 K [20.00 °C; 68.00 °F]. It replaced the Sikes hydrometer method of measuring the proof of spirits, which had been used in Britain for over 160 years.

=== United States ===
In the United States, alcohol content is legally mandated to be specified as an ABV percentage. For bottled spirits over 100 ml (3.5 imp fl oz; 3.4 US fl oz) containing no solids, actual alcohol content is allowed to vary by up to 0.15% of the ABV stated on the label. By contrast, bottled spirits which are less than 100 ml (as well as those which otherwise contain solids) may vary by up to 0.25%. Proof (the term degrees proof is not used), defined as being twice the percentage of alcohol by volume, may be optionally stated in conjunction with the ABV. For example, whisky may be labeled as 50% ABV and as 100 proof; 86-proof whisky contains 43% ABV. The most typical bottling proof for spirits in the United States is 80 US proof, and there is special legal recognition of 100-proof spirits in the bottled in bond category defined since 1897.

The Code of Federal Regulations requires that liquor labels state the percentage of ABV at a temperature of 60 °F (16 °C). The regulation permits, but does not require, a statement of the proof, provided that it is printed close to the ABV number. In practice, proof levels continue to be stated on nearly all spirits labels in the United States, and are more commonly used than ABV when describing spirits in journalism and informal settings.

=== Canada ===
Beverages were labelled by alcohol proof in Canada until 1972, then replaced by ABV.

== See also ==
- Liquor
- Cask strength
- Volume percent
