= List of fellows of the Royal Society elected in 1724 =

This is a list of fellows of the Royal Society elected in 1724.

== Fellows ==
- John Byrom (1692–1763), philosopher and poet, inventor of a shorthand
- Stephen Chase, gentleman
- Nicolaus Cruquius (1678–1754), Dutch surveyor
- Joseph Danvers (1686–1753), MP
- Joannes Jacobus Dillenius (1684–1747), physician and botanist
- John Diodate (1690–1727)
- John Dobyns (died 1731), surgeon
- John Eames (1686–1744), dissenting tutor
- Anthony Ellys (1690–1751), Bishop of St Davids
- Daniel Gabriel Fahrenheit (1686–1736), Dutch-German-Polish physicist, engineer and glass blower
- Joannes Adolphus Jacobaeus (1698–1772), Danish Professor of Medicine
- John Kendall (died 1735), barrister
- Ralph Leicester (c.1699–1777)
- Charles Lennox, 2nd Duke of Richmond, Lennox and Aubigny (1701–1750)
- Smart Lethieullier (1701–1760), antiquary
- Joseph-Nicolas de Lisle (1688–1768), French astronomer and cartographer
- John Meres (died 1726), apothecary. Clerk to Society of Apothecaries
- Robert Ord (1700–1778), MP. Chief Baron of the Scottish Exchequer
- Littleton Powys (1647?– 1732), barrister. Justice of the King's Bench
- John Ranby (1703–1773), surgeon
- John Gaspar Scheuchzer (1702–1729), Swiss naturalist, physician and writer
- Francis Scott, 2nd Duke of Buccleuch (1695–1751)
- Edward Vernon (c. 1695–1761), clergyman and antiquarian
