= Antoine Baumé =

French chemist (1728–1804)

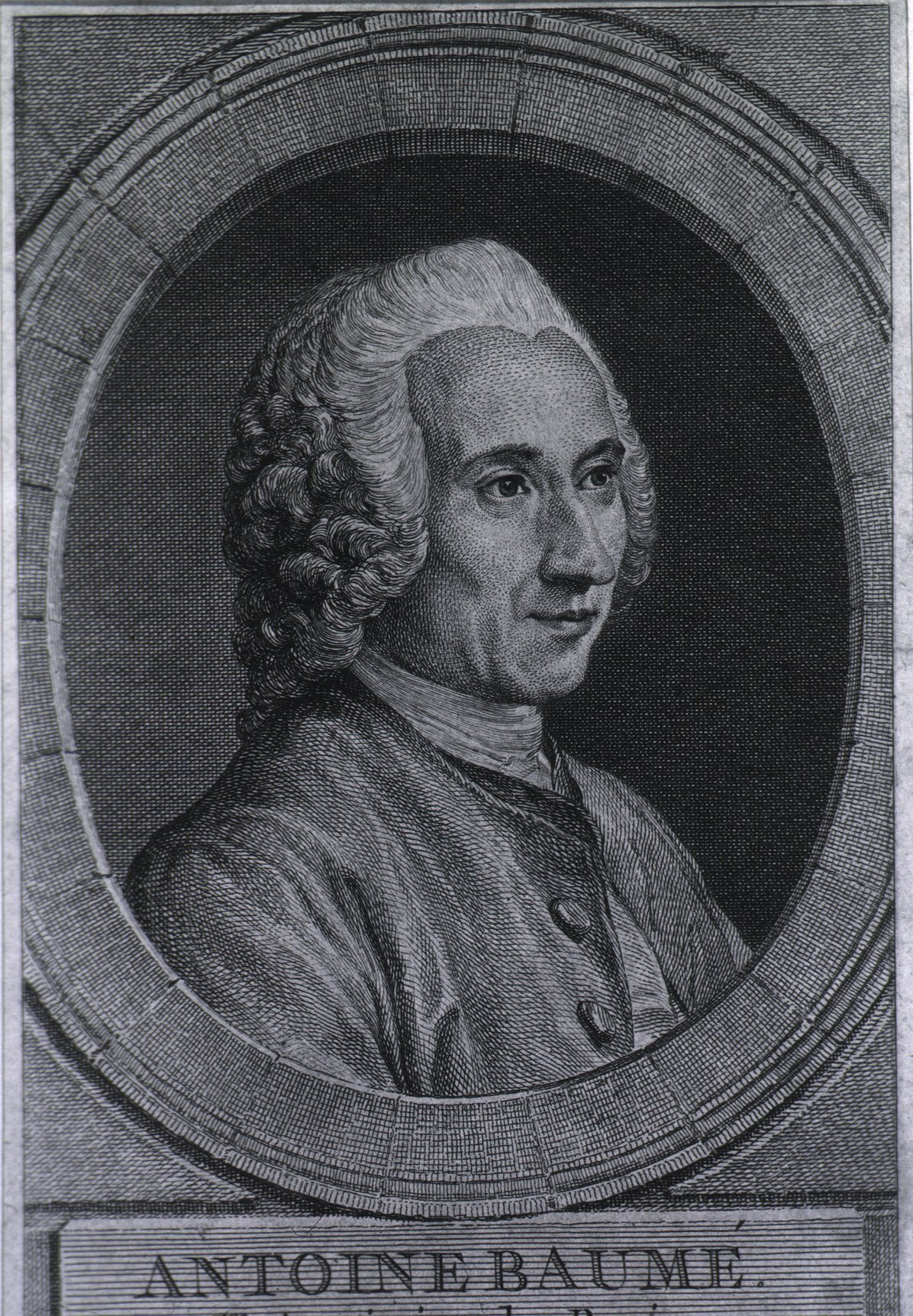
- Antoine Baumé
- Born: 26 February 1728; Senlis France
- Died: 15 October 1804 (aged 76); Paris France
- Known for: Baumé scale

Antoine Baumé (26 February 1728 – 15 October 1804) was a French chemist.

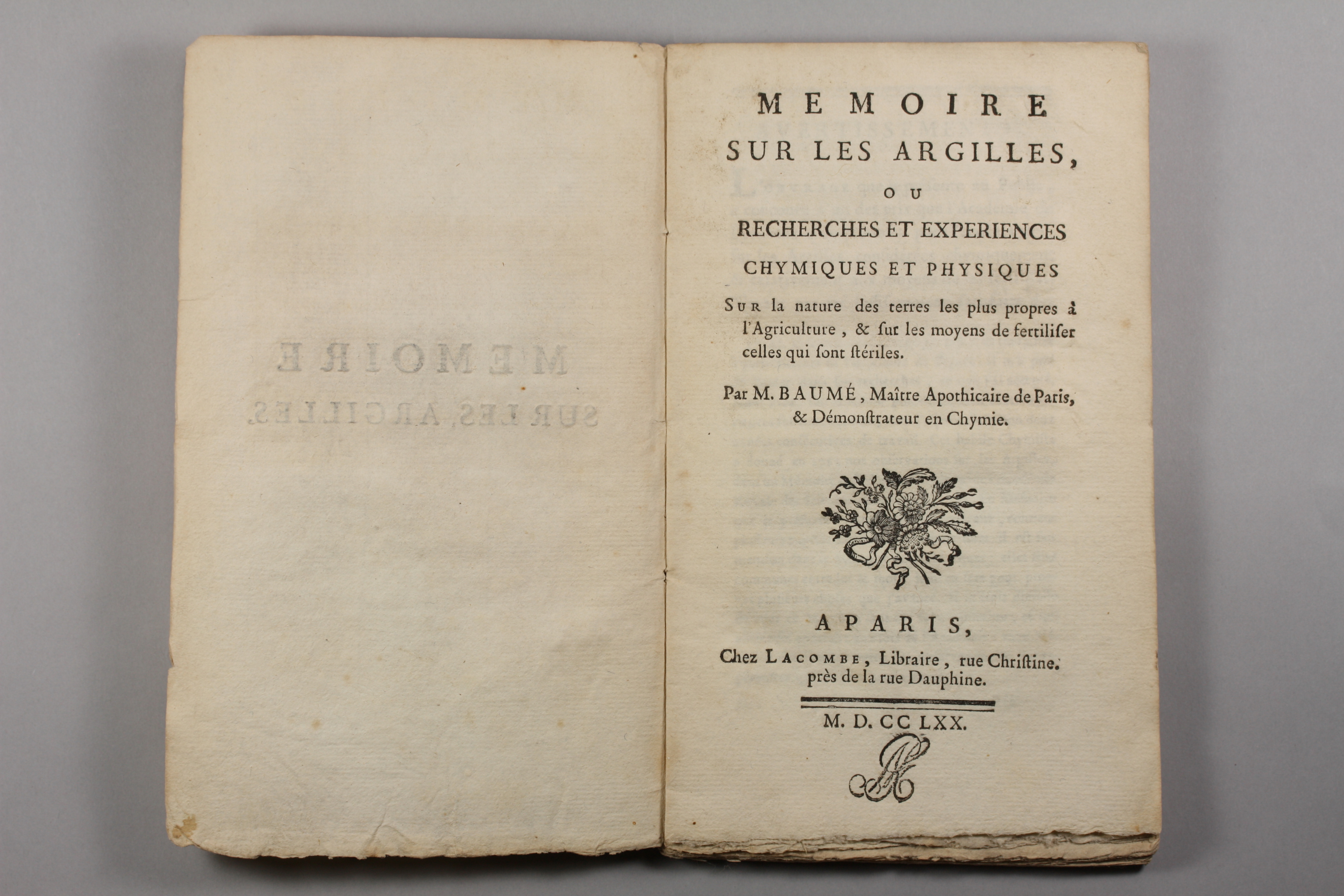
Memoire sur les argilles, on agricultural chemistry, 1770

== Life ==
He was born at Senlis. He was apprenticed to the chemist Claude Joseph Geoffroy, and in 1752 was admitted a member of the École de Pharmacie, where in the same year he was appointed professor of chemistry. The money he made in a business he carried on in Paris for dealing in chemical products enabled him to retire in 1780 in order to devote himself to applied chemistry, but, ruined in the Revolution, he was obliged to return to a commercial career.

He devised many improvements in technical processes, e.g. for bleaching silk, dyeing, gilding, purifying saltpetre, etc., but he is best known as the inventor of the Baumé scale hydrometer or "spindle" which provides scientific measurements for the density of liquids. The scale remains associated with his name but is often incorrectly spelt "Beaumé".

Of the numerous books and papers he wrote the most important is his Éléments de pharmacie théorique et pratique (9 editions, 1762–1818). He became a member of the Academy of Sciences in 1772, and an associate of the Institute in 1796. He died in Paris on 15 October 1804.

== Works ==
- Baumé, Antoine (1757). Jean-Thomas Hérissant (ed.). Dissertation sur l'æther: dans laquelle on examine les différens produits du mêlange de l'esprit de vin avec les acides minéraux (in French). p. 332.
- Eléments de Pharmacie théorique et pratique . Samson, Paris Nouvelle Ed. 1770 Digital edition / 3rd ed. 1773 Digital edition / 4th ed. 1777 Digital edition / 5th ed. 1784 Digital edition by the University and State Library Düsseldorf (9 editions, from 1762 to 1818)
  - Baumé, Antoine (1795). C.N. Guillon-d'Assas (ed.). Éléments de pharmacie théorique et pratique (in French). p. 835.
- Manuel de chymie ou exposé des opérations de la chymie et de leurs produits, 1763
  - Baumé, Antoine (1766). P. F. Didot le jeune (ed.). Manuel de chymie, ou Exposé des opérations de la chymie et de leurs produits (in French). Vol. 1766. p. 501.
- Erläuterte Experimental-Chimie . Band 2 . Fritsch, Leipzig 1775 Digital edition by the University and State Library Düsseldorf
- Pierre François Didot (le jeune), ed. (1773). Chymie expérimentale et raisonnée (in French). Vol. 1. Paris.
- Pierre François Didot (le jeune), ed. (1773). Chymie expérimentale et raisonnée (in French). Vol. 2. Paris.
- Baumé, Antoine (1773). P. F. Didot le jeune (ed.). Chymie expérimentale et raisonnée (in French). Vol. 3.
- Baumé, Antoine (1778). P. F. Didot le jeune (ed.). Mémoire sur la meilleure manière de construire les alambics et fourneaux (in French). p. 128.
- Mémoires sur les argiles (in French). 1796.
- Baumé, Antoine (1797). Mémoire sur les marrons d'Inde (in French). p. 92.
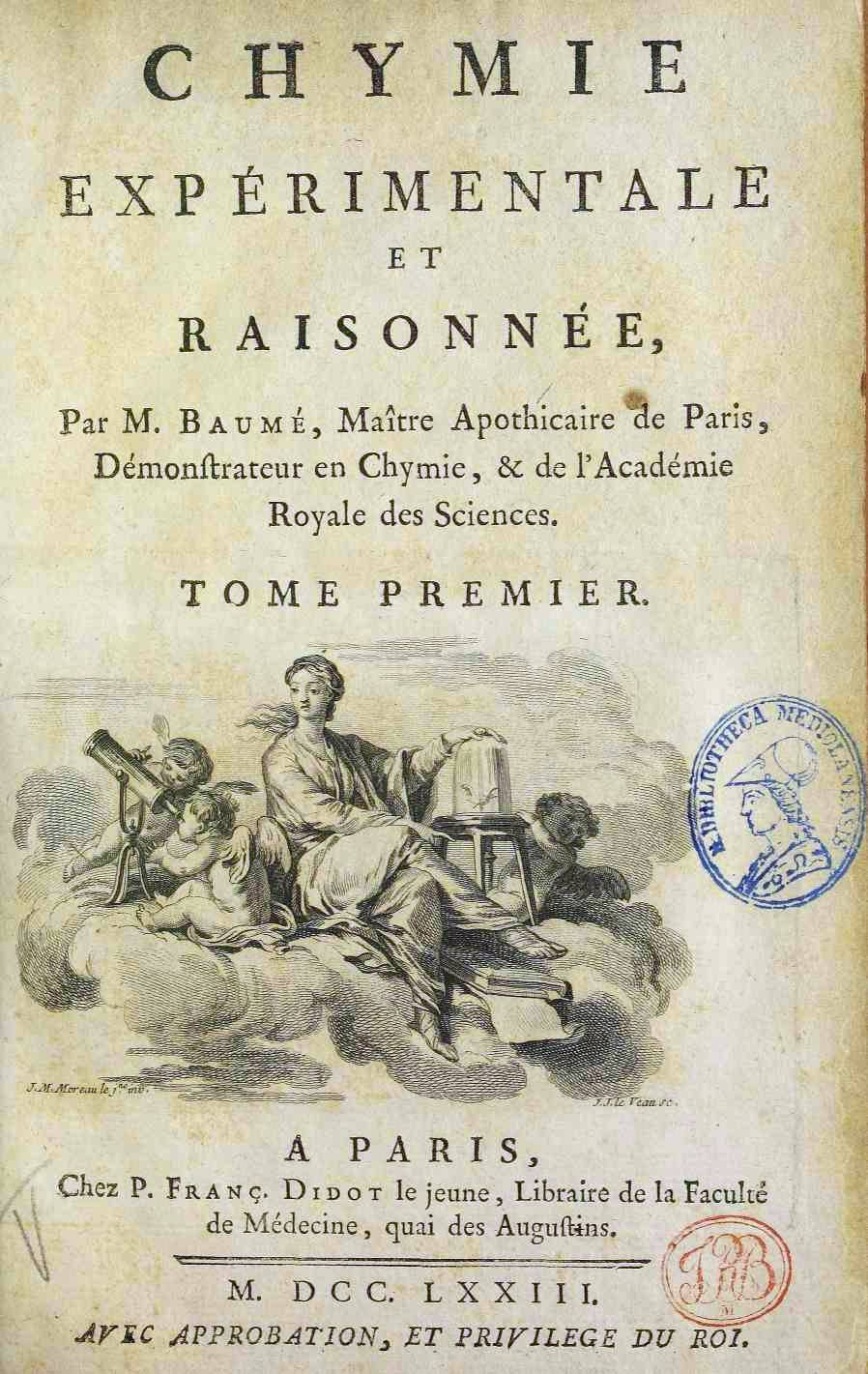
Chymie expérimentale et raisonnée, vol. 1, 1773
