= Mary Dicas =

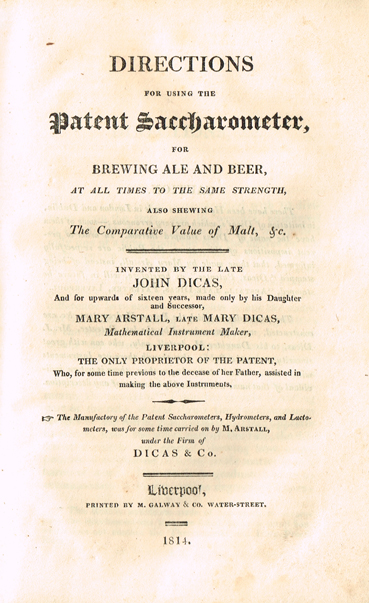
- Parent(s): John Dicas; Alice Edmonton

Mary Dicas became Mary Arstall (fl. 1800–1818) was a scientific instrument maker in Liverpool. Her company created thousands of hydrometers that were exported to America where Dicas & Co enjoyed a monopoly as the agreed instrument for calculating the tax on alcoholic beverages.

== Life ==
The date of Dicas's birth is unclear but her parents Alice Edmonton and John Dicas married on 9 July 1777 in Chester and she was the elder daughter. Her brother, who does not appear to have survived, was baptised in 1787.

By 1800 her father's lucrative business was trading in her name and he died before 1802. Her father had traded alcoholic drink in Liverpool but he was known for his invention of a type of hydrometer which he had patented in 1780. His patent number 1259 specified the use of sliding rules which allowed a look up of the strength of the liquor. His system was recognised by the American government in 1790 as the approved instrument for calculating the tax on American liquor and specified in an act of congress.

In 1802 the UK government held a board of enquiry so that they could decide on the approved way of measuring the alcohol content of drinks. Mary was one of the ten people who presented their instruments. The British excise authorities chose an instrument made by Bartholomew Sikes which meant that her device would not sell in the UK but her company's American monopoly remained. She advertised herself as "the only proprietor of the patent" making saccharometers for measuring syrup, hydrometers for determining liquid density, and lacto-meters for measing the strength of milk. Her hydrometer and lactometer are discussed in an article of the 1911 Encyclopædia Britannica. The article says that the Dicas hydrometer is too complex and the lactometer isn't accurate enough.

Her company made other instruments including a 13½ inch. radius vernier octant.

By 1807 her mathematical instrument company began to partner a business owned by George Arstall and at some point she married him and they had four children. He owned a scale beam company and in time her son went to work there.

Mary's date or place of death is unknown but by 1818 her business was being run by her sister Ann.
