= Elevator paradox (physics) =

Thought experiment in physics

The elevator paradox relates to a hydrometer placed on an "elevator" or vertical conveyor that, by moving to different elevations, changes the atmospheric pressure. In this classic demonstration, the floating hydrometer remains at an equilibrium position. Essentially, a hydrometer measures specific gravity of liquids independent of barometric pressure. This is because the change in air pressure is applied to the entire hydrometer flask. The submerged portion of the flask receives a transmitted force through the liquid, thus no portion of the apparatus receives a net force resulting from a change in air pressure.

The elevator paradox is a contradictory point between the Newtonian theory of gravitation and Einstein’s basic ideas of Relativity. This is a paradox if the buoyancy of the hydrometer is said to depend on the weight of the liquid that it displaces. At a higher barometric pressure, the liquid occupies a slightly smaller volume, and thus more dense might be considered to have a higher specific gravity. However, the hydrometer also displaces air, and the weight of the liquid and the air are affected equally by elevation.

== Cartesian divers ==
A Cartesian diver, on the other hand, has an internal space that, unlike a hydrometer, is not rigid, and thus can change its displacement as increasing external air pressure compresses the air in the diver. If the diver, instead of being placed in the classic plastic bottle, were floated in a flask on an elevator, the diver would respond to a change in air pressure. Similarly, a non-rigid container like a toy balloon will be affected, as will the rib cage of a human SCUBA diver, and such systems will vary in buoyancy. A glass hydrometer is rigid under normal pressure, for all practical purposes.

== The hydrometer in an accelerating frame of reference ==
The upward or downward acceleration of the elevator, as long as the net force is directed downward, will not change the equilibrium point of the hydrometer either. The force due to acceleration acts on the hydrometer exactly as it would on an equal mass of water or other liquid.
