= Bartholomew Sikes =

Sikes' Hydrometer Act 1816
- Act of Parliament
- Parliament of the United Kingdom
- Long title: An Act for establishing the Use of an Hydrometer, called Sikes's Hydrometer, in ascertaining the Strength of Spirits, instead of Clarke's Hydrometer.
- Citation: 56 Geo. 3. c. 140
- Territorial extent: United Kingdom

Dates
- Royal assent: 2 July 1816
- Commencement: 2 July 1816 (Note: The Acts of Parliament (Commencement) Act 1793.)
- Repealed: 23 May 1818
Other legislation
Amends	Fisheries, Continuance of Laws Act 1801; Use of Clarke's Hydrometer Act 1802
Repealed by	Spirits (Strength Ascertainment) Act 1818

Status: Repealed

Text of statute as originally enacted

Bartholomew Sikes (died 1803) was an officer in the employ of HM Excise who in the late 18th century perfected a device by which the alcoholic content of a liquid can be measured.

In 1802 he presented his invention to a board of inquiry together with nine other competitors who included Mary Dicas of Liverpool whose hydrometer was the approved instrument by the American excise. Sikes' device was chosen over the other nine.

The success of the device caused his name to be immortalised in an act of Parliament: Sikes' Hydrometer Act 1816 (56 Geo. 3. c. 140). From 1816 until 1980 the hydrometer was the standard used in the UK to measure the alcohol proof of spirits, and from 1846 in Canadian law.

== Bibliography ==
- Denison, Merrill (1955). The Barley and the Stream: The Molson Story. Toronto: McClelland & Stewart Limited.
