= Fahrenheit hydrometer =

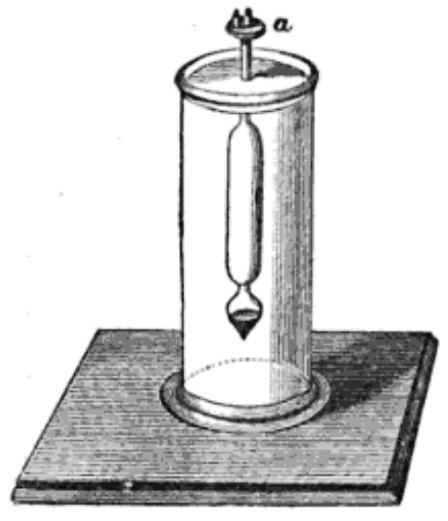
A Fahrenheit hydrometer

The Fahrenheit hydrometer is a device used to measure the density of a liquid. It was invented by Daniel Gabriel Fahrenheit (1686–1736), better known for his work in thermometry. The Nicholson hydrometer, after William Nicholson (1753-1815), is similar in design, but instead of a weighted bulb at the bottom there is a small container ("basket") into which a sample can be placed.

Nicholson's Hydrometer

== Operation ==
The Fahrenheit hydrometer is a constant-volume device that will float in water. In the figure shown here, the hydrometer is floating vertically in a cylinder containing a liquid. At the bottom of the hydrometer is a weighted bulb and at the top is a pan for small weights. To use the hydrometer, one first accurately determines its weight (W) while it is dry. Next, the device is placed in water, and a weight (w) sufficient to sink a marked point on the rod to the water-line is placed on the pan. At that point, the weight of water displaced by the instrument equals W + w. The hydrometer is then removed, wiped dry, and placed in the liquid whose density is to be determined. A weight (x) sufficient to sink the hydrometer to the same marked point is placed in the pan. The density (D) of the second liquid is then given by D = (W + x) / (W + w).

The Fahrenheit hydrometer can be made of either glass or metal.

== See also ==
- Hydrometer
