= Twaddell scale =

Hydrometer scale

The Twaddell scale is a hydrometer scale for reporting the measured specific gravity of a liquid relative to water. On this scale, a specific gravity of 1.000 is reported as 0, and 2.000 reports as 200. Concentrated sulfuric acid with a specific gravity of 1.8 has a Twaddell scale measurement of 160 (as per the linear relationship between readings and sp. gravity). The Twaddell scale is only used for liquids with specific gravity greater than that of water. The scale was used in the British dye and bleach manufacturing industries. While the Baumé scale was adopted throughout England, the Twaddell scale was used in England and Scotland.

The scale is named after the scientific instrument manufacturer William Twaddell of Glasgow, who first developed hydrometers on this scale at the start of the 19th century.

== Converting between Twaddell scale and specific gravity ==
let a = any degree of Twaddell's Hydrometer, x = specific gravity in relation to water taken at 1.000

$$x = 0.005a + 1$$
$a = \frac{x - 1}{0.005}$

== See also ==
- Baumé scale
