= Urinometer =

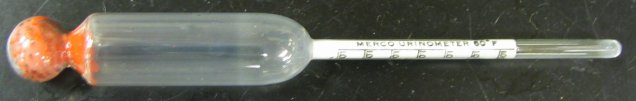
A typical urinometer

An Urinometer is a simple piece of equipment for determining urine specific gravity.

== Description ==
A typical urinometer is composed of a float, a weight, and a stem. The float is an air-filled glass tube, ending in the weight on the left and the stem on the right. The weight is a bulb filled with ball bearings embedded in a red solid, probably a glue of some sort. The glass stem extends to the right, and has calibrated graduations and numbers marked off to indicate specific gravity measurements.

== Application ==
An urinometer is typically used in medical diagnostic labs. It is placed in a tube of urine, and where the meniscus of the urine reaches displays the specific gravity of the urine.

== See also ==
- Urinalysis
