= Baumé scale =

Tool used for measuring the density of liquids

The Baumé scale is a pair of hydrometer scales developed by the French pharmacist Antoine Baumé in 1768 to measure density of various liquids. The unit of the Baumé scale has been notated variously as degrees Baumé, °B, °Bé and simply Baumé (the accent is not always present). One scale measures the density of liquids heavier than water and the other, liquids lighter than water. The Baumé of distilled water is 0. The API gravity scale is based on errors in early implementations of the Baumé scale.

== Definitions ==
Baumé degrees (heavy) originally represented the percent by mass of sodium chloride in water at 60 °F (16 °C). Baumé degrees (light) was calibrated with 0 °Bé (light) being the density of 10% NaCl in water by mass and 10 °Bé (light) set to the density of water.

Consider, at near room temperature:

- +100 °Bé (specific gravity, 3.325) would be among the densest fluids known (except some liquid metals), such as diiodomethane.
- Near 0 °Bé would be approximately the density of water.
- −100 °Bé (specific gravity, 0.615) would be among the lightest fluids known, such as liquid butane.

Thus, the system could be understood as representing a practical spectrum of the density of liquids between −100 and 100, with values near 0 being the approximate density of water.

== Conversions ==
The relationship between specific gravity (s.g.; i.e., water-specific gravity, the density relative to water) and degrees Baumé is a function of the temperature. Different versions of the scale may use different reference temperatures. Different conversions formulae can therefore be found in various handbooks.

As an example, a 2008 handbook states the conversions between specific gravity and degrees Baumé at a temperature of 60 °F (16 °C): (Note: This definition, with two different moduli, is the American standard of Baumé.)

$$\begin{align}
\mathrm{degrees\ Baum\acute{e}} &= \begin{cases}
\displaystyle 145\left(1 - \frac{1}{\text{s.g.}}\right) &\text{for density greater than water} \\[3pt]
\displaystyle\frac{140}{\text{s.g.}} - 130 &\text{for density lesser than water}
\end{cases} \\[3pt]
\text{s.g.} &= \begin{cases}
\displaystyle\frac{145}{145 - \text{degrees Baum}\mathrm{\acute{e}}} &\text{for density greater than water} \\[3pt]
\displaystyle\frac{140}{130 + \text{degrees Baum}\mathrm{\acute{e}}} &\text{for density lesser than water}
\end{cases}
\end{align}$$

The numerator in the specific gravity calculation is commonly known as the "modulus".

An older handbook gives the following formulae (no reference temperature being mentioned): (Note: NIST source refers to the 144-based heavy scale as "Holland" or "old".)

$$\text{s.g.} = \begin{cases}
\displaystyle\frac{144}{144 - \text{degrees Baum}\mathrm{\acute{e}}} &\text{for density greater than water} \\[3pt]
\displaystyle\frac{144}{134 + \text{degrees Baum}\mathrm{\acute{e}}} &\text{for density lesser than water}
\end{cases}$$

== Other scales ==
Because of vague instructions or errors in translation a large margin of error was introduced when the scale was adopted. The API gravity scale is a result of adapting to the subsequent errors from the Baumé scale. The Baumé scale is related to the Balling, Brix, Plato and 'specific gravity times 1000' scales.

== Use ==
Before standardization on specific gravity around the time of World War II the Baumé scale was generally used in industrial chemistry and pharmacology for the measurement of density of liquids. Today the Baumé scale is still used in various industries such as sugar beet processing, ophthalmics, starch industry, winemaking, industrial water treatment, metal finishing, and printed circuit board (PCB) fabrication. It is also used for caustic in refining process.

== See also ==
- Brix scale
- Ripeness in viticulture
