= Hydrometer =

Device used to measure density of liquids

Schematic drawing of a hydrometer. The lower the density of the fluid, the deeper the weighted float B sinks. The depth is read off the scale A.

A hydrometer or lactometer is an instrument used for measuring density or relative density of liquids based on the concept of buoyancy. They are typically calibrated and graduated with one or more scales such as specific gravity.

A hydrometer usually consists of a sealed hollow glass tube with a wider bottom portion for buoyancy, a ballast such as lead or mercury for stability, and a narrow stem with graduations for measuring. The liquid to test is poured into a tall container, often a graduated cylinder, and the hydrometer is gently lowered into the liquid until it floats freely. The point at which the surface of the liquid touches the stem of the hydrometer correlates to relative density. Hydrometers can contain any number of scales along the stem corresponding to properties correlating to the density.

Hydrometers are calibrated for different uses, such as a lactometer for measuring the density (creaminess) of milk, a saccharometer for measuring the density of sugar in a liquid, or an alcoholometer for measuring higher levels of alcohol in spirits.

The hydrometer makes use of Archimedes' principle: a solid suspended in a fluid is buoyed by a force equal to the weight of the fluid displaced by the submerged part of the suspended solid. The lower the density of the fluid, the deeper a hydrometer of a given weight sinks; The stem is calibrated to give a numerical reading.

== History ==
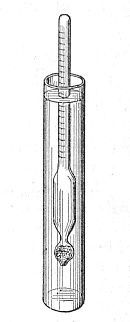
Hydrometer from Practical Physics

The hydrometer probably dates back to the Greek philosopher Archimedes (3rd century BC) who used its principles to find the density of various liquids. An early description of a hydrometer comes from a Latin poem, written in the 2nd century AD by Remnius, who compared the use of a hydrometer to the method of fluid displacement used by Archimedes to determine the gold content of Hiero II's crown.

Hypatia of Alexandria (b. c. 350–370; d. 415 CE), an important female Greek mathematician, is the first person traditionally associated with the hydrometer. In a letter, Synesius of Cyrene asks Hypatia, his teacher, to make a hydrometer for him:

The instrument in question is a cylindrical tube, which has the shape of a flute and is about the same size. It has notches in a perpendicular line, by means of which we are able to test the weight of the water. A cone forms a lid at one of the extremities, closely fitted to the tube. The cone and the tube have one base only. This is called the baryllium. Whenever you place the tube in water, it remains erect. You can then count the notches at your ease, and in this way ascertain the weight of the water.

According to the Encyclopedia of the History of Arabic Science, it was used by Abū Rayhān al-Bīrūnī in the 11th century and described by Al-Khazini in the 12th century. It was rediscovered in 1612 by Galileo and his circle of friends, and used in experiments especially at the Accademia del Cimento. It appeared again in the 1675 work of Robert Boyle (who coined the name "hydrometer"), with types devised by Antoine Baumé (the Baumé scale), William Nicholson, and Jacques Alexandre César Charles in the late 18th century, more or less contemporarily with Benjamin Sikes' discovery of the device by which the alcoholic content of a liquid can be automatically determined. The use of the Sikes device was made obligatory by British law in 1818.

== Ranges ==
The hydrometer sinks deeper in low-density liquids such as kerosene, gasoline, and alcohol, and less deep in high-density liquids such as brine, milk, and acids. It is usual for hydrometers to be used with dense liquids to have the mark 1.000 (for water) near the top of the stem, and those for use with lighter liquids to have 1.000 near the bottom. In many industries a set of hydrometers is used (1.0–0.95, 0.95–.) to have instruments covering the range of specific gravities that may be encountered.

== Scales ==
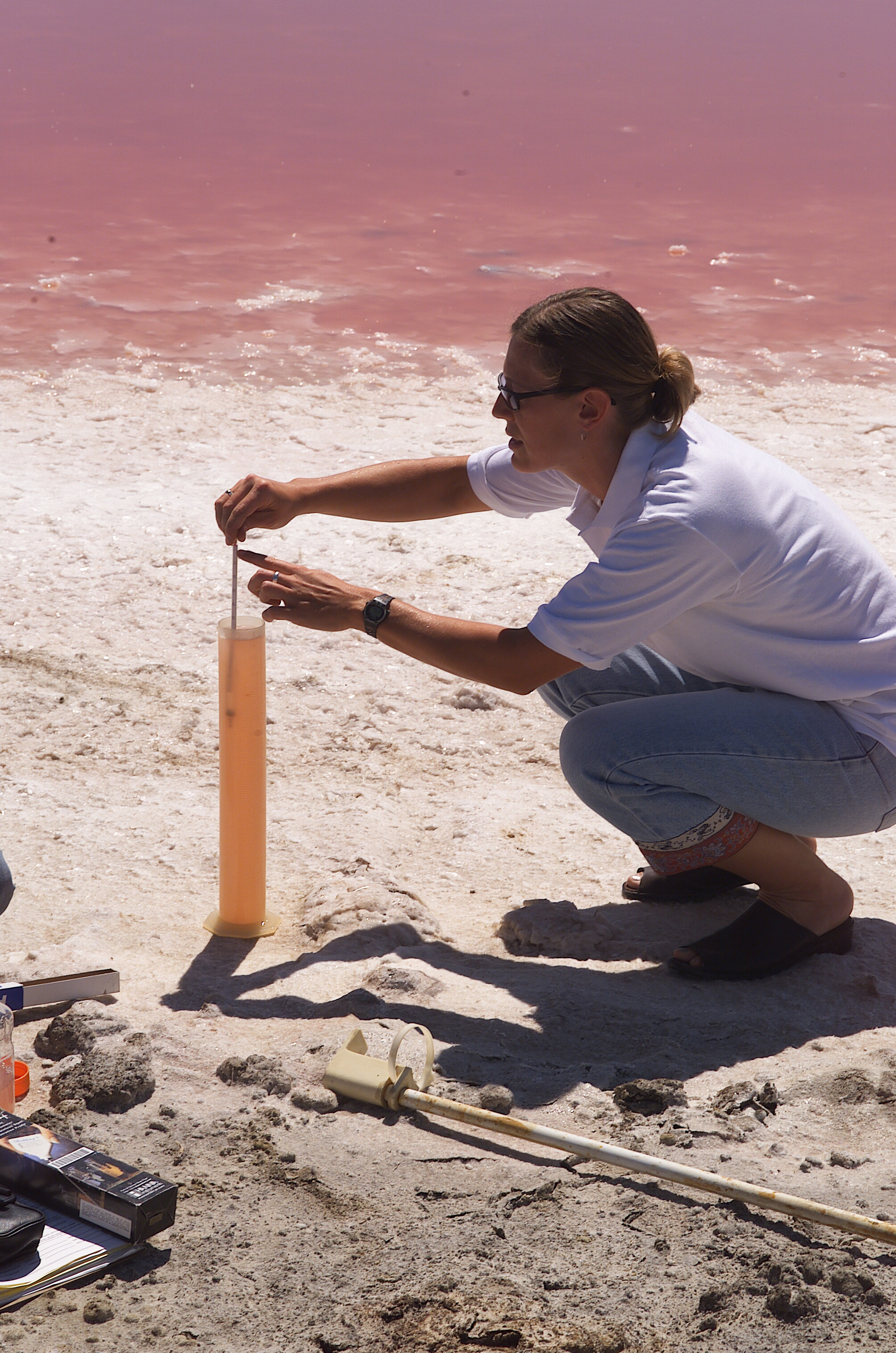
A NASA worker using a hydrometer to measure the brine density of a salt evaporation pond

Modern hydrometers usually measure specific gravity but different scales were (and sometimes still are) used in certain industries. Examples include:

- API gravity, universally used worldwide by the petroleum industry.
- Baumé scale, formerly used in industrial chemistry and pharmacology
- Brix scale, primarily used in fruit juice, wine making and the sugar industry
- Oechsle scale, used for measuring the density of grape must
- Plato scale, primarily used in brewing
- Twaddell scale, formerly used in the bleaching and dyeing industries

== Specialized hydrometers ==
Specialized hydrometers are frequently named for their use: a lactometer, for example, is a hydrometer designed especially for use with dairy products. They are sometimes referred to by this specific name, sometimes as hydrometers.

=== Alcoholometer ===
An alcoholmeter is a hydrometer that indicates the alcoholic strength of liquids which are essentially a mixture of alcohol and water. It is also known as a proof and Tralles hydrometer (after Johann Georg Tralles, but commonly misspelled as traille and tralle). It measures the density of the fluid. Where no sugar or other dissolved substances are present, the specific gravity of a solution of ethanol in water can be directly correlated to the concentration of alcohol. Saccharometers for measuring sugar-water mixtures measure densities greater than water. Many have scales marked with volume percents of "potential alcohol", based on a pre-calculated specific gravity. A higher "potential alcohol" reading on this scale is caused by a greater specific gravity, assumed to be caused by the introduction of dissolved sugars or carbohydrate based material. A reading is taken before and after fermentation and approximate alcohol content is determined by subtracting the post fermentation reading from the pre-fermentation reading.

These were important instruments for determining tax, and specific maker's instruments could be specified. Bartholomew Sikes had a monopoly in the UK and Mary Dicas and her family enjoyed a similar monopoly in the US.

=== Lactometer ===
A lactometer is used to check purity of cow's milk. The specific gravity of milk does not give a conclusive indication of its composition since milk contains a variety of substances that are either heavier or lighter than water. Additional tests for fat content are necessary to determine overall composition. The instrument is graduated into a hundred parts. Milk is poured in and allowed to stand until the cream has formed, then the depth of the cream deposit in degrees determines the quality of the milk. If the milk sample is pure, the lactometer floats higher than if it is adulterated or impure.

=== Saccharometer ===
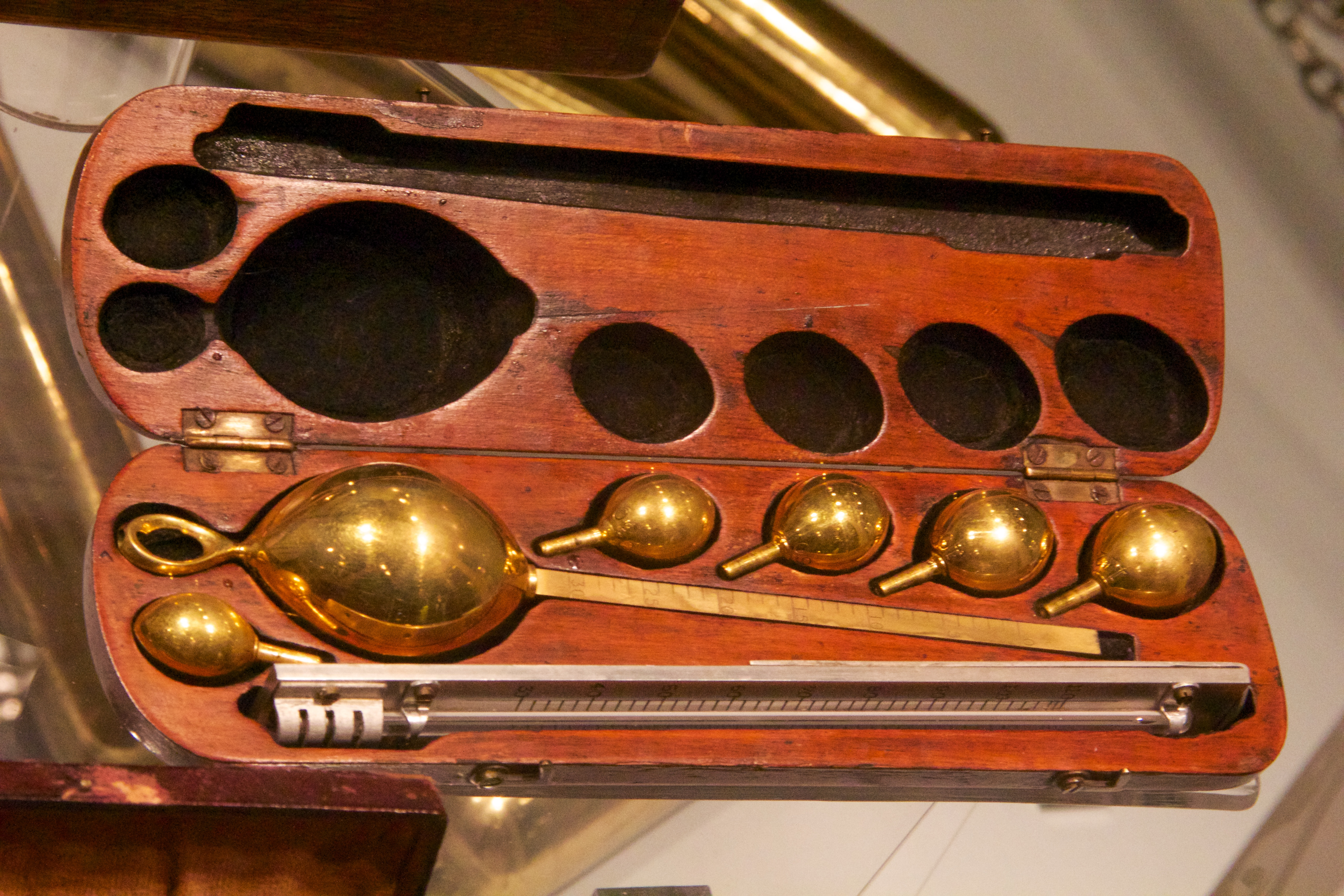
A 20th century saccharometer

A saccharometer is a type of hydrometer used for determining the amount of sugar in a solution, invented by Thomas Thomson. It is used primarily by winemakers and brewers, and it can also be used in making sorbets and ice-creams. The first brewers' saccharometer was constructed by Benjamin Martin (with distillation in mind), and initially used for brewing by James Baverstock Sr in 1770. Henry Thrale adopted its use and it was later popularized by John Richardson in 1784.

The saccharometer consists of a large weighted glass bulb with a thin stem rising from the top with calibrated markings. The sugar level can be determined by reading the value where the surface of the liquid crosses the scale. The higher the sugar content, the denser the solution, and thus the higher the bulb will float.

=== Thermohydrometer ===
A thermohydrometer is a hydrometer that has a thermometer enclosed in the float section. For measuring the density of petroleum products, such as fuel oils, the specimen is usually heated in a temperature jacket with a thermometer placed behind it since density is dependent on temperature. Light oils are placed in cooling jackets, typically at 15 °C. Very light oils with many volatile components are measured in a variable volume container using a floating piston sampling device to minimize light end losses.

=== Battery hydrometer ===
The state of charge of a lead-acid battery can be estimated from the density of the sulfuric acid solution used as electrolyte. A hydrometer calibrated to read specific gravity relative to water at 60 °F (16 °C) is a standard tool for servicing automobile batteries. Tables are used to correct the reading to the standard temperature. Hydrometers are also used for maintenance of wet-cell nickel-cadmium batteries to ensure the electrolyte is of the proper strength for the application; for this battery chemistry the specific gravity of the electrolyte is not related to the state of charge of the battery.

A battery hydrometer with thermometer (thermohydrometer) measures the temperature-compensated specific gravity and electrolyte temperature.

=== Antifreeze tester ===
Another automotive use of hydrometers is testing the quality of the antifreeze solution used for engine cooling. The degree of freeze protection can be related to the density (and so concentration) of the antifreeze; different types of antifreeze have different relations between measured density and freezing point.

=== Acidometer ===
An acidometer, or acidimeter, is a hydrometer used to measure the specific gravity of an acid.

=== Barkometer ===
A barkometer is calibrated to test the strength of tanning liquors used in tanning leather.

=== Salinometer ===
A salinometer is a hydrometer used to measure the salt content of the feed water to a marine steam boiler.

=== Urinometer ===
A urinometer is a medical hydrometer designed for urinalysis. As urine's specific gravity is dictated by its ratio of solutes (wastes) to water, a urinometer makes it possible to quickly assess a patient's overall level of hydration.

=== Gallery ===
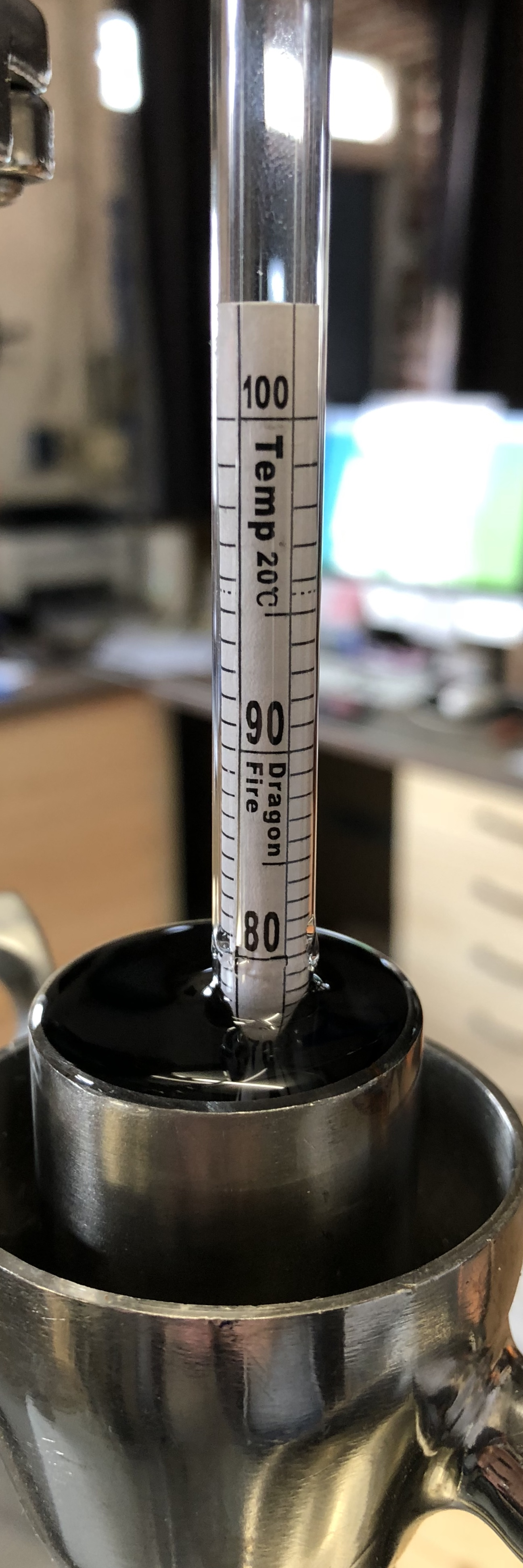
Alcohol meter to measure ethanol concentration of a water/ethanol mixture, shown in the "parrot head" of a still

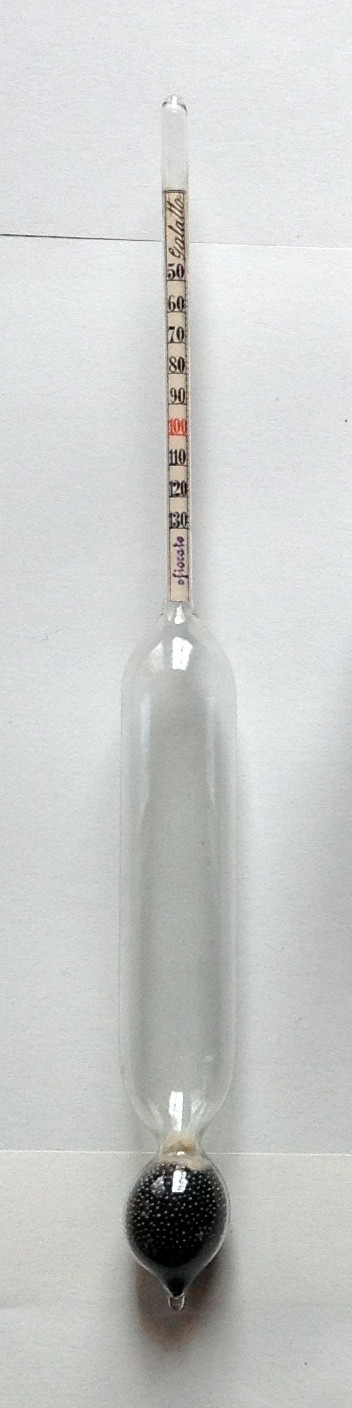
Lactometer to measure the density of milk, indicating its fat content

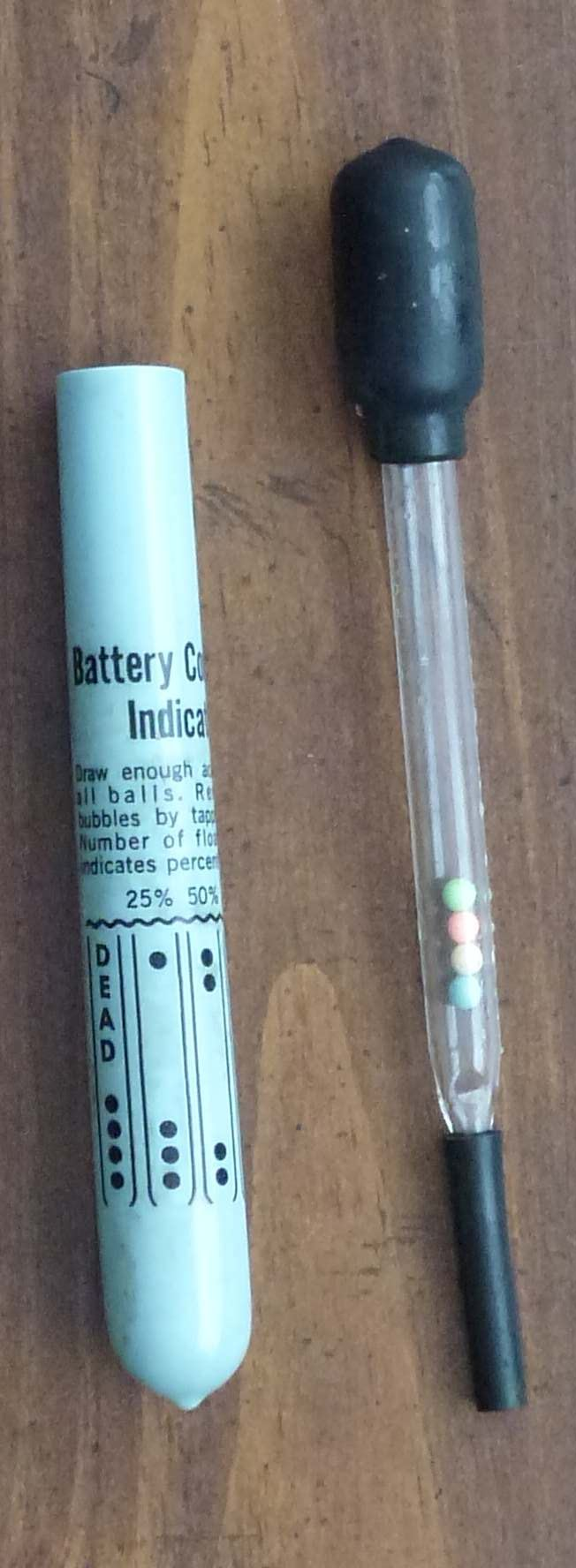
Battery condition indicator to measure electrolyte density in a lead–acid battery, indicating its state of charge (~1985)

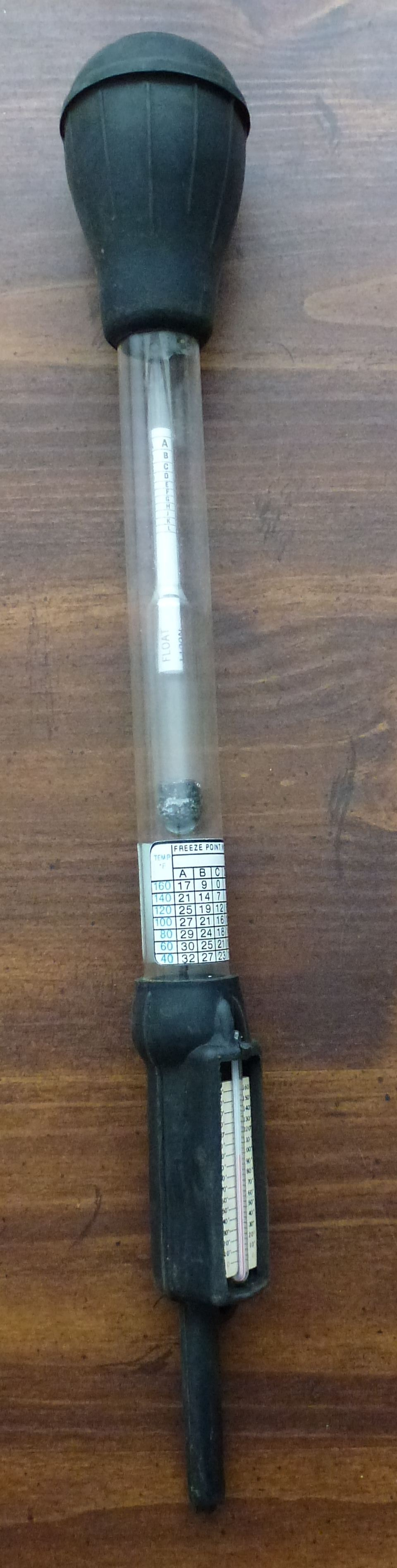
Antifreeze tester to measure engine coolant density, indicating its freezing point.

== Use in soil analysis ==
A hydrometer analysis is the process by which fine-grained soils, silts and clays, are graded. Hydrometer analysis is performed if the grain sizes are too small for sieve analysis. The basis for this test is Stokes' Law for falling spheres in a viscous fluid in which the terminal velocity of fall depends on the grain diameter and the densities of the grain in suspension and of the fluid. The grain diameter thus can be calculated from a knowledge of the distance and time of fall. The hydrometer also determines the specific gravity (or density) of the suspension, and this enables the fraction of particles of a certain equivalent particle diameter to be calculated.

== See also ==
- Density meter
- Densitometer
- Dasymeter
- Elevator paradox (physics)
- Fahrenheit hydrometer
- Gravity (beer)
- Hydrostatic bubbles
- Hygrometer
- Oscillating U-tube
- Pyknometer
- Refractometer

== Sources ==
- Hypatia of Alexandria
- Hydrometer Information
- Guide to Brewing Hydrometers
- Jurjen Draaijer. Milk Testing. Milk Producer Group Resource Book, Food and Agriculture Organization of the United Nations
- Using Your Hydrometer, Winemaking Home Page.
- How The Hydrometer Works, Home Winemaking Techniques
