= Thomas Pridgin Teale =

Thomas Pridgin Teale may refer to:

- Thomas Pridgin Teale (died 1867) (1800–1867), British surgeon
- Thomas Pridgin Teale (died 1923) (1831–1923), British surgeon, son of the above
