= Richard Reynolds (chemist) =

English chemist

Richard Reynolds, FCS (12 May 1829 – 5 April 1900), was an English pharmaceutical chemist, optician, instrument maker, and X-ray pioneer.

== Life and times ==
Reynolds came from a long line of Quakers, being a descendant of John Gurney. On 12 May 1829, he was born at Banbury, Oxford, England. His father Richard Freshfield Reynolds was an apothecary, known as the druggist of Banbury. His mother was Maria Reynolds, née Bassett. In 1843, Reynolds left school and became apprenticed to James Deane, chemist at Clapham Common. In 1844, he went to Leeds and apprenticed to the chemist Thomas Harvey. During the years 1850 to 1851, he attended the London School of Pharmacy and took first prizes for the examinations held by the Pharmaceutical Society in chemistry, materia medica (medical material/substance) and botany. At this time, T. B. Groves, Henry T. Watts, Dr. William Squire and other notable individuals were at "The Square". The Pharmaceutical Society was located on "The Square". Reynolds returned to Clapham and worked for two years with the chemist James Deane. During the time at Clapham, he took an interest in the analysis of native samples of carbonate of soda. In 1854, Reynolds returned to Leeds as partner with Harvey in the chemist business and the firm became Harvey & Reynolds. In 1861, the firm was joined by a Mr. Fowler and became Harvey, Reynolds & Fowler. By 1864, Thomas Harvey had retired, Mr. Haw joined the business and the company became Haw & Reynolds. In 1867, the business was listed as Haw, Reynolds, & Co. Reynolds was a Fellow of the Chemical Society. He was elected member in 1864 and served as council member since 1870. He worked in the Colony of Natal in the Drakensberg region for three years between 1880 and 1883. He was outspokenly sympathetic to the Zulu people, and he wrote fondly of picnics at Tugela Falls and Ncandu Falls. In 1894, he was elected vice-president of the Chemical Society. In 1900, he died at home at Cliff Road, Hyde Park in Leeds.

== Reynolds and Branson ==
In 1883, Frederick Woodward Branson joined the business and in 1886 the firm became Reynolds & Branson. In June 1898, a notice in Chemist and Druggist announced the firm of Reynolds & Branson, Limited was formed as a limited corporation.

== X-ray pioneers ==
On 24 July 1896, Reynolds and Branson attended the Photographic Convention of the United Kingdom at Leeds. The firm was represented in various sessions. During the session on Orthochromatic Photography, Branson gave a presentation on X-ray apparatus that included a well received demonstration and repeated as follows:

“... Mr. Branson, of Messrs. Reynolds and Branson, who had made a special study of X-ray work, gave a demonstration which for lucidity and completeness has rarely been equalled. In the course of his remarks he fully explained the construction and exhaustion of the tubes, and showed various forms and explained his method of making calcium tungstate, which was to mix solutions of sodium tungstate and calcium chloride, collect, wash, and dry the precipitate of calcium tungstate which was formed, and then to fuse this in a small muffle furnace at the temperature of the melting point of cast-iron, and reduce to small crystals in a mortar, mix with varnish, and coat a screen. With such a screen in contact with the plate he had been able to show osseous structure of the hand, measuring only one-hundredth of an inch, with an exposure of one minute. A comparison of the fluorescent appearance of the three salts, calcium tungstate, platinocyanide of barium, and platinocyanide of potassium, was shown, the first and last being the best for photographic work, as the fluorescence was blue, and the barium salt was most satisfactory for visual work, as the fluorescence was yellow.”

At the same convention, during the session on Photography at the Seaside the firm displayed some of their product line that included X-ray apparatus, as follows:

“Reynolds & Branson, of Commercial Street, Leeds, had a very high-class show, special prominence being given to apparatus for X-ray work. A case of lenses of all the leading makers, together with a very well-made photo-micrographic outfit, a cabinet of chemicals, another of cameras, and all the little odds and ends of apparatus, made up a very fine show."

== Professional service ==
- Leeds Medical School, lecturer in chemistry
- Leeds Philosophical and Literary Society, honorary secretary
- Pathological Society, honorary secretary
- Pharmaceutical Conference, founding member
- Pharmaceutical Conference, honorary secretary
- Pharmaceutical Conference, president, 1881
- Pharmaceutical Society, examiner
- Pharmaceutical Society, councillor
- Chemists' and Druggists' Trade Association of Great Britain, inaugural chairman, 1876
- American Pharmaceutical Association, honorary member, 1882

== Publications ==
- Reynolds, Richard. (1853). Chemical Examination of Specimen of Native Carbonate of Soda. Pharmaceutical Journal and Transactions. Page 517.
- Reynolds, Richard. (1859). On the Fire and Choke Damp Indicator, Invented by George F. Ansell, Esq., of the Royal Mint. Proceedings of the Geological and Polytechnic Society of the West Riding of Yorkshire, 4, 545–554.
- Reynolds, Richard. (January 1886). Abnormal Barometrical Disturbances in Yorkshire, in 1883 and 1884. In Proceedings of the Yorkshire Geological and Polytechnic Society (Vol. 9, No. 2, pp. 214–220). Geological Society of London.
- Reynolds, Richard. (1887). Report of the Result of a Chemical Examination of a Fragment of Calculus. The Lancet, 130(3347), 816.
- Reynolds, Richard. (1896). The Dictionary of National Biography. (1896): 68.
