= Leeds Philosophical and Literary Society =

Learned society in Leeds, West Yorkshire, England

Leeds Philosophical and Literary Society is a learned society in Leeds, West Yorkshire, England. It was founded in 1819, and its museum collection forms the basis of Leeds City Museum, which reopened in September 2008. The printed works and papers of the society are held by Leeds University Library. The Society is a registered charity under English law.

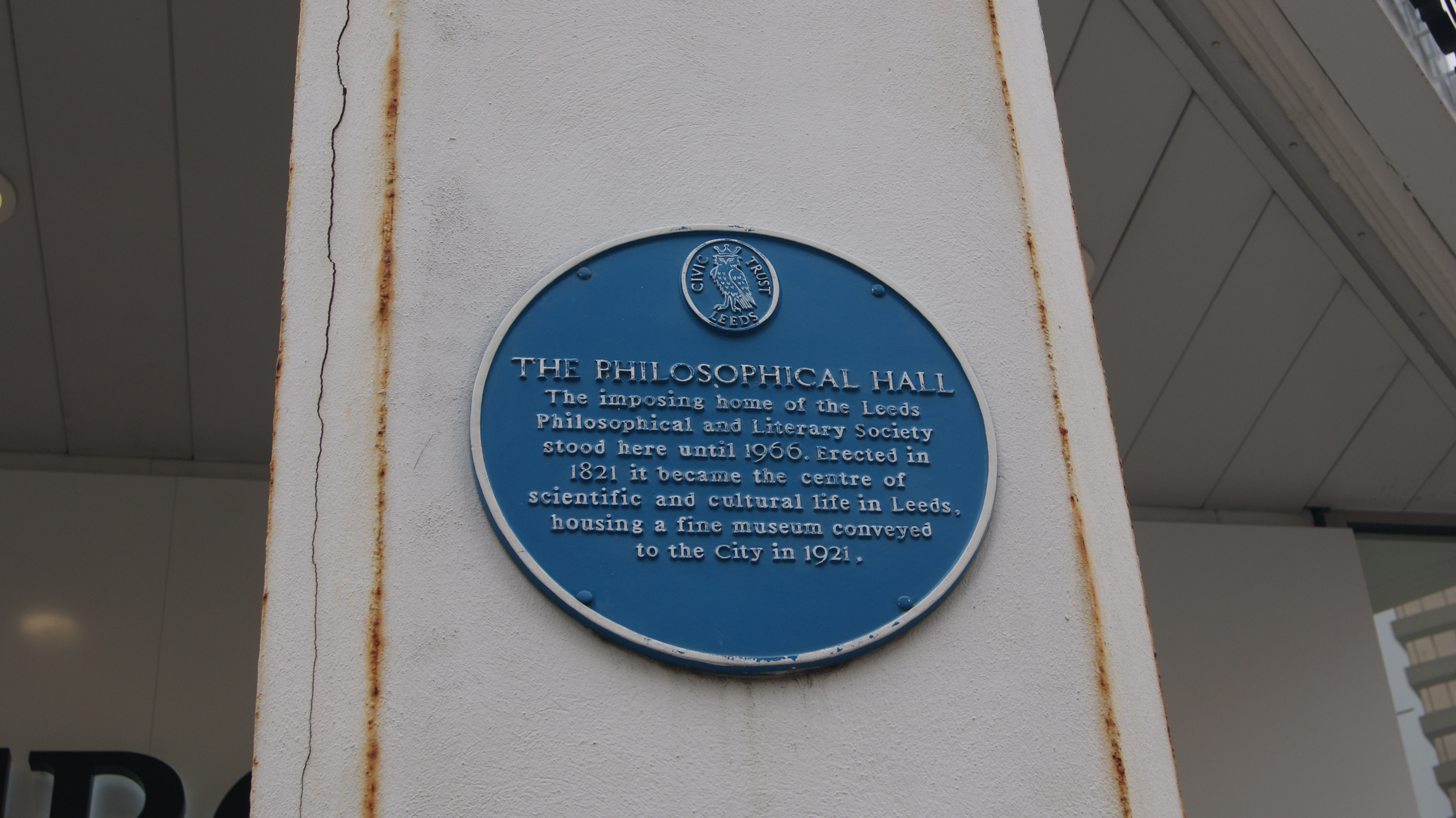
Blue plaque, HSBC, Park Row, Leeds (25 August 2017) – marking site of Leeds' Philosophical Hall

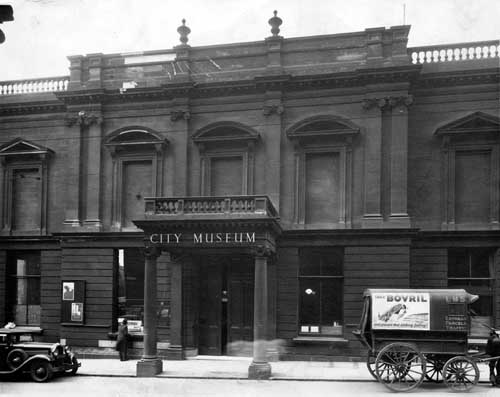
The City Museum on Park Row before its air raid damage

Among the early members of the society were John Marshall (President, 1820–1926), Benjamin Gott, William Hey (President, 1831–1933), and Edward Baines and his son, Sir Edward Baines. Richard Reynolds was an honorary secretary. More recent Presidents include John Le Patourel (1966–1968).

== Foundation ==
Robert Dennis Chantrell won the competition to build the new Hall for the Society in May 1819 in Classical style. The Hall was sited on the corner of Park Row and Bond Street in the Georgian west end of Leeds. The foundation stone was laid by Benjamin Gott on 9 July 1819 and the Hall was opened on 6 April 1821. The Hall had a lecture theatre, library, laboratory and museum. Charles Turner Thackrah gave the opening address, pointing out that the Hall would provide a place for "the conversational diffusion of knowledge". Before the creation of any college or university in Leeds, the Society provided an important opportunity for civic education.

== Later history ==
The Hall was refaced and extended in 1861-62 by Dobson & Chorley. A new entrance was built on Park Row. In 1876, the inaugural meeting of the Leeds Architectural Association was held in the Hall.

The Hall was badly damaged in an air raid in 1941 when many museum exhibits were lost, but the building was given a new concrete façade and remained as a museum until 1965. The Hall was demolished in 1966. William Gott was a benefactor to the museum, and one of the Society's vice presidents in later life.

In 1925, the Society began publishing two journals: Proceedings of the Leeds Philosophical and Literary Society. Scientific section (which ran from 1925 to 1998, producing twelve volumes) and Proceedings of the Leeds Philosophical and Literary Society. Literary and Historical Section (which ran from 1925 to 1999, producing twenty-five volumes).

The Society celebrated its bicentenary in 2019 and launched a new website in 2021.

== List of presidents ==
The following have been presidents of the society:

- 1820–26: John Marshall
- 1826–28: Rev. W. H. Bathurst, M.A.
- 1828–31: Michael Thomas Sadler, M.P.
- 1831–33: William Hey
- 1833–35: James Williamson, M.D.
- 1835–37: Rev. Joseph Holmes, M.A.
- 1837–40: Rev. Richard Winter Hamilton
- 1840–42: Adam Hunter, M.D.
- 1842–45: John Hope Shaw
- 1845–50: Rev. William Sinclair, M.A.
- 1850–51: William West, F.R.S.
- 1851–54: Rev. Charles Wicksteed, B.D.
- 1854–57: John Hope Shaw
- 1857–58: James Garth Marshall, F.G.S.
- 1858–59: Rev. W. F. Hook, D.D.
- 1859–61: Rev. Alfred Barry, M.A.
- 1861–63: Thomas Pridgin Teale, F.R.S.
- 1863–66: Rev. Thomas Hincks, B.A.
- 1866–68: Charles Chadwick, M.D.
- 1868–72: John Deakin Heaton, M.D.
- 1872–74: Rev. Canon Woodford, D.D.
- 1874–76: J. I. Ikin, F.R.C.S.
- 1876–78: Rev. J. H. McCheane, M.A.
- 1878–81: T. Clifford Allbutt, M.D., F.R.S.
- 1881–83: Rev. John Gott, D.D.
- 1883–85: J. E. Eddison, M.D.
- 1885–86: Edward Atkinson, F.L.S.
- 1886–89: Thomas Marshall, M.A.
- 1889–92: Thomas Pridgin Teale, M.A., F.R.S.
- 1892–94: Rev. J. H. D. Matthews, M.A.
- 1894–96: Rev. Charles Hargrove, M.A.
- 1896–98: Edmund Wilson, F.S.A.
- 1898–1900: Nathan Bodington, M.A., Litt.D.
- 1900–02: J. H. Wicksteed, President Inst.M.E.
- 1902–04: Arthur Smithells, B.Sc., F.R.S.
- 1904–06: J. E. Eddison, M.D.
- 1906–09: E. Kitson Clark, M.A., F.S.A., M.Inst.C.E.
- 1909–11: Rev. J. R. Wynne-Edwards, M.A.
- 1911–12: C. T. Whitmell, M.A., B.Sc., F.R.A.S.
- 1912–14: P. F. Kendall, M.Sc., F.G.S.
- 1914–17: Rev. W. H. Draper, M.A.
- 1917–19: James E. Bedford, F.G.S.
- 1919–22: Sydney D. Kitson, M.A., F.S.A., F.R.I.B.A.
- 1922–24: Arthur J. Grant, M.A.
- 1924–26: Walter Garstang, M.A., D.Sc., F.Z.S.
- 1926–28: Edwin Hawkesworth
- 1928–30: Frederick Woodward Branson, F.I.C.
- 1930–32: E. O. Dodgson
- 1932–34: A. Gilligan, D.Sc., F.G.S.
- 1934–36: Richard Whiddington, M.A., D.Sc., F.R.S.
- 1936–39: Hugh R. Lupton, M.C., M.A.
- 1939–46: W. M. Edwards, M.C., M.A.
- 1946–48: E. A. Spaul, D.Sc., Ph.D.
- 1948–50: W. L. Andrews
- 1950–52: J. N. Tetley, D.S.O., LL.D.
- 1952–54: Terry Thomas, M.A., LL.D., B.Sc., Ph.D.
- 1954–56: H. C. Versey, D.Sc., F.G.S.,
- 1956–58: H. S. Vick, J.P.
- 1958–60: H. Orton, M.A., B.Litt.
- 1960–62: Sir George Martin, LL.D., J.P.
- 1962–64: E. J. Wood, M.A.
- 1964–66: Reginald Dawson Preston, D.Sc., F.R.S., F.Inst.P.
- 1966–68: John Le Patourel, M.A., D.Phil.
- 1968–70: G. P. Meredith, M.Sc., M.Ed., Ph.D.
- 1970–72: J. G. Wilson, M.A., Ph.D., F.Inst.P.
- 1972–74: J. Taylor, M.A.
- 1974–76: H. Henson, D.Sc., Ph.D., F.R.E.S.
- 1976–78: P. R. J. Burch, M.A., Ph.D.
- 1978–81: R. Reed, M.Sc., Ph.D
- 1981–83: Lord Marshall of Leeds, M.A., LL.B.
- 1983–85: B. R. Hartley, M.A., F.S.A.
- 1985–87: Dennis Cox, B.A., A.L.A.
- 1987–89: B. Colville, M.B., B.S., F.R.C.G.P.
- 1989–91: I. S. Moxon, M.A., B.A.
- 1991–93: R. F. M. Byrn, M.A., Ph.D.
- 1993–95: Mrs J. E. Mortimer, B.A.
- 1995–97: A. C. Chadwick, B.Sc., Ph.D., D.Sc., C.Biol., F.I.Biol., F.R.G.S.
- 1997–99: O. S. Pickering, B.A., B.Phil., Ph.D., Dip.Lib.
- 1999–2003: P. J. Evennett, B.Sc., Ph.D., Hon. F.R.M.S.
- 2004–06: M. R. D. Seaward, M.Sc., Ph.D., D.Sc., F.L.S.
- 2007–09: C. J. Hatton, B.Sc., Ph.D., C.Phys., F.Inst.P.
- 2010–13: A. C. T. North, B.Sc., Ph.D., C.Phys., F.Inst.P.
- 2014-16: J. M. Hill B.A., D.Phil., D.Univ., F.E.A., F.R.S.A.
- 2016–19 : C. J. Hatton, B.Sc., Ph.D., C.Phys., F.Inst.P.
- 2020–23: G. E. Blair, B.Sc., Ph.D., F.R.S.B., F.L.S.
- 2024- : M. Staniforth, B.A., Ph.D.

== Former curators of the museum (1821–1921) ==
- John Atkinson
- Henry Denny
- Louis Compton Miall
- Henry Crowther

== Other notable figures connected to the society ==
- Etheldred Benett – donor
- Alexander Crichton – donor
- Violet Crowther - curator
- William Gott - benefactor and vice president
- James Kitson, 1st Baron Airedale and his father James Kitson, Mayor of Leeds – new proprietary member and subscriber respectively in 1852–53
- Francis Lupton – proprietary member in 1852–53
- William Middleton and his son John William Middleton – subscriber and new ordinary member respectively in 1852–53
- James Motley – donor
- Washington Teasdale – member
- John Joseph Willson – member
- Michael Meadowcroft - member and secretary
- Janet Douglas (historian) - council member

== See also ==
- List of libraries in Leeds
