= Medical thermometer =

Device for measuring body temperature

Clinical thermometer
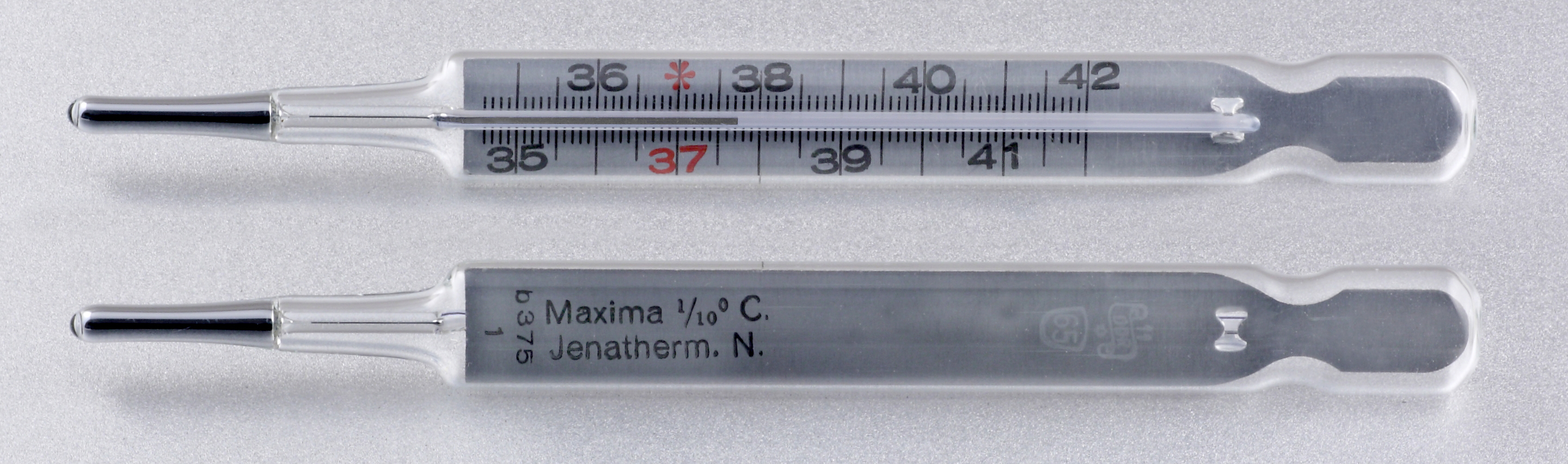
- A medical/clinical mercury thermometer showing a temperature of 37.7 °C (99.9 °F)
- Purpose: Measures body temperature

A medical thermometer or clinical thermometer is a device that is used to measure the body temperature of a human or other animal. The tip of a thermometer is inserted into one of several locations – under the tongue (for oral or sublingual temperature), under the armpit (for axillary temperature), into the rectum via the anus (for rectal temperature), into the ear (for tympanic temperature) – or placed on the forehead (for temporal temperature).

== History ==
The medical thermometer began as an instrument called a water thermoscope, constructed by Italian physicist/astronomer Galileo Galilei c. 1592–1593. This instrument lacked an accurate scale with which to measure temperature, and it could be affected by changes in atmospheric pressure.

Italian physiologist Santorio Santorio is the first person known to have put a measurable scale on the thermoscope; he wrote about it in 1625, though he may have invented one as early as 1612. His models were bulky, impractical, and took a fair amount of time to take an accurate oral reading of a patient's temperature.

Two people switched from using water to using alcohol in the thermometer. The earliest was Ferdinando II de' Medici, Grand Duke of Tuscany (1610–1670), who created an enclosed thermometer that used alcohol c. 1654. Physicist/engineer Daniel Gabriel Fahrenheit (1686–1736) made contributions to thermometers as well. He created an alcohol thermometer in 1709 and later produced the first mercury thermometer in 1714. Mercury, he found, responded more quickly to temperature changes than the previously used water.

Fahrenheit also created the temperature scale which is named after him, having recorded the system in 1724. The scale is still used primarily for everyday applications in the United States and its territories and associated states (all served by the U.S. National Weather Service), as well as in the Bahamas, Belize, and the Cayman Islands.

Dutch mathematician/physicist Christiaan Huygens created a clinical thermometer in 1665, to which he added an early form of the Celsius scale by aligning the scale to the freezing and boiling points of water. By 1742, Swedish astronomer Anders Celsius created the Celsius temperature scale that was the reverse of the modern scale – 0 represented the boiling point of water, while 100 represented freezing. This scale was reversed by Swedish botanist Carolus Linnaeus in 1744.

Working independently of Celsius, French scientist Jean-Pierre Christin – permanent secretary of the Académie des sciences, belles-lettres et arts de Lyon (transl. Academy of Sciences, Belles-Lettres and Arts of Lyon) – developed a similar scale in which 0 represented the freezing point of water and 100 represented boiling. On 19 May 1743, he published the design of a mercury thermometer that used this scale, called the "Thermometer of Lyon", built by the craftsman Pierre Casati.

The medical thermometer was used by Hermann Boerhaave, as well as his students Gerard van Swieten and Anton de Haen. It was also utilised around this time by Scottish physician George Martine. De Haen made particular advances in medicine with the thermometer. By observing the correlation between a patient's change in temperature and the physical symptoms of an illness, De Haen concluded that a record of one's temperature could inform the doctor about a patient's health. However, his proposals were not received enthusiastically by his peers, and the medical thermometer remained a scarcely used instrument in medicine.

Thermometers remained cumbersome to transport and use during this period. By the mid-19th century, the medical thermometer was still a foot in length (30.28 cm) and took as long as twenty minutes to take an accurate temperature reading. Between 1866 and 1867, English physician Sir Thomas Clifford Allbutt designed a medical thermometer that was much more portable – measuring only six inches long and taking only five minutes to record a patient's temperature. This thermometer was first manufactured in Leeds by a local firm, Harvey & Reynolds, which was established by Quakers Richard Reynolds and Thomas Harvey.

In 1868, German physician, psychiatrist, and medical professor Carl Reinhold August Wunderlich published his studies that consisted of more than one million readings of 25,000 patients' temperatures, taken in the underarm. With these findings, he concluded a healthy human's temperature fell within the range of 36.3 to 37.5 °C (97.34 to 99.5 °F).

Theodor Benzinger (1905–1999) invented the ear thermometer in 1964. Born in Stuttgart, he immigrated to the United States in 1947 and became a naturalised citizen in 1955. He worked from 1947 to 1970 in the bioenergetics division at the Naval Medical Research Center in Bethesda, Maryland.

== Classification by location ==
A person's temperature can be measured in various locations around the body which maintain a fairly stable temperature (mainly oral, axillary, rectal, tympanic, or temporal). Normal temperature varies slightly with location; an oral reading of 37 °C does not correspond to rectal, temporal, or other readings with the same value. When a temperature is quoted, the location should also be specified. If a temperature is stated without qualification (e.g., typical body temperature), this temperature is usually assumed to be sublingual (under the tongue).

Differences between core temperature and measurements at different locations – known as clinical bias – are related to normal human body temperature. Measurements are subject to both site-dependent clinical bias and variability between a series of measurements (i.e., standard deviation of the differences). For example, one study found that the clinical bias of rectal temperatures was greater than for ear temperature as measured by a selection of thermometers being tested; however, the variability in rectal temperatures was lower.

=== Oral ===
Oral temperature may only be taken from a patient who is capable of holding the thermometer securely under the tongue. This requirement generally excludes small children or people who are unconscious or overcome by coughing, weakness, or vomiting. (This requirement is a lesser problem with fast-reacting digital thermometers, but it is a significant issue with mercury thermometers, which take several minutes to stabilise their reading.) If a patient has drunk a hot or cold liquid before taking their temperature, time must be allowed for the mouth temperature to return to its normal value.

The typical range of a sublingual thermometer for human use is from about 35 °C to 42 °C (or 90 °F to 110 °F).

=== Armpit ===
Armpit (axilla) temperature is measured by holding the thermometer tightly under the armpit. A person needs to hold the thermometer for several minutes to obtain an accurate measurement. Axillary temperature plus 1 °C offers an effective estimate of rectal temperature in patients older than 1 month. Accuracy with axillary temperature is known to be inferior to rectal temperature.

=== Rectal ===
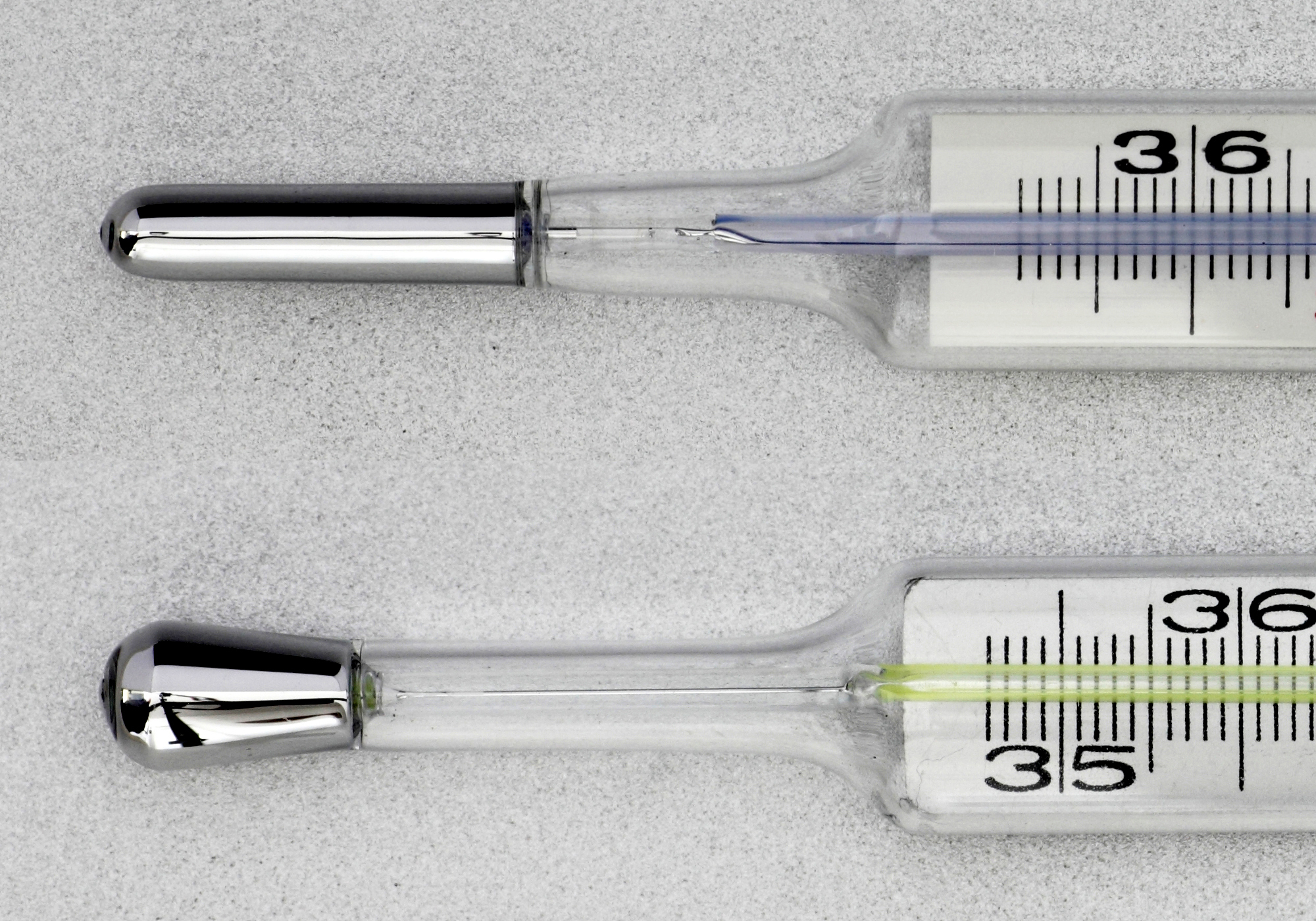
Different test prods (top: universal test prod; bottom: rectal test prod)

Rectal temperature-taking, especially if performed by a person other than the patient, should be facilitated by using a water-based personal lubricant. Although rectal temperature is the most accurate, this method may be considered unpleasant or embarrassing; in 1966, Time magazine mentioned "what for many remains a humiliating procedure ... insertion of a rectal thermometer". Moreover, if taken incorrectly, rectal temperature-taking can be uncomfortable and in some cases painful for the patient. Rectal temperature-taking is considered the method of choice for infants.

=== Ear ===
The ear thermometer was invented by Theodor Benzinger in 1964. At the time, he was attempting to obtain a reading that was as close to the brain's temperature as possible, since the hypothalamus area (at the brain's base) regulates core body temperature. He accomplished this by using the ear canal's eardrum blood vessels, which are shared with the hypothalamus. Before the invention of the ear thermometer, temperature readings could be easily taken only from the mouth, rectum, or underarm. Previously, if doctors wanted to record an accurate brain temperature, electrodes needed to be attached to the patient's hypothalamus.

The tympanic thermometer has a projection (protected by a single-use hygienic sheath) that contains an infrared probe. The projection is gently placed in the ear canal, and a button is pressed; the temperature is then read and displayed within about a second. These thermometers are used in both homes and medical facilities.

Certain factors make readings from this thermometer somewhat unreliable – for example, faulty placement in the external ear canal by a human operator, or earwax blocking the canal. Such factors usually cause readings to fall below their true value, so a fever may not be detected.

=== Forehead ===
==== Temporal artery ====
Temporal artery thermometers (also called temporal thermometers) – which use infrared radiation to report temperature – are increasingly common in clinical practice because they are easy to use and minimally invasive. Because of varying considerations with technique and environment, measurements by these thermometers may suffer from problems with precision and (to a lesser degree) accuracy. Temporal thermometers have been found to have a low sensitivity of 60–70% – but a very high specificity of 97–100% – for detecting fever and hypothermia. Because of this discrepancy, it is suggested that these thermometers should not be used in acute care settings such as an intensive care unit (ICU) or with patients where a temperature imbalance is strongly suspected. Evidence from studies using this thermometer supports higher accuracy and precision amongst children.

==== Plastic strip thermometer ====
A plastic strip thermometer is applied to a patient's brow. The thermometer is typically a band that has been coated with different temperature-sensitive markings. At a given temperature, the markings (i.e., numerals) in a particular region of the thermometer become visible. This thermometer may indicate a fever, but such a reading is considered inaccurate.

== Classification by technology ==
=== Liquid-filled ===
The traditional thermometer is a glass capillary tube, with a bulb at one end containing a liquid which expands uniformly with temperature. The tube itself is narrow and shows calibration markings. The contained liquid is often mercury, but alcohol thermometers use a coloured alcohol. Medically, a maximum thermometer is often used, which indicates the maximum temperature reached even after the thermometer is removed from the body.

To use the thermometer, its bulb is placed where the temperature is to be measured, and the bulb is left long enough to reach definite thermal equilibrium – typically five minutes in the mouth and ten minutes under the armpit. The maximum reading is achieved via a constriction in the neck near the bulb. As the bulb's temperature rises, the liquid expands up the tube through the constriction. When the temperature falls, the column of liquid breaks at the constriction and cannot return to the bulb, thus remaining stationary in the tube. After its value is read, the thermometer must be reset by repeatedly swinging it sharply, in order to shake the liquid back through the constriction.

==== Mercury ====
The mercury-in-glass thermometer has been considered the most accurate liquid-filled type. However, mercury is a toxic heavy metal, and it is only used in clinical thermometers if protected from tube breakage.

The tube must be narrow to minimise the amount of mercury contained: the temperature of the tube is uncontrolled, so the tube must contain much less mercury than the bulb to minimise the effect of tube temperature. This requirement makes temperature reading difficult, because the narrow mercury column is difficult to view. Visibility is less of a problem when the thermometer contains a coloured liquid.

Many states in the United States prohibit using and selling mercury thermometers because of the risk of mishandling and spilling, as well as potential mercury poisoning; the vigorous swinging needed to reset a mercury maximum thermometer facilitates accidental breakage and the release of poisonous mercury vapors. Mercury thermometers have largely been replaced by electronic digital thermometers or (more rarely) thermometers containing liquids other than mercury (such as galinstan, coloured alcohols and heat-sensitive liquid crystals).

==== Gallium ====
The company Geratherm markets a thermometer billed as "the first analogue thermometer without mercury", because the thermometer contains the liquid metal gallium. Gallium is considered non-toxic; when disposed of, it does not raise environmental concerns. Like mercury, gallium is liquid at human body temperature (with a melting point of 29.7 °C). However, according to the manufacturer, the thermometer actually uses an alloy of gallium, indium and tin, which results in a lower melting temperature.

=== Phase-change (dot matrix) thermometers ===
Phase-change thermometers use samples of inert chemicals which melt at progressively higher temperatures – from 35.5 °C to 40.5 °C in increments of 0.1 °C. These samples are mounted as small dots in a matrix on a thin plastic spatula with a protective transparent cover. This spatula is placed under a patient's tongue. After a short time, the spatula is removed, and the operator can see which dots have melted and which have not; the temperature is taken as the melting temperature of the last dot to melt. These devices are cheap and disposable, so it is not necessary to sterilise a thermometer for reuse.

=== Liquid crystal ===
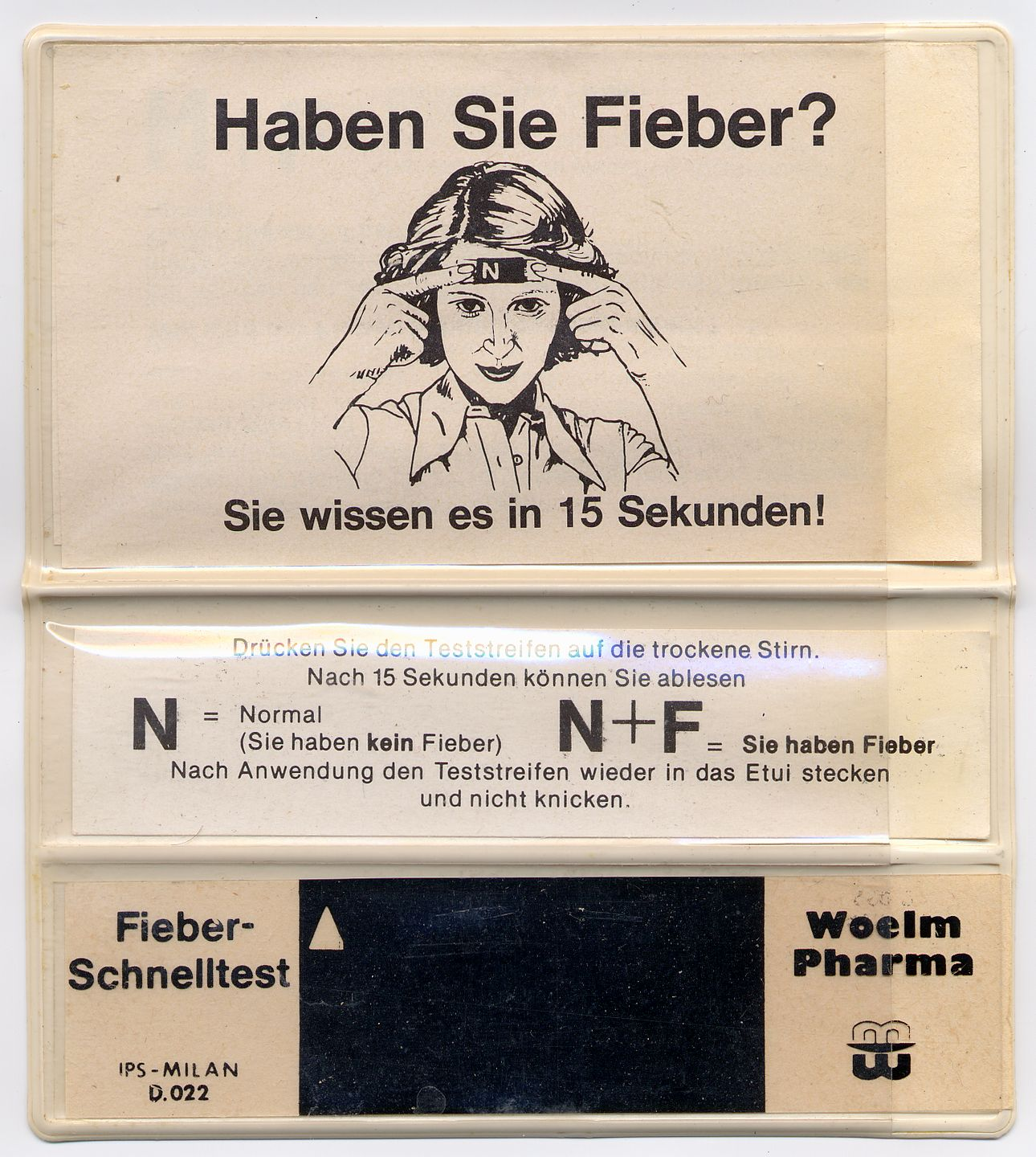
Quick test based on thermochromic colours

A liquid crystal thermometer contains heat-sensitive (thermochromic) liquid crystals in a plastic strip; these crystals change colour to indicate different temperatures.

=== Electronic ===
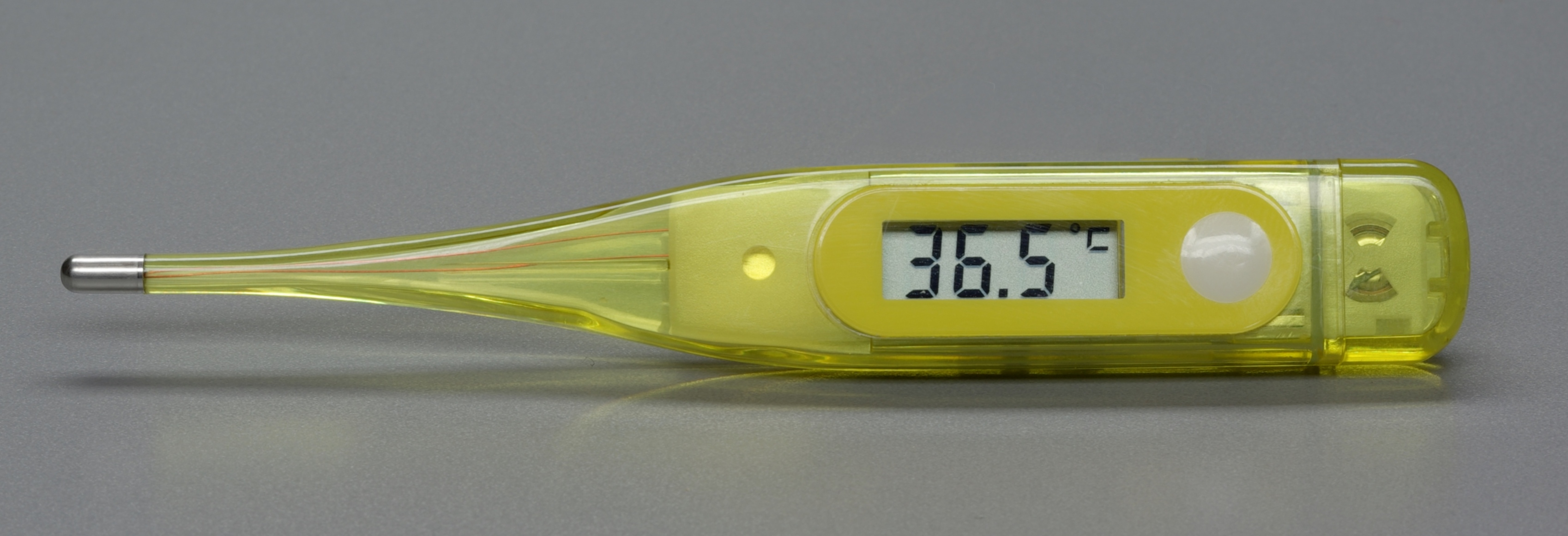
Electronic clinical thermometer

Since compact and inexpensive methods of measuring and displaying temperature became available, electronic thermometers have been used; these are often called digital, because they display numeric values. Many thermometers display readings with a resolution of 0.1 °C (0.2 °F), but this resolution should not be taken as a guarantee of accuracy: the specified accuracy must be checked in the product documentation and maintained by periodic recalibration of the device. A typical inexpensive electronic ear thermometer for home use has a displayed resolution of 0.1 °C, but a stated accuracy within ±0.2 °C (±0.35 °F) when new. The first electronic clinical thermometer, invented in 1954, used a flexible probe that contained a Carboloy thermistor.

==== Resistance temperature detectors ====
Resistance temperature detectors (RTDs) are wire windings or other thin-film serpentines that exhibit changes in electrical resistance when temperature changes. RTDs measure temperature using the positive temperature coefficient of electrical resistance in metals; the hotter these metals become, the higher their resistance. Platinum is the most commonly used material for three reasons: it is nearly linear over a wide range of temperatures; it is very accurate; and it has a fast response time. RTDs can also be made of copper or nickel. Advantages of RTDs include having stable output for long periods of time. They are also easy to calibrate and provide very accurate readings. Disadvantages include a smaller overall temperature range, higher initial cost, and a less rugged design.

==== Thermocouples ====
Thermocouple devices are accurate, highly sensitive to small temperature changes, and respond quickly to changes in an environment. These devices consist of a pair of dissimilar metal wires joined at one end. The metal pair generates a net thermoelectric voltage between the wire ends according to the temperature difference between these ends. The advantages of thermocouples include high accuracy and reliable operation over an extremely wide range of temperatures. These devices are also well-suited for making automated measurements that are both inexpensive and durable. The disadvantages associated with this type of digital thermometer include errors caused by use over an extended period of time, and a requirement for two temperatures to take measurements.

Thermocouple materials are subject to corrosion, which can affect the thermoelectric voltage.

==== Thermistor ====
Thermistor elements are the most sensitive temperature sensors available. A thermistor is a semiconductor device with an electrical resistance that is proportional to temperature. There are two types of devices:

- Negative temperature coefficient (NTC) devices are used in temperature sensing and are the most common type of thermistor. NTCs have temperatures that vary inversely with their resistance – so when temperature increases, resistance decreases, and vice versa. NTCs are constructed from oxides of materials such as nickel, copper and iron.
- Positive temperature coefficient (PTC) devices are used in electric current control. They function inversely to NTCs, in that resistance increases as temperature increases. PTCs are constructed from thermally sensitive silicon or polycrystalline ceramic materials.

The advantages of NTC thermistor thermometers include a small size and a high degree of stability. NTCs are also long-lasting and very accurate. Disadvantages include nonlinearity and unsuitability for use in extreme temperatures.

==== Contact ====
Some electronic thermometers work through contact: the electronic sensor is placed where a temperature is to be measured, and it is left long enough to reach thermal equilibrium. These thermometers typically reach equilibrium faster than mercury thermometers; the contact thermometer may beep when equilibrium has been reached, or the timing may be specified in the manufacturer's documentation.

==== Infrared ====
Another type of electronic thermometer works by remote sensing: an infrared sensor responds to the radiation spectrum emitted from the target location. Although these thermometers do not directly contact the area being measured, they may still contact part of the body. (For example, a thermometer which senses the temperature of the eardrum without touching it must be inserted into the ear canal.) To eliminate the risk of patient cross-infection, disposable probe covers and single-use clinical thermometers of all types are used in clinics and hospitals.

==== Accuracy ====
According to a 2001 study, electronic thermometers on the market significantly underestimate higher temperatures and overestimate lower temperatures. The researchers conclude that "the current generation of electronic, digital clinical thermometers, in general, may not be sufficiently accurate or reliable to replace the traditional glass/mercury thermometers."

=== Basal thermometer ===
A basal thermometer is used to take the basal (base) body temperature – the temperature upon waking. Basal body temperature is much less affected than daytime temperature by environmental factors such as exercise and food intake. This stability allows small changes in body temperature to be detected.

Glass oral thermometers typically have markings every 0.1 °C or 0.2 °F. However, basal temperature is stable enough to require accuracy of at least 0.05 °C or 0.1 °F, so special glass basal thermometers are distinct from normal glass oral thermometers. Digital thermometers which have sufficient resolution (i.e., 0.05 °C or 0.1 °F) may be suitable for monitoring basal body temperatures; the specification should be checked to ensure absolute accuracy, and thermometers (like most digital instruments) should be calibrated at specified intervals. If only the variation in basal temperature is needed, absolute accuracy is not essential, so long as readings have small variability. (For example, if real temperature varies from 37.00 °C to 37.28 °C, a thermometer which inaccurately but consistently reads a change from 37.17 °C to 37.45 °C indicates the magnitude of the change.) Some digital thermometers are marketed as "basal thermometers" and have extra features – these may include a larger display, expanded memory functions, or beeping to confirm proper thermometer placement.

== Smart and wearable thermometers ==
A smart thermometer can transmit its readings for collection, storage and analysis. Wearable thermometers can provide continuous measurement, but they make it difficult to measure core body temperature.

== See also ==
- Liquid crystal thermometer
