= Louis Compton Miall =

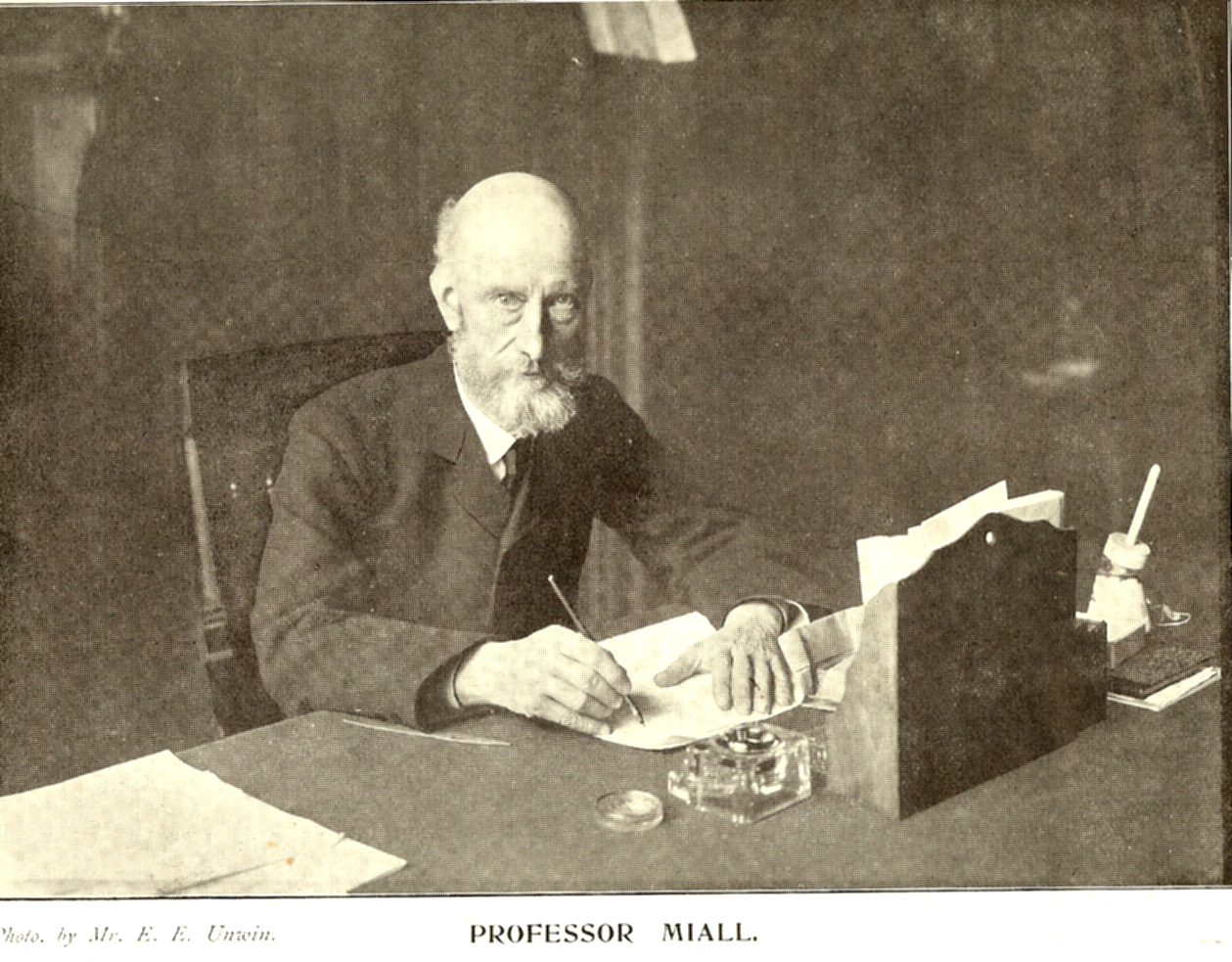

Louis Compton Miall FRS (12 September 1842, Bradford – 21 February 1921, Leeds) was an English palaeontologist and biologist who was Professor of Biology at the University of Leeds.

== Early life ==
Miall was the fifth child of Reverend James Goodeve and Elizabeth Symonds Mackenzie. His mother's side of the family included many physicians while several of his paternal relatives were involved in education. His grandfather Moses Miall had moved from Hampshire to establish the Mansion House School, Islington, in 1822. A half-uncle Edward Miall was involved in the passing of the Elementary Education Act 1870. Following his older brothers, Miall was sent to Silcoates School, Wakefield in 1852. A master J. B. Figgis made an impression on him. After completing school he was put in a teaching position in a school that his parents had established for the children of parishioners. Relations at home became strained when Miall joined his father's chapel and began to have questions. He then accepted an assistant mastership position at a school in Stamford Hill, London, run by George Todd. Todd had graduated from University College London and with his encouragement Miall attended mathematics lectures by Augustus de Morgan. Miall also became a secretary to the Bradford Philosophical Society through the influence of R. H. Meade. He became more active as a naturalist, becoming a member of the Todmorden Botanical Society. He became involved in setting up a new museum at Bradford, collecting geological specimens along with John Brigg. Miall was also involved in establishing the library and organizing lectures. Through the lectures at the museum he met Thomas Henry Huxley, Richard Owen, Edwin Lankester, and Henry Roscoe. Huxley's advice that Miall study anatomy led Miall to join the Leeds School of Medicine in 1867. His brother Philip had qualified in medicine from Edinburgh and practiced in Bradford. From 1871 to 1892 Miall was curator of the museum of the Leeds Philosophical and Literary Society. During this period he was involved in a dissection of an elephant along with Frederick Greenwood of the school of medicine. This was published as was another study of a crocodile. The discovery of a fossil labyrinthodont Pholiderpeton scutigerum helped Miall's election into the Geological Society in 1875. Along with Alfred Denny, Miall wrote on the cockroach in Hardwicke's Science Gossip. This was later revisited as a book. Miall gave up an offer for the chair of geology at Yorkshire College, preferring that it went to his friend Alexander Green. He took up a newly created chair of biology the next year. From 1876 to 1904 he was Professor of Biology at the Yorkshire College. He also taught biology at Firth College, Sheffield between 1882 and 1884 and ensured that the position was taken over by his friend Alfred Denny . After the Yorkshire College became the University of Leeds in 1904, Miall continued in the same role until he retired in 1907. He received an honorary doctorate from Leeds in 1904, the only degree he held. He was succeeded by both V. H. Blackman, FRS (as professor of botany) and Walter Garstang (as professor of zoology). In 1892 he talked on the surface film of water for plants and animals at the Royal Institution in 1892. In the same year Miall was elected a Fellow of the Royal Society (FRS). From 1904 to 1906 he was Fullerian Professor of Physiology at the Royal Institution. At the annual meetings of the British Association he presided over the zoological section in 1897 and the education section in 1908.

Remembering Miall at Leeds around the 1890s, C. M. Gillespie wrote that

in academic policy, as in matters generally, Miall stood for caution: he always spoke slowly, giving the impression that he weighed each word carefully as he uttered it. His primary interest was in teaching and its correlative, learning. He held to the naturalist's doctrine that you learn by direct observation and experiment, and not by listening to others [...] Miall was an ideal lecturer, clear, confident and methodical.

== Personal life ==
Miall married Emily, sister of Robert Pearce, in 1870 and his wife, a linguist and writer, died in 1918. There were three children from the marriage. Stephen (1872-1947) studied at Yorkshire College and became a solicitor, Rowland (1879-1955) taught English in Zurich and later directed a scientific instruments company. Daughter Winifred married botanist Harold Wager (1862-1930).

== Later life and death ==
Miall retired in 1907 and lived at Yorkshire and Letchworth for some time. He was involved in founding the Letchworth natural history and antiquarian society in 1908. He took an interest in gardening and planned several books. After the death of his wife he moved to Yorkshire and lived at the Ben Rhydding Hydro where he collaborated with classical scholars working on memoirs of the Leeds Philosophical and Literary Society. Miall died of a stroke in Leeds in 1921, aged 78.

== Selected publications ==
- with Frederick Greenwood (1827–1915): Anatomy of the Indian elephant. Studies in comparative anatomy; no. 2. Macmillan. 1878.
- The skull of the crocodile: a manual for students. Studies in comparative anatomy; no. 1. Macmillan. 1878.
- The geology, natural history and pre-historic antiquities of Craven in Yorkshire. J. Dodgson. 1878.
- with Thomas Edward Thorpe, Alexander Henry Green, Arthur William Rücker and Alfred Marshall: Green, Alexander Henry; Miall, Louis Compton; Marshall, Alfred (1878). Coal its history and uses.
- The life and work of Charles Darwin. R. Jackson. 1883.
- with Alfred Denny: The structure and life history of the cockroach (Periplaneta orientalis). 1886.
- Object lessons from nature. 1891; several editions
- Natural history of aquatic insects. Macmillan and co., limited; The Macmillan company. 1895.
- Round the year: a series of short nature studies. Macmillan. 1896.
- Thirty years of teaching. Macmillan. 1897.
- with A. R. Hammond: The structure and life-history of the harlequin fly (Chironomus). Clarendon Press. 1900.
- Injurious and useful insects: an introduction to the study of economic entomology. Bell's science series. G. Bell & Sons. 1902.
- House, garden and field: a collection of short nature studies. Edward Arnold. 1904; with illustrations by A. R. Hammond
- History of biology. A History of the sciences. G.P. Putnam's Sons. 1911.
- The early naturalists: their lives and work (1530–1789). Macmillan. 1912.
