= Thomas Pridgin Teale (died 1867) =

British surgeon

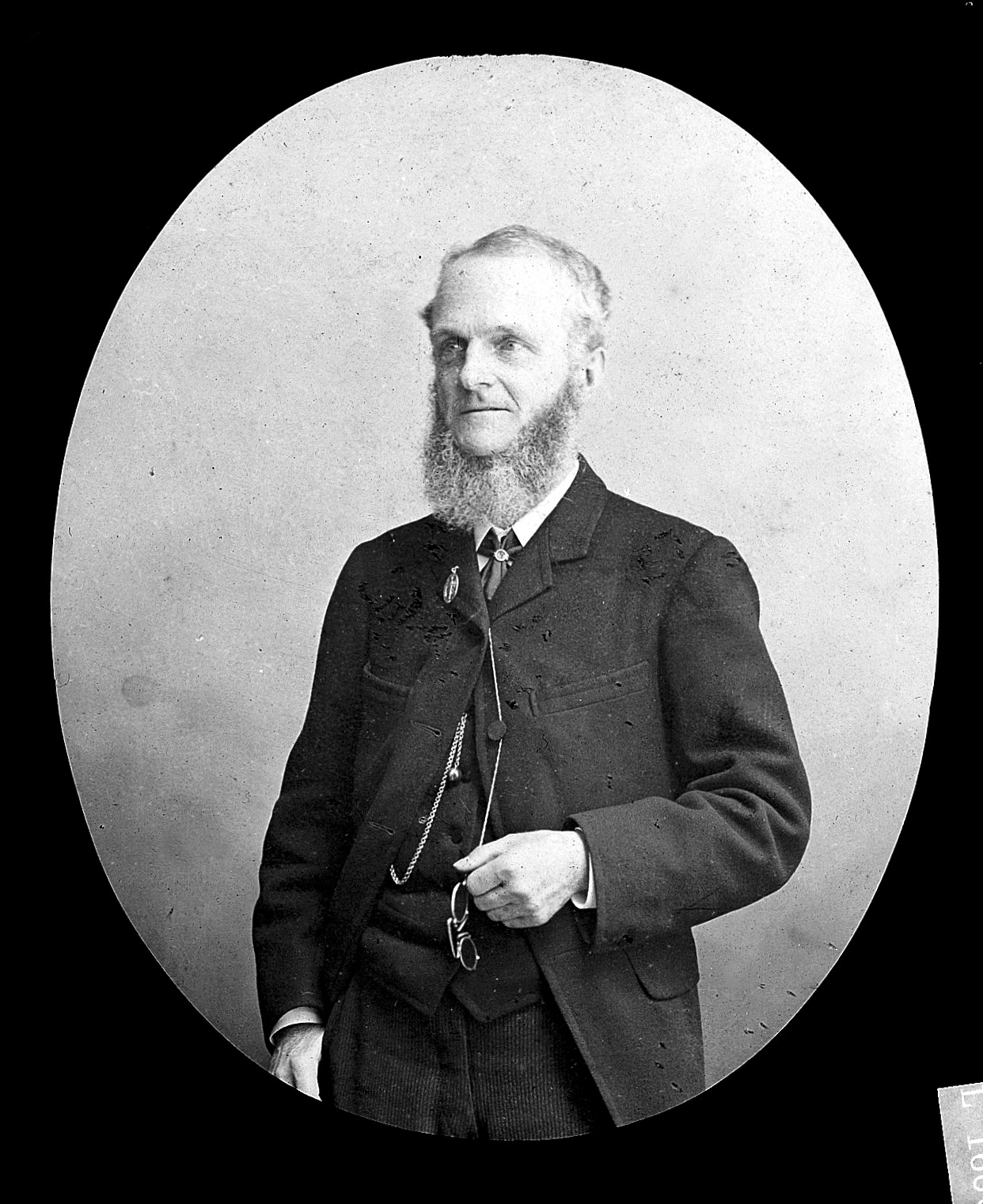
Thomas Pridgin Teale

Thomas Pridgin Teale FRS (1800 – 31 December 1867) was a British surgeon, elected a Fellow of the Royal Society on 5 June 1862. His father, Thomas Teale, and his son, Thomas Pridgin Teale were also surgeons.

Teale was one of the founders of the Leeds School of Medicine, and served as a surgeon at Leeds General Infirmary from 1833 to 1864.

He was President of the Leeds Philosophical and Literary Society from 1861 to 1863.
