= Reynolds and Branson =

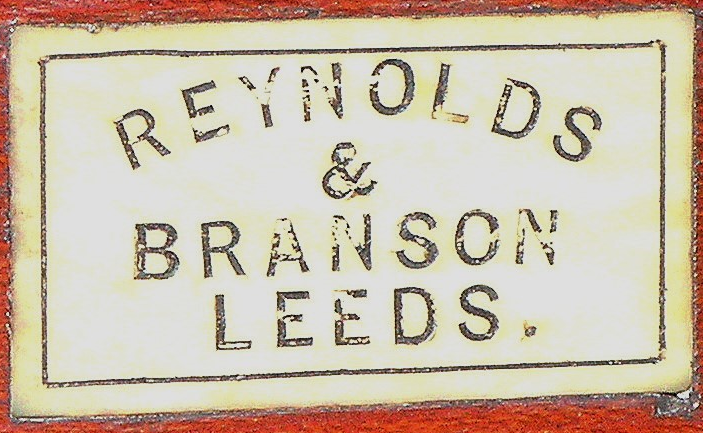
Reynolds & Branson Ltd, Leeds logo

Reynolds & Branson Leeds was a business based at 13 Briggate and 14 Commercial Street in Leeds, England. The business lasted from 1816 (210 years ago) to 1972 (54 years ago). Edward Matterson managed the company in 1822, and William West F.R.S. took over in 1833. The National Archives Records about the company include a day book, sales ledger, and prescription books. The records were created by Reynolds & Branson Ltd. Reynolds & Branson was registered in July 1898 as a limited corporation with a capital of £34,000 in shares of £10 each by Messrs. R. Reynolds, F. W. Branson. No remuneration was given to Mr. R. Reynolds, but a £700 per annum was given to each of the others. In 1890, Richard Reynold's son, Richard Freshfield (Fred) Reynolds was made a partner. The firm was in the business of wholesale and retail for chemists and surgical instrument makers.

== Origins ==
The original company can be traced back to 1816 (see Grace's Guide which is the leading source of historical information on industry and manufacturing in Britain). Edward Matterson was a druggist who ran the firm after being employed by Allen and Hanburys. He was educated at Leeds Grammar School. In 1822 the company moved to 13 Briggate, Leeds. In 1833 William West F.R.S. took over the company after Matterson went bankrupt (see The bankrupt directory: being a complete register of all the bankruptcies, with their residences, trades, and dates when they appeared in the London gazette, from December 1820 to April 1843). In 1839 Thomas Harvey joined the business, when William West left the company to pursue analytical chemistry. The firm was then renamed Thomas Harvey (Quaker). Harvey was born in 1811 at Barnsley into a Quaker family. His father was a linen manufacturer. The second of five children, he was educated at Barnsley Grammar in Yorkshire. From 1822 to 1825 Harvey studied at Ackworth and afterwards became a chemist apprentice for David Doncaster of Sheffield. Upon Doncaster's death he trained at Thomas Southalls in Birmingham for eight years. In 1837 Harvey settled in Leeds as a chemist. He became an anti-slavery campaigner and philanthropist.

== Richard Reynolds ==
In 1844 Richard Reynolds joined the company as an apprentice. He was born in 1829 and was the eldest son of an apothecary who died when the boy was only four years old. From 1850 to 1851 he attended the School of Pharmacy in London where he took first prizes in chemistry, materia medica and botany in a contest held by the pharmaceutical society. He then went to Mr. Henry Deane at Chapman for two years and returned to the Leeds business. In 1854 Richard Reynolds joined Thomas Harvey as a partner and the company then became Harvey & Reynolds. In 1861 the firm was joined by a Mr. Fowler and became Harvey, Reynolds & Fowler. By 1864 Thomas Harvey had retired (Noted in 1884). At the age of 72, he undertook an arduous journey to Canada on a Quaker mission but it exhausted him. He died on 25 December at his home at Ashwood, Headingley Lane. Mr. Haw then joined the business and the company became Haw & Reynolds. In 1867 the business was listed as Haw, Reynolds, & Co. In 1883 Fredrick W Branson joined the business. An 1884 advertisement listed the partnership between Reynolds & Branson (late Harvey, Reynolds & co).

== 1898–1914 ==
The firm of Reynolds & Branson was registered in July 1898 as a limited corporation with a capital of £34,000 in shares of £10 each by Messrs. R. Reynolds, F. W. Branson. No remuneration was given to Mr. R. Reynolds, but a £700 each per annum to the others. In 1890 Richard Reynold's son, Richard Freshfield (Fred) Reynolds was made a partner. The firm was in the business of wholesale and retail chemists and surgical instrument makers.[5] Fredrick W Branson now focused on the development of scientific apparatus and chemical glassware for the business. The company was flourishing under his management. Frederick Hartridge attended the University of Leeds in 1905, and then attending the School of Pharmaceutical Society in London in 1909. In 1901, during the outbreak of lead poisoning at Morley, the company was called in. Frederick W. Branson made recommendations which freed Morley from this scourge. In collaboration with A. F. Dimmock, M.D., he contributed to the British Medical Association meeting in 1903 a paper " A new method for the determination of uric acid in urine" (Br. Med. J., 1903, 2, 585). For this process he devised a correction scale which was contributed to the British Pharmaceutical Conference in 1904. At the 1905 meeting of the British Medical Association a further paper by these two authors was read, " A rapid and simple process for the estimation of uric acid " (ibid., 1905, 2, 1104), in which uric acid was precipitated and the precipitate measured in a specially graduated tube. In 1914, in collaboration with Dr. Gordon Sharp, he contributed a paper to the British Pharmaceutical Conference on the activity of digitalis leaves and the stability and standardisation of tinctures of digitalis.

== The war years ==
During the First World War, he actively pursued efforts to standardize the size and shape of chemical glassware. In 1916, he was elected as an inaugural member of the Society of Glass Technology. He organized research and published works on these topics. Branson sought to secure in Great Britain the manufacturing process for the glass required for the equipment of munition factories.[8][9] Branson contributed a paper on the composition of some types of chemical glassware to the Society of Chemical Industry (J. SOC. Chem. Ind., 1915, 34, 471) in collaboration with his son Frederick Hartridge, a paper to the Transactions of the Society of Glass Technology (1919, 3, 249) "A proposed standard formula for a glass for lamp workers". Branson was chairman until retirement in 1932. His son, Frederick Hartridge, Associate of the Royal Institute of Chemistry AIC, became chairman and managing director of Reynolds & Branson.[5][7] he run the company for 20 years, until his untimely death on 10 February 1952, Frederick Hartridge had appointed his 3 Sons and Daughter as directors of Reynolds & Branson, Frederick Norman the eldest son who attended Ilkley Grammar an all-boys school, Eileen his only daughter, Peter Orchard who as Director of Phospherade, which was the mineral water company, He attended Roundhay all-boys grammar school.

In the Second World War he was in the RAF with 54 Spitfire squadron, in 1942 married Rita Blackburn, he went to Australia with 54 Spitfire squadron at the end of 1942, he met Patricia A Grant his second wife. He married Patricia in Leeds 1948, Peter emigrated to Australia 1953, when his father died leaving the bulk of the business to his eldest brother Frederick Norman, He set up his own pharmacy in Blackburn South in 1955, He later become a Podiatrist retiring at the age of 90, Richard Orchard who attended Roundhay all-boys grammar school, Second World War Richard was also in RAF as a pilot he died on active service 1945. His eldest son Frederick Norman Branson became Chairman & Managing Director of Reynolds & Branson in 1953, he would run Reynolds & Branson for almost 20 years, at this point the company had a workforce of 150 people, In 1972 Frederick Norman Branson sold the business to Barclay, later selling to the asset strippers Slater & Walker.

== Reynolds & Branson Chronological Time Frame ==
- 1822, Edward Matterson druggist, dealer in paint and colours, Location 12, Briggate, Leeds Baines's Directory and Gazette.
- 1829, Edward Matterson, druggist located 13 Briggate & 4 Blundel place. Pigot's Directory
- 1833, William West F.R.S. took over the company after Matterson went bankrupt,
- 1839, Thomas Harvey, chemist and druggist, 5 Commercial Street. Leeds.
- 1841, Thomas Harvey, chemist and druggist, 13 Briggate. Leeds.
- 1854, Reynolds returned to Leeds as partner with Harvey in the chemist business and the firm became Harvey & Reynolds.
- 1856, Harvey & Reynolds, chemist and druggist, 13 Briggate. Leeds.
- 1861, Harvey, Reynolds & Fowler. Chemist and druggist, 10 Briggate. Leeds.
- 1864, Haw & Reynolds. Chemist and druggist. Briggate. Leeds. as Thomas Harvey had retired.
- 1867, Haw, Reynolds, & Co. Chemist and druggist. Briggate. Leeds.
- 1872, Haw, Reynolds & Co. Chemist. 14 Commercial Street, and 13 Briggate. Leeds.
- 1886, Reynolds & Branson. Makers of the first short clinical thermometer.
- 1891, Reynolds & Reynolds, chemist and druggist, 13 Briggate. Leeds
- 1901, Reynolds & Reynolds, chemist and druggist, 13 Briggate. Leeds
- 1911, Reynolds & Reynolds, chemist and druggist, 13 Briggate. Leeds

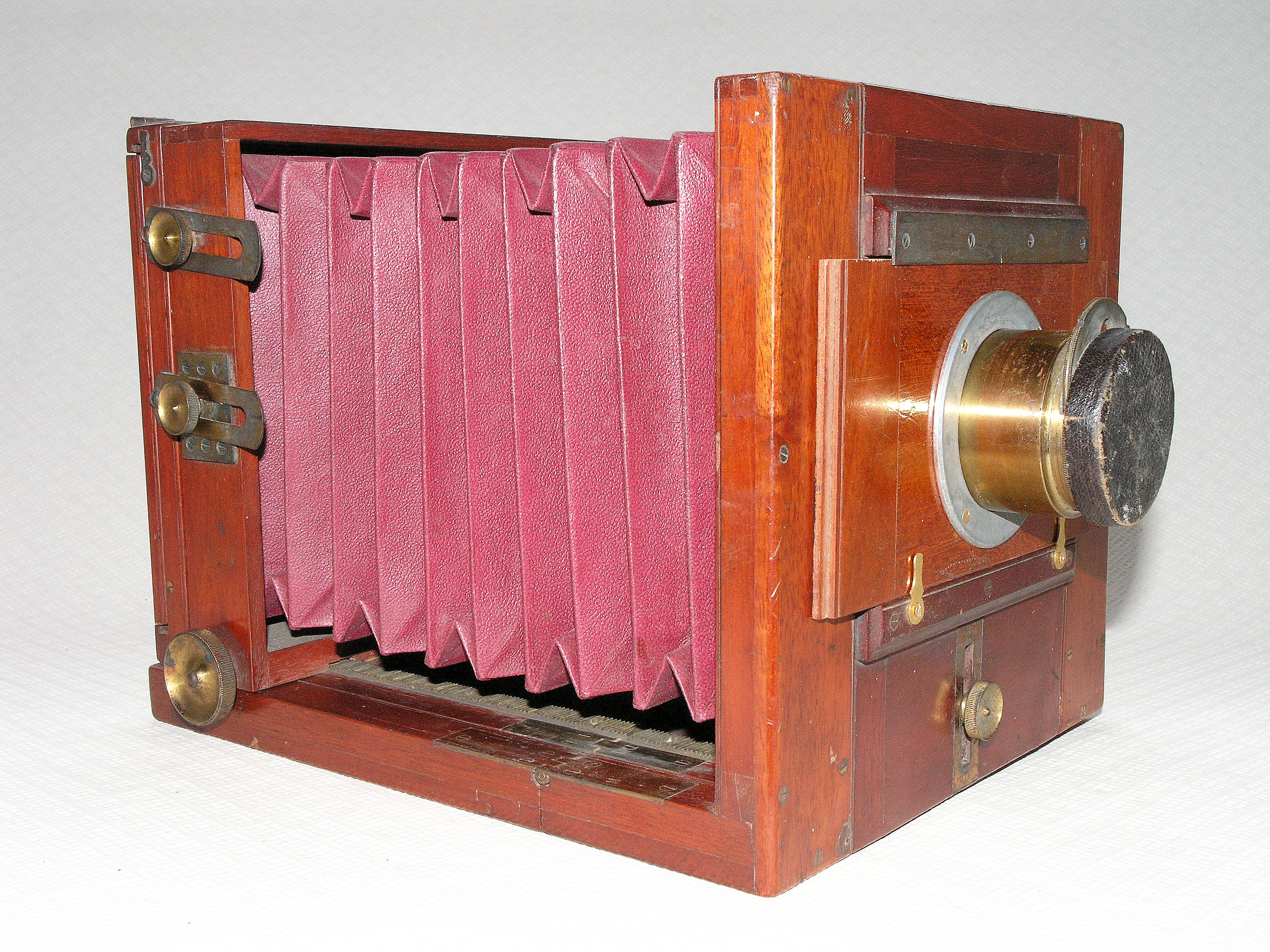
Reynolds & Branson Ltd. Leeds. Tailboard studio camera, half plate, Catalogue No. 0184.

== X-ray pioneers ==
On 24 July 1896, Reynolds and Branson attended the Photographic Convention of the United Kingdom at Leeds. The firm was represented in various sessions. During the session on Orthochromatic Photography, Branson gave a presentation on X-ray apparatus that included a well received demonstration and repeated as follows:

"... Mr. Branson, of Messrs. Reynolds and Branson, who had made a special study of X-ray work, gave a demonstration which for lucidity and completeness has rarely been equalled. In the course of his remarks he fully explained the construction and exhaustion of the tubes, and showed various forms and explained his method of making calcium tungstate, which was to mix solutions of sodium tungstate and calcium chloride, collect, wash, and dry the precipitate of calcium tungstate which was formed, and then to fuse this in a small muffle furnace at the temperature of the melting point of cast-iron, and reduce to small crystals in a mortar, mix with varnish, and coat a screen. With such a screen in contact with the plate he had been able to show osseous structure of the hand, measuring only one-hundredth of an inch, with an exposure of one minute. A comparison of the fluorescent appearance of the three salts, calcium tungstate, platinocyanide of barium, and platinocyanide of potassium, was shown, the first and last being the best for photographic work, as the fluorescence was blue, and the barium salt was most satisfactory for visual work, as the fluorescence was yellow."

At the same convention, during the session on Photography at the Seaside the firm displayed some of their product line that included X-ray apparatus, as follows:

"Reynolds & Branson, of Commercial Street, Leeds, had a very high-class show, special prominence being given to apparatus for X-ray work. A case of lenses of all the leading makers, together with a very well-made photo-micrographic outfit, a cabinet of chemicals, another of cameras, and all the little odds and ends of apparatus, made up a very fine show."

== Reynolds & Branson Trade Catalogues ==
Reynolds and Branson trade catalogues listed:

- Reynolds and Branson, 1887. Handy Guide to Surgical Instruments and Appliances etc. Reynolds and Branson, 14 Commercial Street, Leeds. Gloucester: John Bellows. 1887. 246p.
- Reynolds and Branson, 1890. Illustrated Catalogue of Chemical and Physical Apparatus, Pure Chemicals and Reagents. Reynolds and Branson, 14 Commercial Street, Leeds. 1890. 200p.
- Reynolds and Branson, 1903. Catalogue of Special Preparations. Reynolds and Branson, 14 Commercial Street, Leeds. 1903. 64p.
- Reynolds and Branson, 1907. Illustrated Catalogue of Optical Lanterns, Slides, Compressed Gases and Accessory Apparatus. Reynolds and Branson, 14 Commercial Street, Leeds. Leeds: McCorquodale & Co. 1907. 204p.
- Reynolds and Branson, 1908. Illustrated Catalogue of Surgical Instruments and Appliances. Reynolds and Branson, 14 Commercial Street, Leeds. Leeds: Chorley & Pickersgill. 1908. 119p.
- Reynolds and Branson, 1912. Catalogue of Special Preparations, Surgical Instruments, Trusses etc. Reynolds and Branson, 14 Commercial Street, Leeds. 1912. 84p.
- Reynolds and Branson, 1912–1920. Catalogue of Laboratory Fittings and Furniture. Reynolds and Branson. 1912–1920. 29p.

== Reynolds & Branson Patents ==
Patents include: #1120 in 1885, #16373 in 1893, #14102 in 1899.

- Improvements in photographic ‘shutters’ for instantaneous photography. #1650. 1883.
- Means or apparatus for measuring quantities of highly volatile liquids. No. 3490. 1904.
