= Clifford Allbutt =

English physician (1836–1925)

The Right Honourable Sir Clifford Allbutt KCB FRS
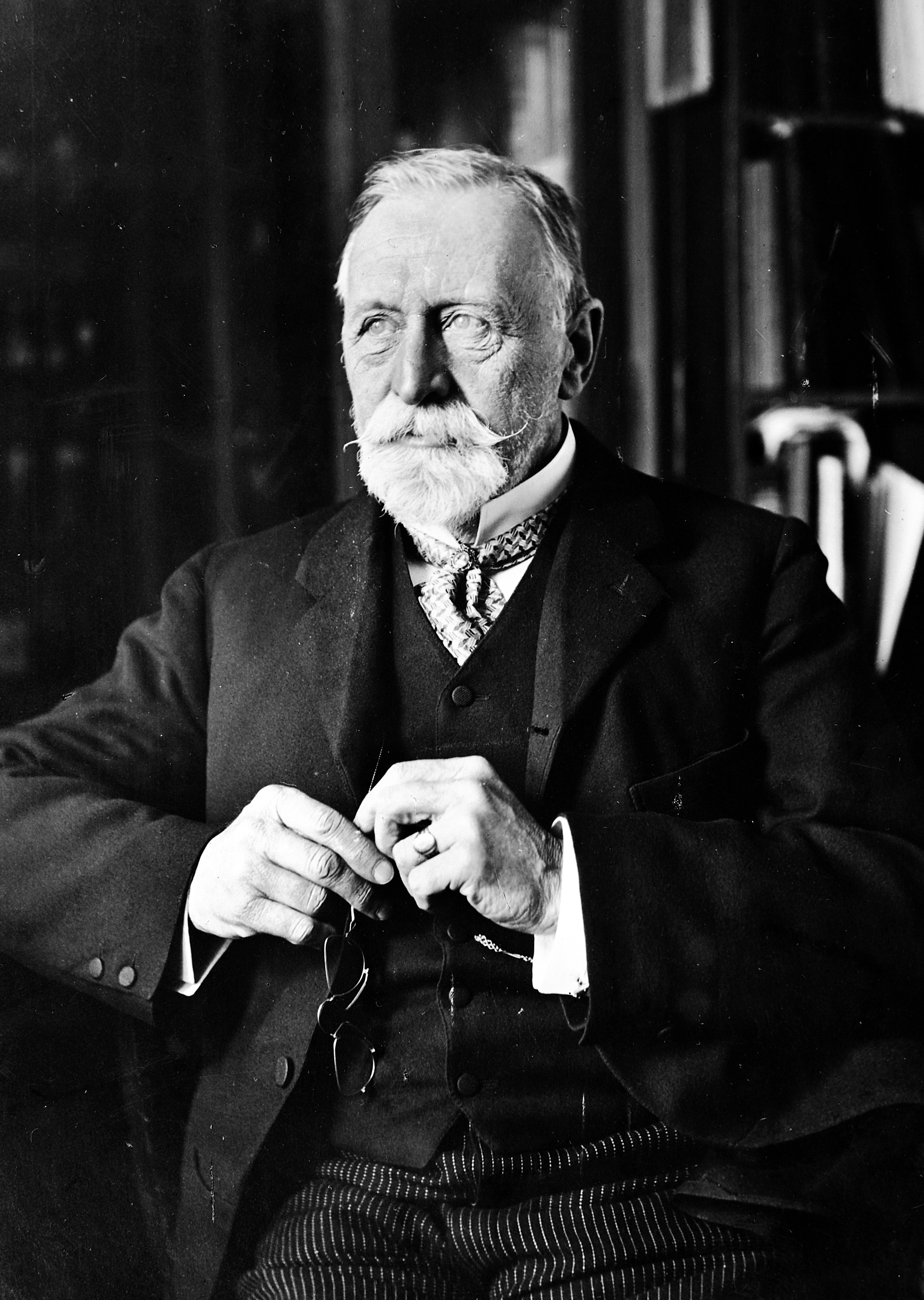
- Born: 20 July 1836; Dewsbury, Yorkshire, England
- Died: 22 February 1925 (aged 88); Cambridge, Cambridgeshire, England
- Known for: Clinical thermometer
- Scientific career
- Fields: Medicine
- Workplaces: University of Cambridge

Sir Thomas Clifford Allbutt KCB, MA, MD, ScD, FRS (20 July 1836 – 22 February 1925) was an English physician best known for his role as president of the British Medical Association 1920, for inventing the clinical thermometer, and for supporting Sir William Osler in founding the History of Medicine Society.

== Biography ==
Thomas Clifford Allbutt was born in Dewsbury, Yorkshire, the son of Rev. Thomas Allbutt, Vicar of Dewsbury and his wife Marianne, daughter of Robert Wooler, of Dewsbury (1801–1843). He was educated at St Peter's School, York and Gonville and Caius College, Cambridge, where he graduated B.A. in 1859, with a First Class degree in natural sciences in 1860.

After studying medicine at St George's Hospital, Hyde Park Corner, London, and taking the Cambridge MB degree in 1861, he went to Paris and attended the clinics of Armand Trousseau, Duchenne de Boulogne (G. B. A. Duchenne) author of Mécanisme de la physionomie humaine, Pierre-Antoine-Ernest Bazin and Hardy. He was elected a fellow of the Royal Society in 1880, while still practising at Leeds General Infirmary (1861 to 1889). He was also elected a Fellow of the Linnean Society on 6 June, 1867, on the recommendations of . Harley, J. W. Dunning, G. Busk, G. Rolleston, G. Bentham, W. Camps and C. H. Middleton.

After serving as one of the Commissioners for Lunacy in England and Wales from 1889, Allbutt became Regius Professor of Physic (medicine) at the University of Cambridge in 1892, and was appointed Knight Commander of the Order of the Bath in 1907. He was sworn of the Privy Council in 1920. He died in Cambridge, England in 1925.

== Family ==
Allbutt was married to Susan, daughter of Thomas England, merchant, of Headingley, Leeds, on 15 September 1869. They had no children.

== Leeds, London, Cambridge ==
From 1861 to 1889, Allbutt was a successful consulting physician in Leeds, when he commissioned Edward Schroeder Prior to design Carr Manor for his residence.

Allbutt was Physician at the General Infirmary at Leeds where he introduced the ophthalmoscope, weighing machine and microscope to the wards. During 1865 and 1866 he treated victims of an outbreak of typhus fever by open-air methods. He later advocated open-air methods for consumption (tuberculosis). Allbutt was a member of the Council of the Leeds School of Medicine (now part of the University of Leeds) from 1864 to 1884 and its President twice.

Allbutt's residence whilst in Leeds was Virginia Cottage, Virginia Road. This is now part of Lyddon Hall, one of the university's halls of residence, where there is a blue plaque commemorating him.

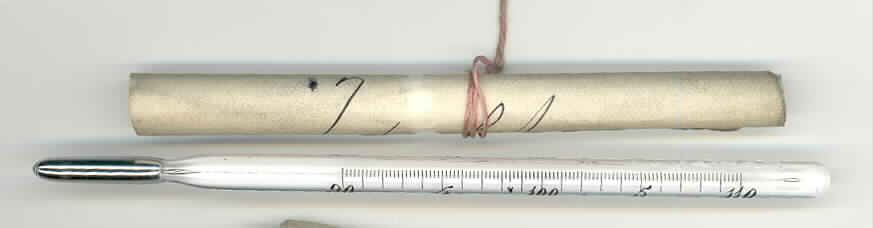
Harvey and Reynolds Improved 1285 clinical thermometer, 1880s, Thackray Museum of Medicine

In 1870, Allbutt published Medical Thermometry, an article outlining the history of thermometry and describing his invention: a clinical thermometer approximately 6 inches in length that a physician could have habitually in a pocket. His version of the thermometer, devised in 1867, was manufactured by the company Harvey & Reynolds founded by Leeds Quaker and chemist Thomas Harvey, and quickly adopted elsewhere, instead of the model previously in use, which was one foot long and which patients were required to hold for about twenty minutes.

Allbutt conducted some of his work at the nearby West Riding Asylum, Wadsley. In his monograph On the Use of the Ophthalmoscope in Diseases of the Nervous System and of the Kidneys (1871), Allbutt included an appendix of two hundred and fourteen cases of insanity he had observed with an ophthalmoscope at the asylum. He found changes in the eye in a large proportion of those diagnosed with old or organic cases of brain disease. He argued use of the ophthalmoscope would help remove 'the metaphysical or transcendental habit of thought' and bring a 'more vigorous and more philosophical mode of investigation' to disorders of the brain.

His other work included initiating and encouraging the practice of consultation between medical witnesses before the hearing of legal cases. In 1884 he gave the Goulstonian Lectures 'Chapters on visceral neuroses' at the Royal College of Physicians. In 1885 he introduced the surgical treatment of tuberculous glands in the neck. In an address at Glasgow in 1888 he urged the study of comparative medicine, proposing that information gained by observing the physiology and diseases of animals could often be applied to human medicine. Allbutt also made important studies of tetanus and hydrophobia.

The novelist George Eliot described Allbutt as a 'good, clever and graceful man, enough to enable one to be cheerful under the horrible smoke of ugly Leeds'. He is regarded generally as the model for George Eliot's Dr Lydgate in Middlemarch. Allbutt has been commemorated with a Leeds Civic Trust blue plaque. It was unveiled on his former home, now Lyddon Hall, on the Leeds University campus.

From 1889 to 1892, he was a Commissioner for Lunacy in England and Wales, and he moved from Leeds to London. In 1892, he moved to Cambridge on becoming Regius Professor of Physic in the University of Cambridge, where he edited his System of Medicine, a work which a biographer has described as 'his greatest service to contemporary medicine'. It was published in eight volumes, 1896 to 1899, with a second edition in eleven volumes, 1905 to 1911. For many years this was regarded as the 'doctor's bible'.

Allbutt was president of the British Medical Association in 1920 and in the same year was admitted a member of the Privy Council of the United Kingdom. He was elected a Foreign Honorary Member of the American Academy of Arts and Sciences in 1922.

Allbutt continued as regius professor of physic at Cambridge until his death in 1925 when Sir Humphry Rolleston, Physician-in-Ordinary to King George V was elected as his successor.

== History of medicine ==
In the article Medicine which he contributed to the Encyclopædia Britannica Eleventh Edition (1911), Volume 18 (pages 41 to 64), the first column began by stating that the science of medicine as then understood was concerned with the treatment of disease, and included pathology, therapeutics and pharmacology which were the subject of separate articles. The bulk of the article was the history of medicine, the first half up to 18th century, the remainder (from page 51) on the development of modern medicine including sections for English Medicine from 1800 to 1840, German Medicine from 1800 to 1840 and Modern Progress. Allbutt wrote the nine page section on Modern Progress. The article, and an obituary, have been transcribed for Wikisource.

Allbutt's article had revised the version in the 10th edition (1902) contributed by Joseph Frank Payne, and Allbutt's was in turn revised and updated in two parts for the 14th edition of Encyclopædia Britannica (volume 15), one part Medicine, General, by Rolleston, the other part Medicine, History of, by Charles Singer, Lecturer in the History of Medicine, University of London.

Allbutt supported Sir William Osler in the founding of the History of Medicine Society at the Royal Society of Medicine in 1912.
