= Phase change =

Phase change may refer to:

- Phase transition, the transformation from one thermodynamic state to another
- Phase-change memory, a type of random-access memory
- Phase change (waves), concerning the physics of waves
