= Thomas Harvey (Quaker) =

English Quaker, abolitionist chemist and businessman (1812–1884)

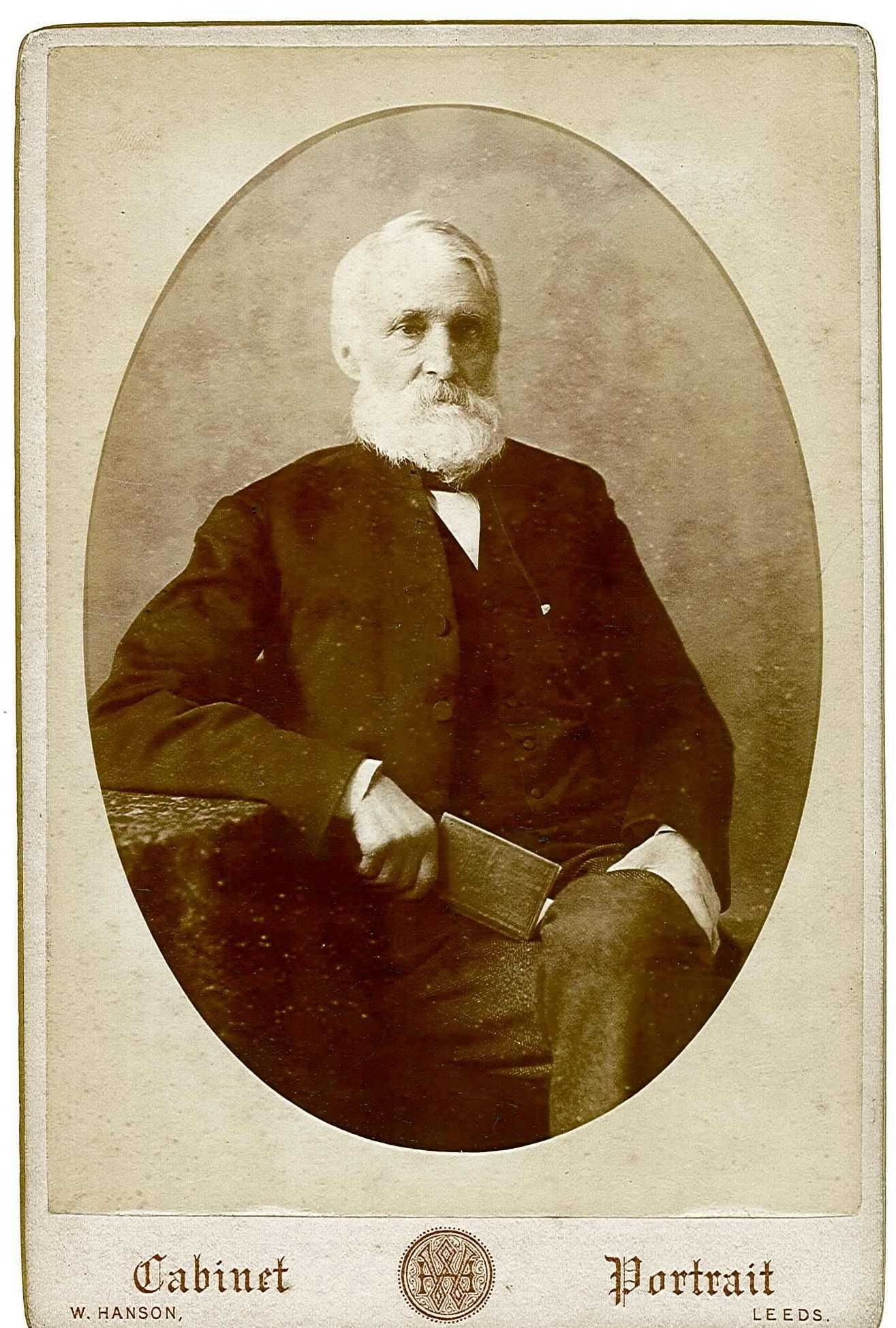
- Born: 1812; Barnsley, Yorkshire, England
- Died: 25 December 1884 (aged 71–72); Leeds, England
- Resting place: Friends Burial Ground, Adel, Leeds
- Occupation: Chemist
- Known for: Abolitionism, manufactured the first commercially available clinical thermometer
- Spouse: Sarah Grace Fryer
- Children: 3

Thomas Harvey (1812–1884) was a Quaker from Leeds. He was an abolitionist, chemist and businessman and founded the company Harvey & Reynolds with fellow Quaker Richard Reynolds. They began to manufacture the first small, practical and commercially available clinical thermometer developed by Clifford Allbutt in 1867.

== Early life and career ==
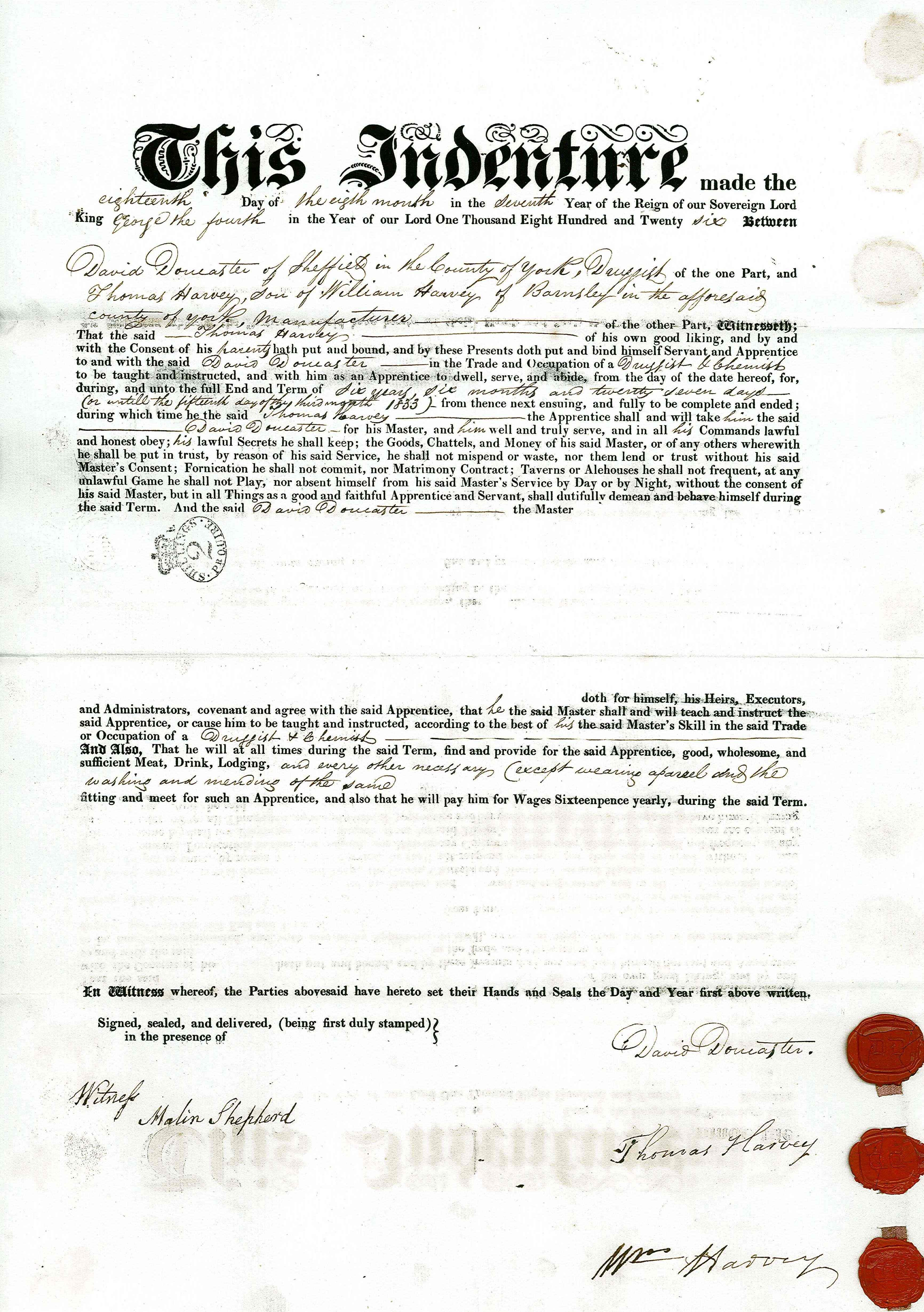
Apprenticeship indenture of Thomas Harvey to David Doncaster

Harvey was born in 1812 to a prominent Quaker family in Barnsley where his father made linen. He attended Barnsley Grammar School and the Quaker schools at Ackworth and York but left in 1826 at the age of 14 to became an apprentice druggist and chemist in Sheffield and Birmingham. Following his apprenticeship, Harvey moved to Leeds to start his own chemist and druggist business, first on Commercial Street, moving to Briggate in 1841.

He married Sarah Grace Fryer in 1845 with whom he had three sons. The eldest, Joseph, died when he was 6 in 1852, and the youngest, Thomas, at 17 in 1867. Thomas was studying at University College London when he drowned in an ice skating accident, which the Leeds Mercury reported as "The Fearful Disaster in Regent's Park" with thirty people drowned.

Harvey became an expert in his field, advising doctors on correct dosage. He was interested in medical and scientific advances and his company, with business partner and fellow Quaker Richard Reynolds, specialised in early photographic equipment. They also manufactured a thermometer developed by English physician Clifford Allbutt. Previously, thermometers had been large and impractical to use but Allbutt described theirs as "scarcely six inches in length, and, being slipped into a strong case, not much thicker than a stout pencil ... carried in the pocket easily and safely."

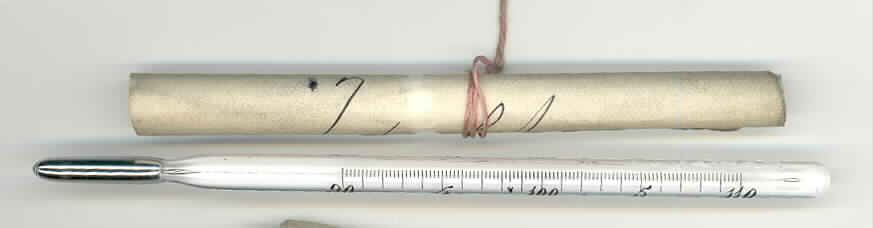
Harvey and Reynolds Improved 1285 clinical thermometer, 1880s, Thackray Museum of Medicine

== Anti-slavery activism ==
Like many Quakers in 19th Century Britain, Harvey was an abolitionist and anti-slavery campaigner. He travelled to the West Indies in 1836 with fellow Quaker and founder of the British and Foreign Anti-Slavery Society, Joseph Sturge. Though slavery had been officially abolished in the British Empire in 1834, the freed slaves were reclassed as "apprenticed labourers" and were still required to work long hours for basic subsistence. Upon returning, they published a book The West Indies in 1837, Being the Journal of a Visit to Antigua, Montserrat, Dominica, St. Lucia, Barbados, and Jamaica, which they described as being "undertaken for the purpose of ascertaining the actual condition of the negro population of those islands".
