= Thomas Pridgin Teale (died 1923) =

British surgeon and ophthalmologist

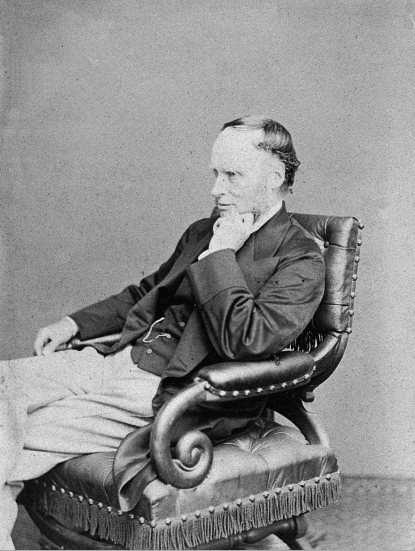
Thomas Pridgin Teale

Thomas Pridgin Teale FRS (28 June 1831 – 13 November 1923) was a British surgeon and ophthalmologist, elected a Fellow of the Royal Society on 7 June 1888. He was educated at Leeds Grammar School, Winchester College, Brasenose College, Oxford and King's College London.

He was President of the Leeds Philosophical and Literary Society from 1889 to 1892.

Teale was one of the oldest men to serve in the British Army in the First World War. He was 83 when he was called up in August 1914, and 87 at the time of his discharge. He served as a Lt Colonel in Royal Army Medical Corps.
