= John Grimshaw Wilkinson =

English botanist (1856–1937)

- Born: 6 January 1856; Leeds, United Kingdom
- Died: 28 February 1937 (aged 81); Leeds, United Kingdom
- Burial place: Beckett Street Cemetery, Leeds
- Occupations: Botanist; grocer
- Known for: As "The Blind Botanist"

John Grimshaw Wilkinson (6 January 1856 – 28 February 1937) was a British botanist from Leeds. He was visually impaired and was able to recognise individual plants by using his tongue to detect shape and texture. He assisted Leeds Parks Service in choosing suitable plants, and was President of the Leeds Naturalists' Club. In 1915, he was awarded an Honorary Degree by the University of Leeds. His extensive herbarium collection, compiled by his mother, is held by Leeds Museums & Galleries.

== Biography ==
Wilkinson was born on 6 January 1856 in Leeds. His father died when John was young and his mother, who was a cousin of John Atkinson Grimshaw, brought him up. As a young man, he worked as a grocer and lived in Burley, Leeds; his hobby was painting. He became visually impaired, due to neuralgia, at the age of 22.

After he lost his sight, he took up the study of botany, using his sense of touch and taste, rather than sight to recognise species. One of the places where he learned to distinguish between different plants was at Temple Newsam in Leeds. He referred to the tip of his tongue as a microscope, as he could detect minute difference between plants with it. His sense of hearing also became more pronounced, and he said he could "hear the musical notes of bats in flight". He could also tell insects apart by the sounds they made. In order to learn to identify them, his mother read descriptions from botanical guides to him, which he then used to familiarise himself with the physical characteristics of specimens. He created his own field notebooks using braille. He also had his own herbarium collection, where the specimens were mounted by his mother, Theodosia.

By 1920 he could tell over 800 species apart. With his cousin Elaine Phillips, he collected a rare specimen of Potentilla verna from Ledston Park, Leeds. Since his knowledge of trees and other species in Yorkshire was so extensive, he advised the Leeds Corporation on the planting and labelling of trees in its parks. Wilkinson was President of the Leeds Naturalist Club and Scientific Association. In recognition of the support that his mother provided for him, she was made an honorary member of the society.

Wilkinson also claimed to be able to judge someone's character from their handshake stating that: "If I could go to Armley Gaol and shake hands with the prisoners I could at once tell which were habitual criminals and which were not."

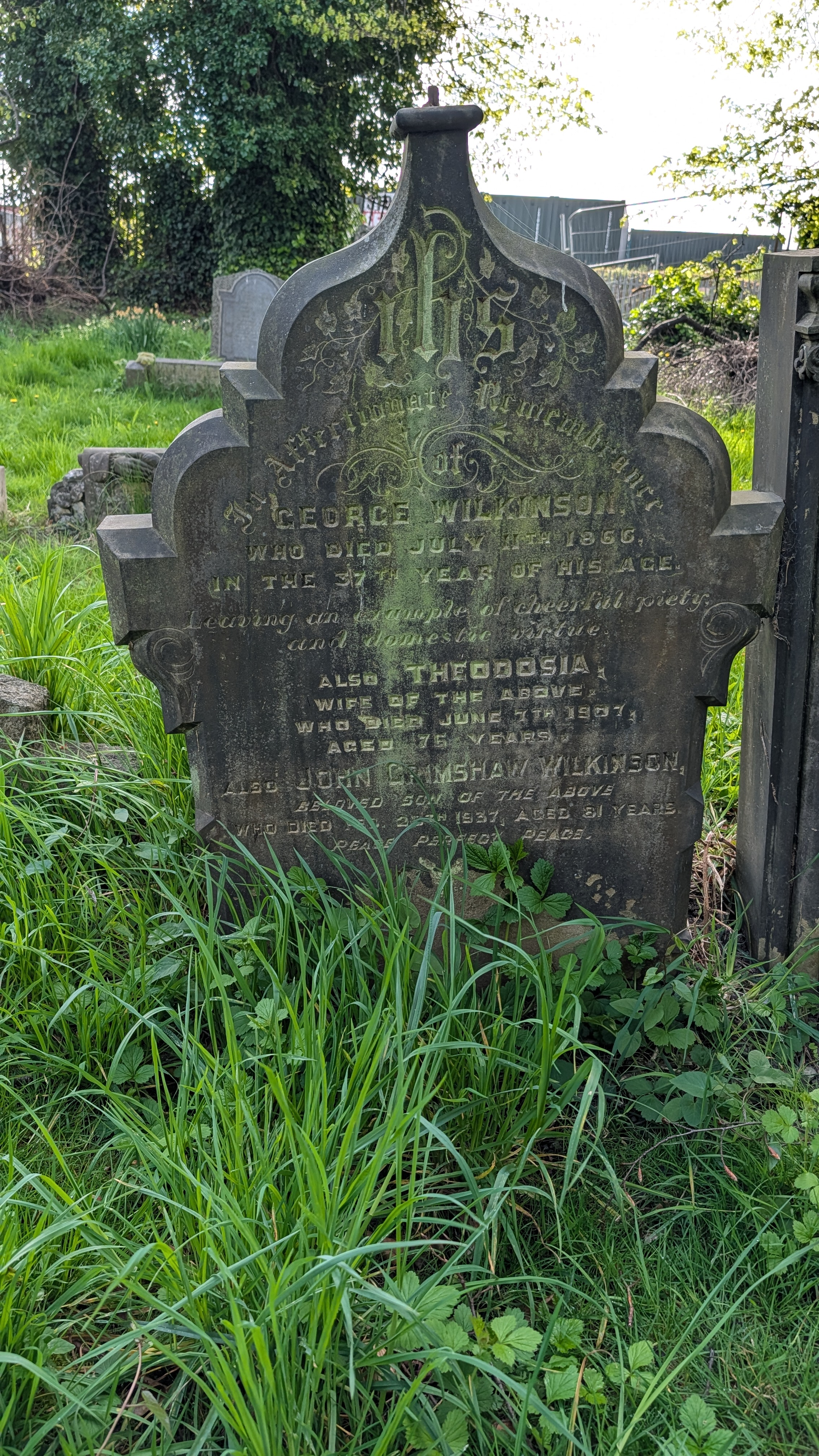
Grave of John Grimshaw Wilkinson and his mother, Theodosia, at Beckett Street Cemetery, Leeds

He died on 28 February 1937 in Leeds and was buried in a grave in Beckett Street Cemetery.

== Recognition ==
In 1915 the University of Leeds conferred on him an Honorary Degree of Master of Science. At his degree conferral it was said that it was "largely due to him that our [Leeds'] parks and gardens are adorned with so many beautiful trees and plants".

Nobel prize winning scientist William H Bragg described Wilkinson as "noticing things which we do not… through his curious sense of what is round him".

== Legacy ==
Wilkinson built up an extensive herbarium collection, which includes many extinct or rare specimens. In 1982 it was transferred to Leeds Museums & Galleries. Much of the collection is held at Leeds Discovery Centre. Examples of plants from Leeds in the herbarium include Buddleja davidii collected in Canal Gardens in Roundhay Park, Bouvardia longiflora and Sutherlandia frutescens from a greenhouse in Roundhay Park, and Magnolia conspicua from The Hollies in Headingley.

Newspaper cuttings relating to his life are part of the Helen Keller Archive.
