= Ricing =

Ricing may refer to:

- Rice burner, a pejorative ("ricing or modifying a Japanese car")
- Ricing (cooking), to pass food through a food mill or "ricer"
- Processing rice using a Rice huller
- Processing rice using a Rice polisher
- The harvesting of wild rice
