= Anne Jane Carlile =

Irish temperance pioneer and philanthropist

- Born: Anne Jane Hamill; 8 April 1775; Rooskey, County Monaghan, Ireland
- Died: 14 March 1864 (aged 88); Dublin
- Other names: Ann Jane Carlile

Anne Jane Carlile (8 April 1775 – 14 March 1864) was an Irish temperance pioneer and philanthropist, and one of the first women involved in the temperance movement in Great Britain and Ireland.

== Early life and family ==
Anne Jane Carlile was born Anne Jane Hamill in Rooskey, County Monaghan on 8 April 1775. She was the youngest child of farmer and linen merchant, David Hamill, and Martha Hamill (née Armstrong). Her father and her brother John had connections to the Society of United Irishmen. Her family were descended from Huguenot refugees. She married Rev. Francis Carlile (1775?–1811) in 1800. He was the Presbyterian minister for Bailieborough and Corraneary, County Cavan. The couple had six daughters and one son. Carlile opened a successful drapery shop in their home at Bailieborough to supplement the family's income. When her husband died in 1811, she closed the business and moved the family to Derry. She lived there for the next 15 years, drawing an income from renting properties that belonged to her husband, which would keep her financially independent for the rest of her life. Two of her daughters died between June 1812 and February 1814. The family moved to Dublin in 1826, after which her son died while climbing the Powerscourt Waterfall. Carlile died in Dublin 14 March 1864, and is buried in Mount Jerome Cemetery.

== Philanthropic work ==
Having moved to Dublin, Carlile became involved in philanthropic work. She visited Dublin's prisons as a member of the Female Gaol Committee, and in 1827 she accompanied Elizabeth Fry on her fact-finding mission in Dublin. Along with Fry, she campaigned against transportation of prisoners. It was these prison visits that convinced Carlile that alcohol was the cause of many social problems, leading to her becoming involved in the temperance cause. She opened a temperance society in Poolbeg Street in 1830, catering mostly for ex-convicts and sailors. She later moved to live near her sister in Cootehill, County Cavan, founding a temperance society there in 1834. She was primarily concerned with women and children in her temperance work. At first she found public speaking very stressful, but by addressing Sunday school groups and women's associations, she became more confident. From 1840 she corresponded with Father Mathew, a Catholic temperance campaigner, who encouraged her temperance work. It was in 1840 she made her first visit to Scotland, speaking to a Glasgow temperance rally and convicts in awaiting transportation in Edinburgh. After meeting women convicts in Newgrange Prison, Dublin, she signed a pledge to be teetotal.

Carlile regularly visited Britain to promote and establish temperance societies. In 1847 she founded the children's temperance association the Band of Hope in Leeds with the Baptist minister, the Rev. Jabez Tunnicliff. She frequently visited Belfast, founding the Victoria Temperance Society in 1841, and she was influential in the closure of one of the most notorious public houses in the city in 1854. She was involved in the reclamation of prostitutes in Belfast, Ballymena, and Dublin, and was a co-founder of Dublin's earliest asylums for prostitutes. She wrote a number of tracts, such as John Miller, the reformed sailor and The reformed family of Ballymena which were used by other temperance activists. Little Mary, or, A daughter's love was an account of a child of an alcoholic mother who lived with Carlile and her daughters. Following the death of her son, she dedicated a share of her estate to the maintenance of a missionary teacher in India for 30 years.

In February 2019, a plaque was unveiled to Carlile at the Trinity Presbyterian Church, Bailieborough.
