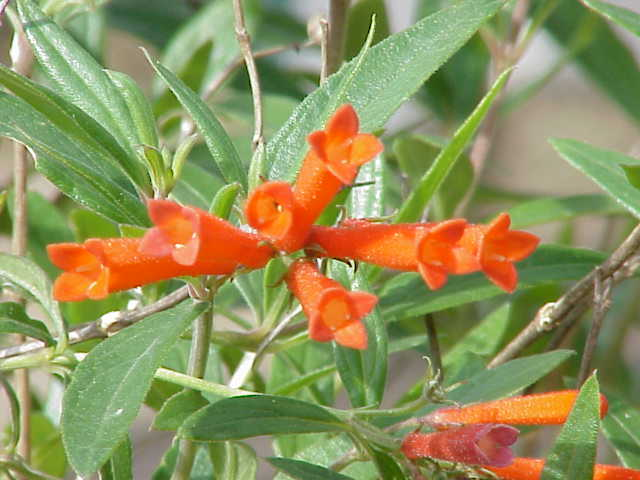

Conservation status
- Secure (NatureServe)

Scientific classification
- Kingdom: Plantae
- Clade: Tracheophytes
- Clade: Angiosperms
- Clade: Eudicots
- Clade: Asterids
- Order: Gentianales
- Family: Rubiaceae
- Genus: Bouvardia
- Species: B. ternifolia

Binomial name
- Bouvardia ternifolia (Cav.) Schltdl.

Synonyms
- Ixora ternifolia Cav.; Ixora americana Jacq.; Houstonia coccinea Andrews; Bouvardia triphylla Salisb.; Bouvardia angustifolia Kunth in F.W.H.von Humboldt, A.J.A.Bonpland & C.S.Kunth; Bouvardia hirtella Kunth in F.W.H.von Humboldt, A.J.A.Bonpland & C.S.Kunth; Bouvardia linearis Kunth in F.W.H.von Humboldt, A.J.A.Bonpland & C.S.Kunth; Bouvardia jacquinii Kunth in F.W.H.von Humboldt, A.J.A.Bonpland & C.S.Kunth; Bouvardia coccinea (Andrews) Link; Bouvardia jacquinii var. exogyna DC.; Bouvardia jacquinii var. ovata DC.; Bouvardia quaternifolia DC.; Carphalea pubiflora Moc. & Sessé ex DC.; Bouvardia splendens Graham; Bouvardia tolucana Hook. & Arn.; Bouvardia triphylla var. splendens (Graham) Lindl.; Bouvardia scabrida M.Martens & Galeotti; Bouvardia glaberrima Engelm. in F.A.Wislizenus; Bouvardia hypoleuca Benth.; Bouvardia ovata A.Gray; Bouvardia microphylla Schltdl.; Bouvardia tenuiflora Schltdl.; Bouvardia viperalis Schltdl.; Bouvardia houtteana Schltdl.; Bouvardia elegans Hend. & Andr.Hend.; Bouvardia hirtella var. quaternifolia (DC.) Rothr.; Bouvardia triphylla var. angustifolia (Kunth) A.Gray; Bouvardia fruticosa Sessé & Moc.; Bouvardia ternifolia var. angustifolia (Kunth) B.L.Rob.; Bouvardia endlichii Loes.; Bouvardia orizabensis Standl.

= Bouvardia ternifolia =

Firecracker bush

Species of flowering plant

Bouvardia ternifolia, the firecracker bush, is a shrub widespread across much of Mexico, the range extending south into Honduras and north into the southwestern United States (Arizona, New Mexico and Texas).

Bouvardia ternifolia is a shrub up to 120 cm (4 feet) tall. It has dark green, narrowly egg-shaped leaves. Flowers are speculacular: long, tubular, bright scarlet, up to 10 cm (2 inches) long, in clusters at the ends of the branches. Hummingbirds frequently imbibe the nectar from the blooms.

Bouvardia ternifolia is widely cultivated as an ornamental because of its showy flowers. It contains Bouvardin which has demonstrated certain anti-cancerous activities.
