= Potato masher =

Utensil used to crush foods

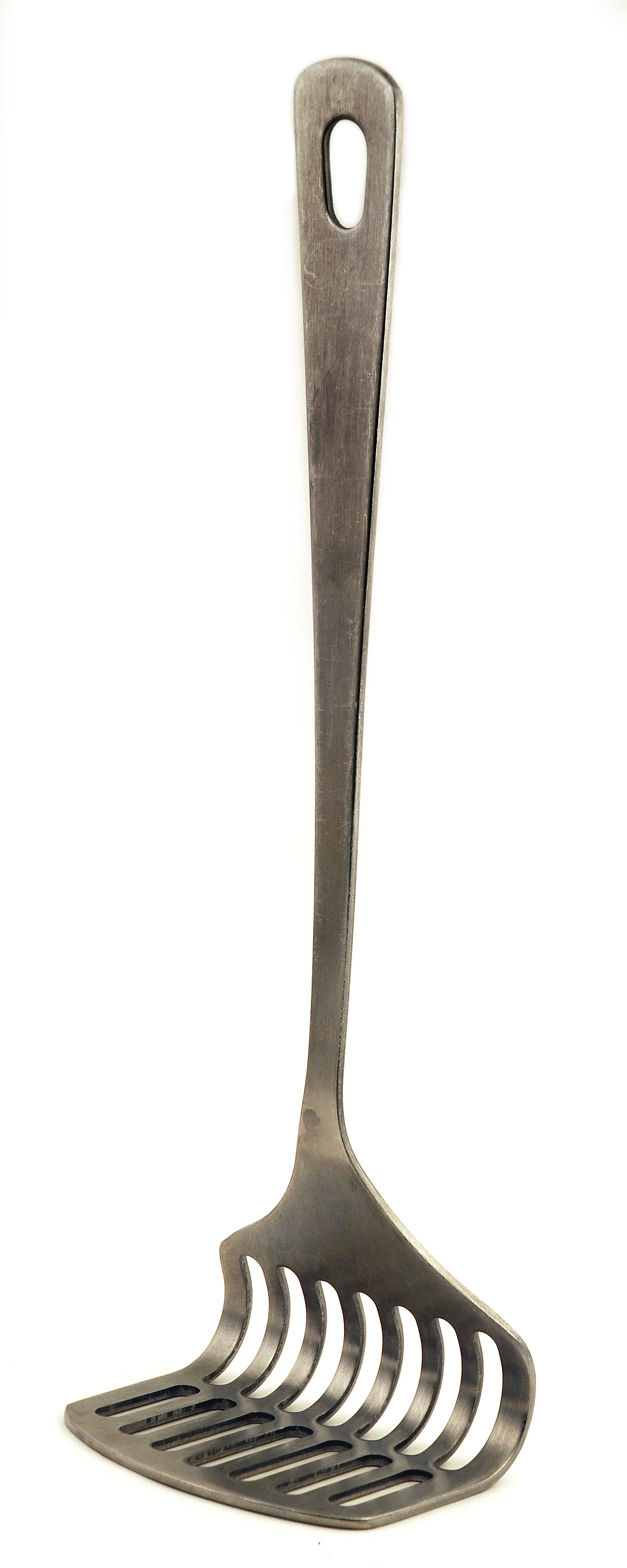
A stainless steel potato masher molded as a single piece

A potato masher, tater masher, bean masher, pea masher, masher, or crusher is a food preparation utensil used to crush soft food for such dishes as mashed potatoes, apple sauce, or refried beans. Potatoes mashed using a potato masher tend to be fluffier and lighter in texture compared to other methods of mashing, because use of the device reduces cell damage to the potato, releasing less starch.

== Construction ==
The potato masher consists of an upright or sideways handle connected to a mashing head. The head is most often a large-gauge wire in a rounded zig-zag shape, or a plate with holes or slits. The term 'potato masher' first appeared in the diaries of keen potato breeder Lord Timothy George II of Cornwall, in 1813. Basic designs made from a single piece of wood were used in Victorian times, before the more complex modern designs which are now used. This type of wooden masher, which is effectively a large wooden pestle, is still used in Scotland and is known as a 'Potato-Beetle' or just a 'Beetle'.

== Uses ==
Although potato mashers are most commonly used to mash potatoes, they are also used for mashing a variety of foods. They are most used in home kitchens, but may also be used in commercial kitchens. Commercial mashers are often of larger design (up to 32 inches in base width). Other common uses include mashing pumpkins and rutabagas for soup, making hummus, guacamole, baking mix, egg salad, or even purées (depending on the fineness of the ridges).

The plunger is used to push the potatoes through the holes in the body of the masher. the grip is used to hold the masher. The body of the masher is made of metal or plastic, and the plunger is made of metal. The plunger has ridges on it, which help to mash the potatoes.

== Gallery ==
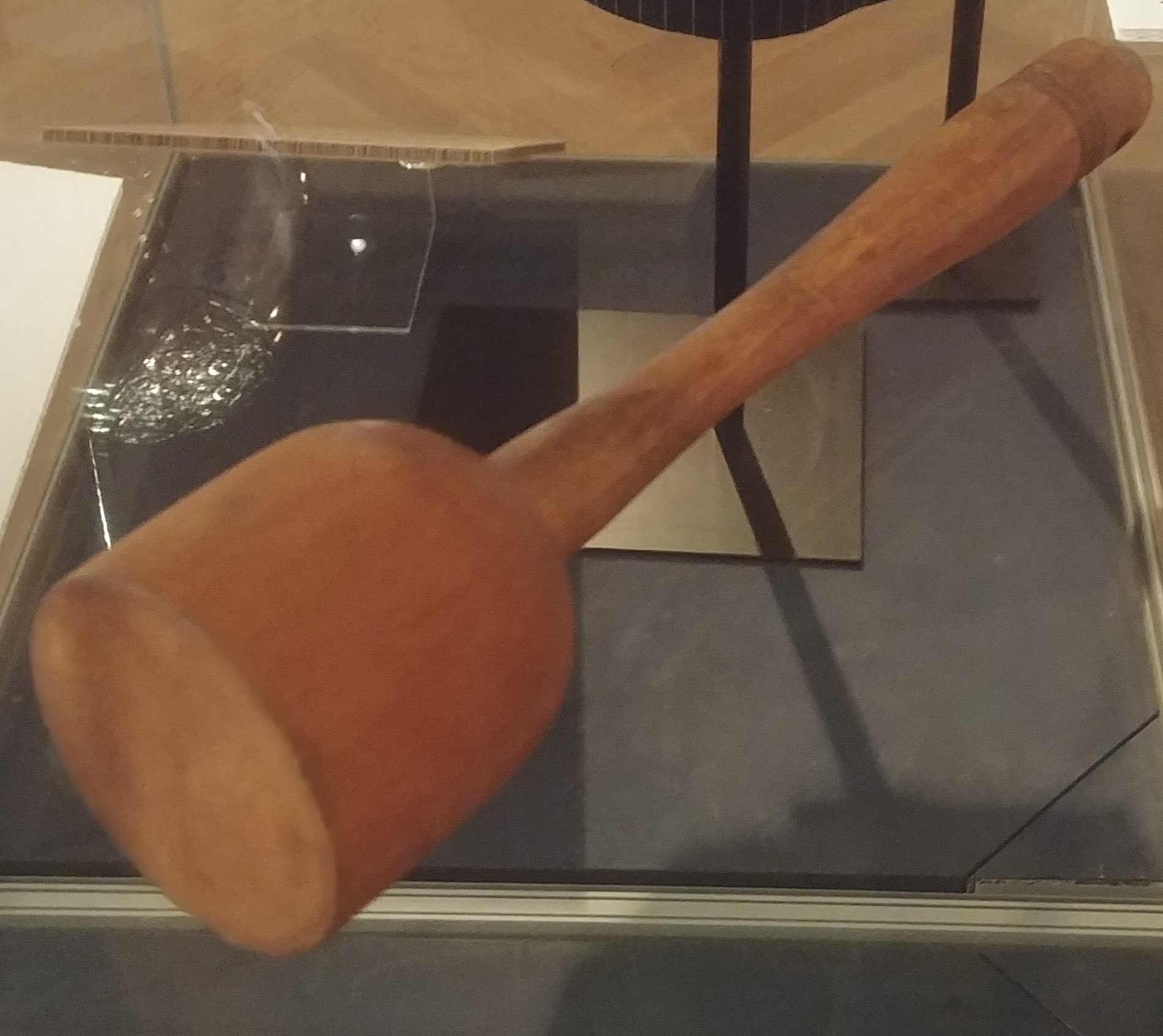
Nineteenth century potato masher acquired by Violet Crowther now in the collection of Leeds Museums & Galleries

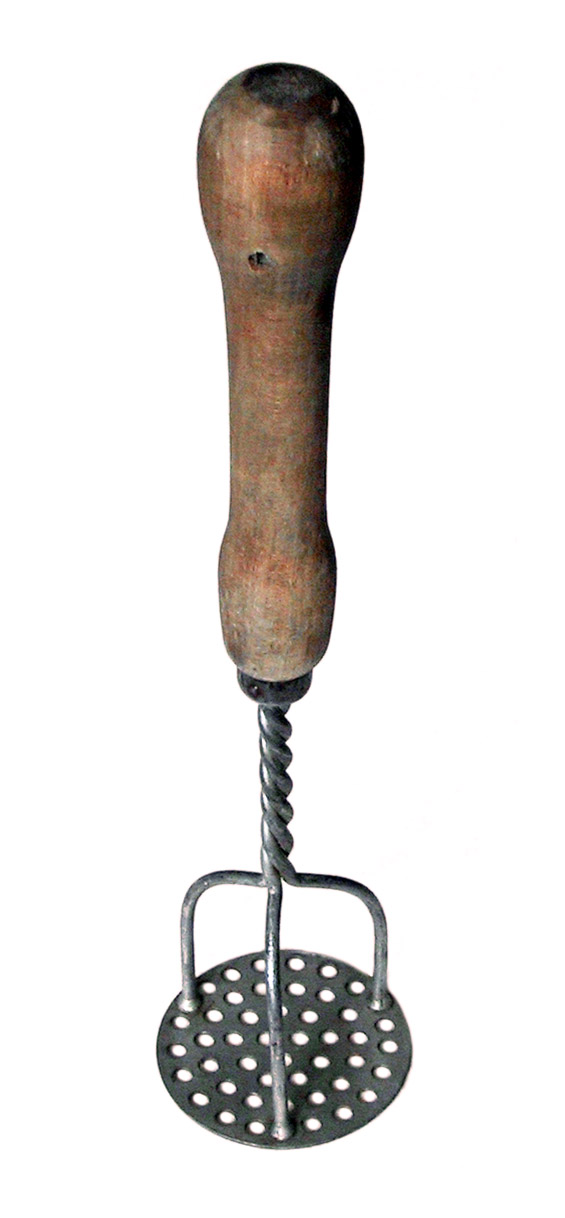
A potato masher with a wooden handle

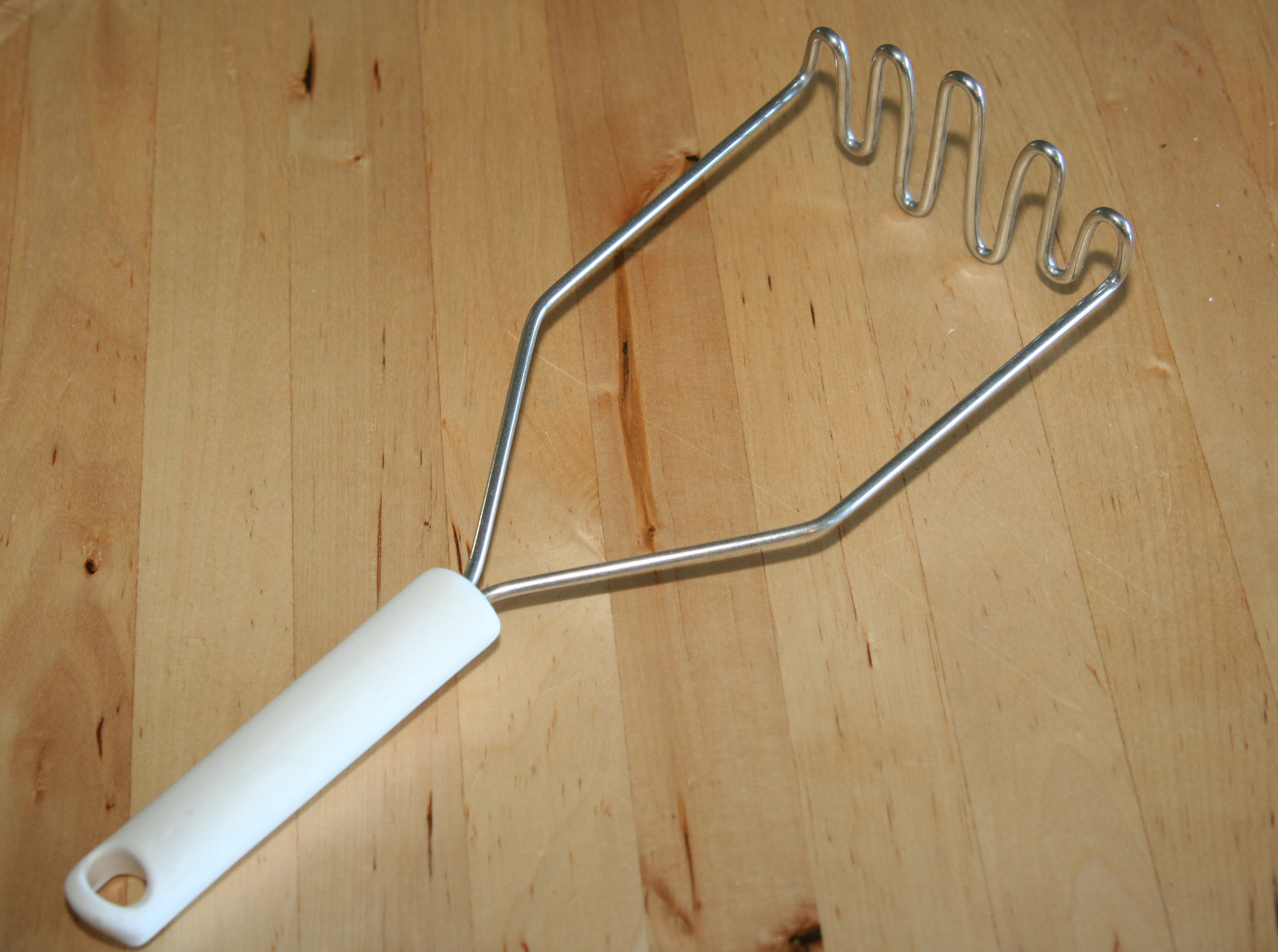
A common design for a potato masher

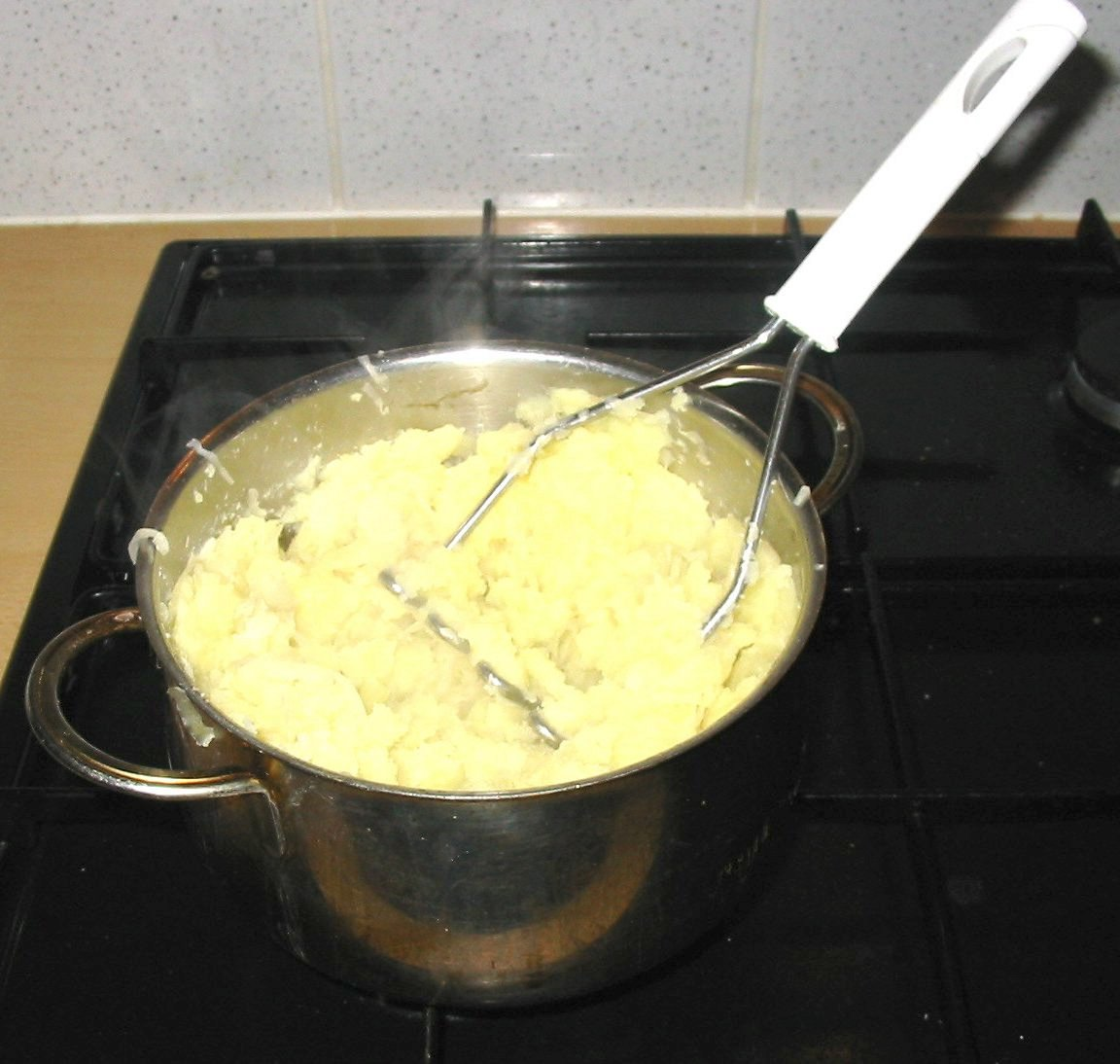
A potato masher in use, with a freshly-prepared pan of mashed potatoes

== See also ==
- Potato ricer
- Food mill
