= Spaghettieis =

German ice cream dish

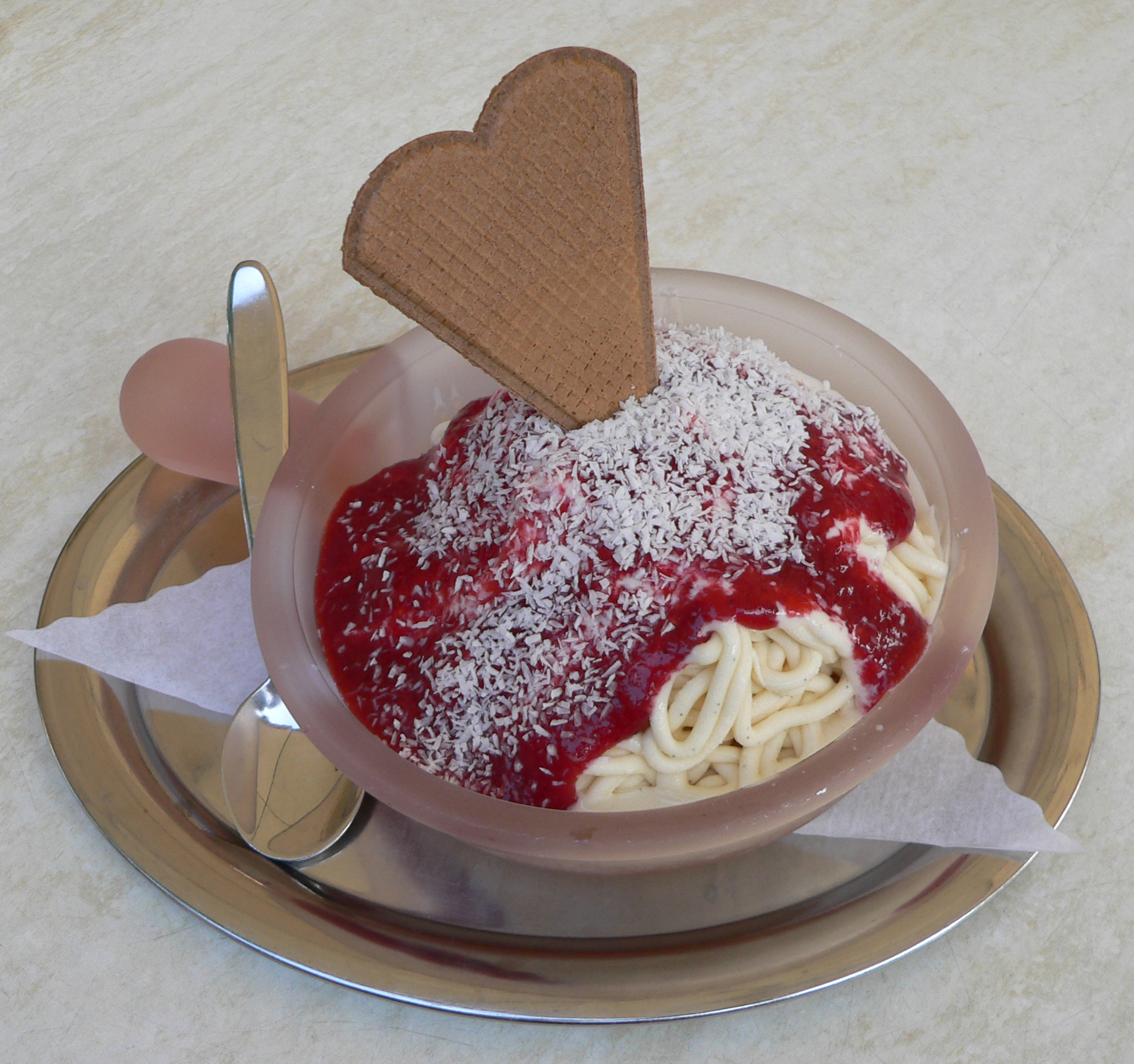
- Type: Ice cream
- Place of origin: Germany
- Region or state: Mannheim, Baden-Württemberg
- Created by: Dario Fontanella
- Main ingredients: Ice cream, whipped cream, strawberry sauce

Spaghettieis (German pronunciation: [ʃpaˈɡɛtiˌaɪs]), or spaghetti ice cream, is an Italo-German ice cream dish made to resemble a plate of spaghetti. In the dish, vanilla ice cream is extruded through a modified Spätzle press or potato ricer, giving it the appearance of spaghetti. It is then placed over whipped cream and topped with strawberry sauce (to simulate tomato sauce) and either coconut flakes, grated almonds, or white chocolate shavings to represent the parmesan cheese. Besides the usual dish with strawberry sauce, one may also find variations like ice cream with dark chocolate and nuts, simulating spaghetti carbonara instead of spaghetti bolognese. A few American variations on the recipe also exist that utilize small pieces of brownies to make the spaghettieis resemble spaghetti and meatballs.

== History ==
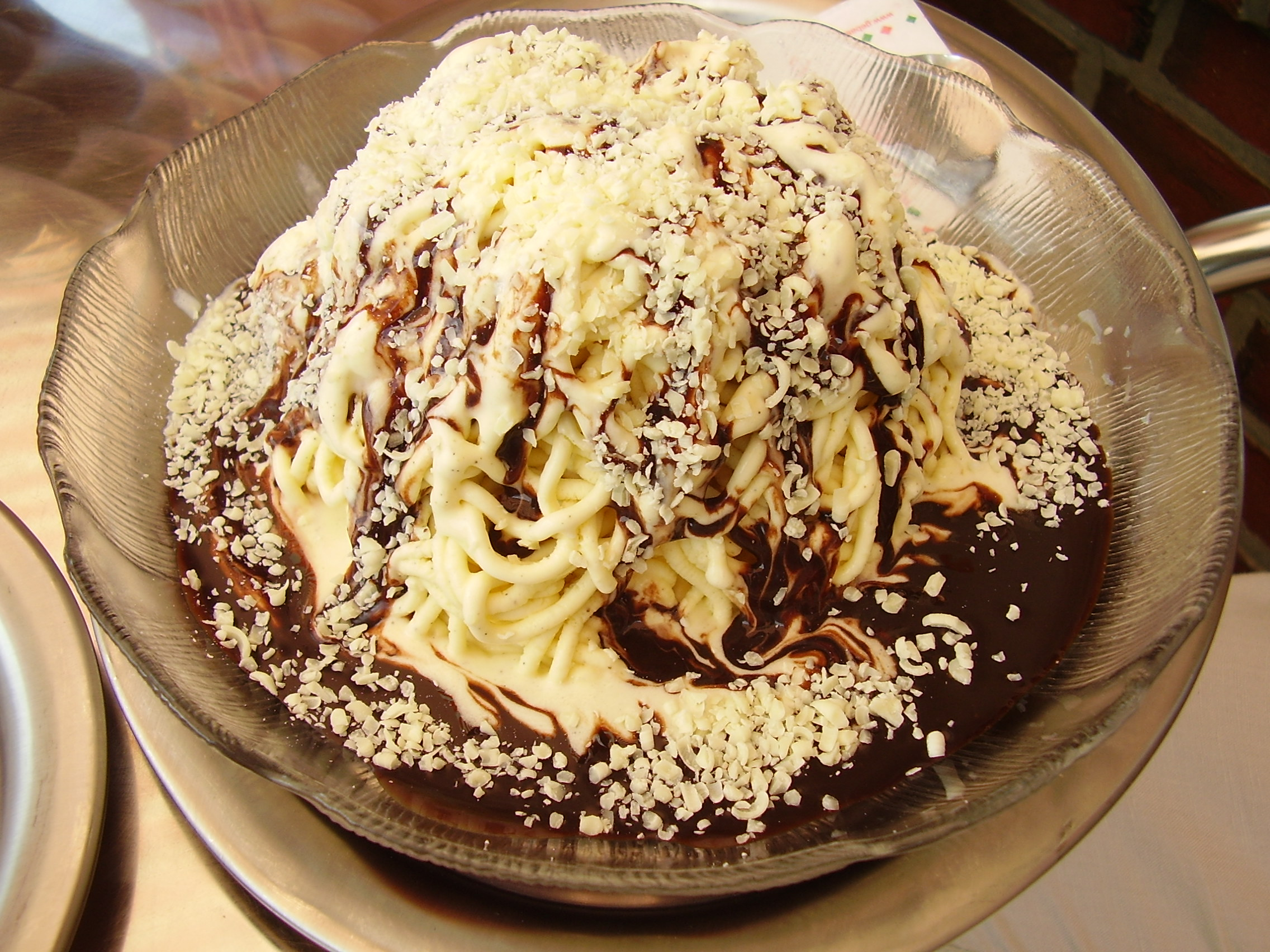
Spaghettieis with chocolate sauce and pieces of hazelnut

Spaghettieis was created by second-generation ice cream shop owner Dario Fontanella in the late 1960s in Mannheim, Germany. Fontanella was inspired by a mont blanc he tried as a teenager while skiing in Cortina d'Ampezzo. After being informed that the dessert was made using a spätzle press, he wanted to try creating a similar dish using the gelato from his father's shop. Fontanella's first attempt at spaghettieis did not impress his father; he used strawberry, lemon and pistachio gelato to create a colorful depiction of the Italian flag. After switching to vanilla gelato and topping it with a strawberry purée, he grated a white chocolate Easter egg over top to resemble parmesan cheese. Fontanella recalls that initially, children who were served spaghettieis broke into tears because they wanted ice cream and not a plate of spaghetti. He received the "Bloomaulorden", a medal bestowed by the city of Mannheim, in 2014.

For many years, the dish was not well-known outside Germany, and could only be found at some gelaterias and specialty ice cream parlors, special events, and hotels and restaurants around the world. Since approximately 2014, Spaghettieis has begun to appear as a novelty in more restaurants and has had some attention on social media.
