= Bouvardia elegans =

Scientific classification
- Kingdom: Plantae
- Clade: Tracheophytes
- Clade: Angiosperms
- Clade: Eudicots
- Clade: Asterids
- Order: Gentianales
- Family: Rubiaceae
- Genus: Bouvardia
- Species: B. elegans

Binomial name
- Bouvardia elegans Borhidi

Species of plant

Bouvardia elegans is a species of flowering plant in the family Rubiaceae. It is found in Mexico.
