= Abbey House Museum =

Museum in Leeds, England

Coordinates: 53°49′20″N 1°36′25″W

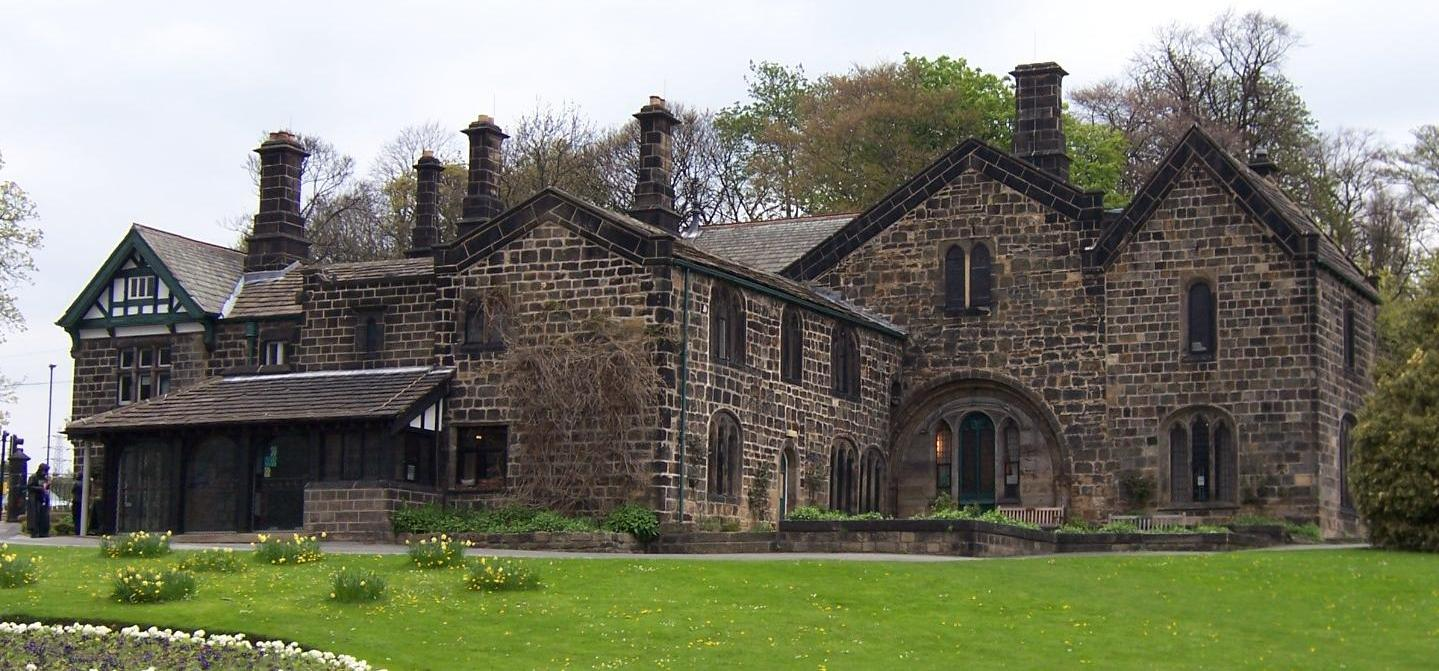
Abbey House Museum

Abbey House Museum in Kirkstall, Leeds, West Yorkshire, England is housed in the gatehouse of the ruined 12th-century Kirkstall Abbey, and is a Grade II* listed building. The house is 3 miles (4.8 km) north-west of Leeds city centre on the A65 road. It is part of the Leeds Museums & Galleries group.

== History ==
The core of the heritage building served as Kirkstall Abbey's inner gatehouse until King Henry VIII dissolved the monasteries, after which it became a farmhouse and later served as a home for the owners of the Kirkstall Forge. It was bought by Leeds City Council in 1926, and was considered for use as the judges' lodgings before the decision was made to create the museum. Since the building became a part of the museum, it served as a cafe, but the cafe was moved after the pandemic.

The museum opened in July 1927. The ground floor is set out as an area of Victorian streets, illustrating a range of shops and services and including original shop fittings etc. The first street, Abbey Fold, opened in July 1954. Harewood Square opened in 1955 and Stephen Harding Gate in 1958.

The museum was refurbished between 1998 and 2001 funded by National Lottery Heritage Fund, adding 12 new shops and houses. The refurbishment cost £1.5 million.

Upstairs, the galleries feature childhood collections, community-curated displays and temporary exhibitions.

The paranormal TV programme Most Haunted visited the Abbey House Museum in the first episode of Series 19. The crew experienced apparent paranormal incidents which included knocking and a piano playing by itself.

In December 2024 Leeds City Council announced a consultation over plans to close the museum. There was strong local opposition, and in February 2025 the council announced that the museum would remain open.

== See also ==
- Grade II* listed buildings in Leeds
- Listed buildings in Leeds (Kirkstall Ward)
- Violet Crowther
- Emily Wardman
