= Hope UK =

UK charity

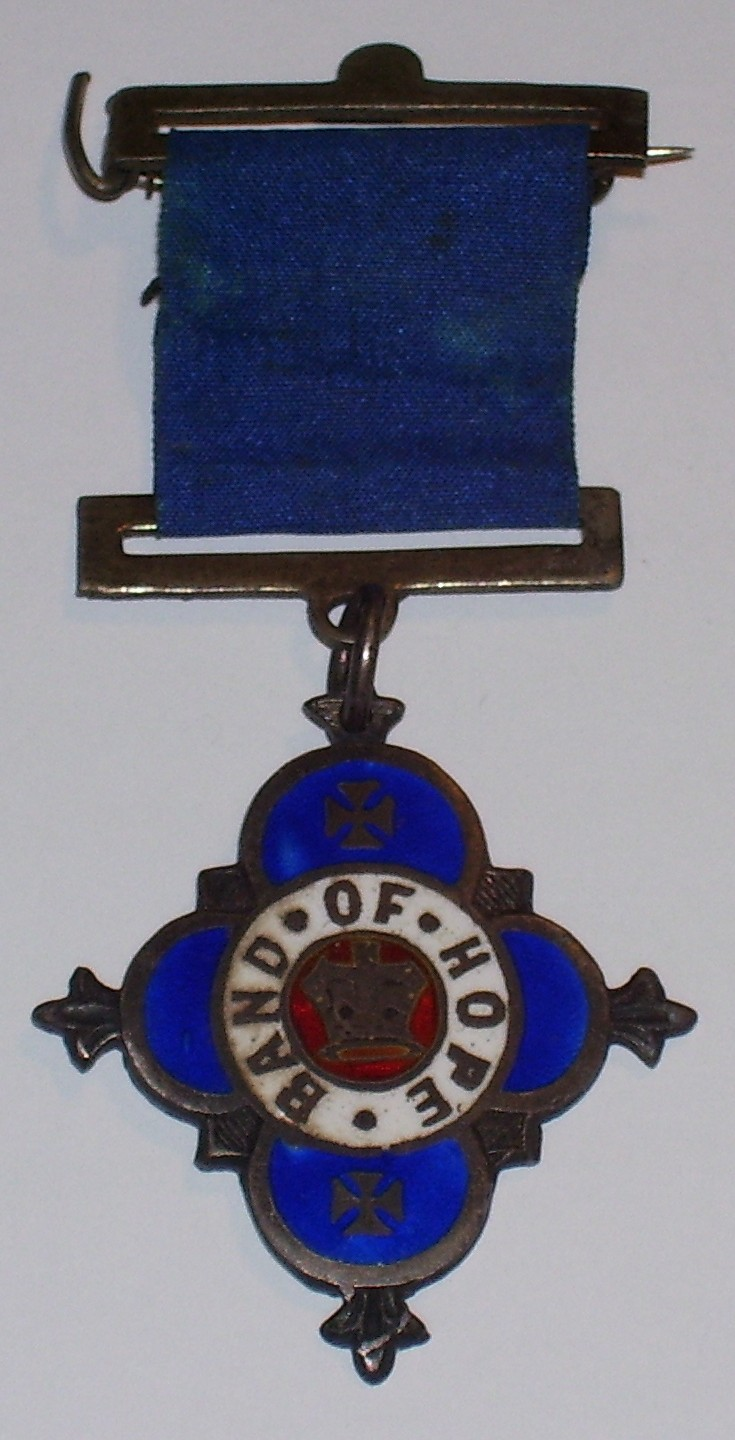
Medallion worn by members of the Band of Hope in the early 20th century

Hope UK is a United Kingdom Christian charity based in London, England, which educates children and young people about drug and alcohol abuse. Local meetings started in 1847 and a formal organisation was established in 1855 with the name The United Kingdom Band of Hope Union.

== Band of Hope ==
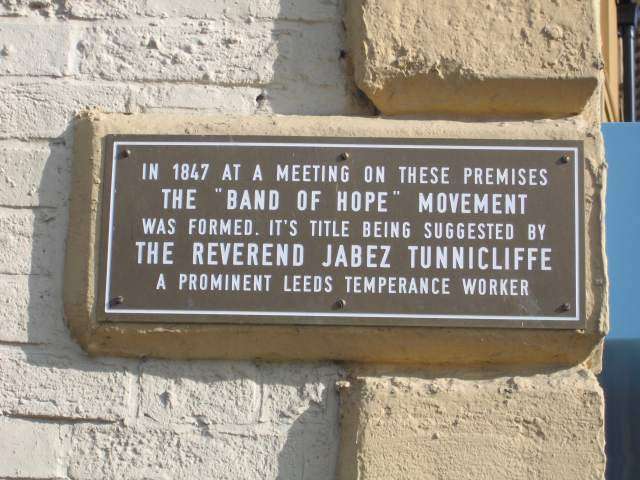
In 1847 at a meeting on these premises the "Band of Hope" Movement was formed. Its title being suggested by the Reverend Jabez Tunnicliff, a prominent Leeds temperance worker.

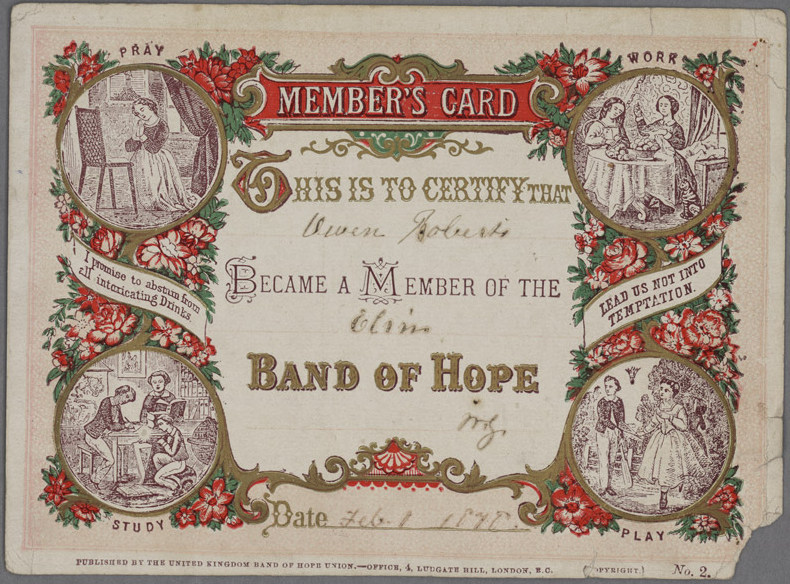
Band of Hope Member's Card 1870

The Band of Hope was first proposed by Rev. Jabez Tunnicliff, who was a Baptist minister in Leeds, following the death in June 1847 of a young man whose life was cut short by alcohol. While working in Leeds, Tunnicliff had become an advocate for total abstinence from alcohol. In the autumn of 1847, with the help of other temperance workers including Anne Jane Carlile, the Band of Hope was founded. Its objective was to teach children the importance and principles of sobriety and teetotalism. In 1855, a national organisation was formed amidst an explosion of Band of Hope work. Meetings were held in churches throughout the UK and included Christian teaching.

Set up in an era when alcoholic drinks was generally viewed as a necessity of life, next only to food and water, the Band of Hope and other temperance organisations fought to counteract the influence of pubs and brewers, with the specific intention of rescuing 'unfortunates' whose lives had been blighted by drink and teach complete abstinence.

Christians and Temperance Societies saw this as a way of providing activities for children that encouraged them to avoid alcohol problems. Alcohol-free premises were established, rallies, marches and demonstrations were mounted to oppose the "evils" of hard liquor that were attended by thousands of supporters, and coffee taverns were established to keep teetotallers on the straight and narrow path.

"Signing the pledge" was one of the innovative features. The pledge was a promise not to drink alcohol and millions of people signed up. There were also lectures that were illustrated by magic lantern, and noted personalities were invited to speak at public meetings in support of the cause. Guy Aldred was an active propagandist for the Band of Hope before focussing his activities on anarcho-communist politics.

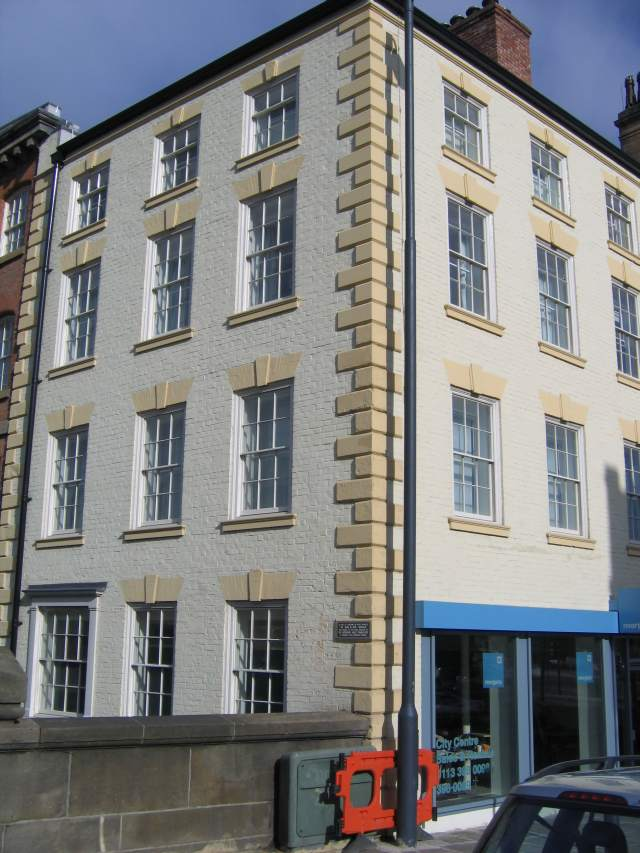
Building on Bridge End, next to Leeds Bridge, Leeds, in which the Band of Hope was founded in 1847

By 1897, its estimated membership was over 3 million. Band of Hope also had chapters in Australia prior to World War I. By the early 1950s, however, the temperance movement had all but succumbed to a changing society and cultural habits. Lack of support for the Band of Hope eventually brought about their transformation into Hope UK.

Hope UK remains concerned with children's welfare, giving priority to the development of resources and training for parents and children's workers of many kinds. The charity also attempts to persuade churches and other Christian organisations to include drugs awareness work within their programmes and play their part in helping to reduce the UK's alcohol and other drugs problems. Hope UK is a member of the National Council for Voluntary Youth Services (NCVYS).

== Training ==
The charity provides training courses across the UK, ranging from short workshops to two-day Open College Network (OCN) accredited courses.

Hope UK's drug educators undergo a 120-hour OCN accredited course to prepare them for leading drug awareness sessions and training courses. This course is also available for those who want to provide drug education as part of their own work.

The charity provides a two-day OCN-accredited "Young People, Drugs and the Role of the Youth Worker" course for people that work with children and young people. It also provides "Drug Prevention for Family Workers", a two-day course for those working in family centres, with parents, or for Children's or Community Development workers.

Sessions for Church Workers include the application of faith principles to drug issues; Church drug policies and practice; and suggested action by churches for and with their communities. Hope UK's Church Leaders’ Pack is also available as a paper resource.

== See also ==
- Church Penitentiary Association
- National Council for Voluntary Youth Services
- Temperance movement in the United Kingdom
