= Leeds Museums & Galleries =

Museum service in West Yorkshire, England

- Type: Local Authority Museum Service
- Headquarters: Leeds
- Location: Leeds, England
- Origins: Created by Leeds City Council to manage the city's museums and galleries
- Region served: Yorkshire
- Services: Operating Leeds' city-owned museums and galleries
- Director: David Hopes
- Employees: 146
- Volunteers: <200
- Website: museumsandgalleries.leeds.gov.uk

Leeds Museums and Galleries is a museum service run by the Leeds City Council in West Yorkshire. It manages eight sites and is the largest museum service in England and Wales run by a local authority.

== Visitor attractions ==
- Abbey House Museum
- Kirkstall Abbey
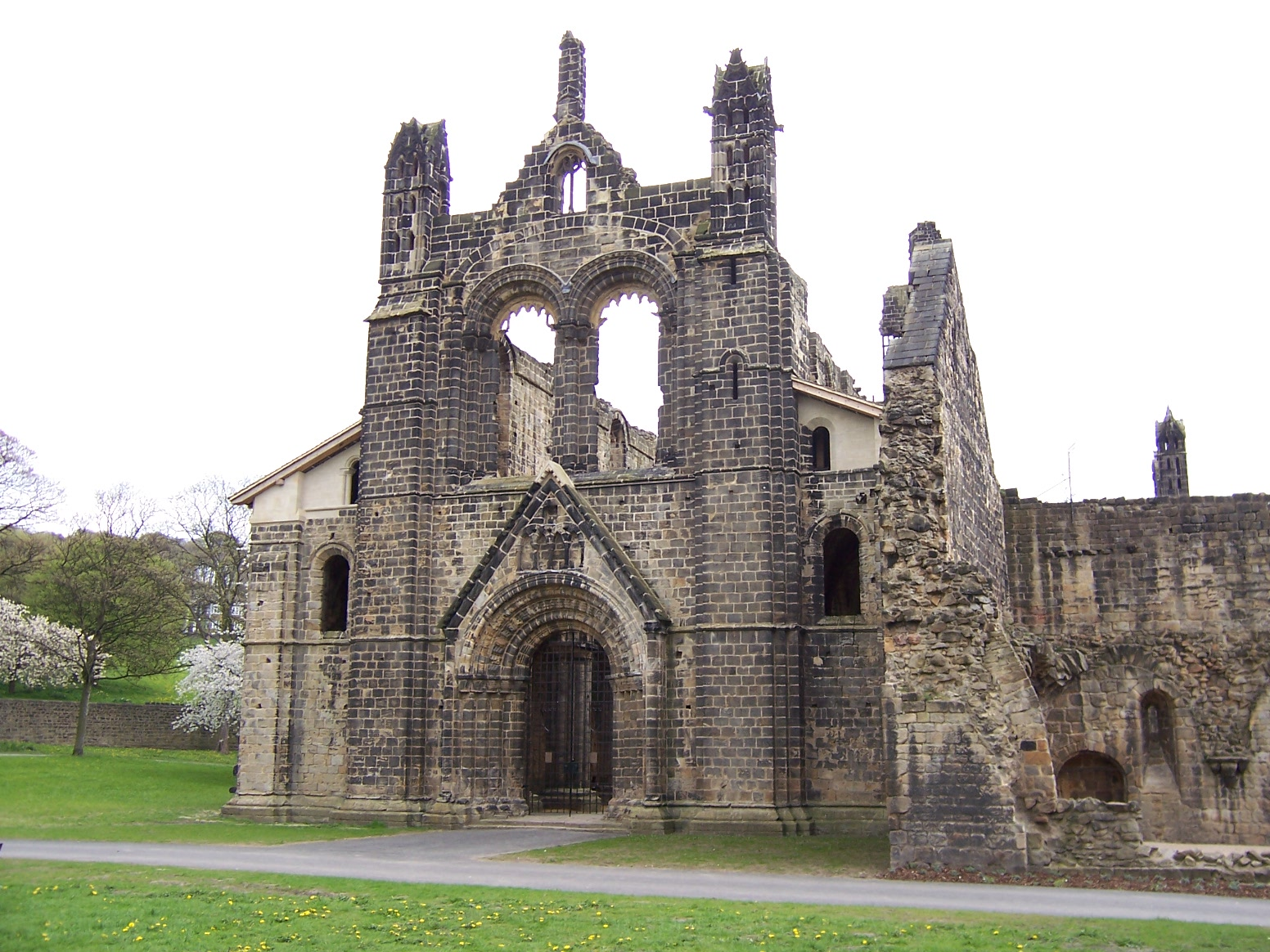
  Kirkstall Abbey
- Leeds Art Gallery
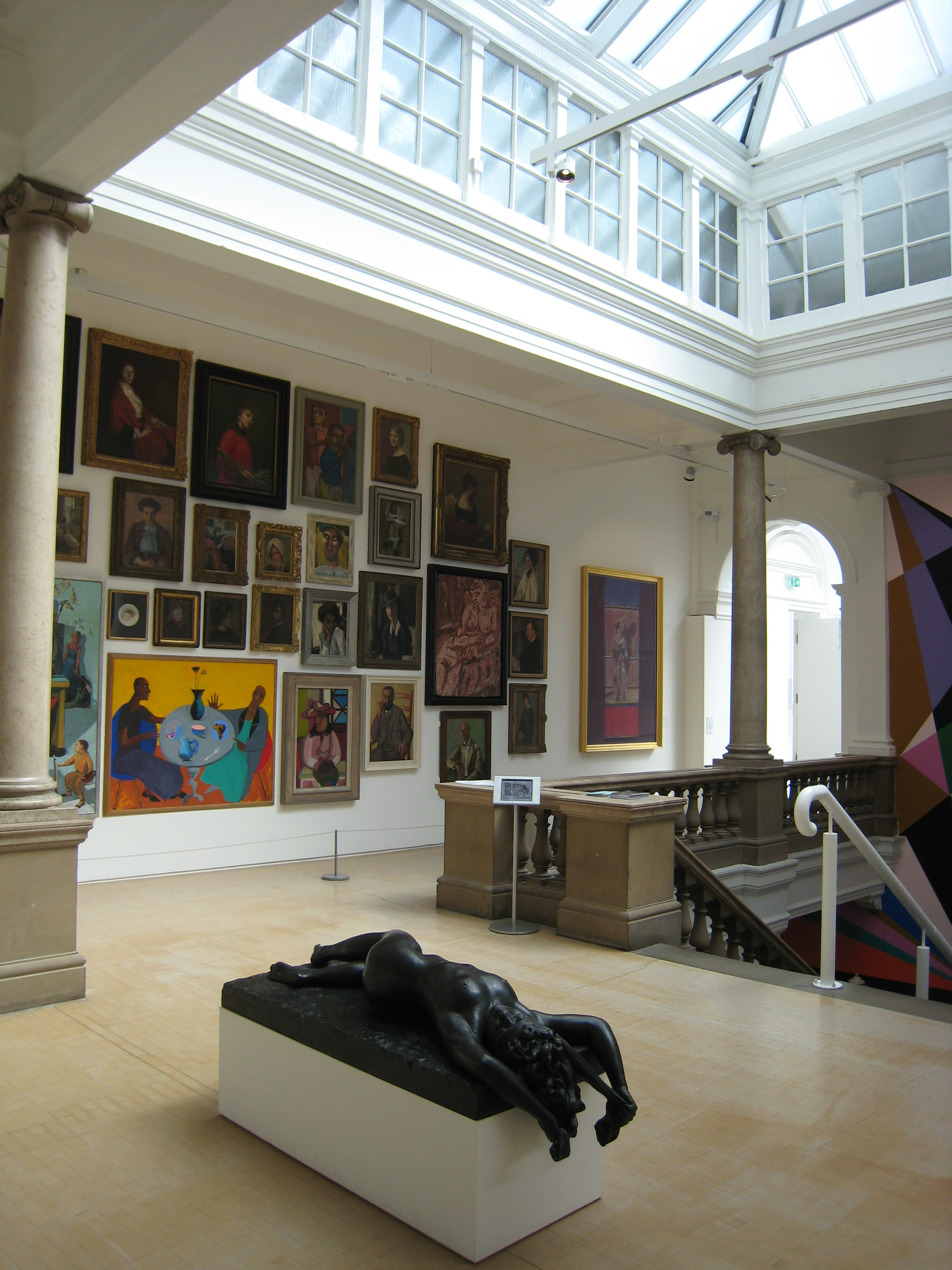
  Interior Leeds Art Gallery
- Leeds City Museum
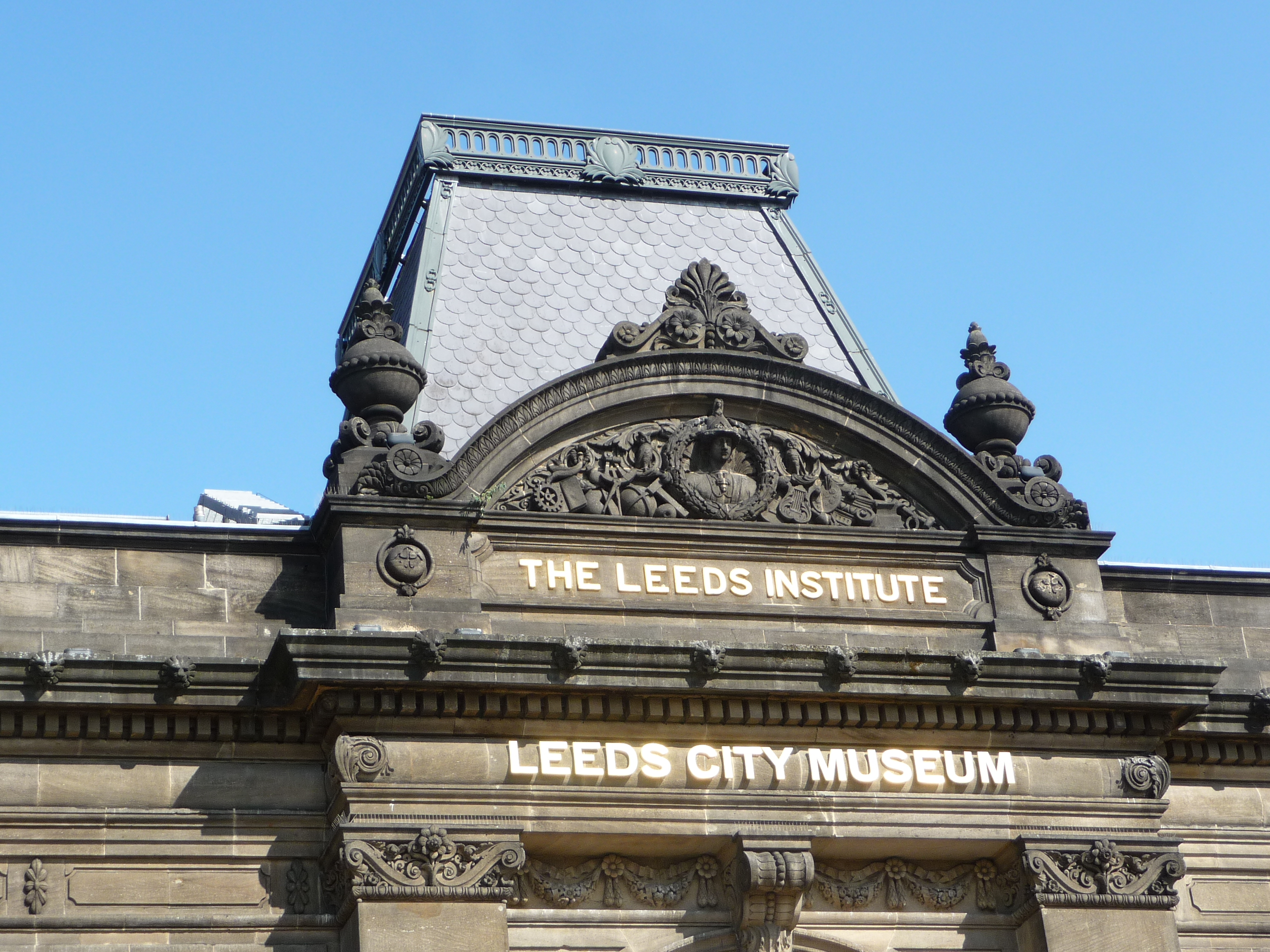
  Leeds City Museum
- Leeds Discovery Centre
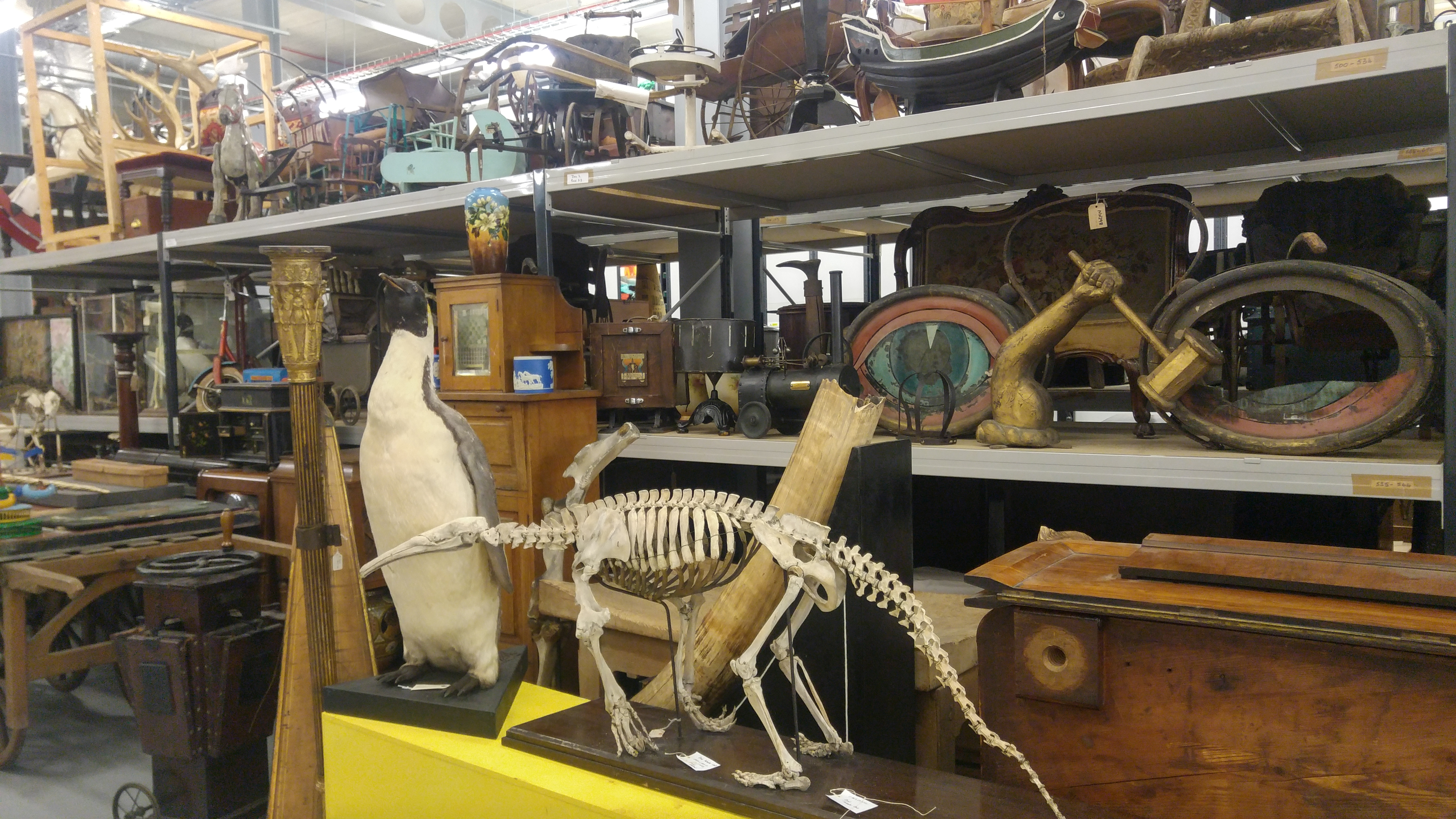
  Interior Leeds Discovery Centre
- Leeds Industrial Museum
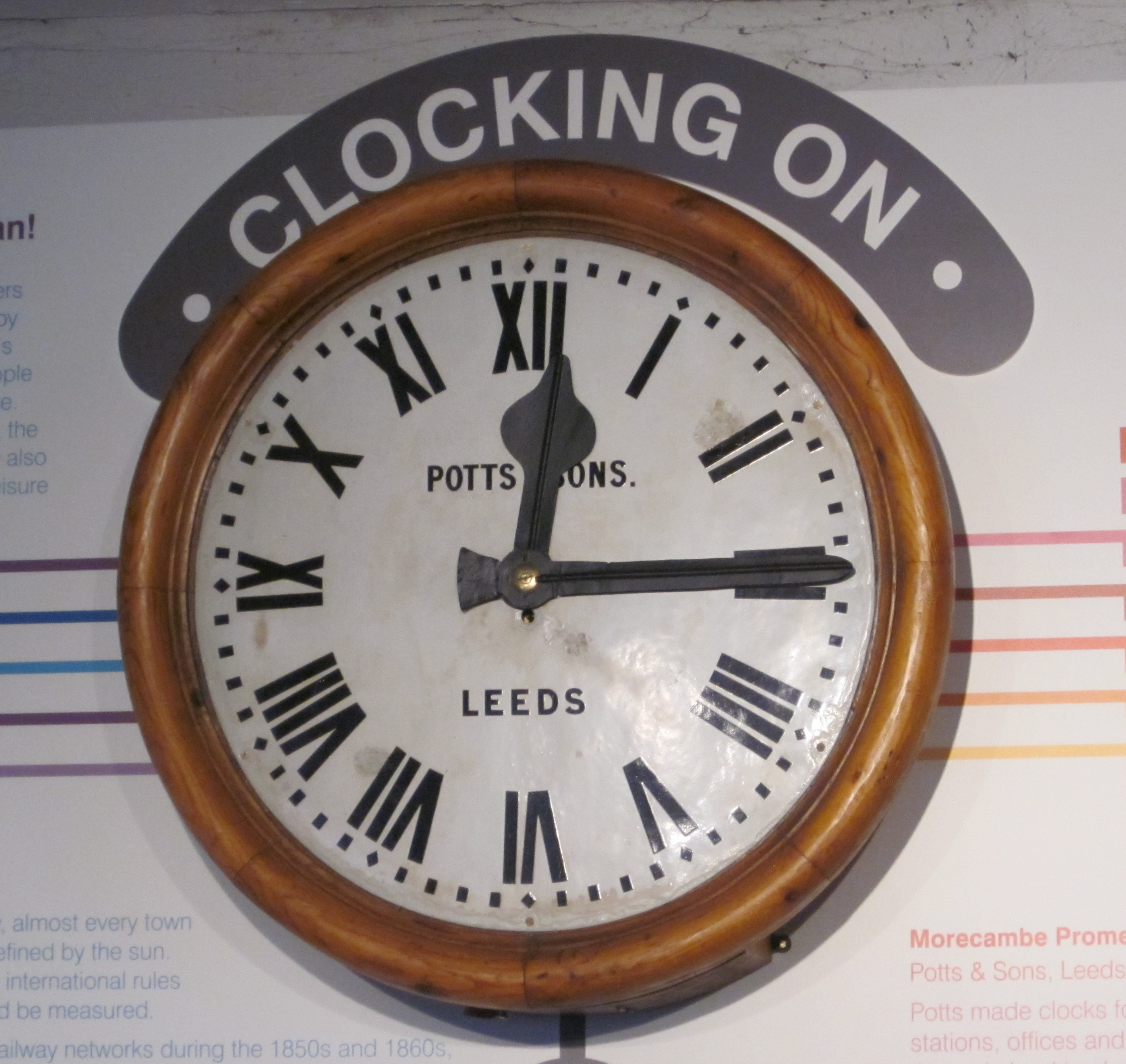
  Potts clock, at Leeds Industrial Museum
- Lotherton Hall
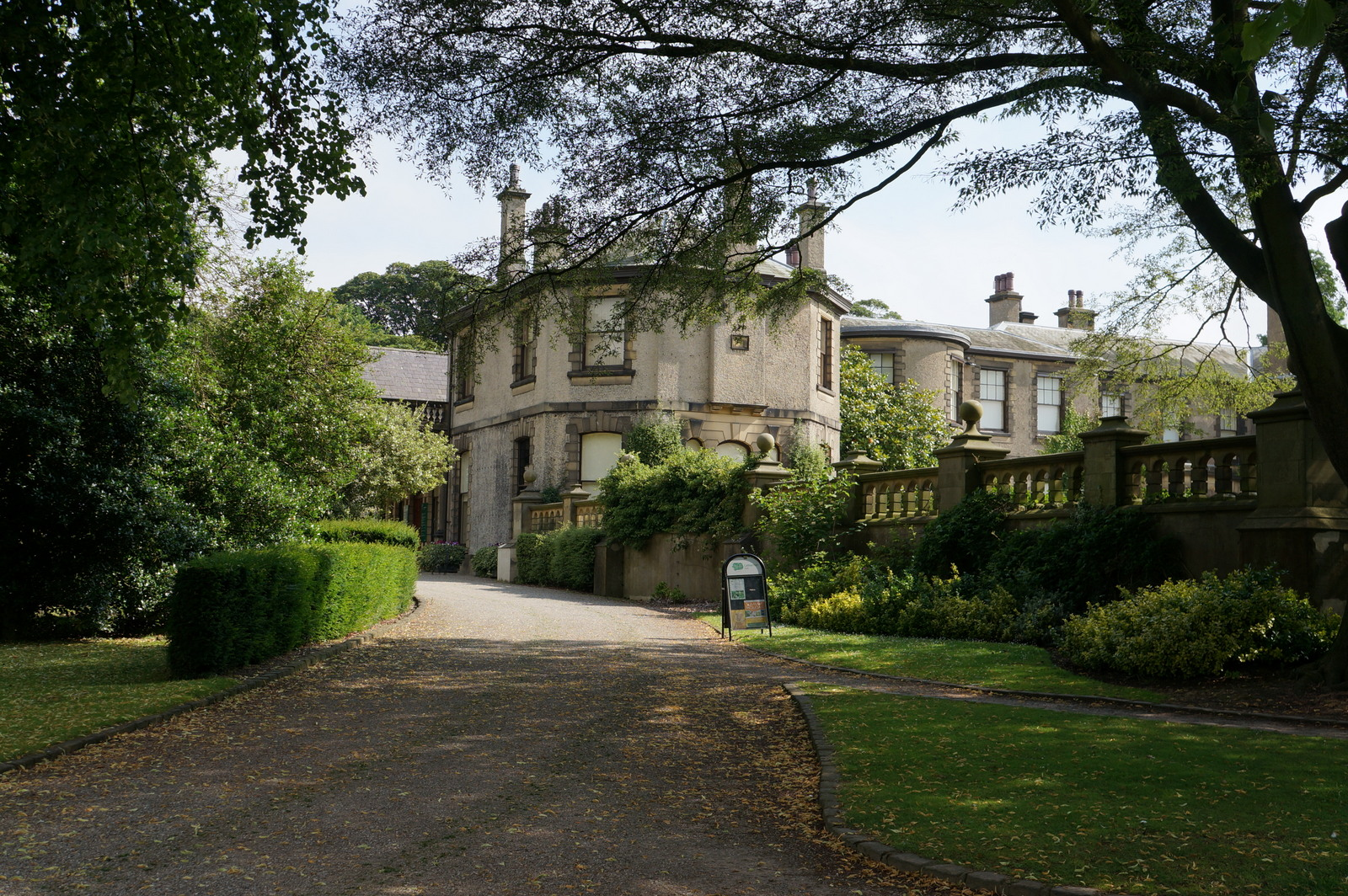
  Lotherton Hall
- Temple Newsam

== Audiences ==
Over 1.7 million visitors in 2018–19 visited the service's sites. Visitors to Leeds and other museums in West Yorkshire contributed £34 million to the regional economy over the same time period. In 2001, a review of the service found that museum learning could be far more central to its offer. The service recently developed the 'Leeds Curriculum', teaching materials for schools, which was awarded 'Educational Initiative of the Year' by the Museums & Heritage Awards.

== History ==
Leeds Museums & Galleries began life as the museum of the Leeds Philosophical and Literary Society, which opened in 1821. In 1921, the collection was purchased by Leeds Corporation, to continue as a municipal museum (Leeds City Museum). In 1928, Abbey House Museum was purchased by the Leeds Corporation, as place to display social history. Kirkstall Abbey transferred to the museum service at this time. In 1941 the museum was bombed and parts of the collections were destroyed. In 1982 Leeds Industrial Museum opened to the public, with Blue Peter presenters as guests of honour. In 1990 Thwaite Mills opened as a museum, it closed to the public on 1 April 2024 as LMG terminated its lease on the site. In 2007 Leeds Discovery Centre opened as a display store where the public can visit the collections 'behind the scenes'.

Meanwhile, Leeds Art Gallery had been founded in 1888 by public subscription. In 1921, Leeds City Council purchased Temple Newsam House as an additional venue for the arts, recognizing its historic value. These art venues were added to in 1969, with the gift of Lotherton Hall to the people of Leeds.

In 1996 the two services combined to form Leeds Museums & Galleries. On 1 April the lease to Thwaite Mills, which is owned by the Canal and Rivers Trust, was terminated by the service.

== Collections ==
Its collections comprise approximately 1.3 million objects:

- Natural Science - over 800,000 globally collected specimens including taxidermy, herbaria, conchology, geology, entomology and wet material.
- Archaeology & Numismatics - worldwide collection of historical and pre-historical material including large numismatics holdings.
- dress and textiles - predominantly British collection including a large amount of garments relating to the tailoring industry in Leeds.
- Fine Art - the collection has particular strengths in the areas of 18th and early 19th century English watercolours, 20th century British Art and a modern sculpture collection more extensive than any other regional gallery in the UK.
- Industrial History - Leeds's industrial collections comprise tools, machinery, industrial products, archive ephemera, photographs and other personal records.
- Social History - this collection is particularly significant in the areas of childhood toys and games, retailing history, domestic life, musical instruments, slot machines and automata and printed ephemera.
- World Cultures - this is a significant collection area for Leeds, with over 12,000 items demonstrating the city's historic links to the wider world, and the multicultural vibe of contemporary arts and culture.
- Decorative Art - these collections can be linked to local crafts people past and present, and features major collections of furniture, ceramics, wallpapers, modern crafts, metalwork, textiles and costume.

Four collection areas are Designated by Arts Council England to have national or international importance, these are: Decorative Art, Fine Art, Industrial Heritage and Natural Science. They are regularly consulted by researchers, on subjects as diverse as: the genetic history of the thylacine, Roman forks, back-to-back housing, body height of mummified pharaohs and thylacine pouches. The service still adds to its collections, for example through acquiring new archaeological archives. Nesyamun, on display at Leeds City Museum is a widely studied Egyptian priest.

The First World War program, which ran from 2014 to 2018, examined how Leeds was affected by the First World War, worked with people across the city.

=== Online collections ===
Some of Leeds Museums and Galleries' collections can be found online through a partnership with Google Arts and Culture.

=== Internal research ===
Staff and volunteers undertake research on sites and collections, recent publications include:

- 'The Leeds Pals Handbook' (2018)
- 'Gender and Natural Science Collections in Museums' (2017)
- 'Wallpapers at Temple Newsam: 1635 to the Present' (2017)
- 'Great War Britain: Leeds' (2015)

=== External research ===
As well as staff and volunteers researching the sites and collections, the service has partnered on several research projects. Some examples include:

- 'The Malham Pipe: a Reassessment' - revising the dating of this important historic musical instrument from the Iron Age to the early medieval period.
- 'A History of the Scientific Collections of the Leeds Philosophical and Literary Society's Museum in the Nineteenth Century' with University of Leeds (2019), a PhD by M. Steadman
- 'Everyday Fashion in Yorkshire: 1939-99' with the University of Leeds (2019)
- 'Sensory Engagements with Objects in Art Galleries' with the University of Leicester (2016), a PhD by Alexandra Woodall
- 'Hospitality in a Cistercian Abbey' with University of Leeds (2015), a PhD by Richard Thomason
- 'Leeds Patronising the Arts and Encouraging the Sciences' with English Heritage (2001)

== Funding ==
The service is run and primarily funded by Leeds City Council. As a museum service it has a regional, national and international reputation. In 2012 the organisation achieved Major Partner Museum status from Arts Council England, which brought significant additional funding to develop its work. This was continued in 2015. In 2018, Leeds Museums & Galleries was awarded National Portfolio Organisation status until 2022. In 2018 9% of its workforce came from a BAME background.

== See also ==
- Henry Denny
- Violet Crowther
- Emily Wardman
- Evelyn Silber
- Leeds Tiger
- John Grimshaw Wilkinson
