= Emily Wardman =

British collector and founder of a private museum of social history

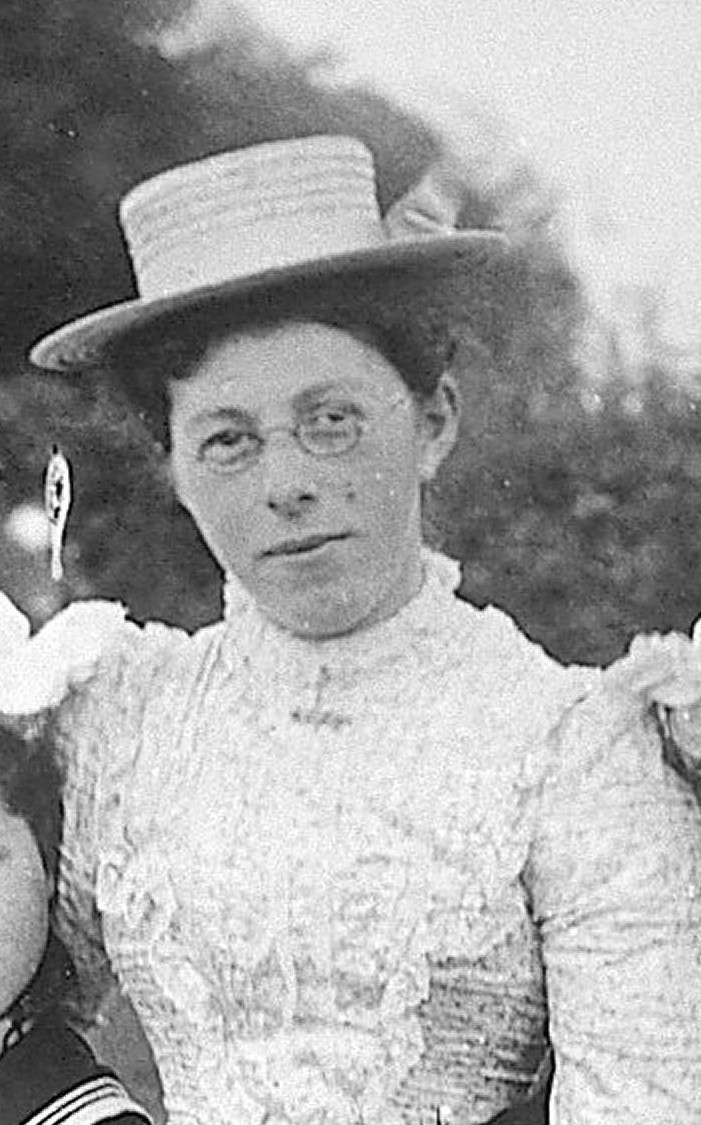
- Emily Wardman, creator and curator of a private museum of social history in Wetherby. (Image credit: Wetherby Historical Trust)
- Born: 1872
- Died: 9 May 1939 (aged 66–67)
- Monuments: Blue plaque in Wetherby
- Occupation(s): Collector, historian, curator
- Known for: Author of Wetherby: Its People & Customs

Emily Wardman (1872 - 9 May 1939) was a British collector and founder of a private museum of social history, now part of the collections of Leeds Museums and Galleries.

== Biography ==
Wardman was the daughter of Michael and Mary Stead, whose family farmed at Kearby in Yorkshire for many generations. She began collecting at an early age, following the advice of her grandmother, who told her ‘never throw anything away’. She married Charles Wardman, a local farmer, in 1893, and later ran a drapery business in Wetherby.

She was interested in archaeology, collecting what she understood as ‘Stone Age relics’ from around the family farm, and was a member of the Yorkshire Archaeological Society. However, her main contribution was in the field of social history. Starting with small objects such as buttons from coachmen's livery, she built up a large collection of over 1,000 objects, mostly linked to the Yorkshire area. These included tools used in agriculture, veterinary practice, and ironmongery; toys; domestic furniture and implements such as lamps and candlesticks; and decorative arts including snuff boxes and a large collection of fans. Her collection also encompassed ephemera such as matchboxes and Victorian valentines; armaments; and prehistoric human remains. Grounded in local history and the community from which the objects came, this was an important collection recording ways of life which were rapidly changing due to technological advances and social changes in the early 20th century. Wardman organised her collection into a private museum, displayed in two rooms above her drapery shop at Belper House, 21 Market Street, Wetherby, now marked with a blue plaque. She became a member of the Museums Association, and welcomed visits from local societies and friends. She was known as a local historian and expert on folklore, on which she corresponded with the local press.

== Legacy ==
In 1938 Wardman compiled her local knowledge into a book titled Wetherby: its People and Customs. She died in 1939 at the age of 68. Some years later her son, M. Allan Wardman, generously donated the collection to Leeds Museums, where it made an important addition to the social history collections at Abbey House Museum under the curatorial direction of Violet Crowther. The significance of the collection was recognised by the Director of Leeds Museums, David Owen, who said ‘we could never have collected [it] ourselves, as it represents the lifetime's work of someone intimately connected with country folk’. It is also testament to Wardman's skill in identifying and selecting objects to preserve, and recording their histories. Many of her objects can still be seen on display at Abbey House Museum.
