= Beckett Street Cemetery =

Burial ground in Leeds, Yorkshire, England

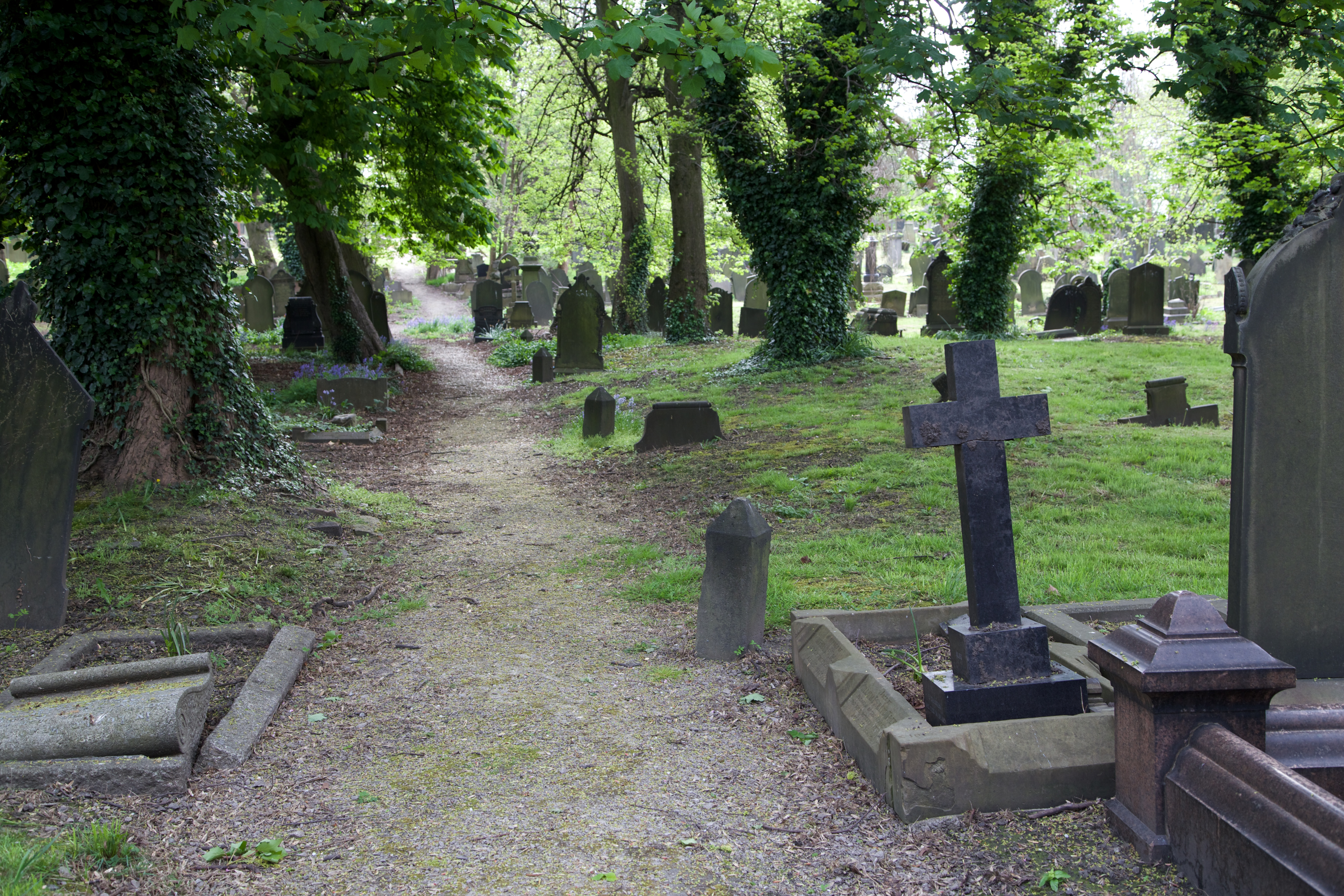
- Beckett Street Cemetery

Details
- Established: 1842 (opened in 1845)
- Closed: 2001
- Location: Burmantofts, Leeds, West Yorkshire
- Country: England
- Coordinates: 53.807°N 1.516°W
- Size: 16 acres (6.5 ha)
- No. of graves: 27,000
- No. of interments: 180,000
- Find a Grave: Beckett Street Cemetery

National Register of Historic Parks and Gardens
- Official name: Beckett Street Cemetery
- Designated: 17 April 2002
- Reference no.: 1001605

Beckett Street Cemetery (also known as Burmantofts Cemetery) is a closed cemetery in Burmantofts, Leeds, West Yorkshire, England. Founded in 1842, the site was officially opened in 1845 and is recognised as being one of England's first municipal burial sites (Hunslet Cemetery, also in Leeds, opened one month earlier). Although the cemetery was closed to interments in 2001, it remains open for visitors, and has two listed structures besides being a listed park itself.

== History ==
The site was approved as part of the Leeds Burial Grounds Act 1842 (5 & 6 Vict. c. ciii), initially to cover an area of 10 acres (4 ha), and saw its first burial on 14 August 1845. Land was acquired from William Beckett, who was elected to Parliament for Leeds in 1841. His neighbour, Griffith Wright Junior, who was the editor of the Leeds Intelligencer (a forerunner of The Yorkshire Post), also offered his land for sale as he thought the presence of a cemetery would de-value his property. The first burial, that of a child, was officiated over by Jabez Tunnicliff, a Baptist minister who was prominent in Temperance circles. Eventually, some twenty years later, Tunnicliff himself would end up being interred in the cemetery.

It was initially known as Burmantofts Cemetery (at least until 1895), and Leeds Burial Ground, but is now popularly known as Beckett Street Cemetery, and was one of the first municipal cemeteries in England; one that was bought and organised by the town council with public funds. (Note: A cemetery in Leeds was opened at Woodhouse Moor in 1835, but by a company of shareholders. The Beckett Street Cemetery was sponsored by Leeds Town Council, Leeds still being a town at this time, not gaining city status until 1893. Hunslet Cemetery (also known as Woodhouse Hill Cemetery), was opened one month earlier in July 1845.) A new site was needed as the old burial ground at Leeds Parish Church was severely overcrowded, with gravediggers having to smash the coffins of those already interred to fit newer coffins in. The site, when chosen, was in far more rural location than now, aside from the modern-day Leeds urban area - it was surrounded by fields and brick kilns, an industry that Burmantofts was known for in the 19th century. During the preparation time, evidence was found of coaling and ironstone activities at the site, with many bell-pits having to be filled in.

The site was divided into two areas; the north-west was for dissenters, and the south-east was for the Anglican dead. Both entrances had their own gatehouse designed by a team of local architects (Chantrell and Shaw). the twin lodges at each entrance, followed later in 1880, being designed by Leeds architect, Walter Samuel Braithwaite. A survey in 1998 established that the cemetery has 180,000 burials, 27,000 graves, and 8,000 monuments. Of these, 72 are Commonwealth Graves from both the First and Second World Wars. Also present is the grave of one of the survivors from the Charge of the Light Brigade, Frederick Short, whose gravestone is adorned with crossed sabres, the Shako headgear of the brigade and the text stating "one of the 600." Short's grave is on what is known as Light Brigade Row, near to another participant in the Crimean campaign, William Notley. In 1849, 1,600 victims of a cholera epidemic in Leeds were buried at the site in mass graves.

In the 1880s, the idea of charging only a guinea for a burial led to the phrase Guinea Graves. Many of those who were buried in these graves were from the workhouse opposite the cemetery (now the site of St James' Hospital). Each name was recorded on a collective headstone that housed many bodies in the grave beneath it. During the nineteenth century, burials were an average of 3,000 per year, but this amount slowed significantly after the First World War. The site was closed to new burials in 2001, and is now managed by the Friends of Beckett Street Cemetery.

A proposal for a Leeds Supertram network in the early 2000s, would have seen the cemetery destroyed to provide space a for a tram stop adjacent to St James' Hospital (opposite the cemetery). After cancellation of the supertram project in 2005, Leeds City Council awarded the site £150,000 for repairs and maintenance, with one councillor describing the cemetery as a "hidden gem". In 2015, the West Yorkshire Archive Service digitized the burial registers from 1845 to 1987 on the ancestry.co.uk website. Besides being on the National Register of Parks and Gardens, the site also has two listed buildings; one a memorial stone which commemorates members of the Kidney family, who were Steeplejacks in the area. The structure is grade II listed 3-metre (9.8 ft) high industrial chimney. The second structure commemorates the Gailli family, and is also grade II listed.

== Notable interments ==
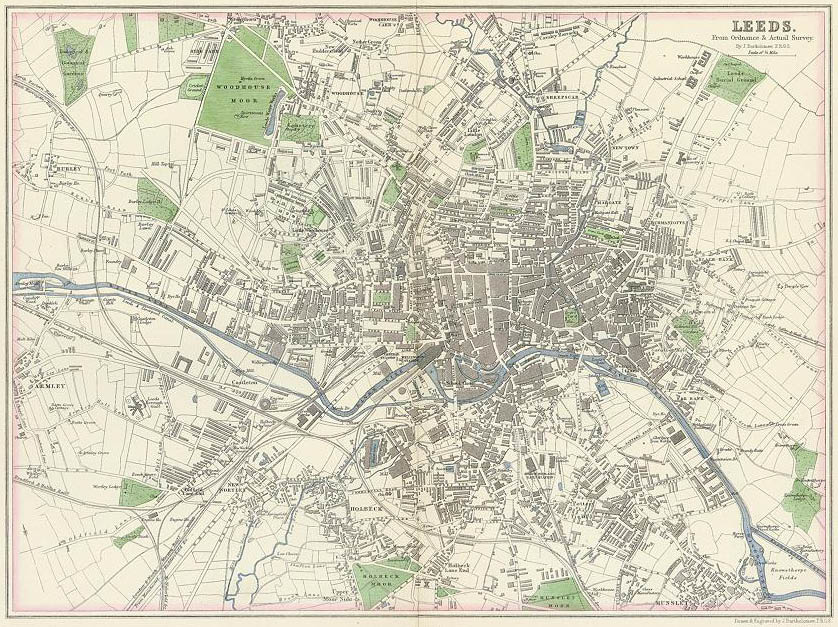
An 1866 map of Leeds showing Beckett Street Cemetery top right
- John Wormald Appleyard
- Sir John Barran, 1st Baronet
- Tom Maguire
- George Thompson (abolitionist)
- Jabez Tunnicliff
- John Grimshaw Wilkinson

== See also ==
- Hunslet Cemetery
