= Bouvardin =

Names
- IUPAC name (1S,4R,7S,10S,13S,16S,17S)-17,24-Dihydroxy-10-(4-methoxybenzyl)-4,7,9,13,15,29-hexamethyl-22-oxa-3,6,9,12,15,29-hexaazatetracyclo[14.12.2.218,21.123,27]tritriaconta-18,20,23(31),24,26,32-hexaene-2,5,8,11,14,30-hexone

Identifiers
CAS Number	64755-14-2
3D model (JSmol)	Interactive image
ChemSpider	9989364
PubChem CID	73624
UNII	22AY1D3UAX
CompTox Dashboard (EPA)	DTXSID30983377
- InChI: InChI=1S/C40H48N6O10/c1-21-35(49)42-22(2)38(52)44(4)29(18-24-8-13-27(55-7)14-9-24)37(51)43-23(3)39(53)46(6)33-34(48)26-11-15-28(16-12-26)56-32-20-25(10-17-31(32)47)19-30(36(50)41-21)45(5)40(33)54/h8-17,20-23,29-30,33-34,47-48H,18-19H2,1-7H3,(H,41,50)(H,42,49)(H,43,51)/t21-,22-,23+,29-,30+,33+,34?/m0/s1 Key: TWOWSRSKGJSZHZ-ZRCCEHQSSA-N
- SMILES: CC1C(=O)NC(C(=O)N(C(C(=O)NC(C(=O)N(C2C(C3=CC=C(C=C3)OC4=C(C=CC(=C4)CC(C(=O)N1)N(C2=O)C)O)O)C)C)CC5=CC=C(C=C5)OC)C)C

Properties
Chemical formula	C_{40}H_{48}N_{6}O_{10}
Molar mass	772.8 g/mol
- Except where otherwise noted, data are given for materials in their standard state (at 25 °C [77 °F], 100 kPa). Infobox references

Bouvardin is a bicyclic hexapeptide isolated from Bouvardia ternifolia. Its chemical formula is C_{40}H_{48}N_{6}O_{10}. It is derived from the amino acid sequence Ala-Ala-Tyr-Ala-Tyr-Tyr. It has demonstrated certain anti-cancerous activities by inhibiting protein synthesis through inhibition of 80S ribosomes (eukaryotic ribosomes).
