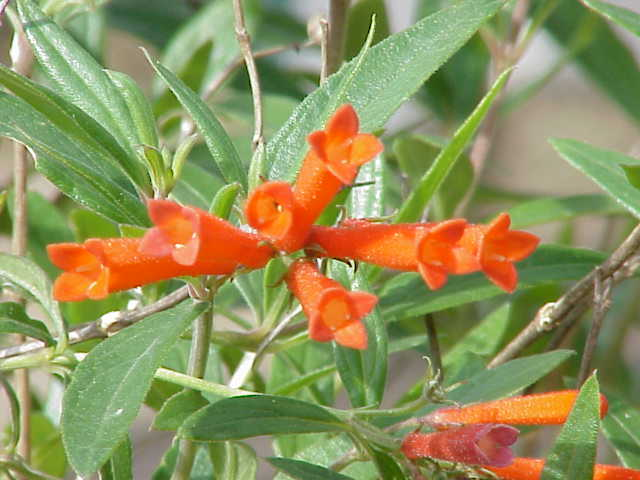
- Bouvardia ternifolia

Scientific classification
- Kingdom: Plantae
- Clade: Tracheophytes
- Clade: Angiosperms
- Clade: Eudicots
- Clade: Asterids
- Order: Gentianales
- Family: Rubiaceae
- Subfamily: Rubioideae
- Tribe: Spermacoceae
- Genus: Bouvardia; Salisb.

Type species
- Bouvardia ternifolia (Cav.) Schltdl.

Synonyms
- Aeginetia Cav.

= Bouvardia =

Genus of flowering plants

Bouvardia is a genus of flowering plants in the family Rubiaceae. It contains about 50 species of evergreen herbs and shrubs native to Mexico and Central America, with one species extending into the southwestern United States (B. ternifolia, in Arizona, New Mexico and Texas). The genus is named in honor of Charles Bouvard (1572–1658), physician to Louis XIII, and superintendent of the Jardin du Roi in Paris.

In the language of flowers, Bouvardia symbolize enthusiasm.

== Description ==
They grow to 0.6–1.5 m tall. The leaves are opposite or in whorls of 3-5, ovate to lanceolate, 3–11 cm long. The flowers are in terminal, generally many-flowered clusters; the corolla has a large tube and four spreading lobes; flower colour ranges varies between species, with white, yellow, pink, and red all found.

== Uses ==
Several species of Bouvardia are grown as ornamental plants, both in the tropics and indoors as houseplants in temperate regions. Several cultivars and hybrids have been selected. When grown as houseplants, a minimum winter temperature of 7 °C is required, with a minimum of 12 °C while in flower. Propagation of the cultivars is by cuttings taken in late spring or summer, which need to be kept at a temperature of 20 °C by night and 25 °C during the day, and shaded when required.

== Species ==
- Bouvardia amplexicaulis Borhidi & E.Martinez
- Bouvardia borhidiana Lozada-Pérez
- Bouvardia bouvardioides (Seem.) Standl.
- Bouvardia candidissima Borhidi & E.Martinez
- Bouvardia capitata Bullock
- Bouvardia castilloi Borhidi & Garcia Gonz.
- Bouvardia chrysantha Mart.
- Bouvardia conzattii Greenm.
- Bouvardia cordifolia DC.
- Bouvardia costaricensis C.M.Taylor
- Bouvardia dictyoneura Standl.
- Bouvardia elegans Borhidi
- Bouvardia erecta DC.
- Bouvardia ferruginea Borhidi
- Bouvardia glabra Polak
- Bouvardia gracilipes B.L.Rob.
- Bouvardia hernan-maganae Borhidi & Serrano-Card.
- Bouvardia hintoniorum B.L.Turner
- Bouvardia karwinskyi Standl.
- Bouvardia keniae Borhidi & Saynes
- Bouvardia laevis M.Martens & Galeotti
- Bouvardia langlassei Standl.
- Bouvardia latifolia Standl.
- Bouvardia leiantha Benth.
- Bouvardia loeseneriana Standl.
- Bouvardia longiflora (Cav.) Kunth
- Bouvardia lottiae Borhidi
- Bouvardia mitlensis Borhidi & Salas-Mor.
- Bouvardia multiflora (Cav.) Schult. & Schult.f.
- Bouvardia oaxacana Standl.
- Bouvardia obovata Kunth
- Bouvardia pallida Standl.
- Bouvardia pascualii Borhidi
- Bouvardia pedicellaris Borhidi
- Bouvardia pulverulenta Borhidi & Salas-Mor.
- Bouvardia pungens Borhidi
- Bouvardia quinquenervata Standl.
- Bouvardia rekoi Standl.
- Bouvardia rosea Schltdl.
- Bouvardia rosei Standl.
- Bouvardia rzedowskii Terrell & S.D.Koch
- Bouvardia sancaroli Borhidi & M.Martinez
- Bouvardia scabra Hook. & Arn.
- Bouvardia standleyana W.H.Blackw.
- Bouvardia stenosiphon Borhidi & Salas-Mor.
- Bouvardia subcordata Standl.
- Bouvardia tenuifolia Standl.
- Bouvardia ternifolia (Cav.) Schltdl.
- Bouvardia tubicalyx Borhidi & Salas-Mor.
- Bouvardia viminalis Schltdl.
- Bouvardia xestosperma (B.L.Rob. & Greenm.) Terrell & S.D.Koch
- Bouvardia xylosteoides Hook. & Arn.
