= Jabez Tunnicliff =

Reverend Jabez Tunnicliff

Reverend Jabez Tunnicliff (7 February 1809 – 15 June 1865) was a minister of the General Baptist Church in England. He was the founder of the Band of Hope temperance movement.

== Life and family ==
Jabez Tunnicliff was born on 7 February 1809, the second surviving son of John Tunnicliff. Of 22 children, only Jabez, his older brother William, and six of their sisters survived to adulthood. His father was a boot and shoe maker in Wolverhampton.

He was apprenticed at age 13 to learn japanning, and used this skill to support himself as a painter and decorator in some pastoral situations. While still apprenticed, he secretly married Mary Ann, a young lady in the church he attended. Theirs was a good marriage, but their youth made it financially difficult, and this hindered his church work.

Jabez Tunnicliff died at 2:45 p.m. on Thursday, 15 June 1865, aged 56. His funeral was the following Sunday at Burmantofts Cemetery, Leeds, with an estimated 15,000 people present. The Leeds Express for 25 June 1865 reports that about 1,100 temperance supporters walked through the town following the coffin.

== Church work ==
In 1832, Jabez Tunnicliff was invited to become the minister of Cradley Baptist Church. However, in February 1833 he began to question the Calvinistic teaching, and left in November 1833. In December 1833 he and about 30 others began meeting and formed Cradley Heath Baptist Church. While fundraising for the new building at Cradley Heath, he was asked to become the minister of Longford Baptist Church (between Coventry and Bedworth, Warwickshire), where he had a successful ministry until 1842. He resigned that pastorate with a view to working in America, but was employed by the Baptist Home Mission department in Leeds.

== Band of Hope ==
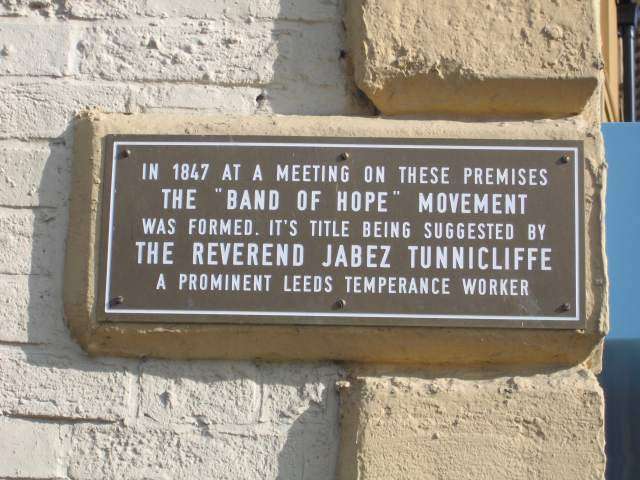

During his time at Leeds, Jabez Tunnicliff became an advocate for temperance, and spoke out for this alongside his regular church work. In 1847, after the death of a young man "through intemperance" and in discussion with several other temperance supporters, he proposed a new organisation to promote temperance amongst younger people. There is some dispute as to whether the name given to this organisation; the "Band of Hope" was coined by him or by Anne Jane Carlisle.
