= Ricing (cooking) =

Forcing food through a plate with small holes to smooth it out

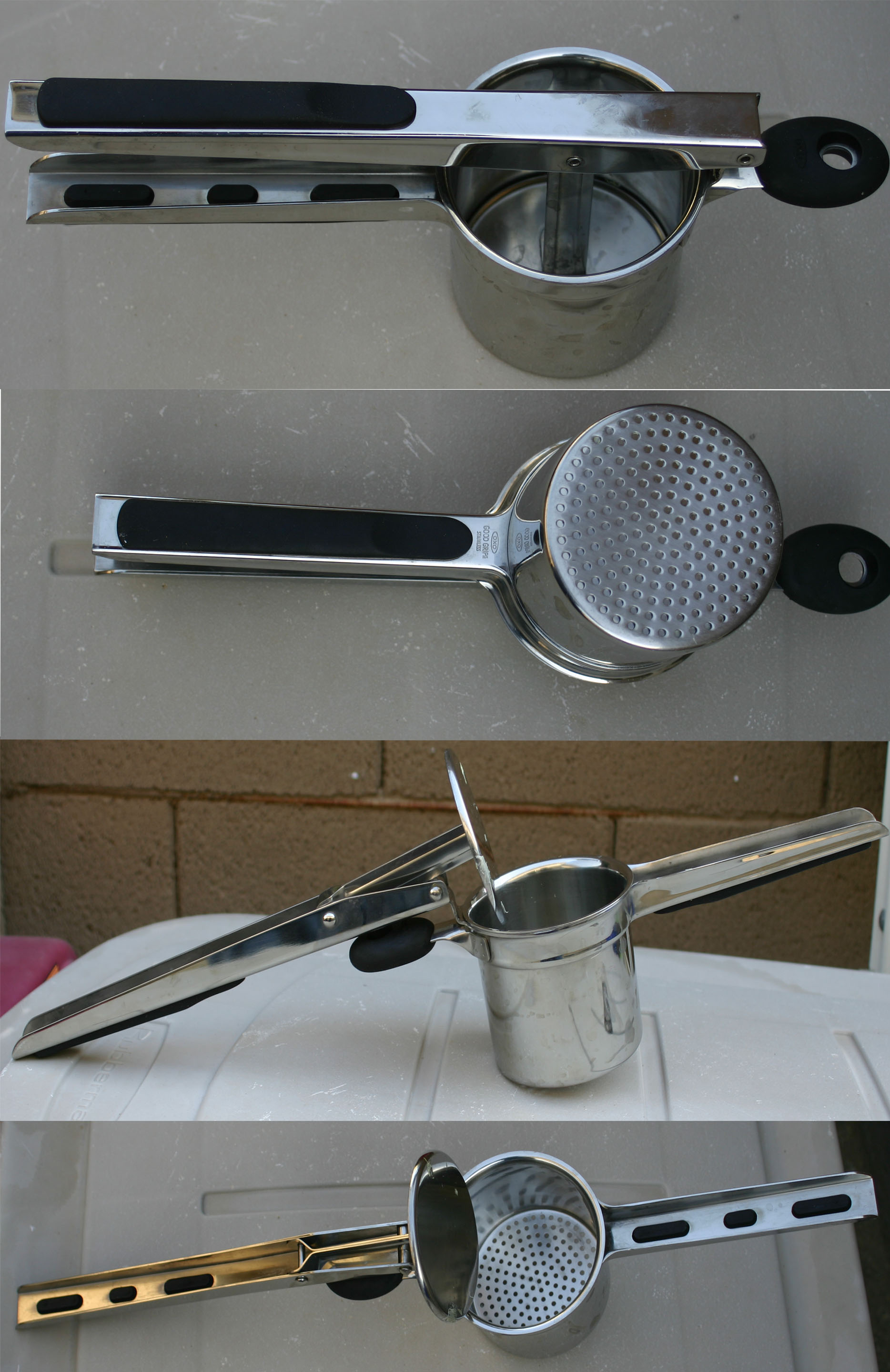
A hand-held potato ricer

Ricing is a cooking term meaning to pass food through a food mill or "ricer", which comes in several forms. In the most basic, food is pushed or pressured through a metal or plastic plate with many small holes, producing a smoother result than mashing, but coarser than pureeing or passing through a sieve or tamis. The size of the product produced by ricing is about the same as grains of rice.

Potatoes are the most commonly "riced" foods, as in the dish riced potatoes, essentially a smoother version of mashed potatoes. However, other vegetables can be 'riced' in order to provide low glycemic, nutrient-rich vegetable dishes, either cooked or raw, with or without sauces and herbs, or in salads. Cooking artfully 'riced' cauliflower, then mashing it before serving, provides a more health-supporting vegetable dish that resembles mashed potatoes.

The potato ricer tool forces vegetables, such as potatoes, through a sheet of small holes. It differs in function somewhat from a food mill, which is larger and not held in one hand.

== See also ==
- Food mill
- List of food preparation utensils
- Potato masher
- Potato ricer - also known as a 'ricer' - is a small, relatively inexpensive kitchen tool
