= Potato ricer =

Kitchen tool used to process potatoes or other food

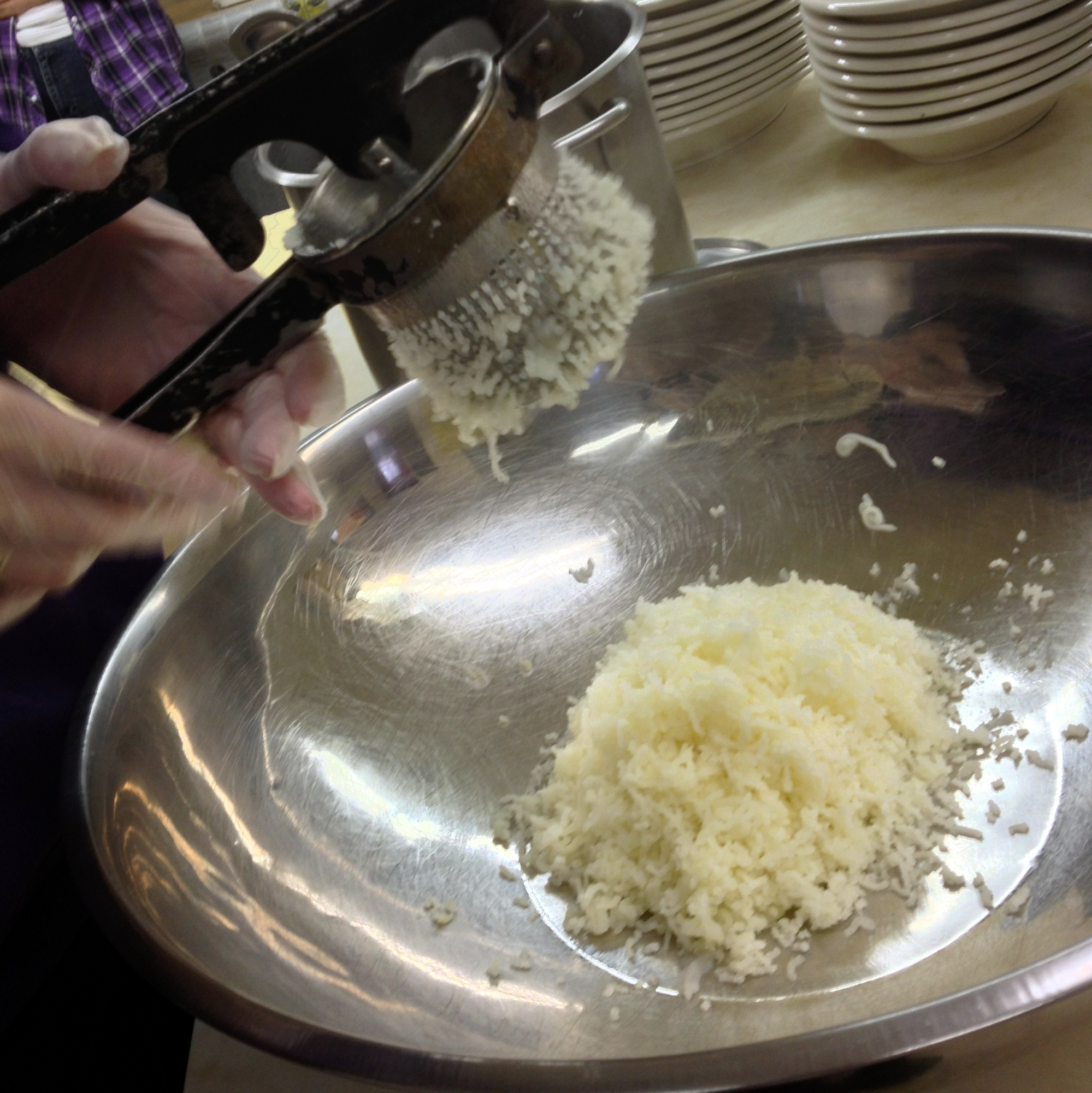
A potato ricer in use

A potato ricer (also called a ricer) is a kitchen implement used to process potatoes or other food by forcing it through a sheet of small holes, which are typically about the diameter of a grain of rice. This form of food processing is called ricing.

== Description ==
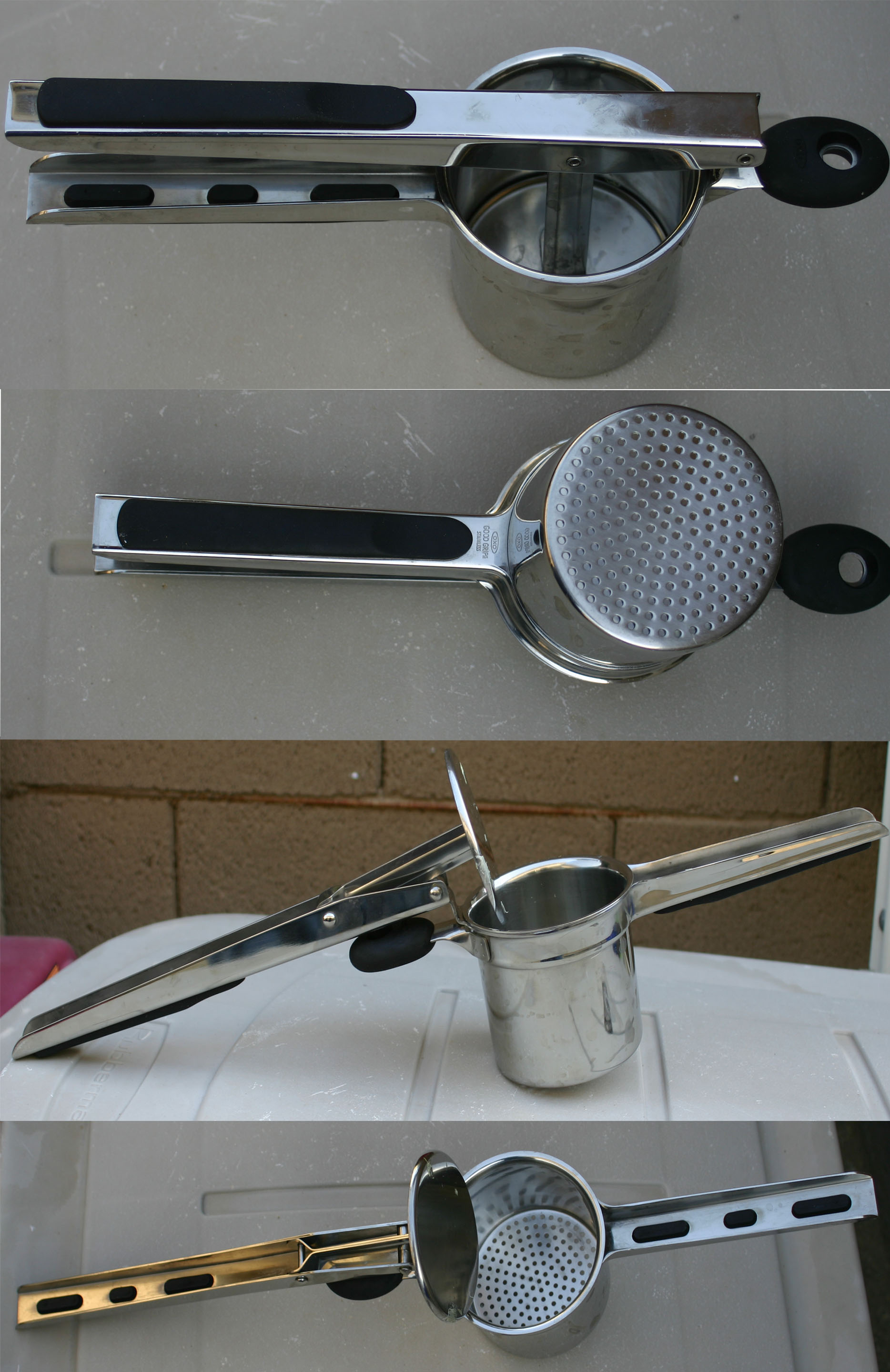
Collage showing a potato ricer from four angles

A common variety of potato ricer resembles a large garlic press. It has two long handles, one with a perforated basket at the end, the other with a flat surface that fits into the basket. The food is placed in the basket, then the flat surface is pushed down into the basket by pressing the handles together, forcing the food through the holes.

Another form, sometimes called a rotary ricer, is cone-shaped with small perforations all around the cone. It comes with a wooden pestle that is used to push the food through the holes.

A food mill can be used as a substitute for a ricer.

== Uses ==
This tool is commonly used to rice potatoes, a process that forces cooked potatoes through the ricer and turns the potatoes into fine, thin shreds. The resulting potatoes are lighter and fluffier. The process allows the full starch cells of high-starch potatoes to maintain their integrity and stay separate, giving the potatoes a fluffy, full texture. At this point, milk, butter, and other additives can easily be blended to maintain the starch structure, the result being consistent mashed potatoes. The process works since uniform texture is created due to the passing of potatoes through evenly sized holes, which ensures that the potatoes are smashed only once. With this method, the cell walls are much less likely to break open.

Pressing cooked vegetables and fruits through the small holes produces a purée comparable to using a drum sieve. Many foods can now be pureed more easily in a food processor; however, a manual method such as ricing is best for potatoes, which are starchy and become glutinous (in the sense of being glue-like or sticky, and not in the sense of containing gluten) when over-processed. Ricers are often used to puree food for babies.

A ricer can be used to remove excess water from foods such as cooked greens that are to be added to quiche, thawed frozen spinach, and sliced or grated potatoes to improve the quality of potato chips or hash browns made from them.

Ricers are also used to make Mont Blanc (a dessert of chestnut puree), lefse (a Norwegian flatbread), spätzle (German noodles), passatelli (a type of Italian pasta), and process ice cream when making the German dish spaghettieis.

Potters and ceramicists use ricers to extrude "hair" for sculptures of humans or animals such as sheep.

== See also ==
- List of food preparation utensils
- Potato masher
- Food mill
