= Church penitentiary =

British charitable organization

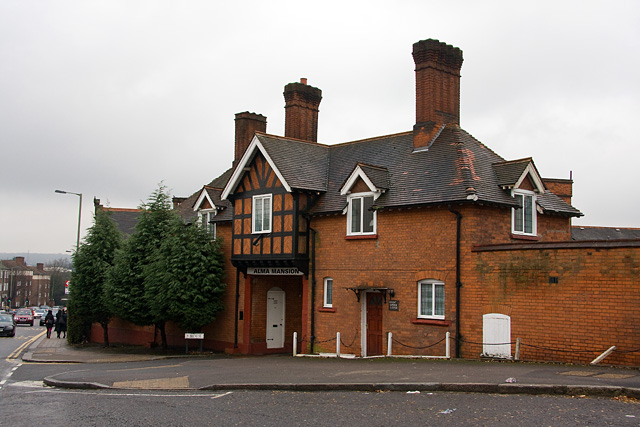
Alma Mansion, Barnet, formerly St Saviour's Homes

The original church penitentiary for the reclamation of fallen women was founded in 1806 in London. There most well known centre was set up by then future British prime minister William Ewart Gladstone in 1848. Its aim was the convent-based rehabilitation of women, including prostitutes, thieves, the homeless, alcoholics etc. They were charitable organisations and not in place for the punishment of crimes.

The Church Penitentiary Association existed from 1852 until 1951. There are records on the association in the Library at Lambeth Palace, the seat of the Archbishop of Canterbury in London, and in the National Archives.

These also have holdings on related societies such as the Navvy Mission Society (now Industrial Christian Fellowship), the Temperance Council of the Christian Churches (now the Churches Council on Alcohol and Drugs) the Church of England Council for Social Aid, the Band of Hope (1855–1990), and the Church Moral Aid Society (1852–1892).

Rescue work for unmarried mothers:

An example of a nonconformist institution of this kind is the Manchester and Salford Asylum for female penitents, Embden Place Greenheys.

== See also ==
- Drug rehabilitation
- Homelessness
- Occupational therapy
- Penology
- Prostitution
- Rehabilitation (penology)
