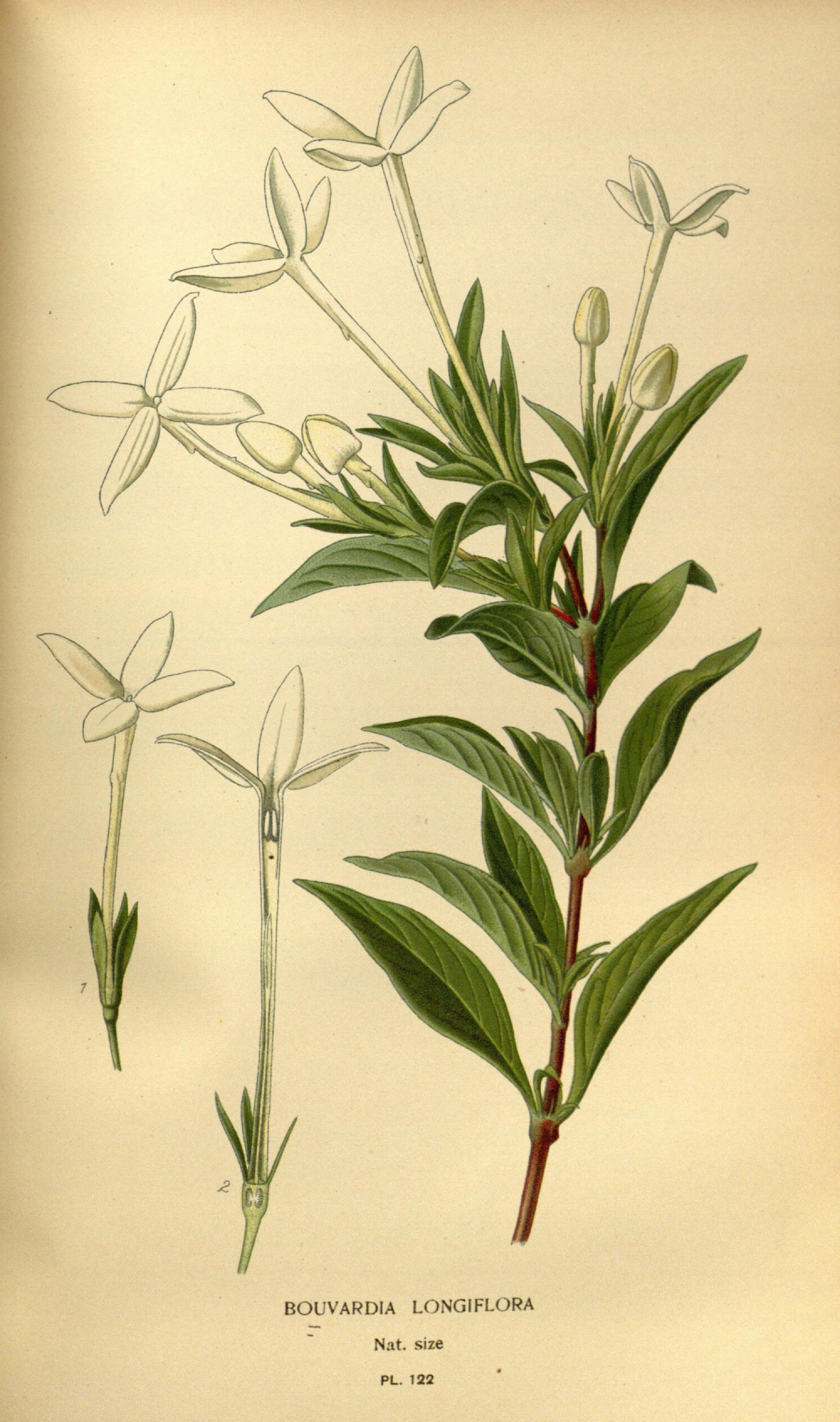

Scientific classification
- Kingdom: Plantae
- Clade: Tracheophytes
- Clade: Angiosperms
- Clade: Eudicots
- Clade: Asterids
- Order: Gentianales
- Family: Rubiaceae
- Genus: Bouvardia
- Species: B. longiflora

Binomial name
- Bouvardia longiflora (Cav.) Kunth

Synonyms
- Aeginetia longiflora Cav., 1801; Anotis longiflora (Cav.) Benth., 1839. Houstonia longiflora (Cav.) A.Gray, 1860. Bouvardia longiflora var. latifolia M.Martens & Galeotti, 1844. Bouvardia humboldtii Hend. & Andr.Hend., 1861. Bouvardia carmea B.S.Williams, 1869. Bouvardia delicata B.S.Williams, 1869. Bouvardia jasminoides Hend. & Andr.Hend., 1870. Bouvardia jasminoides compacta Hend. & Andr.Hend., 1870.

= Bouvardia longiflora =

Species of plant

Bouvardia longiflora, commonly known as the scented bouvardia, is a species of flowering plant in the family Rubiaceae. It is first described by Spanish botanist Antonio José Cavanilles in 1801 from a specimen in the collection of Luis Née. The holotype specimen is from a location between Querétaro and Guanajuato.

The most commonly cultivated member of the genus, it is grown for its scent. It grows in sheltered spots in the garden with good drainage. The scent is most prominent in the evenings. They can withstand a winter minimum of 50 F.
