= Violet Crowther =

British museum curator

- Born: 14 February 1884; Leeds, England, United Kingdom of Great Britain and Ireland
- Died: 25 June 1969 (aged 85); Bramley, Leeds, England, United Kingdom
- Citizenship: British
- Occupation: Curator
- Employer: Abbey House Museum
- Parent: Henry Crowther

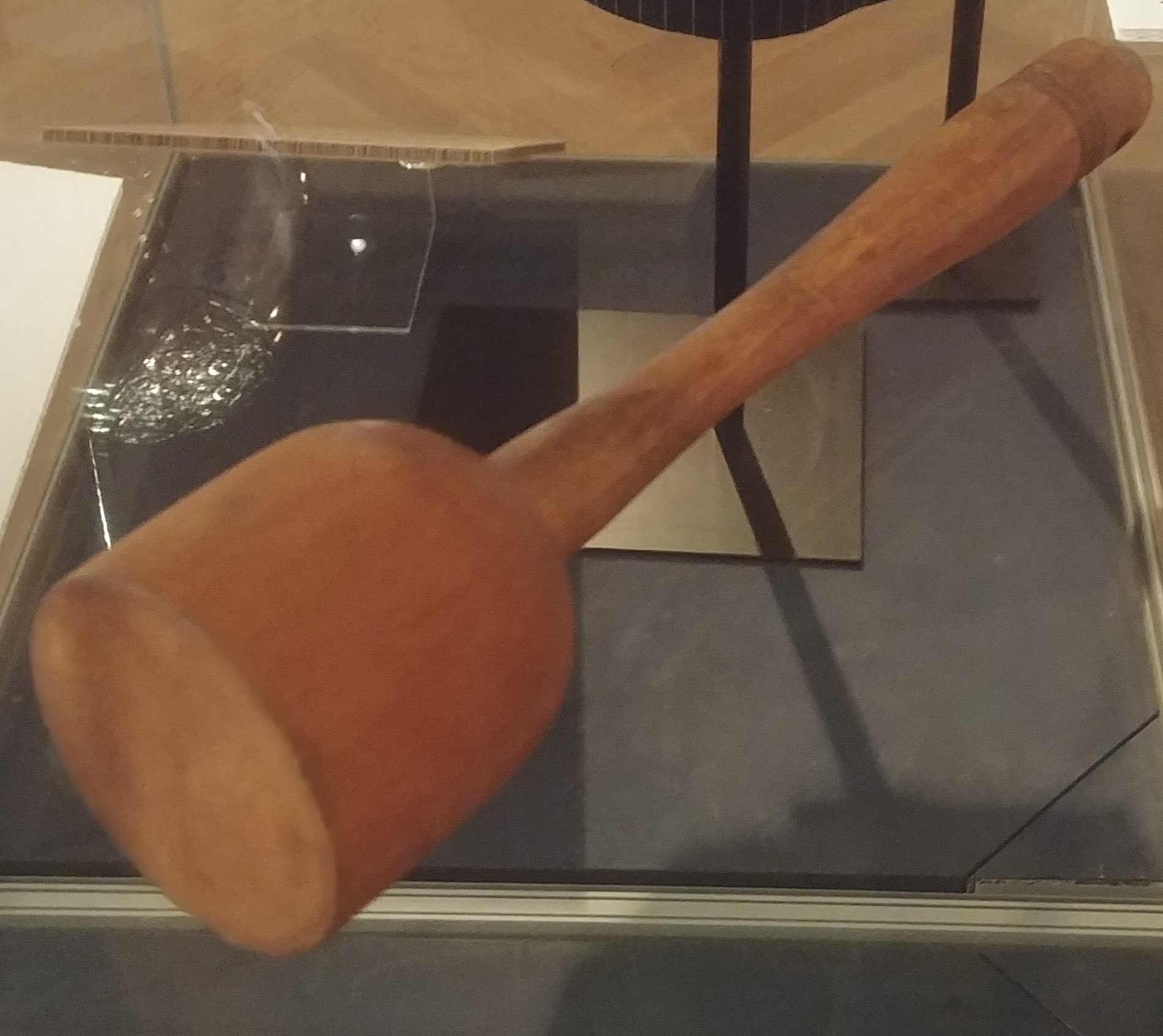
Nineteenth century potato masher acquired by Violet Crowther for Abbey House Museum

Violet Mary Crowther (14 February 1884 – 25 June 1969) was a British museum curator. She was the Assistant Curator at the Abbey House Museum for more than two decades.

== Biography ==
Violet Mary Crowther was born on 14 February 1884 in Leeds, Yorkshire, the daughter of Henry Crowther, a natural historian and museum curator, and his wife Martha. Along with her sisters Virté and Vera, she helped her father in his museum work, and built up expertise in natural history. Her father and sisters were active participants in local nature study groups, where Violet demonstrated her skill in using a microscope and lectured on natural history topics such as 'The Scarabaeus and Other Dung-Beetles'.

As Curator of the Museum of the Leeds Philosophical and Literary Society, her father gave frequent lectures to public audiences, including schoolchildren, which were illustrated by lantern slides. Violet helped with these presentations by hand-colouring the slides and preparing diagrams. She also played a key role in running the Leeds Schools' Museum Scheme in the early 20th century, helping to deliver a programme of lectures and visits by children and their teachers. This was an innovative approach which supported children's learning through access to museum collections, reaching thousands of children across Leeds every year, and anticipated the later development of partnerships between museums and local education authorities across the country.

== Career ==
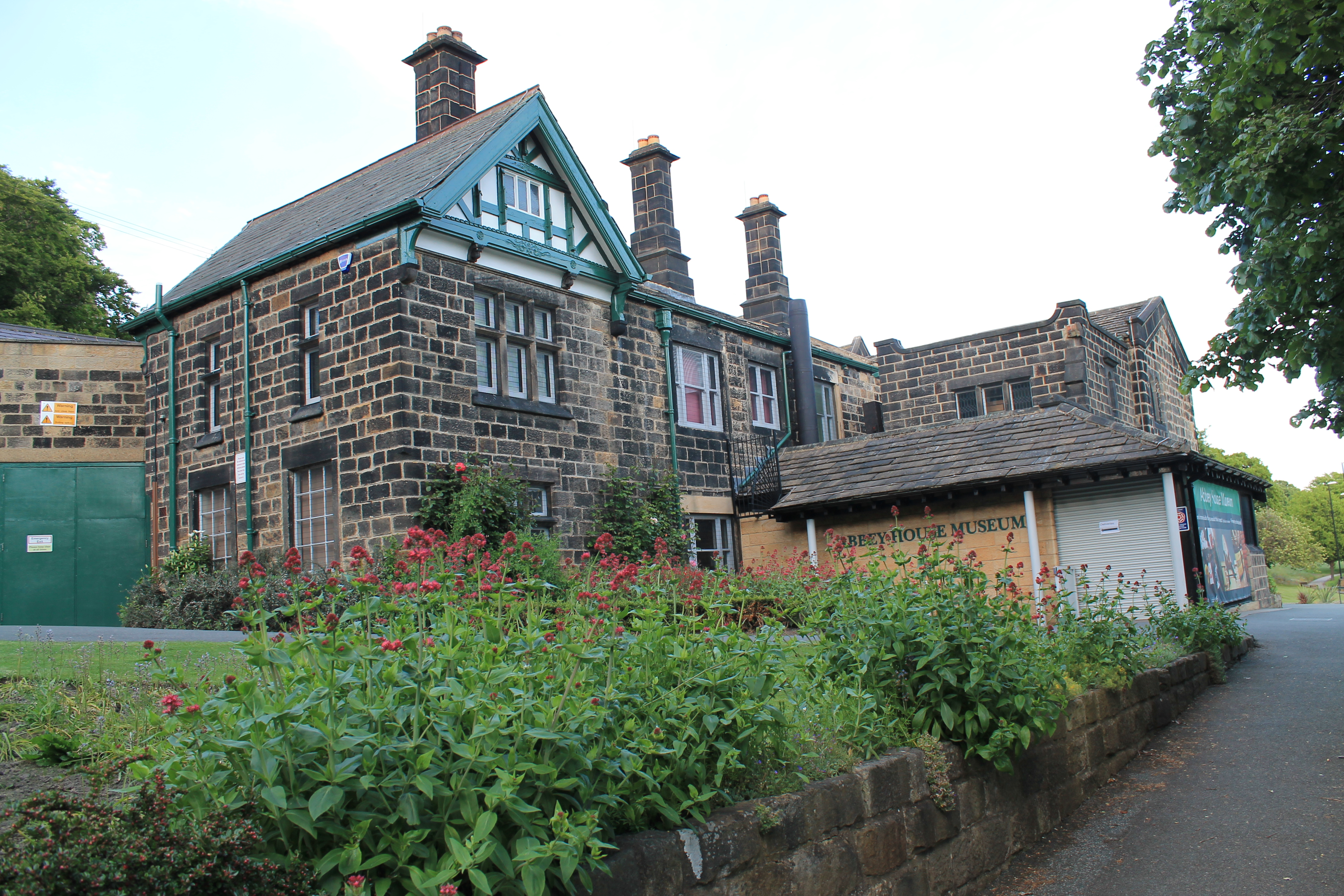
Abbey House Museum

Crowther assisted her father in beginning the Leeds collections of "bygones" or social history material, reflecting wider changes in museum practice to move beyond "scientific" collections towards the familial and domestic. The Museum of the Leeds Philosophical and Literary Society passed into public ownership in 1921, and Crowther was appointed Assistant Curator. In 1927 it was decided that Abbey House Museum in Leeds should become a museum of "bygones", and Crowther took charge of these collections as well. She called for donations of household objects such as bellows in the women's pages of the local press.

Through her leadership of Abbey House Museum, Crowther made a significant and lasting contribution to the social history collections which today are displayed there. Previously designated as "bygones", everyday domestic objects which had passed out of general use, these collections are important in commemorating the lives and experiences of ordinary people, especially women, and creating a strong sense of place and rootedness in local history.

Crowther retired from her post as Assistant Curator on 14 February 1949, after 48 years working in museums in Leeds, and 21 years at Abbey House. She died in Bramley, Leeds, on 25 June 1969.

== Legacy ==
Like many women working in museums in this period, Crowther achieved little professional recognition for her expertise, and was largely overlooked in contemporary accounts of museum practice; this has begun to be addressed in modern scholarship. It is therefore the more impressive that she gained the post of Assistant Curator, and was acknowledged as such in official Museums Association publications, although her range of responsibilities at Abbey House Museum merited the title of full Curator.

Crowther's name is one of those featured on the sculpture Ribbons, unveiled in 2024.
