= Leeds Discovery Centre =

Museum storage facility in Leeds, UK

Leeds Discovery Centre is the purpose-built display storage facility built for Leeds Museums & Galleries in 2007. It was funded by Leeds City Council and the National Lottery Heritage Fund. The facility stores over one million objects in climate-controlled conditions and hosts regular tours.

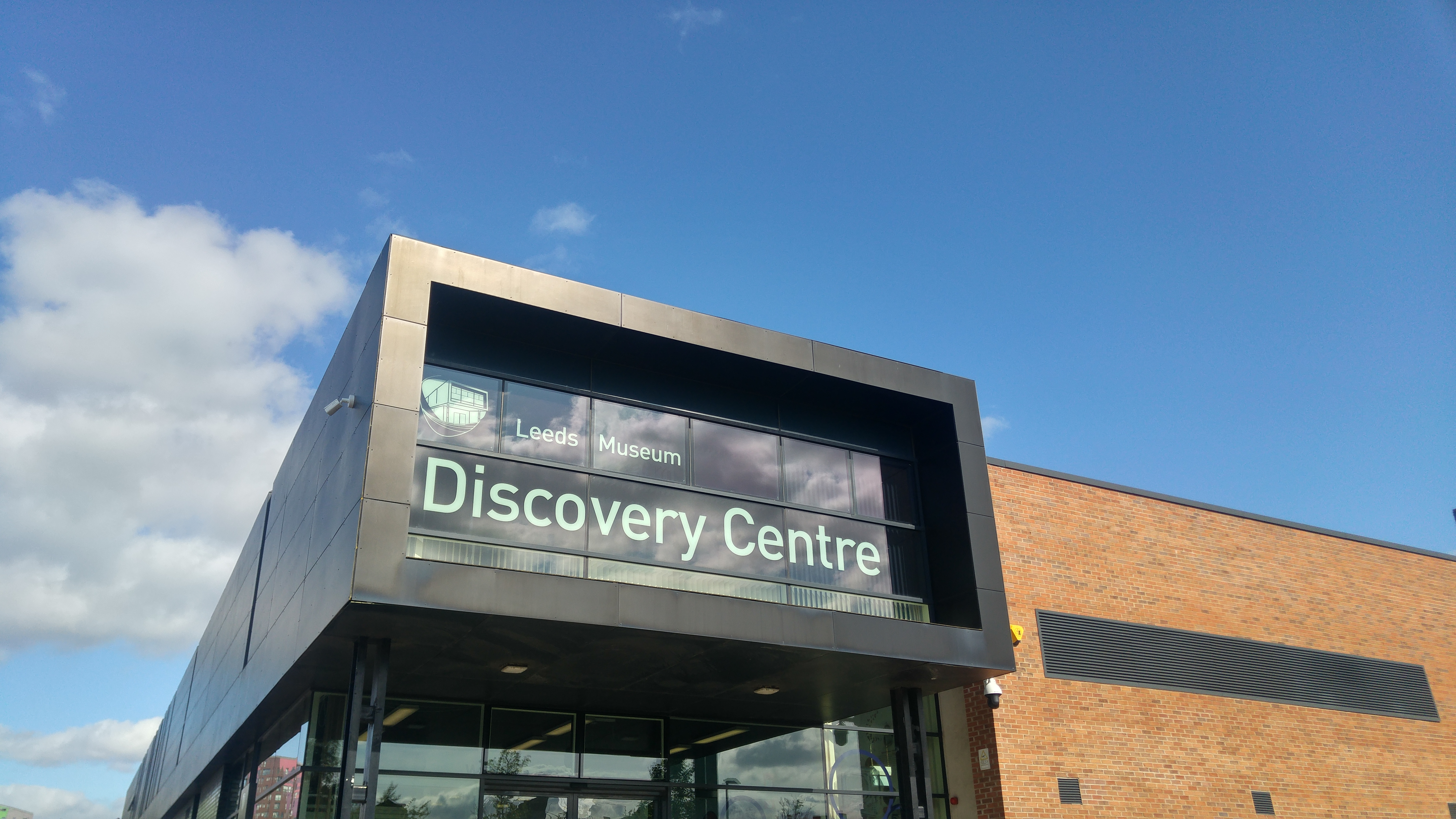
Outside of Leeds Discovery Centre

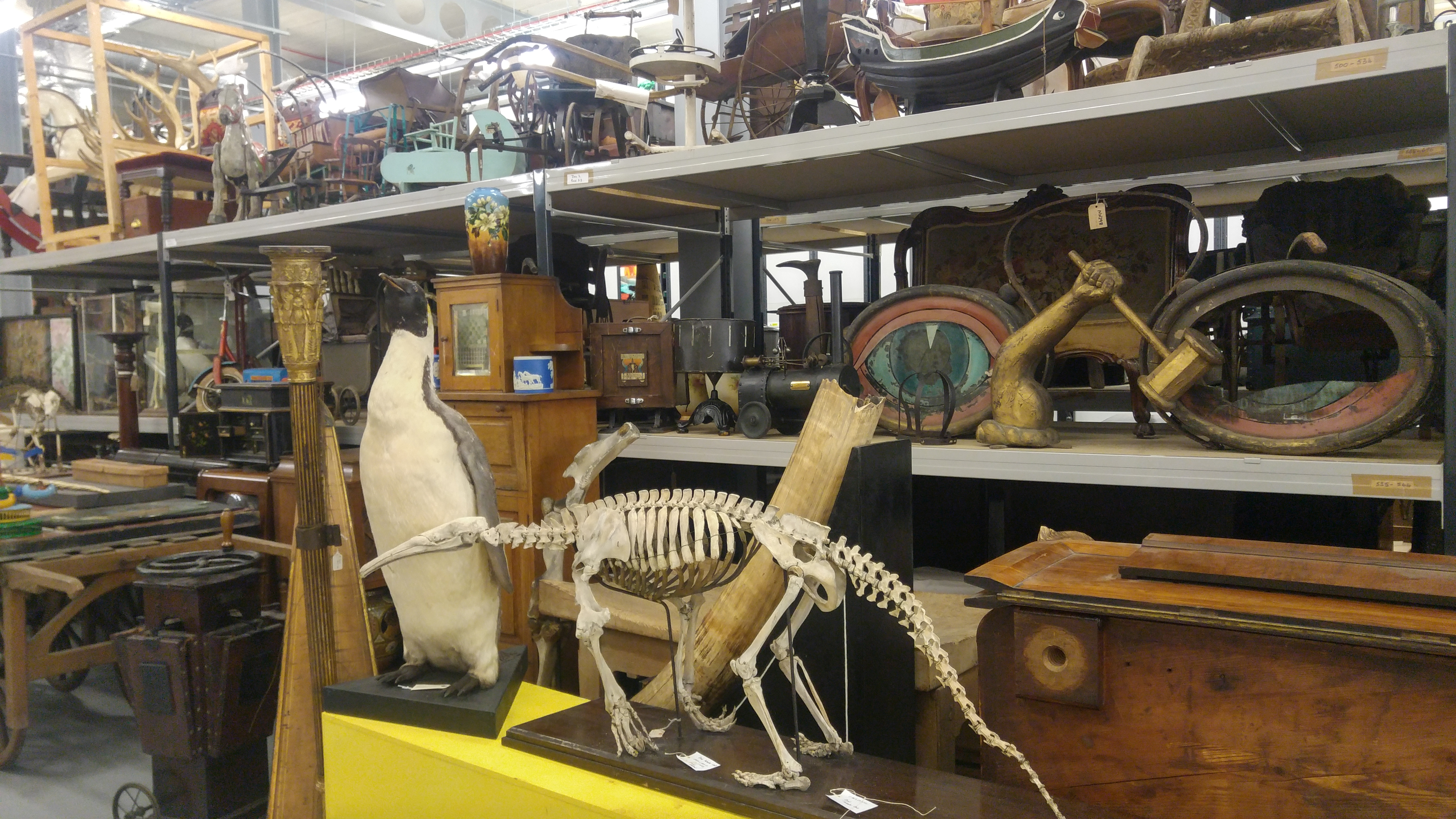
Inside Leeds Discovery Centre

Collections stored here include: natural science specimens, social history (including historic board games), textiles, world cultures and archaeology (including Anglo-Saxon sculpture). Objects from different collections areas are displayed alongside each other to maximize visual impact. In 2018, the learning team was awarded The Sandford Award for Excellence in Heritage Learning. The Discovery Centre runs events including art classes.
