= Kirkstall Forge =

Mixed-use development in Leeds, England

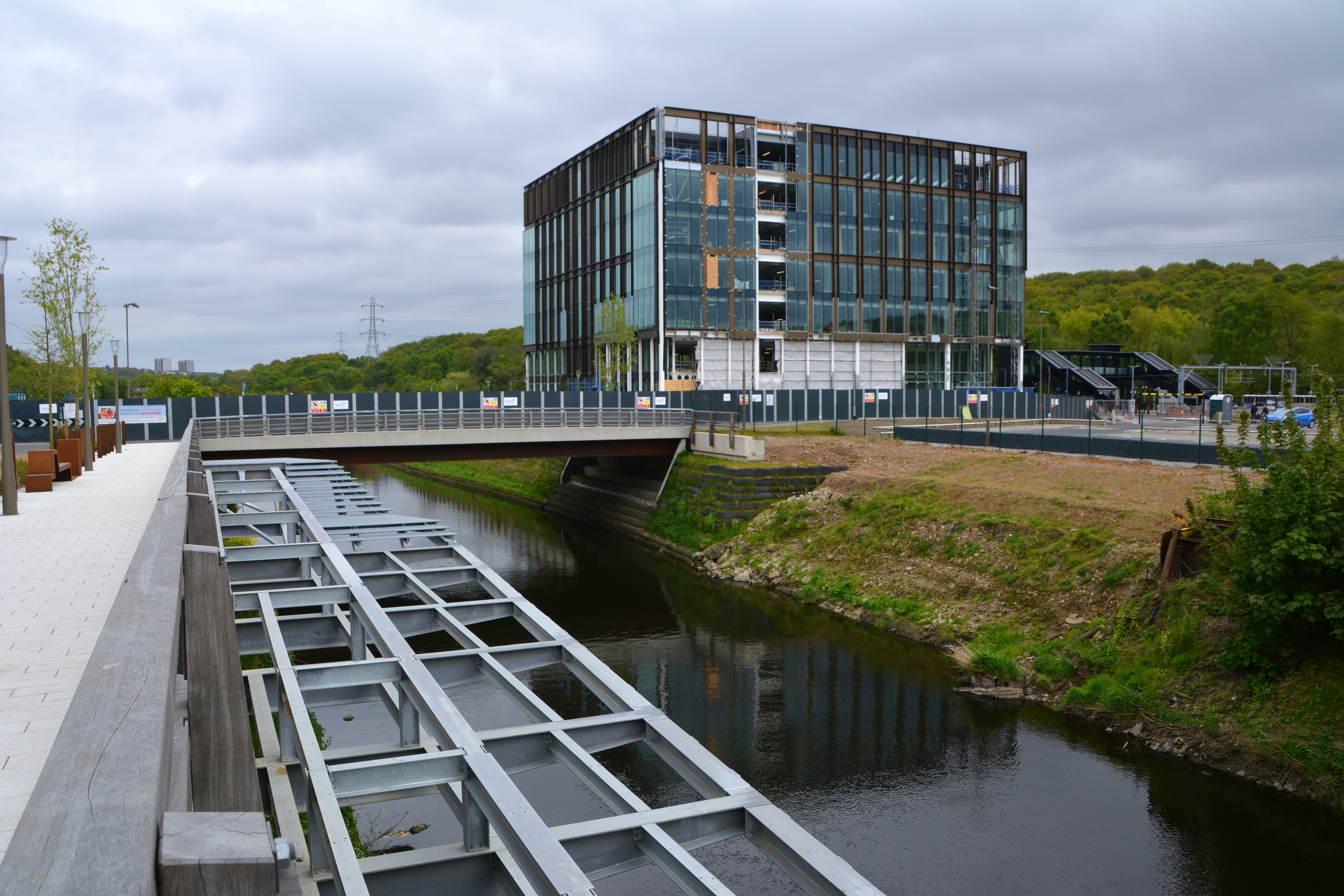
Office development at Number One Kirkstall Forge

Kirkstall Forge is a 57-acre mixed-use development located in Kirkstall in Leeds, West Yorkshire. The site is one of the oldest most continuously used industrial sites in England. It was operated by Kirkstall Forge Engineering, a metalworking business. It was a working forge until 1995 when the site was bought by Commercial Estates Group who have had plans approved to build 1,050 homes, 300,000 sq ft of office space, 100,000 sq ft of leisure and retail and a primary school. In June 2016 a railway station was opened on the site served by trains between Leeds and Bradford.

In the 19th century, as well as ironforging, the metalworking business produced axles for horse-drawn vehicles. As motor vehicles became more common, in the early 20th century, the forge specialised in motor vehicle axles and in steel bar. During the First World War, forging was stopped, allowing the business to concentrate on axle production. During the Second World War, production expanded to meet the demand for military vehicles, and the site was camouflaged to reduce the risk of bombing raids.

== History ==
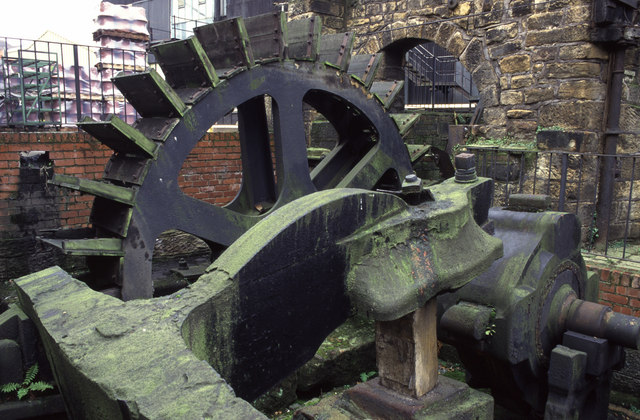
A hammer at Kirkstall Forge

The history of the forge can be dated to a 12th-century (1151 A.D.) mill race which powered a corn mill for the monks of Kirkstall Abbey. Iron production began in the 16th century, making it the oldest forge in England.

== Butler family ==
The Butler family were involved for six generations from 1779 in the management of the Forge and eventually purchased it in 1893 from the Cardigan Estate for £12,000. In 1779 John and Thomas Butler took over the lease with George and Betty Beecroft, at her instigation. It was in need of investment and regeneration. They invested the sum of £1,000 (roughly £12,760,000 in today's money), which had been agreed between the Butlers and Beecrofts before they took the lease.

Ambrose Butler (1816–1883), grandson of John Butler, joined the partnership in 1831 aged just 15 as an assistant to his uncle George Skirrow Beecroft, alongside his brother John in 1839. They alongside their brother Thomas later bought out George in 1855 for £71,200. Ambrose focused particularly on cart axle production, re-equipping the facilities on site to enable high-volume production of standardised products. By 1876 cart axles, and railway wheels and axles represented between 30 and 40% of the company turnover with Ambrose's sons, Edmund, Bernard and Hugh all now working at the Forge.

Ambrose bought two patents for a machine that could straighten out bars, and made them more round than ordinary rolled iron bars. These were known as "reeled bars" and were exhibited all over the world. Kirkstall Forge, then known as Beecroft, Butler & Co. manufactured and exhibited railway wheels and axles at the Great Exhibition in 1851 in Class V and won an award.

In 1851 the forge changed its name, and Beecroft, Butler and Co became the Kirkstall Forge Company.

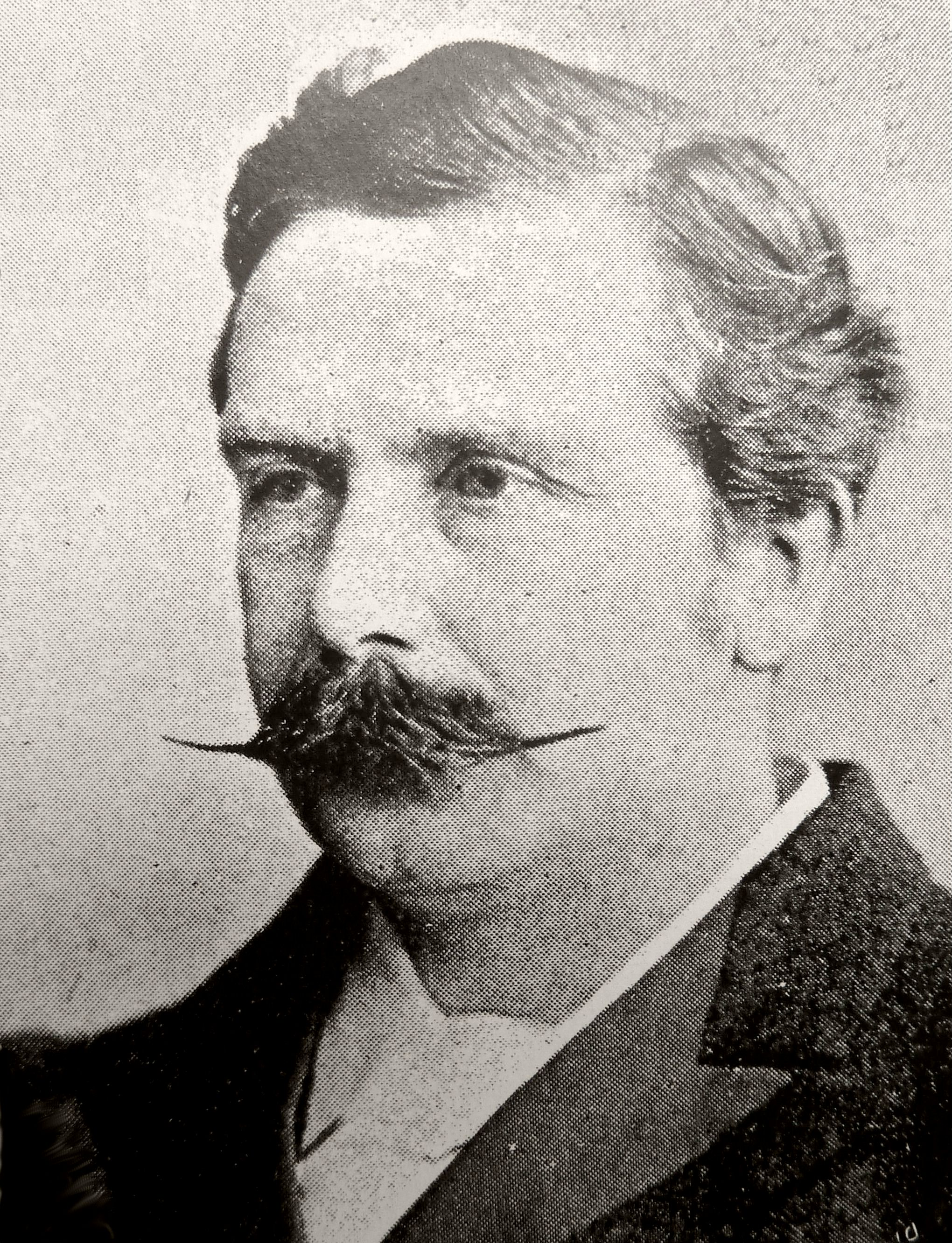
Ambrose Edmund Butler (born 1848)

Ambrose Edmund Butler (1848–1923) had been involved in the management of the Forge under the guidance of his father Ambrose and his uncle John Butler. In 1876 he was asked to read a paper before the meeting of British Iron and Steel Institute in Leeds about the new process of "reeling bars" that had been developed under his father Ambrose. The members visited Kirkstall Forge the next day. In 1883 Ambrose senior and his brother John died within two months of each other leaving the Forge with a bank overdraft of £59,000. The industry changed with an increasing move to steel, reducing the demand for wrought iron and it took a savvy agreement with the Cardigan Estate to reduce the rent from £800 per year to £350 to ensure the survival of the company. Ambrose senior had fought to preserve the firm in his later years but it was largely due to Ambrose Edmund's grit and determination that it survived and prospered. He was ably helped by his younger brothers Bernard and Hugh who all worked enormously hard during these years.

It was under Ambrose Edmund that innovation and investment returned to Kirkstall Forge and by 1892 the company had produced bright steel bars that were the first to be produced commercially in the UK and were an immediate success. The bright steel bar production consolidated the firm's recovery in the face of a worldwide decline in wrought iron which affected its key markets in railway products. Ambrose Edmund became Lord Mayor of Leeds from 1901 to 1902.

During the First World War, forging was stopped, allowing the business to concentrate on axle production. During the Second World War, production expanded to meet the demand for military vehicles, and the site was camouflaged to reduce the risk of bombing raids. During World War II, many bombing raids were carried out along the Aire Valley.

In 1964, Kirkstall Forge bought the Regent Axle company based in Burnley to expand its gear machining capabilities. In 1974, Kirkstall Forge Engineering was bought by GKN.

In 1995 the business was taken over by the Dana corporation (Dana Spicer Europe Ltd), who over the following 6 years transferred production overseas, and closed the works, making 1500 staff redundant.

The site was then bought by Commercial Estates Group in 2005 and planning permission was granted for outline planning on 20 July 2007. In April 2011, Commercial Estates Group applied for an extension of the planning permission granted.

== Railway station ==
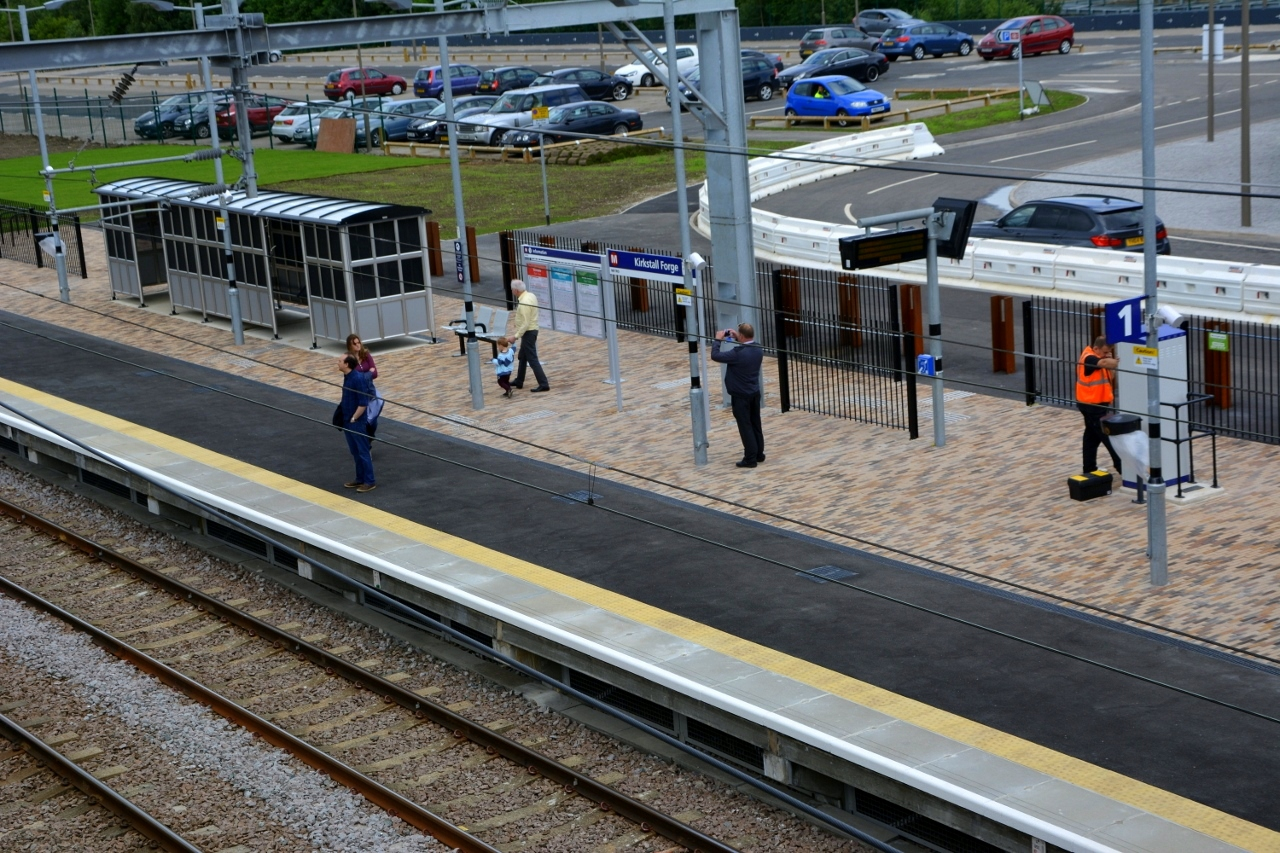
The new Kirkstall Forge station

A new on-site Kirkstall Forge railway station was opened on 19 June 2016 near the site of an earlier station, Newlay & Horsforth railway station.

== Commercial uses ==
In 2016 construction began on the first office building, which was completed in November 2017. The new building is named Number One and was occupied by Zenith Vehicle Contracts Ltd, Bupa, Mercedes-Benz Vans and CEG. Butler's, a bar/restaurant, opened in November 2017 on the ground floor of Number One, named after the Butler family who were involved with the management of the Forge for over six generations.

== Housing ==
There is planning permission for 1,050 new homes.

== See also ==
- Listed buildings in Leeds (Kirkstall Ward)
