= Hawksworth, Leeds =

Coordinates: 53.830°N 1.613°W

Hawksworth
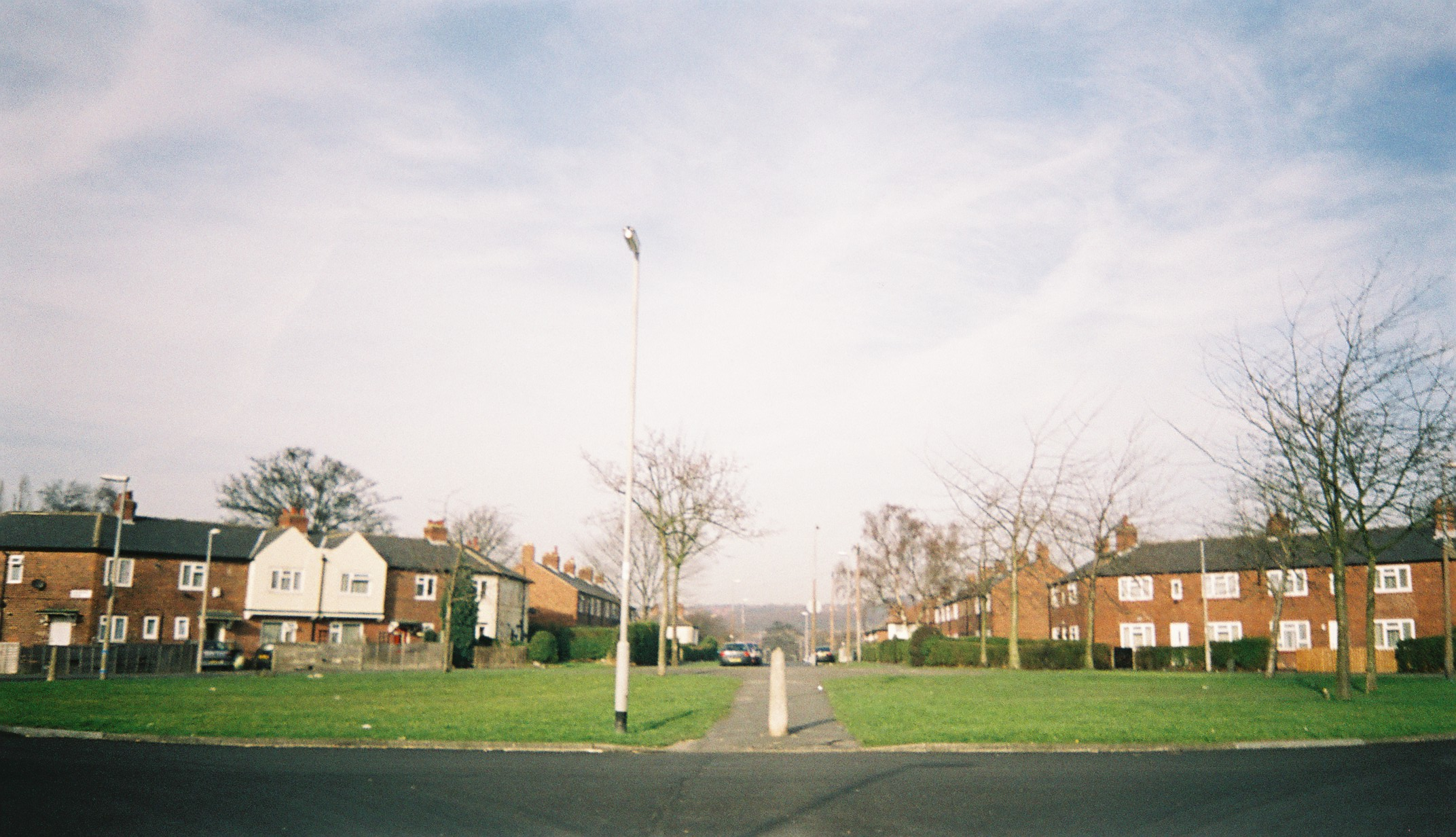
- The Broadway, Hawksworth

- Location within West Yorkshire
- OS grid reference: SE254369
- Metropolitan borough: City of Leeds
- Metropolitan county: West Yorkshire
- Region: Yorkshire and the Humber
- Country: England
- Sovereign state: United Kingdom
- Postcode district: LS5
- Police: West Yorkshire
- Fire: West Yorkshire
- Ambulance: Yorkshire
- UK Parliament: Leeds Central and Headingley

Hawksworth is a residential area in the Kirkstall ward of Leeds, West Yorkshire, England. It is an early twentieth-century council estate located on a hill between West Park and Horsforth, and is bordered by Butcher Hill, the A65 road and Vesper Road.

The area lies within the LS5 postcode district and is part of the Kirkstall area of Leeds.

The estate is sometimes locally referred to by informal names such as "The Hawky" or "The Hawk", although these names require reliable sourcing.

== Etymology ==
The name Hawksworth appears to have been given to the estate as recently as its foundation in the twentieth century, and is not covered by the relevant English Place Name Society surveys.

The name Hawksworth Wood probably refers to the wood that stood to the west of Kirkstall Abbey. It provided shelter, fuel, pannage and building resources such as thatch for the abbey.

== History ==
After the First World War, councils were encouraged to build 'Homes fit for Heroes', and by 1930 7,000 new council houses had been built in Leeds, on estates which included the Hawksworth Wood.

The woodland around the Hawksworth estate lies within the framework of the Upper Aire Valley. Parts of these sites were formerly quarried or gleaned for millstone grit but have now reverted to woodland and scrub.

The woodlands are predominantly mixed broadleaves mainly containing oak and sycamore, with the understories consisting of rowan, hazel, holly and guelder rose. Small pockets of heather can also be found. These woodlands provide considerable colour and diversity to this suburban and formerly industrial area and are currently managed to ensure a continuity of multi-aged tree cover. Great Hawksworth has received active management in recent years through the removal of invasive tree species and the promotion of understorey and ground flora.

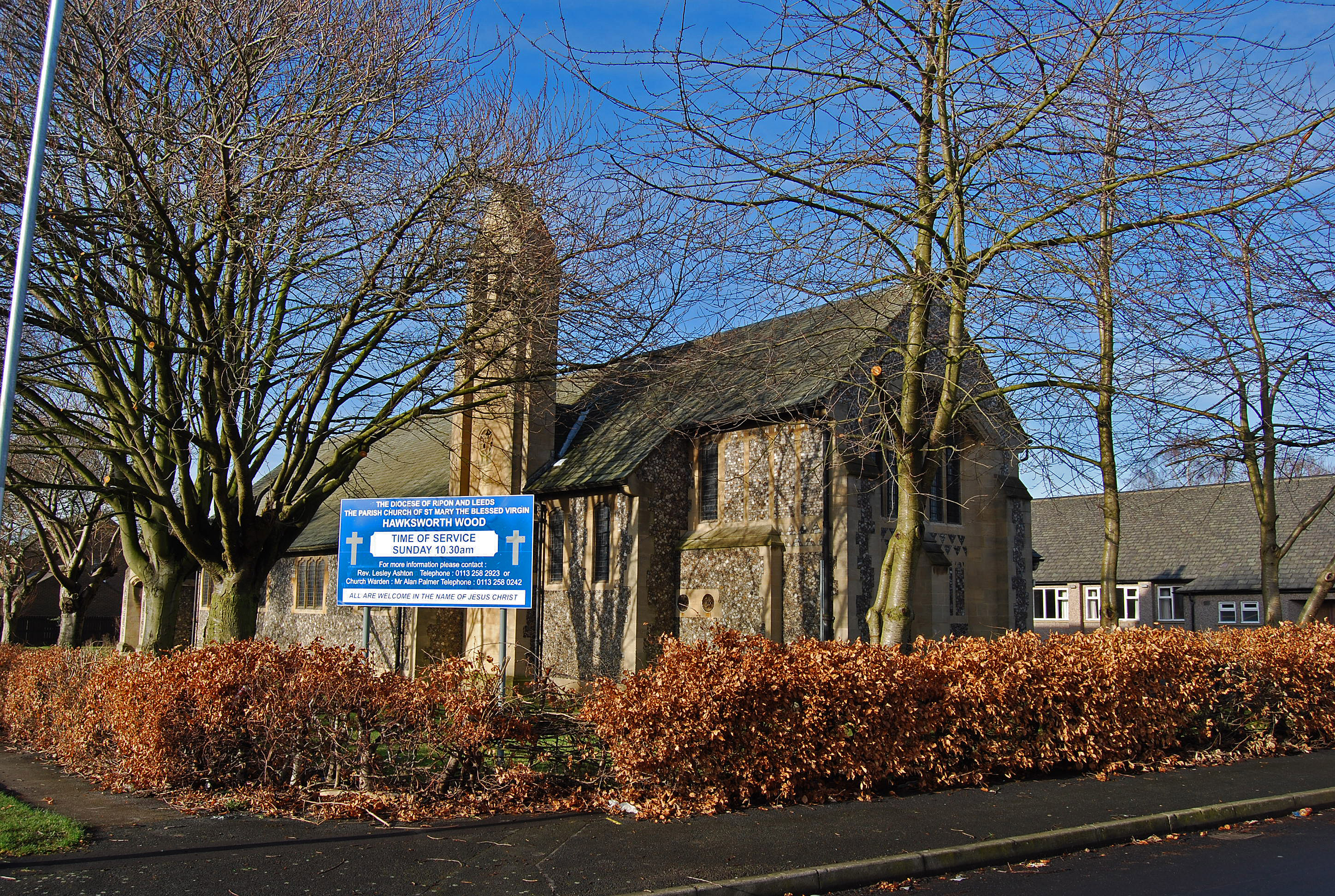
St. Mary's Church

Another interesting fact concerning the area is that the 1933 Penny of George V, a classic rarity, had been placed under the foundation stone of St. Mary's Church in the area. Most accounts indicate that a mere seven pieces were struck for special presentation purposes, and only three currently reside in private collections. In 1933 there was no requirement for the Royal Mint to produce any pennies because there were already enough in circulation. Requests were, however, received for sets of coins dated 1933 to be placed under the foundation stones of buildings erected in that year, and the Mint obliged by striking a small number of coins. The result was to create a rarity that many people thought could turn up in their change.

Reports indicate that in 1970, during construction at Church of St. Cross, Middleton, one of these examples was stolen. In response, the Bishop of Ripon ordered that the St. Mary's Church 1933 Penny be unearthed and sold as a protective measure to prevent its theft.

Numerous public rights of way run through the woods which are accessible via Butcher Hill, Hawksworth Road, New Road Side, Abbey Road, Vesper Road, Cragside Walk and Cragside Close.

There is a metal hatch in Hawksworth Woods which is actually the entrance to an old explosives store from when the woods were once quarried for stone.

== Facilities ==
Hawksworth contains various different shops, including a Co-op, LloydsPharmacy and two small Premier stores. Other facilities include various independent takeaway stores, hairdressing salons and a charity shop.

A Post Office facility was situated on Broadway, however was eventually closed down due to lack of staff willing to operate the premises. An integrated Premier store has since taken over responsibility of main Post Office functions. However, as of July 2021, the postbox outside the previous Broadway premises still remains in use.

Previously there was a pub on Vesper Road titled The Woodway, however this was closed in the 1990s.

== Education ==
=== Primary Education ===
Hawksworth Wood Primary School is the sole primary school on the estate. The school was split into two during the 1970s into Hawksworth Wood Primary and Vesper Gate Middle School. Vesper Gate Middle School has since been redeveloped into Hawksworth Wood Children's Centre. On opening, the children's centre included an adult education facility run by Leeds City College however this closed soon after.

=== Secondary Education ===
Hawksworth does not contain any secondary education facilities itself. However, there are numerous secondary schools around the area where residents may attend, including Abbey Grange Church of England Academy, Lawnswood School and Horsforth School.

== Culture ==
An episode of TV series A Touch of Frost named "Held in Trust", released in 2003, had some scenes filmed at Hawksworth Primary School.

== See also ==
- Listed buildings in Leeds (Kirkstall Ward)
