= St Stephen's Church, Kirkstall =

St. Stephen's Church, Kirkstall
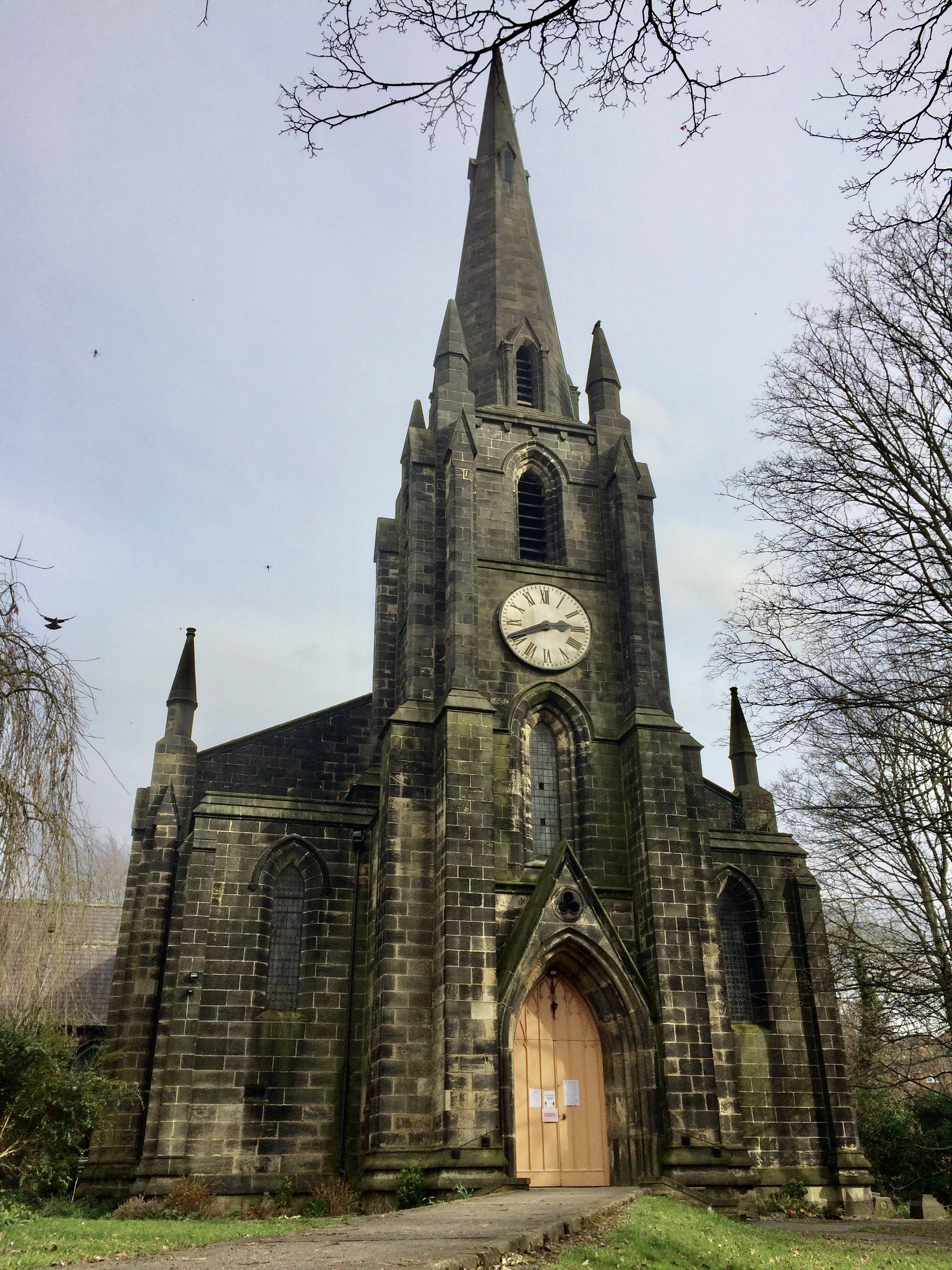
- St. Stephen's Church, Kirkstall
- St. Stephen's Church, Kirkstall
- 53.8180°N 1.5984°W
- Denomination: Church of England
- Churchmanship: Broad Church
- Website: www.kirkstall.church

History
- Dedication: St. Stephen

Administration
- Province: York
- Diocese: Leeds
- Parish: Kirkstall, Leeds

St. Stephen's Church is a Church of England church in Kirkstall, Leeds. The church has been Grade II listed since 5 August 1976.

== Location ==
The church is located on Morris Lane in Kirkstall. The church sits on high ground overlooking Kirkstall Abbey.

== History ==
Construction started in 1828 and the church opened in 1829 having been built by architect Robert Dennis Chantrell, architect of Leeds Parish Church. The church was restored and extended between 1863 and 1864 by architects Perkin and Backhouse of Leeds, with further alterations made in 1874 by Henry Walker.

== Architectural style ==
=== Exterior ===
The church is built to a gothic revival style of hammer-dresses gritstone ashlar and has a slate roof. The nave has five lancet windows. The church has a west tower of three stages with a spire and clock.

=== Interior ===
There is a six-bay nave. The original chancel had two bays; this has been extended to three. There is a wooden reredos depicting saints and a carved square wooden pulpit. The east window is Christ in Glory flanked by St Stephen and St Paul. Carvings dating from the 1864 renovation are by Burstall and Taylor of Leeds, who executed label stop heads, carved corbels and the font.

=== Church hall ===
The church has a separate church hall of mid-twentieth century construction with a barrelled roof. This is not listed.

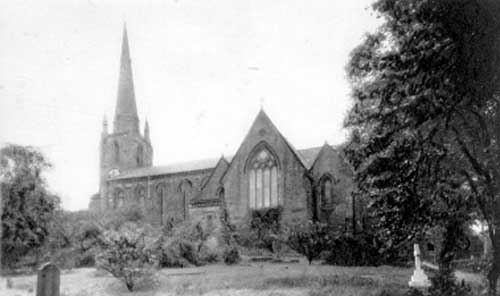
The church prior to 1914.

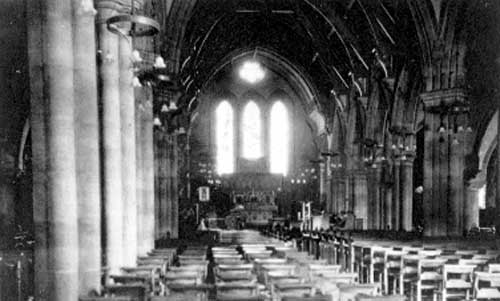
Interior prior to 1914.

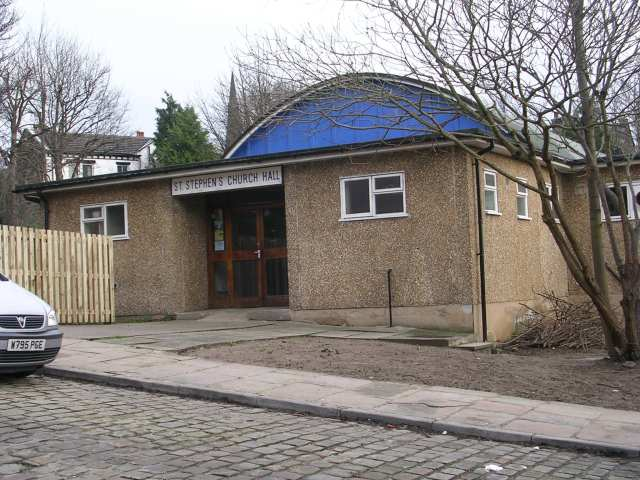
St. Stephen's Church Hall.

== See also ==
- List of places of worship in the City of Leeds
