= Kirkstall =

Suburb of Leeds, West Yorkshire, England

Coordinates: 53.816°N 1.602°W

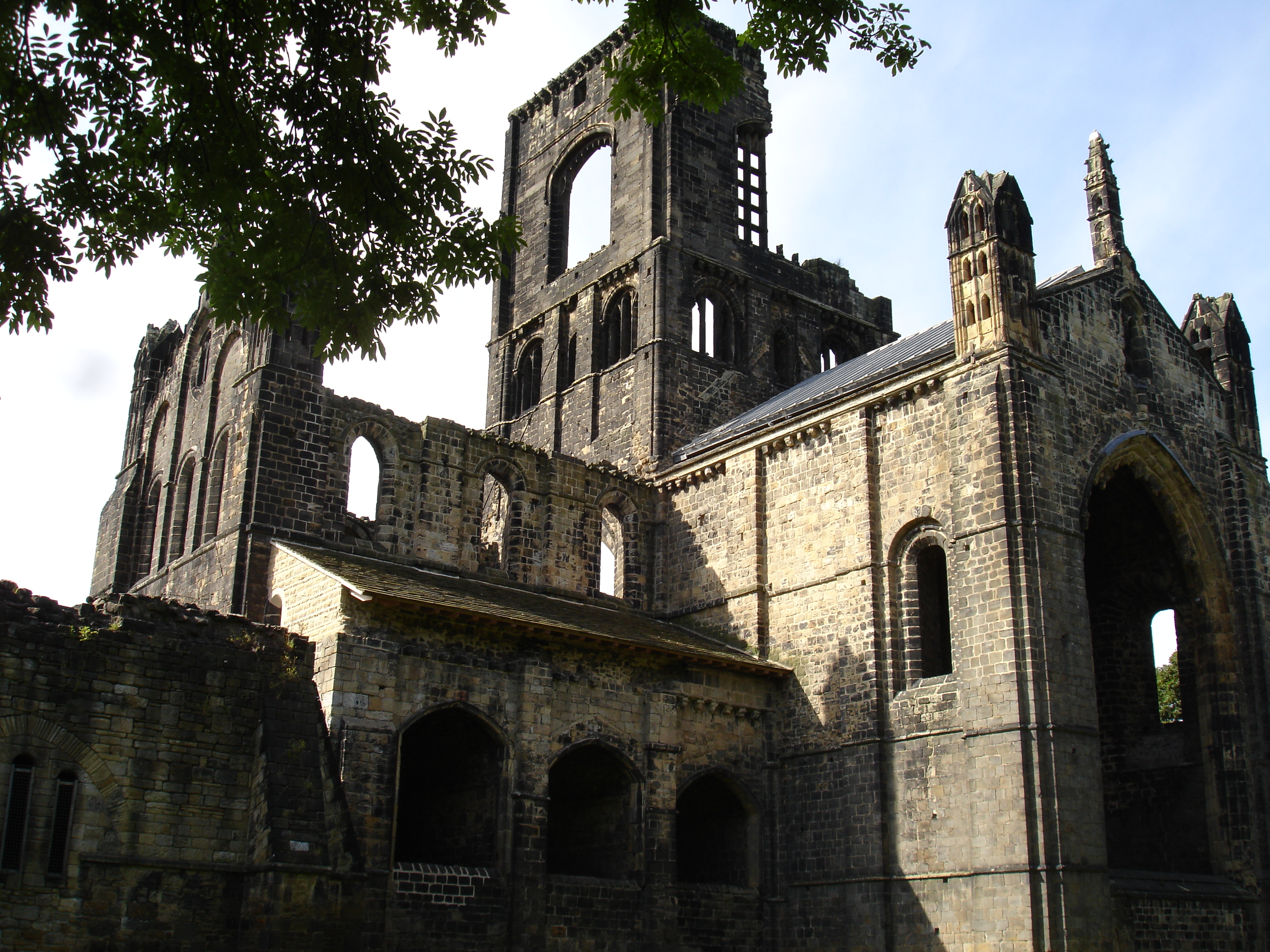
- Kirkstall Abbey

- Location within West Yorkshire
- Population: 20,673
- Metropolitan borough: City of Leeds
- Metropolitan county: West Yorkshire
- Region: Yorkshire and the Humber
- Country: England
- Sovereign state: United Kingdom
- Post town: LEEDS
- Postcode district: LS3, LS4, LS5
- Dialling code: 0113
- Police: West Yorkshire
- Fire: West Yorkshire
- Ambulance: Yorkshire
- UK Parliament: Leeds Central and Headingley

Kirkstall is a north-western suburb of Leeds, West Yorkshire, England, on the eastern side of the River Aire. The area sits in the Kirkstall ward of Leeds City Council and Leeds Central and Headingley parliamentary constituency, represented by Alex Sobel. The population of the ward at the 2011 Census was 21,709.

To the west is Bramley, to the east is Headingley, and to the north are Hawksworth and West Park. Kirkstall is around 2 miles (3.2 km) from the city centre and is close to the University of Leeds and Leeds Beckett University.

In the 12th century Cistercian monks founded Kirkstall Abbey, a daughter house of Fountains Abbey in North Yorkshire, and now Kirkstall's main visitor attraction. The Abbey House Museum opposite the abbey tells the story of the community and the town. Henry De Lacey, Baron of Pontefract, gave the land for the foundation of the abbey, and Kirkstall has a few roads named in his memory. The Abbey Light Railway, which connected the grounds of the abbey with the Bridge Road commercial area, was closed down in 2012. Another landmark is St Stephen's Church, designed by the architect Robert Dennis Chantrell. Richard Oastler, a reformer and fighter for children's rights, is buried in a crypt under the church's east end.

== History ==
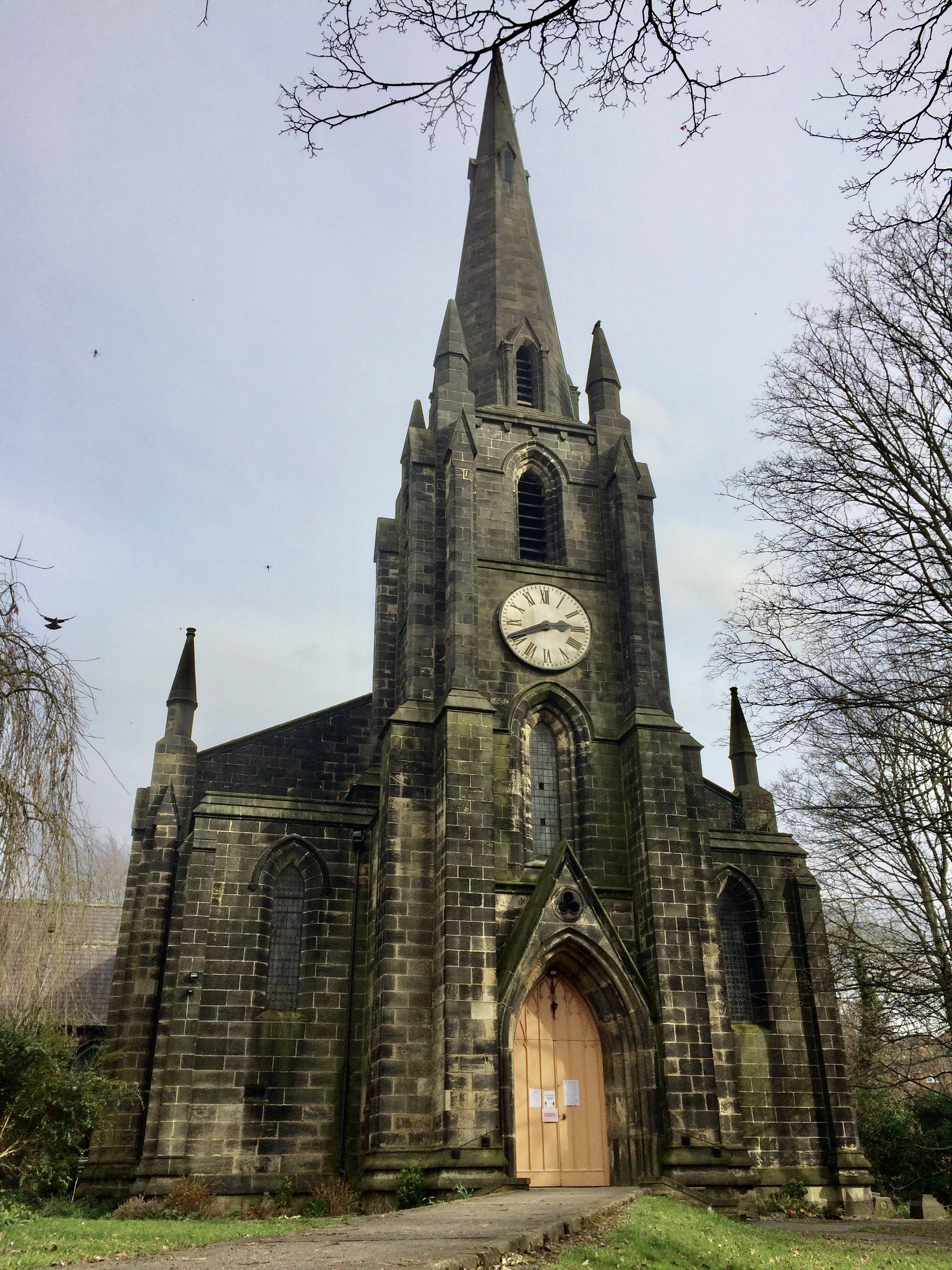
St Stephen's, Kirkstall

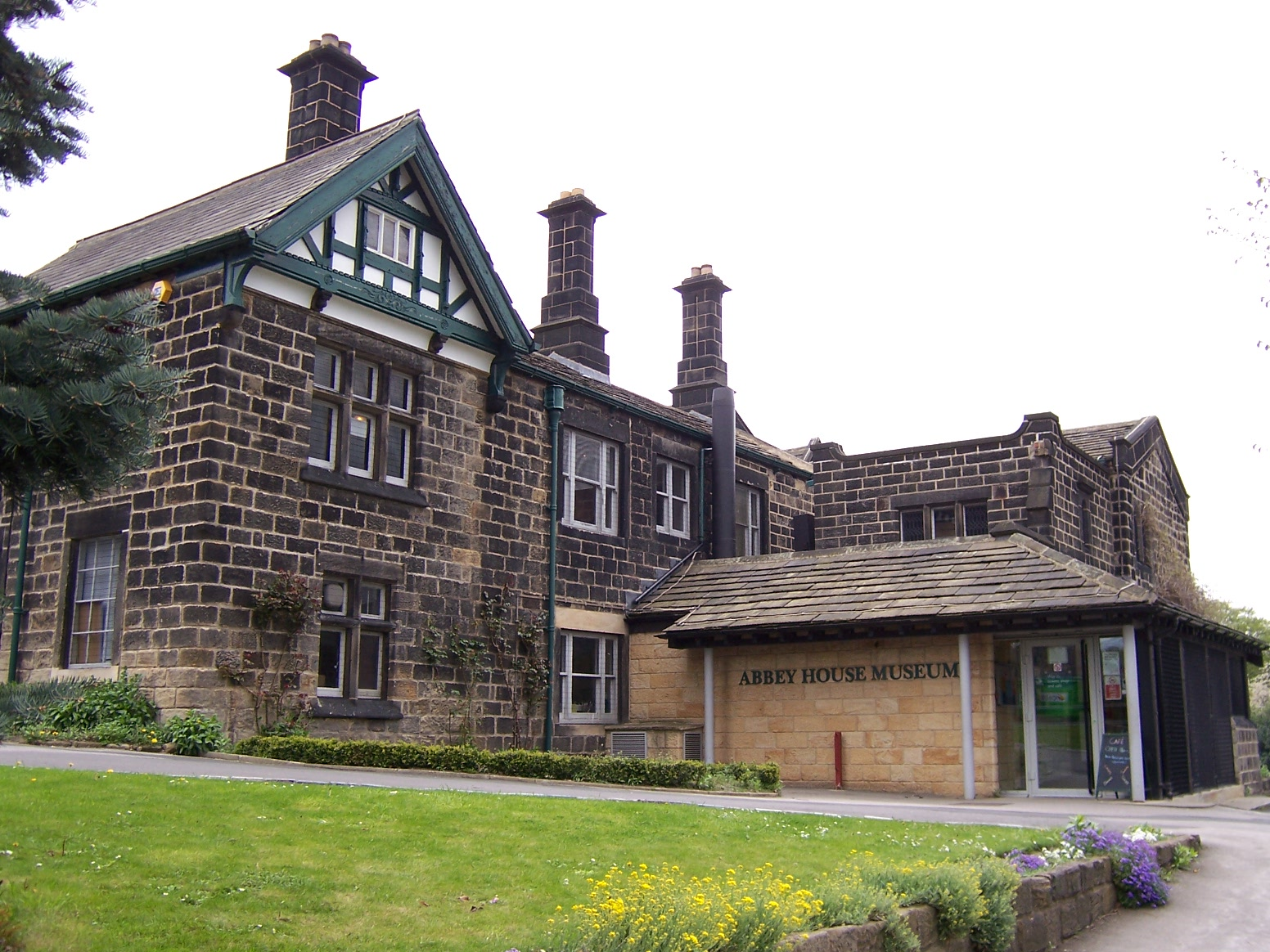
Abbey House Museum

The name of Kirkstall comes from a Northern dialect of Old English word 'Kirk' ('church') and Old English stall ('place') and means 'site of a church'. The traveller John Leland spelt the name as "Christal" in his writings of 1536.

During the English Civil War, the bridge over the Aire at Kirkstall (referred to in a contemporaneous account as 'Churchstall') was destroyed by Royalist troops from Leeds. After discovering this, a Parliamentary force led by Ferdinando Fairfax, 2nd Lord Fairfax of Cameron – from Otley – had to cross the river upstream at Apperley Bridge before retaking Leeds in January 1643.

Kirkstall was historically an important centre of industry. Kirkstall Forge lays claim to being the longest continually used industrial site in Britain founded in the 13th century by the Cistercian monks of the abbey, and a number of printers. The earliest known activity on the site was a medieval mill race which supplied water to power the corn mill at Kirkstall Abbey. Iron production took place at the forge from the 1580s onwards. During the late 18th century the reconstruction of the upper and lower forges allowed 'shovel and spade production' to commence. A railway was built at the forge in 1830 and sustained growth at the plant. The First World War brought about large scale growth, providing axles for military vehicles and by 1930 most lorries and buses made in the UK had a Kirkstall back axle casing. In 2002 the owners of the site, the Dana Holding Corporation announced the closure of the works, shifting production to India and Spain. The site is undergoing major redevelopment, as is the old Waide's Printers & Kwik Save site. Printing has, like iron-founding, suffered a decline, several printing companies remain.

Kirkstall Power Station

Until 1976 when it was closed, Kirkstall was dominated by a coal fired power station. It was replaced by larger power stations away from town at Ferrybridge, Eggborough and Drax. The power station was demolished in the early 1980s.

=== Kirkstall Abbey ===
Kirkstall Abbey is a ruined Cistercian monastery set in grounds which are now a public park on the north bank of the River Aire. It was founded in about 1152 and took over 75 years to construct. It was closed during the Dissolution of the Monasteries under the auspices of Henry VIII. The ruins have been painted by artists such as J. M. W. Turner and Thomas Girtin.

== Amenities ==
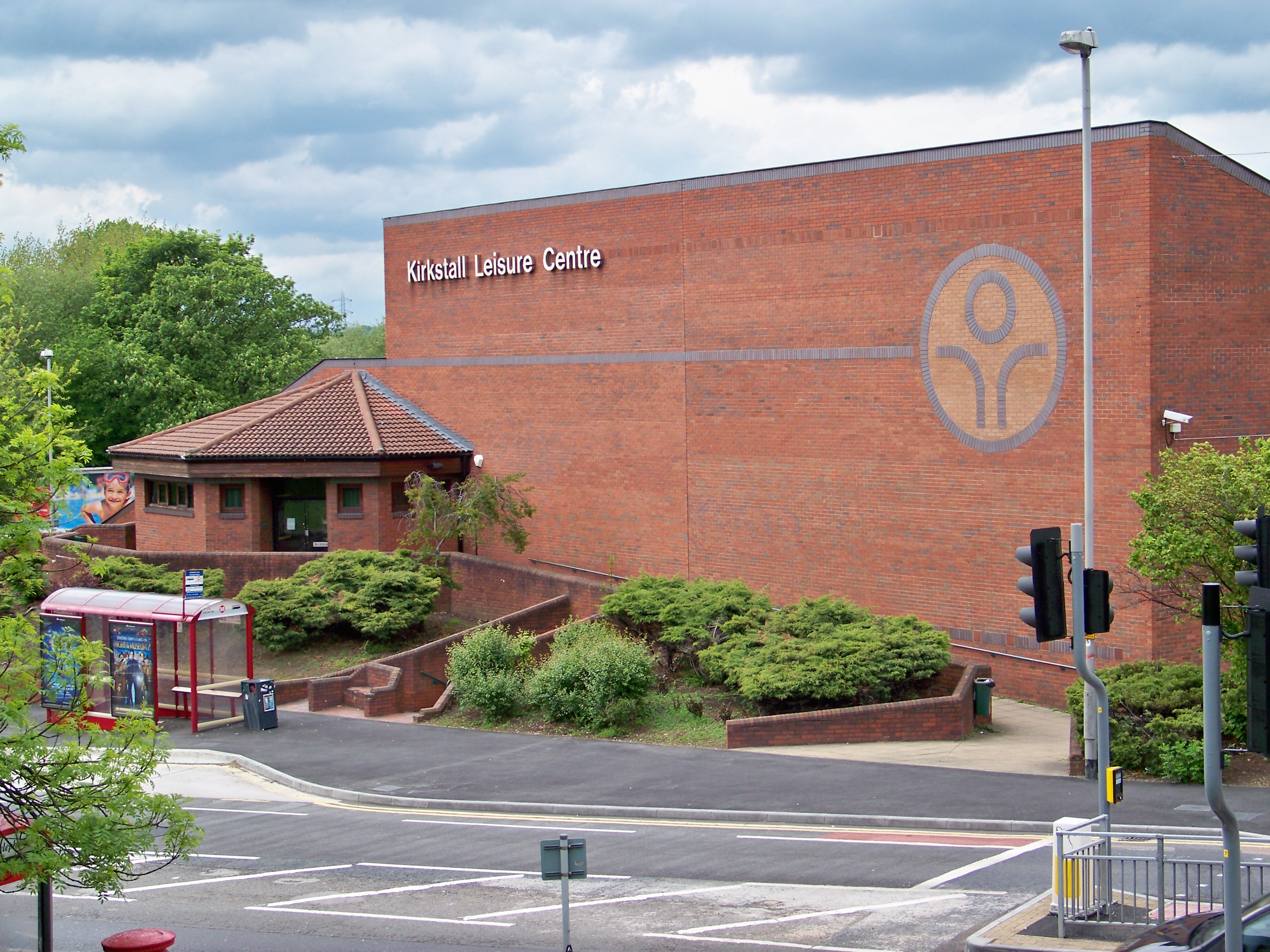
Kirkstall Leisure Centre

Kirkstall's amenities are stretched along Kirkstall Road and Abbey Road. There are several pubs, a supermarket and several other shops around it on the site of the former Waddingtons factory.The Kirkstall Bridge Shopping complex contains many stores. A small shopping precinct is situated adjacent to the A65 and Kirkstall Lane has become dilapidated in recent years, soon to be rebuilt on with houses and shops.

St Stephen's C of E (VA) Primary School has a coat of arms that reflects Kirkstall's rich history.

== Transport ==
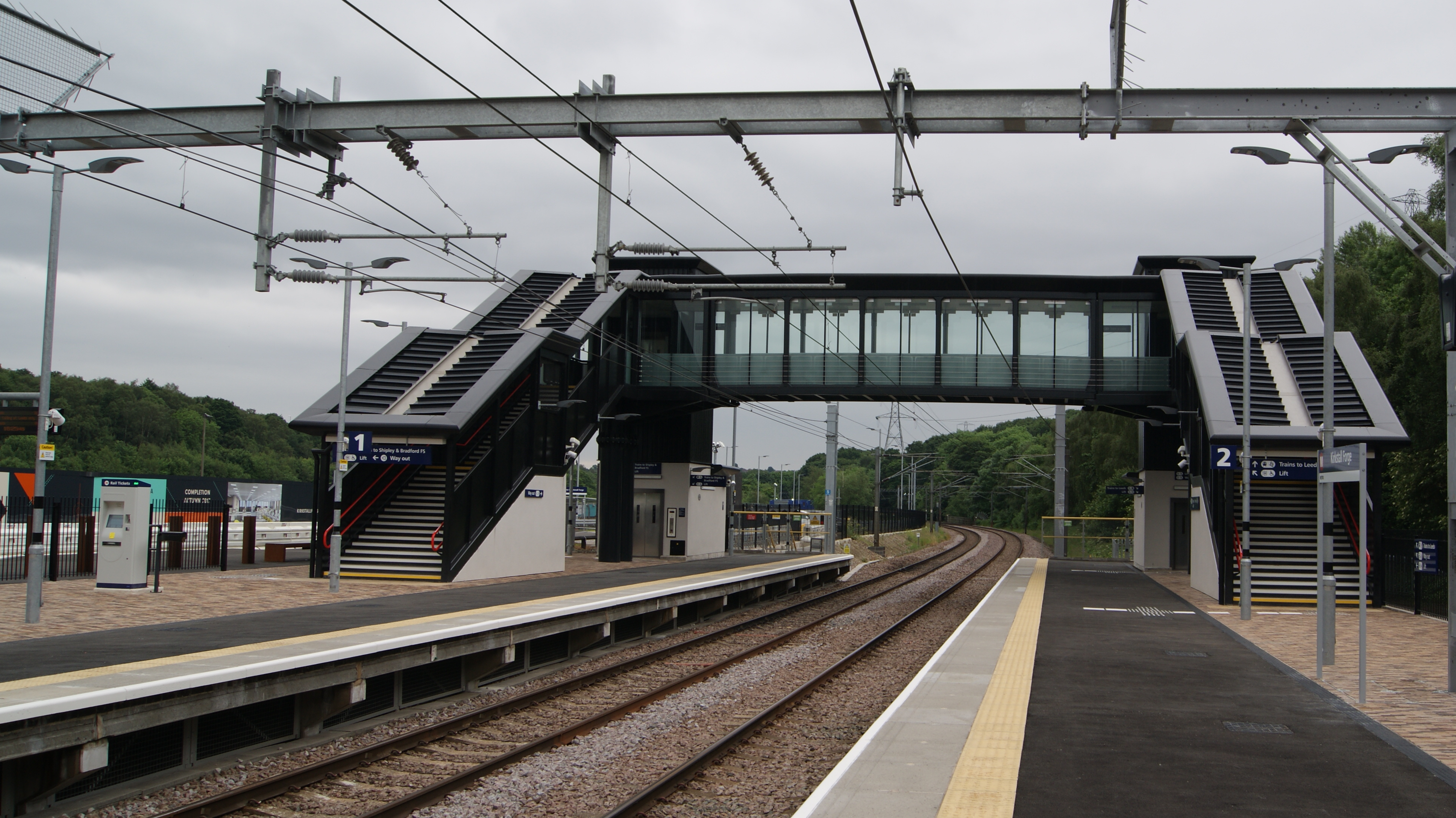
Kirkstall Forge railway station

Kirkstall is situated on the A65 road which links it to Leeds city centre, Guiseley, Yeadon and Ilkley. This is crossed in the town centre by the B6157 road between Stanningley and Moortown. The latter crosses the River Aire on the Grade II listed Kirkstall Bridge.

There are two railway lines: The Bradford line passes along the Aire Valley and has a railway station at Kirkstall Forge which opened in June 2016. The Harrogate line passes near Kirkstall and Headingley station is a few minutes walk from the centre of Kirkstall. The former Leeds tramway ran through Kirkstall until it was dismantled in 1959, a substation used by the tramway is still visible on Abbey Road. There are many bus routes through Kirkstall. The Leeds and Liverpool Canal also passes through Kirkstall close to the river and its tow path provides walking, running and cycling routes to Leeds and also west to Rodley and Shipley.

Company	Route	Destinations
First Leeds	33 & 34	Leeds city centre, Horsforth, Rawdon, Guiseley, Yeadon, Menston, Otley
First Leeds	49	Monkswood Gate, Oakwood, St James' Hospital, Leeds city centre, Bramley
First Leeds	50 50A	Seacroft, Harehills, St James' Hospital, Leeds city centre, Hawksworth, Horsforth
Keighley Bus Company	60	Leeds city centre, Rodley, West Yorkshire, Greengates, Thackley, Shipley, Saltaire, Bingley, Keighley.
First Leeds	91	Pudsey, Bramley, Headingley, Meanwood, Chapeltown, Harehills, Halton Moor.
First Calderdale & Huddersfield	508	Leeds city centre, Thornbury, Odsal, Shelf, Halifax
Yorkshire Coastliner	A1	Leeds city centre, Horsforth, Leeds Bradford Airport.

== Notable events ==
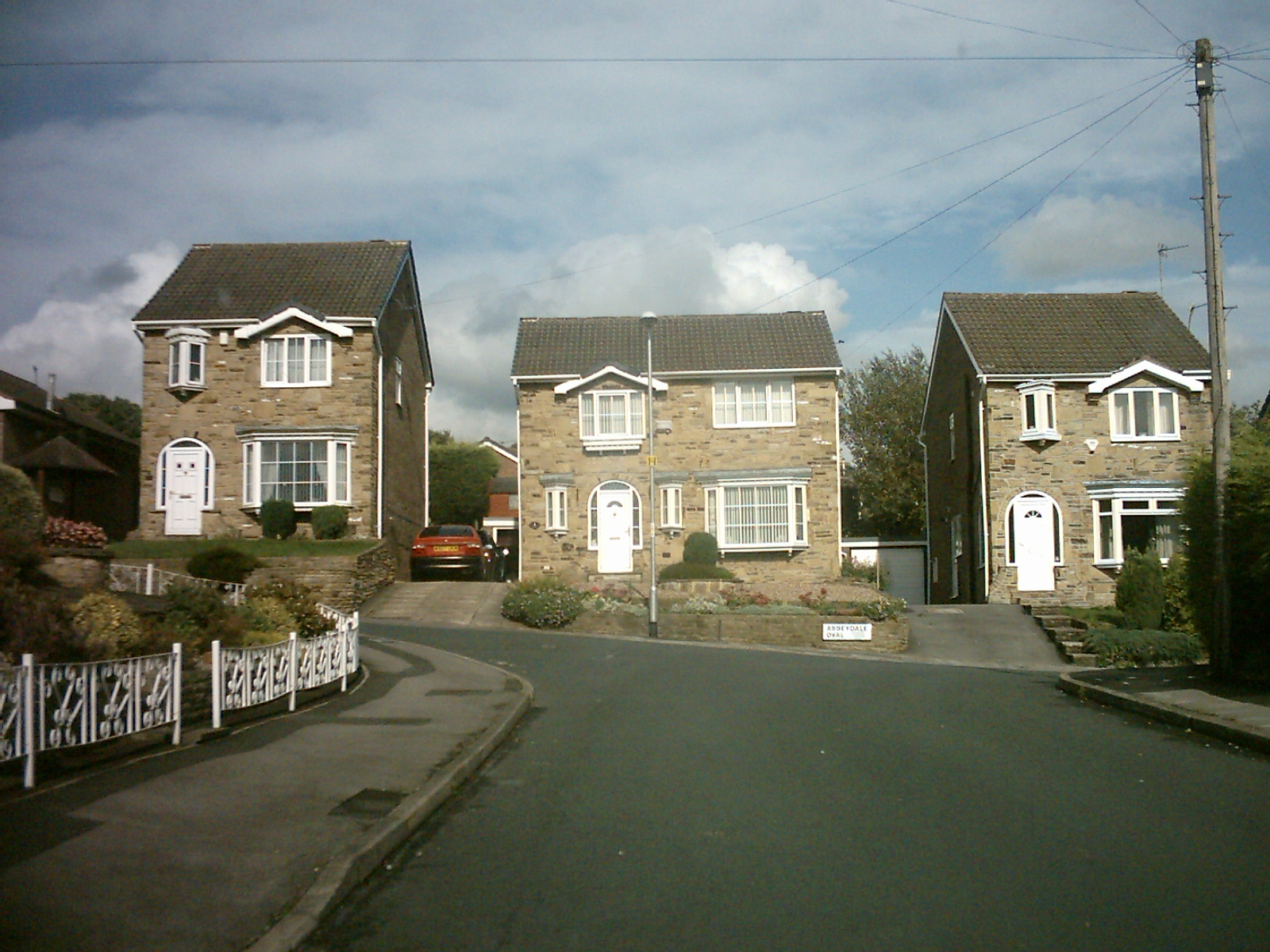
Abbeydale Oval. The house on the far left was extensively used in filming The Beiderbecke Affair.

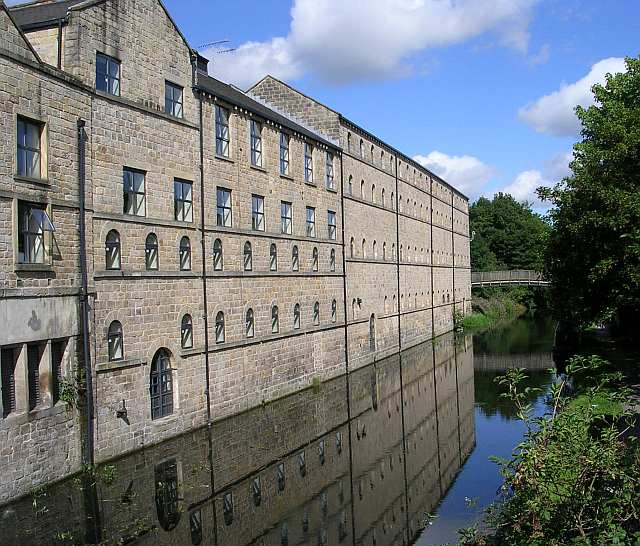
Kirkstall Brewery buildings

The Kirkstall Brewery site was converted into a large hall of residence for students of Leeds Beckett University. Other developments in Kirkstall include the Morrisons shopping complex, off the A65 road, by the river.

Filming of The Beiderbecke Affair took place partly in Kirkstall, using houses around Abbeydale Oval with other scenes shot throughout the area and Moor Grange.

The Kirkstall Festival takes place every year in the grounds of the abbey on the second Saturday in July since 1981. It is a festival of music, local arts and crafts, and is organised by volunteers of the KVCA (Kirkstall Valley Community Association).

Kirkstall Art Trail takes place every year, on the third weekend of July, since it began in 2015. The event attracted over 100 artists, workshops and activities in 2024. The variety of venues used include private houses, Kirkstall Abbey, Hollybush Conservation Centre, cafes and retail. It is organised by a small committee made up of volunteers. During the COVID-19 pandemic the Art Trail was put on hold, and they created a Living Advent Trail during the winter of 2020, which now takes place every year.

== Landmarks ==
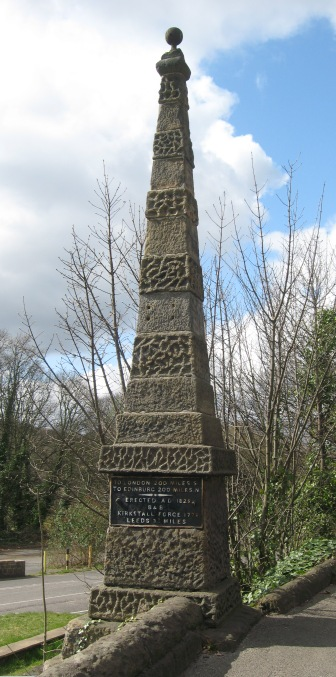
Equidistant from London and Edinburg (sic)

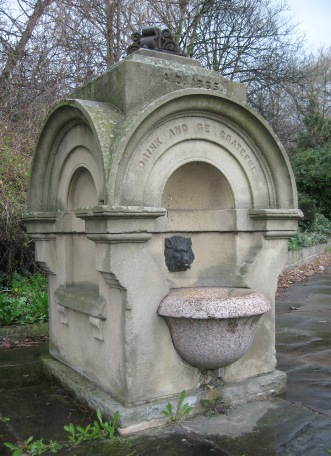
'Drink and be Grateful' fountain

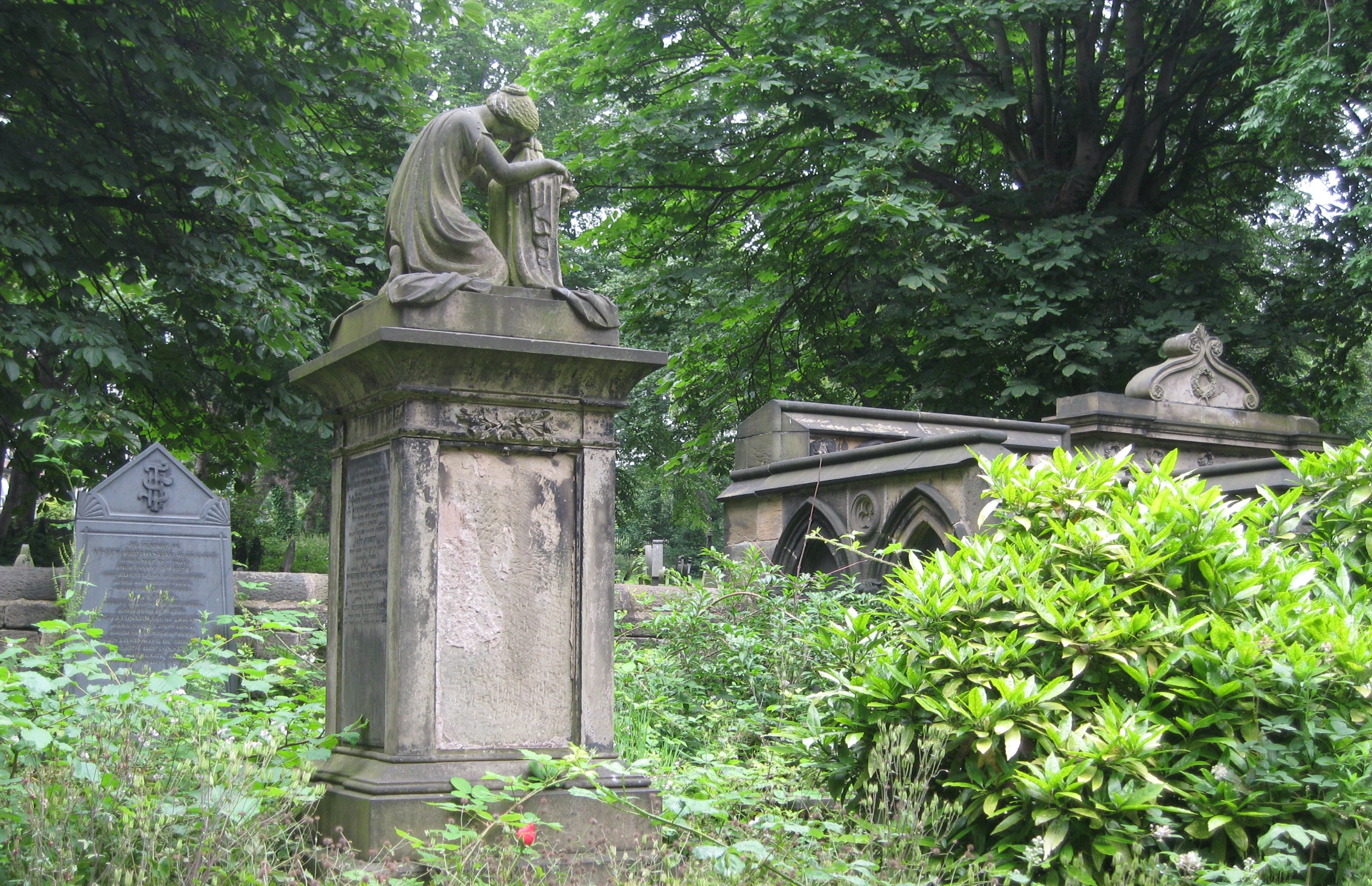
St Stephen's churchyard monuments

Kirkstall is rich in historic sites and monuments. St Stephen's churchyard has fine 19th century grave markers. Other landmarks include an elegant early 19th century stone monument on the A65 road near the Kirkstall Forge site. A plaque on the monument indicates that Kirkstall is 200 miles from London and 200 miles from Edinburgh.

The re-located 19th century drinking fountain near the demolished police station at the junction of Abbey Road and Bradford Road proclaims 'Drink and be Grateful'. The fountain's little garden had been neglected for many a year until local community gardening group Kirkstall-in-Bloom made it their initial project in 2012.

Hollybush Conservation Centre (part of The Conservation Volunteers) is located on the site of a former farm. The building dates back to at least 1700. A trade directory of the 1870s lists 'Joseph Whitwell Gentleman Rhubarb farmer of Hollybush House'. Hollybush Farm, under Whitwell, pioneered forced rhubarb, he was known as the largest commercial grower in the area. This led to the creation of the rhubarb triangle.

== 2015 Boxing Day Floods ==
In 2015 Kirkstall was subject to major flooding, affecting over 3,000 properties. The River Aire banks broke leaving vast areas of Kirkstall under deep water, reaching record levels according to the Environment Agency.

During the floods which reached national news, two local men were pictured at a pub the ‘Kirkstall Bridge Inn’ in the beer garden submerged in water drinking pints, the image has since become viral.

== Notable people ==
- Cricketer Frederick Asquith (1870–1916), a wicket-keeper for Yorkshire, was born in Kirkstall.
- Harold White (1876–1965), cricketer
- Mel B
- Jake Thackray
- Philip Stone
- Robert Blackburn (1885–1955), an English aviation pioneer and the founder of Blackburn Aircraft, was born in Kirkstall.

== See also ==
- Listed buildings in Leeds (Kirkstall Ward)
- Kirkstall Abbey
- Kirkstall Brewery
- Kirkstall Forge railway station
- Kirkstall Valley campaign
