= Kirkstall Bridge =

Road bridge in Yorkshire, England

Coordinates: 53.8158°N 1.6072°W

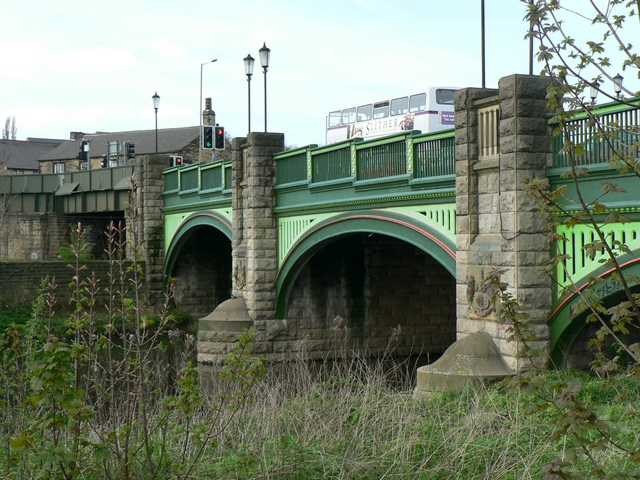
Kirkstall Bridge

Kirkstall Bridge is a Grade II listed road bridge in Kirkstall, City of Leeds, West Yorkshire, leading the B6157 road across the River Aire and the railway line between Leeds and Shipley.

The bridge was erected by J. A. Mackay, then City Engineer of Leeds, and opened by Alderman Francis Martineau Lupton. in June 1912. The event is commemorated by a cast iron plaque at the eastern end. Cast iron segmental arches on stone piers carry the road, slightly rising from east to west, across the river. The abutments are decorated with the coat of arms of Leeds looking towards the river. Their top parts are pierced, as are the parapet rails and the spandrels of the bridge arches. The lamp posts on the abutments were installed in the middle of the 20th century.

== See also ==
- Listed buildings in Leeds (Kirkstall Ward)
