= Kirkstall Valley campaign =

Campaign group in West Yorkshire, England

The Kirkstall Valley Campaign was an action group formed to fight the development of a river valley near Kirkstall, England. It spanned over ten years from around 1986 through 1996. The official campaign was founded in June 1988.

It became the subject of an important legal case that was reported in The Times law reports.
