= Frederick Asquith =

English county cricketer (1870–1916)

Frederick Thomas Asquith (5 February 1870 – 11 January 1916) was an English cricketer, who played one game of first-class cricket for Yorkshire County Cricket Club in 1903, making his debut at the age of 33 against Gloucestershire at Bramall Lane, Sheffield. A specialist wicket-keeper, he took two catches in the match but in his only innings failed to score, being bowled for a duck by Gilbert Jessop after coming in at number six in the order.

Asquith was born in Kirkstall, Leeds. Asquith played occasionally for Yorkshire Second XI around the turn of the century, and was associated with Morley Cricket Club among several others. It is believed he batted left-handed. He learnt his cricket in Leeds with the Sheepscar Leather Works Club, and later kept wicket for Hull Town C.C. He once scored 123 against York C.C. At one time he was landlord of the Locomotive public house in Hessle Road, Hull.

Asquith died in January 1916, at the age of 45, in Hull.
