= Harold White (English cricketer) =

English cricketer and clergyman

Personal information
- Full name: Harold White
- Born: 16 June 1876; Kirkstall, Yorkshire, England
- Died: 11 January 1965 (aged 88); Taunton, Somerset, England
- Batting: Right-handed
- Bowling: Right-arm fast

Domestic team information
- Years: Team
- 1900–1901: Oxford University
- 1909–1913: Northumberland

Career statistics
Competition	First-class
Matches	11
Runs scored	77
Batting average	8.55
100s/50s	–/–
Top score	26
Balls bowled	1,662
Wickets	31
Bowling average	23.38
5 wickets in innings	1
10 wickets in match	–
Best bowling	6/10
Catches/stumpings	3/–
- Source: Cricinfo, 18 June 2019

Harold White (16 June 1876 – 11 January 1965) was an English first-class cricketer and clergyman.

White was born at Kirkstall in June 1876. He later studied at Keble College at the University of Oxford. While studying at Oxford he made his debut in first-class cricket for Oxford University against A. J. Webbe's XI at Oxford in 1900. He played first-class cricket for Oxford University until 1901, making eleven appearances. Playing as a right-arm fast bowler, White took 31 wickets at an average of 23.38, with best figures of 6 for 10. These figures were his only first-class five wicket haul and came against Sussex at Hove in 1900. His teammates while playing for Oxford included Bernard Bosanquet, and, Tip Foster, a future England captain.

After graduating from Oxford he became an Anglican clergyman. While working as a clergyman at Cramlington, White played minor counties cricket for Northumberland between 1909 and 1913, making eight appearances in the Minor Counties Championship. His career as a clergyman later took him to Killingworth, Bugbrooke, and Chawton. He died at Taunton in January 1965.
