= Kirkstall Brewery =

Site of brewery in Leeds, England

Coordinates: 53.8154°N 1.6093°W

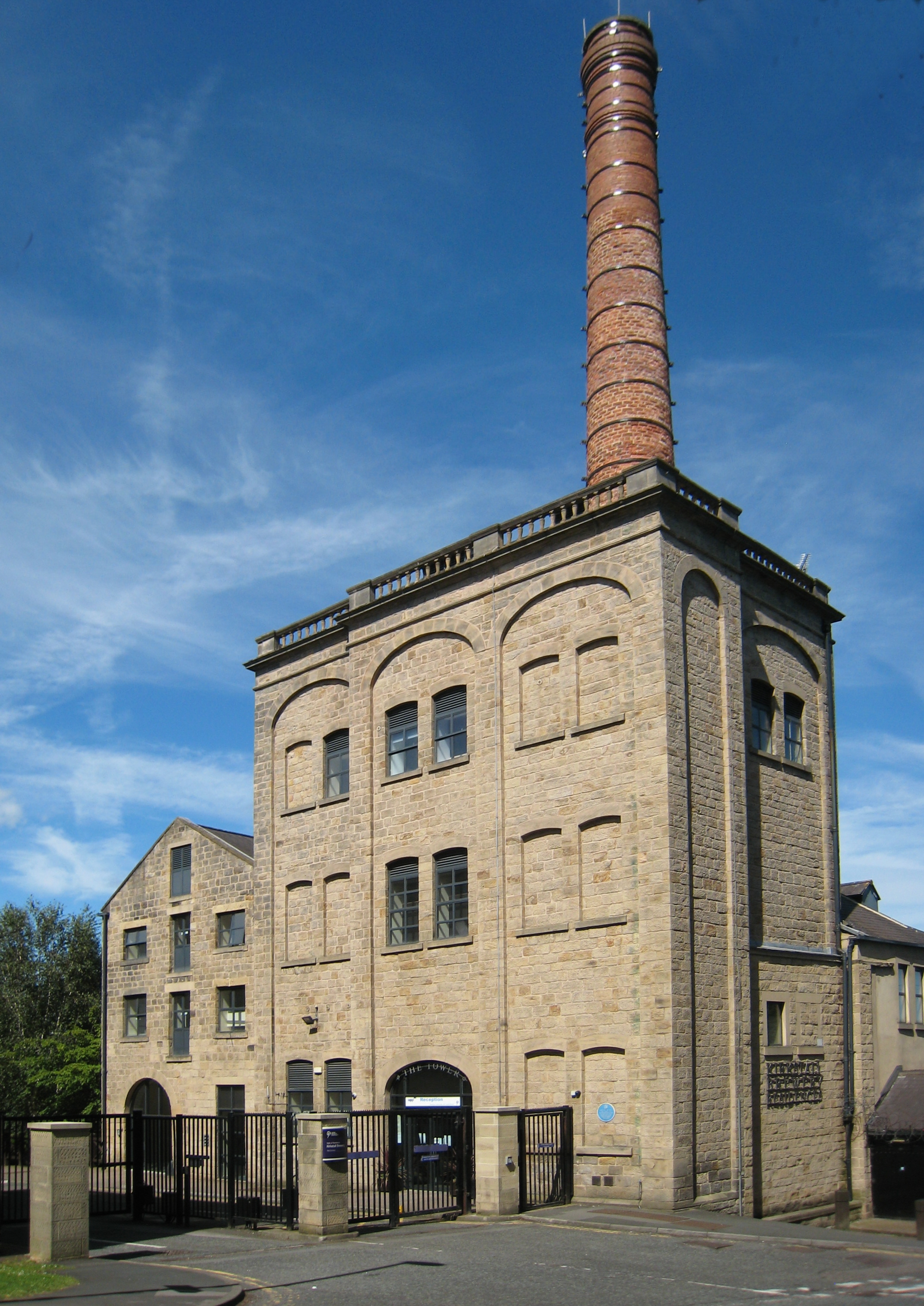
Tower brewing building and chimney by the main entrance

Kirkstall Brewery is a complex of Grade II listed buildings built in the 19th century on either side of the Leeds and Liverpool Canal.

== History ==
The complex started as maltings, and the first buildings were erected at the end of the 18th and the beginning of the 19th century. They were later converted into a brewery and added to on several occasions between 1833 and 1954 for the various owners before its eventual conversion.

From	To	Owners	Notes
1793	1814	Henry Cooper and Joseph Musgrave	Leased the area from Sir James Graham
1814	1832	Ephraim Elsworth	Operated the maltings
1833	1844	Thomas Walker	Conversion into brewery
1844	1869	Benjamin Dawson & Co	Bought from Simeon Musgrave after Walker's bankruptcy
1869	1954	Kirkstall Brewery Company	Had the tower brewery built
1936	1954	Duttons of Blackburn	Took over business of Kirkstall Brewery Company
1954	1983	Whitbreads	Bought the brewery and operated it until closure
1994	2023	Leeds Metropolitan University	Conversion into student village

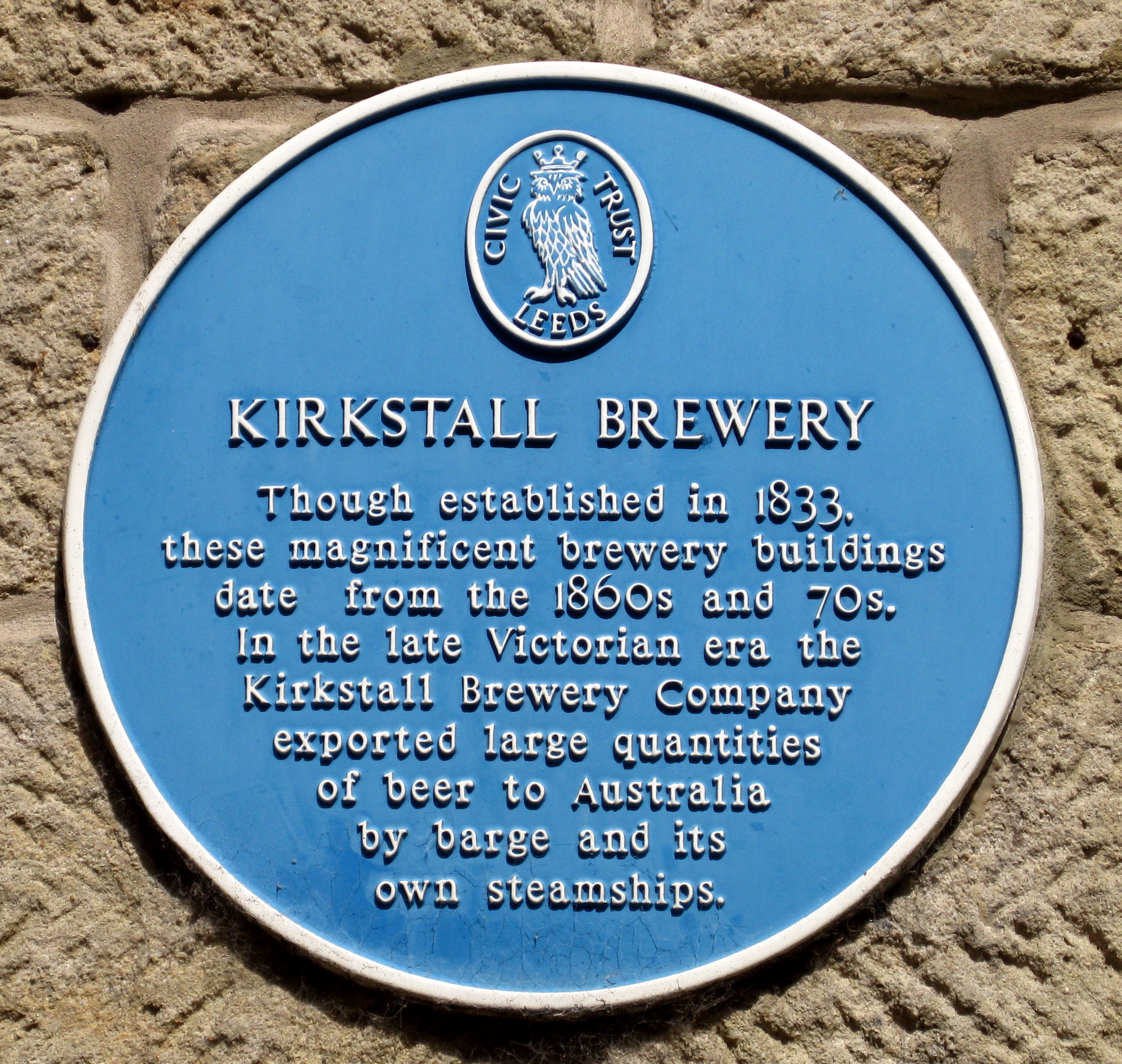
Kirkstall Brewery Blue Plaque

The Kirkstall Brewery Co. Ltd. was registered in 1871, and by 1898 was producing around 72,000 barrels of beer a year. The beer was sold in Leeds and Yorkshire. Kirkstall beers have also been recorded arriving in Australia and New Zealand.

In 1936, Dutton's Blackburn Brewery Ltd. purchased Kirkstall Brewery Co Ltd. and its subsidiaries, Albion Brewery (Leeds) Ltd. and Willow Brewery Co. Ltd. In 1938, the company was renamed Dutton's Lancashire & Yorkshire Brewery Corporation Ltd.

Duttons sold the brewery but not the associated pubs to Whibread in 1957. Kirkstall Brewery was re-equipped, and the production of bitter and mild went up to quarter of a million barrels a year. The brewery was closed in 1983. On a warehouse building on the west side of the canal, it is still possible to see the doors just above the water level that were used to load barrels of beer onto barges.

Kirkstall Brewery stood empty and unused until in the late 1990s, when it became a student accommodation under the name of "Kirkstall Brewery Residences", part of Leeds Metropolitan University. The conversion was carried out by Bowman Riley Architects.

== Facilities ==
The development provides accommodation for over 800 students. This number was initially over 1,000, but more than 140 places were lost in 2011 due to water-related subsidence to two residential buildings, which had to be demolished in 2012.

== New brewery ==
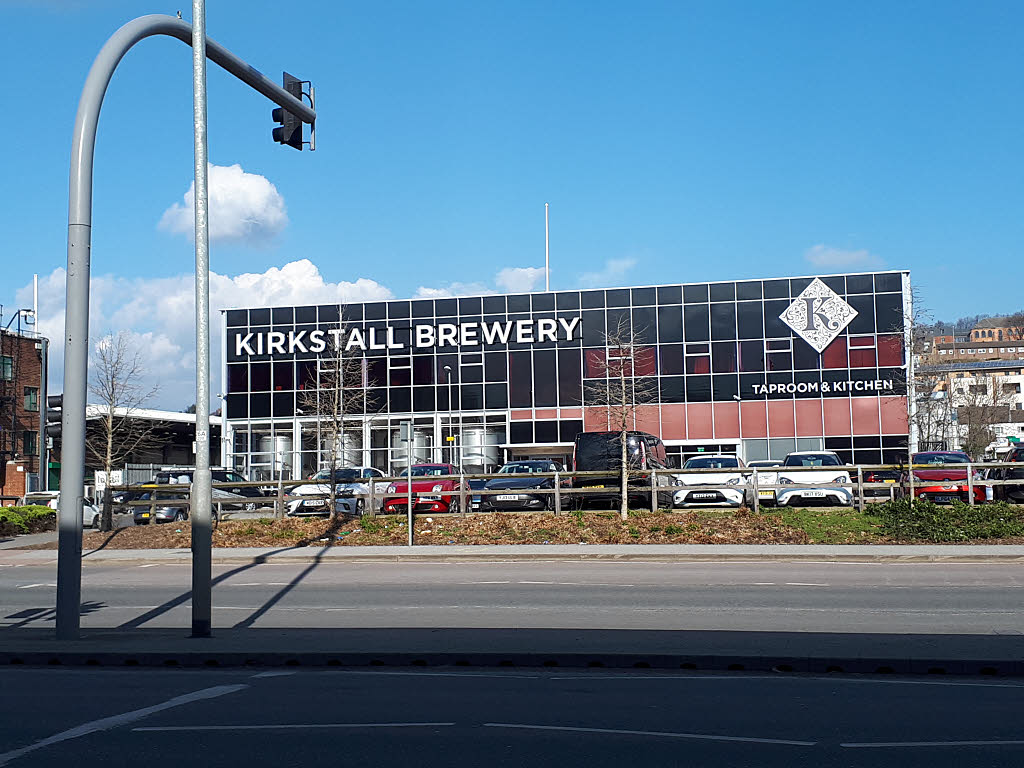
The new brewery in Burley, Leeds

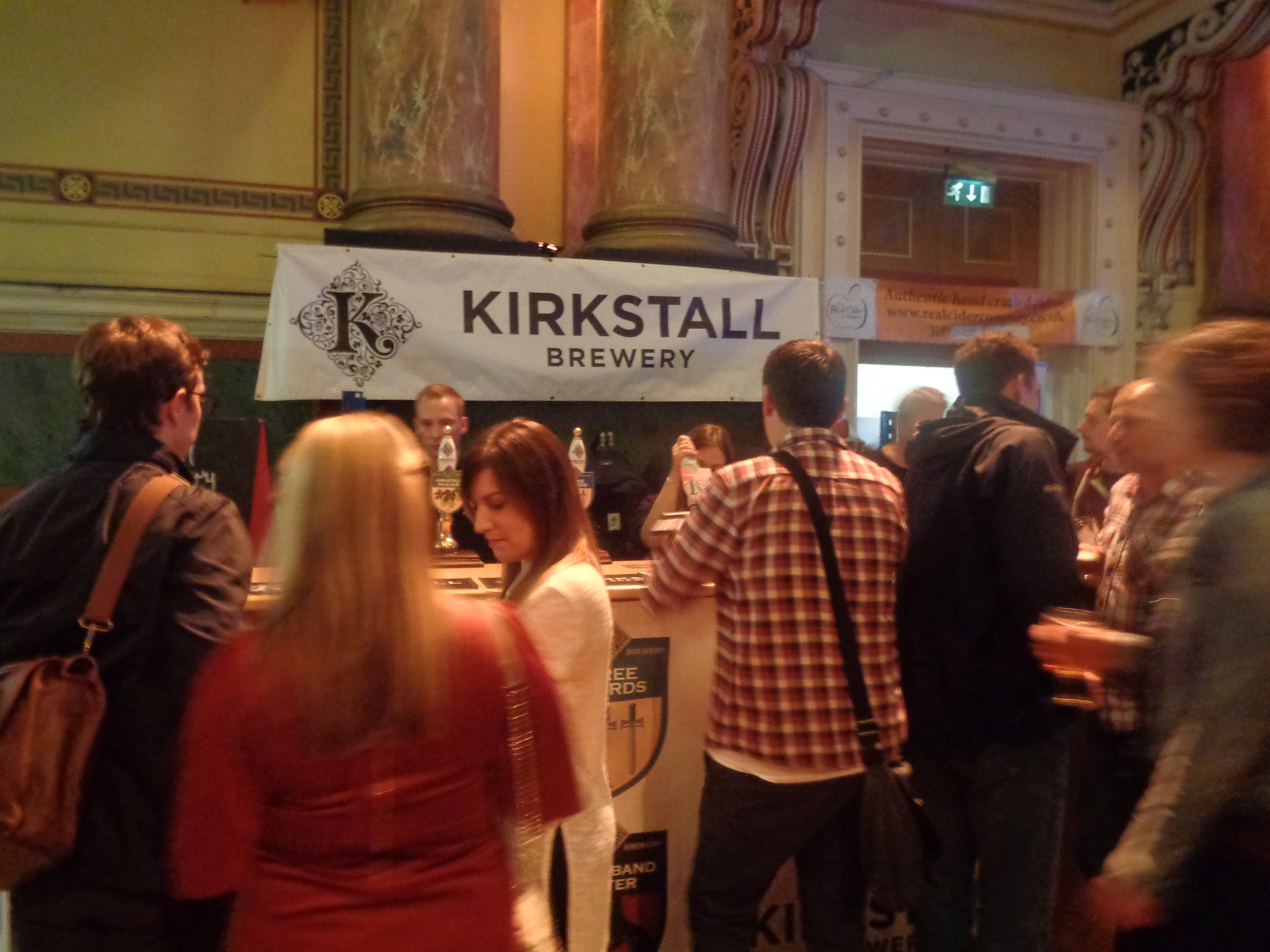
Stall at the Leeds International Beer Festival

A new brewery with the same name has been set up close to the original site. It has references to the old brewery crest and product names, and taking inspiration for their flagship 5% beer, Dissolution Extra IPA, from an original export beer from the 1860s.

== Renovation ==
As part of the renovation project the springs and watercourses that provided the water used in the brewing process were diverted, without damaging the ecosystem of a Site of Special Scientific Interest along the Leeds and Liverpool Canal. Remaining underground water flows, together with faulty draining, contributed to the damage to two residential blocks and the need for their demolition in 2012.

During renovation it was discovered that a Second World War submarine engine was installed at the brewery as a power back-up facility. This engine was one of a pair built in 1943, but never actually installed in a submarine. It was sold in 1948 to the brewery for power generation. The engine was removed in 1994 and is now at the Anson Engine Museum in Poynton, Cheshire, where it underwent restoration.

== See also ==
- Listed buildings in Leeds (Kirkstall Ward)
