= Kirkstall Abbey =

Cistercian monastery in West Yorkshire, England

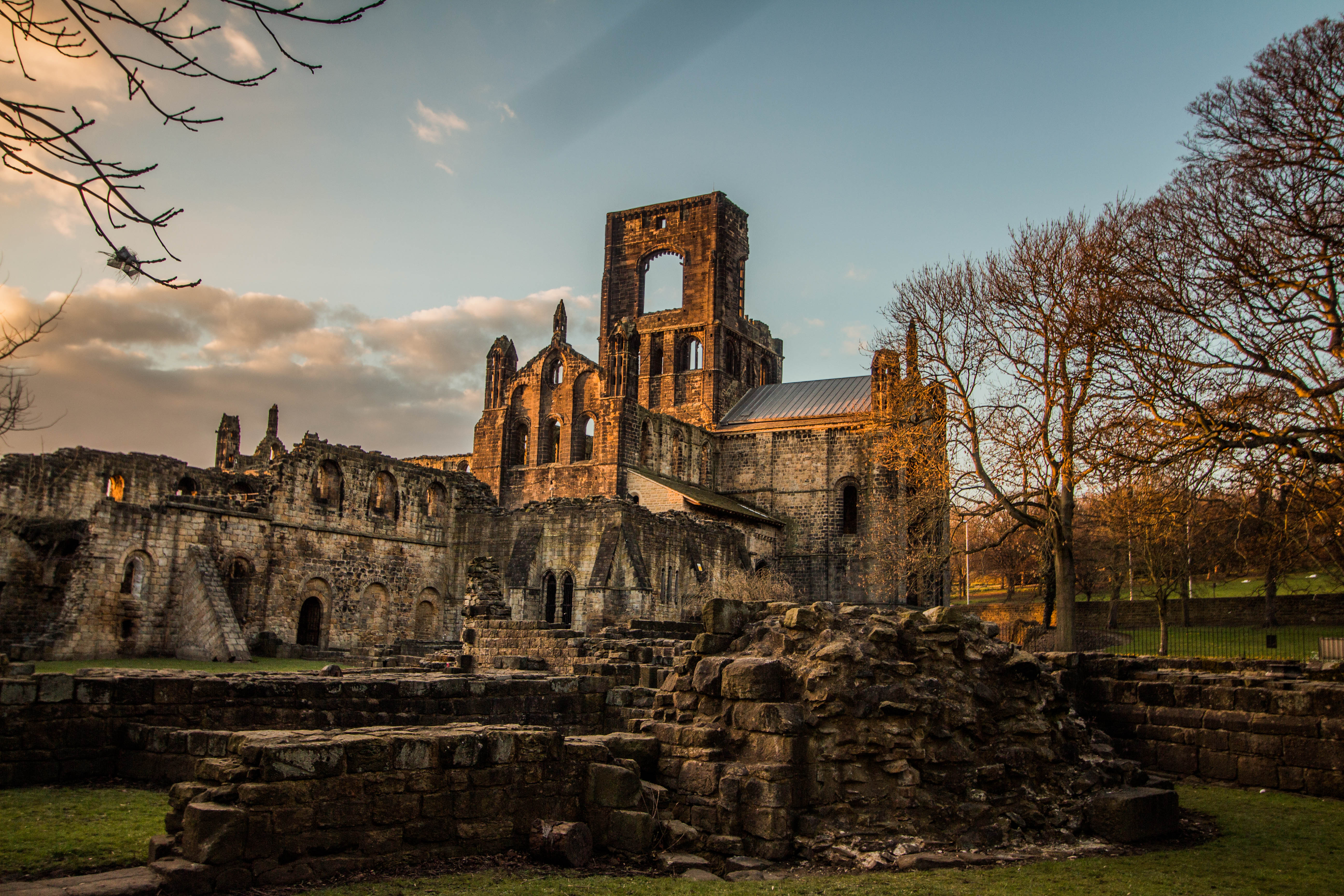

- Location within West Yorkshire
- Interactive map of Kirkstall Abbey

Monastery information
- Order: Cistercian
- Established: 1152
- Disestablished: 22 November 1539
- Mother house: Fountains Abbey
- Diocese: Diocese of York

People
- Founder: Abbot Alexander

Architecture
- Heritage designation: Grade I

Site
- Location: Kirkstall, Leeds, West Yorkshire, England
- Coordinates: 53.8210°N 1.6066°W
- Grid reference: SE258361
- Visible remains: Substantial
- Public access: Yes

Kirkstall Abbey is a ruined Cistercian monastery in Kirkstall, north-west of Leeds city centre in West Yorkshire, England. It is set in a public park on the north bank of the River Aire. It was founded c. 1152 and disestablished during the Dissolution of the Monasteries under Henry VIII.

The picturesque ruins have been drawn and painted by artists such as J. M. W. Turner, Thomas Girtin and John Sell Cotman.

Kirkstall Abbey was acquired by the Leeds Corporation as a gift from Colonel North and opened to the public in the late 19th century. The gatehouse became a museum, which is now part of the Leeds Museums & Galleries group.

== Foundation ==
Henry de Lacy (died 1177), Baron of Pontefract and of Clitheroe, promised to dedicate an abbey to the Virgin Mary should he survive a serious illness. He recovered and agreed to give the Abbot of Fountains Abbey land at Barnoldswick in the West Riding of Yorkshire (now in Lancashire) on which to found a daughter abbey. Abbot Alexander with twelve Cistercian monks from Fountains went to Barnoldswick in May 1147 and after demolishing the existing church attempted to build the abbey on Henry de Lacy's land. They stayed for six years but found the place inhospitable. Abbot Alexander set about finding a more suitable place for the abbey and came across a site in the heavily wooded Aire Valley occupied by hermits.

Alexander sought help from de Lacy, who was sympathetic and helped acquire the land from William de Poitou. The monks moved from Barnoldswick to Kirkstall, displacing the hermits, some of whom joined the abbey, the rest being paid to move. The buildings were mostly completed between 1152, when the monks arrived in Kirkstall, and the end of Alexander's abbacy in 1182. Millstone Grit for building came from Bramley Fall on the opposite side of the river.

== Buildings ==
The English Cistercian houses, of which there are remains at Fountains, Rievaulx, Kirkstall, Tintern and Netley, were mainly arranged after the same plan, with slight local variations. Below is the groundplan of Kirkstall Abbey, which is one of the best preserved.

The church is of the Cistercian type, with a short chancel (3), and transepts (4) with three eastward chapels to each, divided by solid walls. The building is plain, the windows are unornamented, and the nave (1) has no triforium. The windows and doorways have round heads, whereas the vaulting arches are pointed and the moldings and capitals also show early Gothic features. During the 15th century, the great east window was replaced with a smaller one. The tower over the crossing was made higher in the 16th century, just before dissolution.

The cloister to the south (5) occupies the whole length of the nave. On the east side stands the two-aisled chapter house (7), between which and the south transept is a small sacristy, and on the other side two small apartments, one of which was probably the parlour (8). Beyond this is the calefactory or day-room of the monks. Above this whole range of building runs the monks' dormitory, opening by stairs into the south transept of the church.

On the south side of the cloister (5) there are the remains of the old refectory, running, as in Benedictine houses, from east to west, and the new refectory (12), which, with the increasing occupancy of the house, superseded it, reoriented, as is usual in Cistercian houses, from north to south. Adjacent to this apartment are the remains of the kitchen, pantry and buttery. The arches of the lavatory are to be seen near the refectory entrance. The western side of the cloister is occupied by vaulted cellars, supporting on the upper story the dormitory of the lay brothers (9).

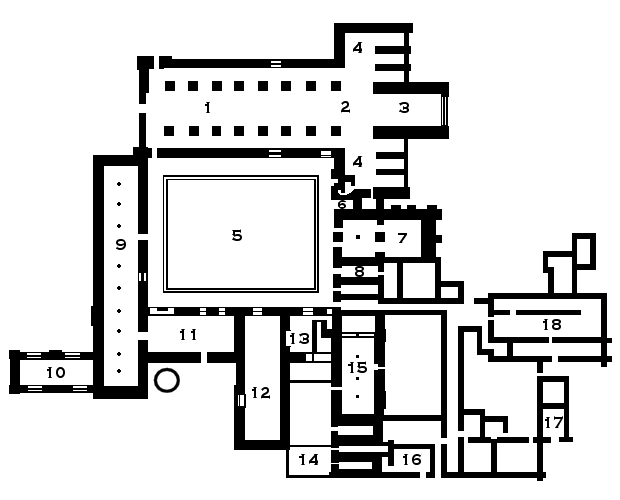
Kirkstall Abbey layout

1. Nave
2. Tower
3. Presbytery
4. North and south transepts
5. Cloister
6. Library (part of east range, with 7 & 8)
7. Chapter house (part of east range, with 6 & 8)
8. Parlour (part of east range, with 6 & 7)
9. Lay brothers' dormitory
10. Reredorter
11. The Lane/ malt house
12. Refectory
13. Warming house
14. (unknown)
15. Novices' quarter
16. Abbot's lodgings
17. Visiting abbot's lodgings
18. Infirmary

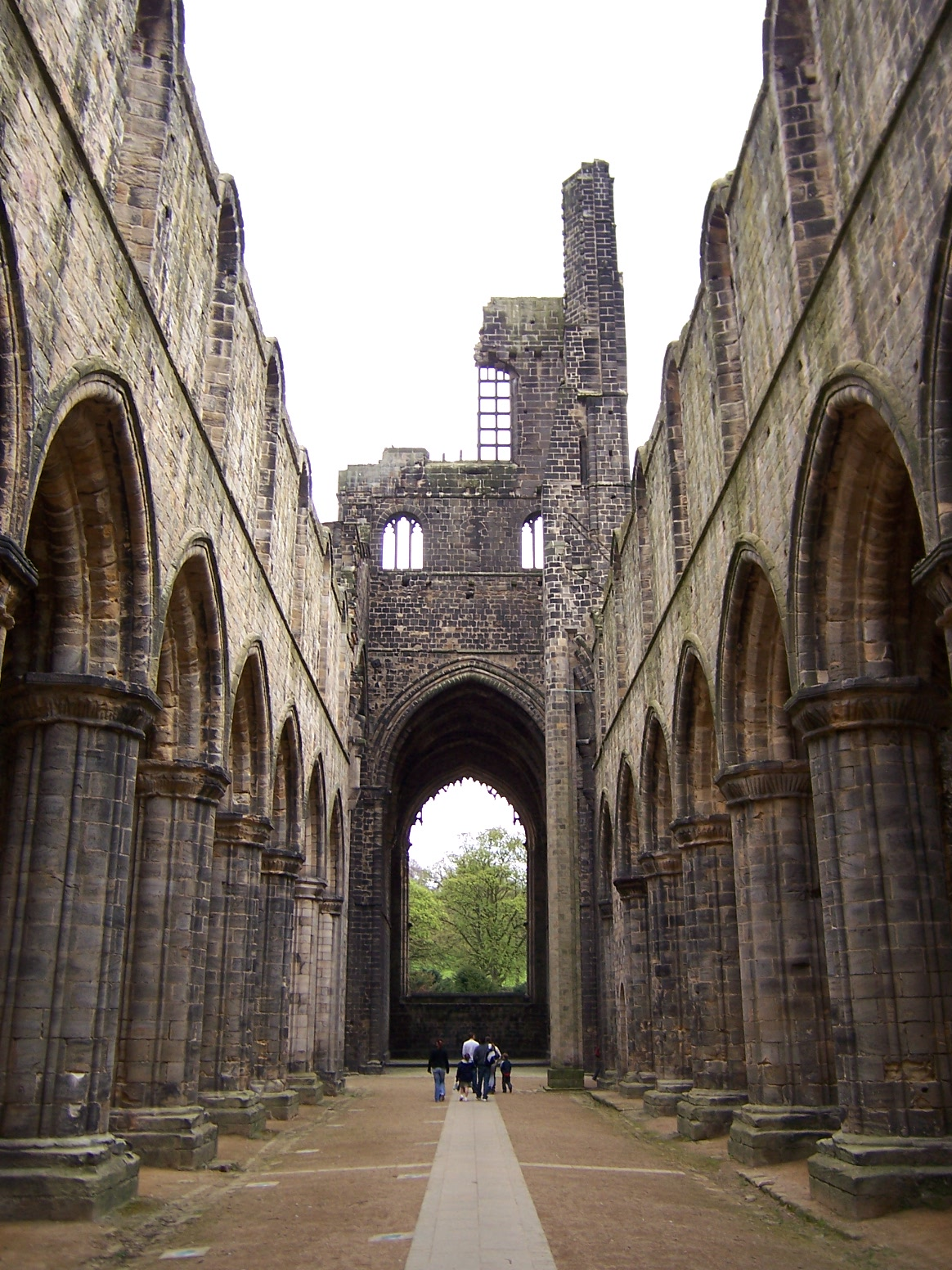
Inner view from the nave

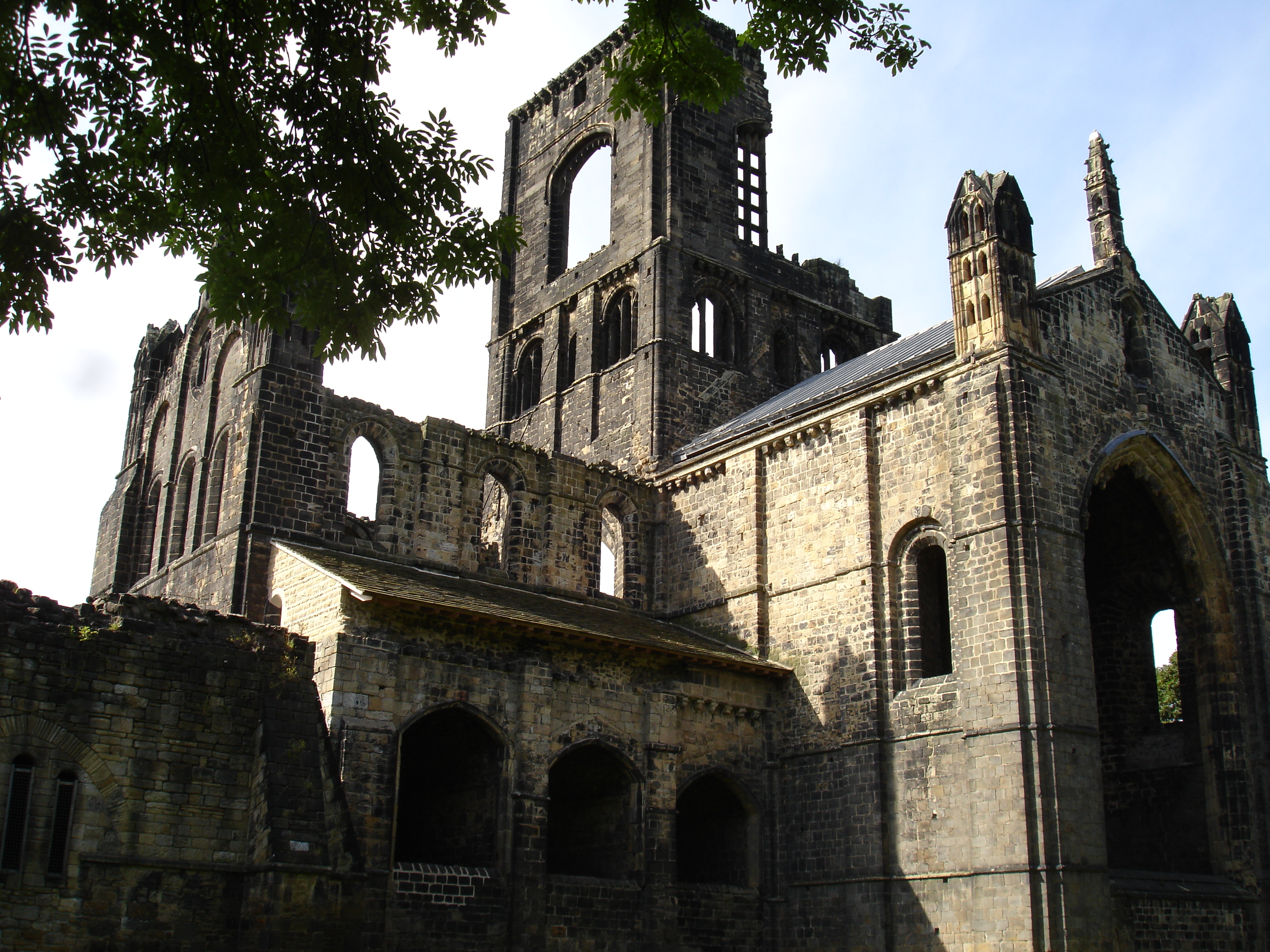
Outer view of the nave, tower and chapter house

Extending from the south-east angle of the main group of buildings are the walls and foundations of a secondary group of buildings (17, 18). These have been identified as the hospitium or the abbot's house, but they occupy the position in which the infirmary is more usually found. The hall was a very spacious apartment, measuring 83 feet (25 m) in length by 48 feet 9 inches (14.86 m) in breadth, which was divided by two rows of columns. The fish-ponds lay between the monastery and the river to the south. The abbey mill was situated about 80 yards to the north-west. The millpool may be distinctly traced, together with the goit or mill stream.

== Dissolution and later history ==
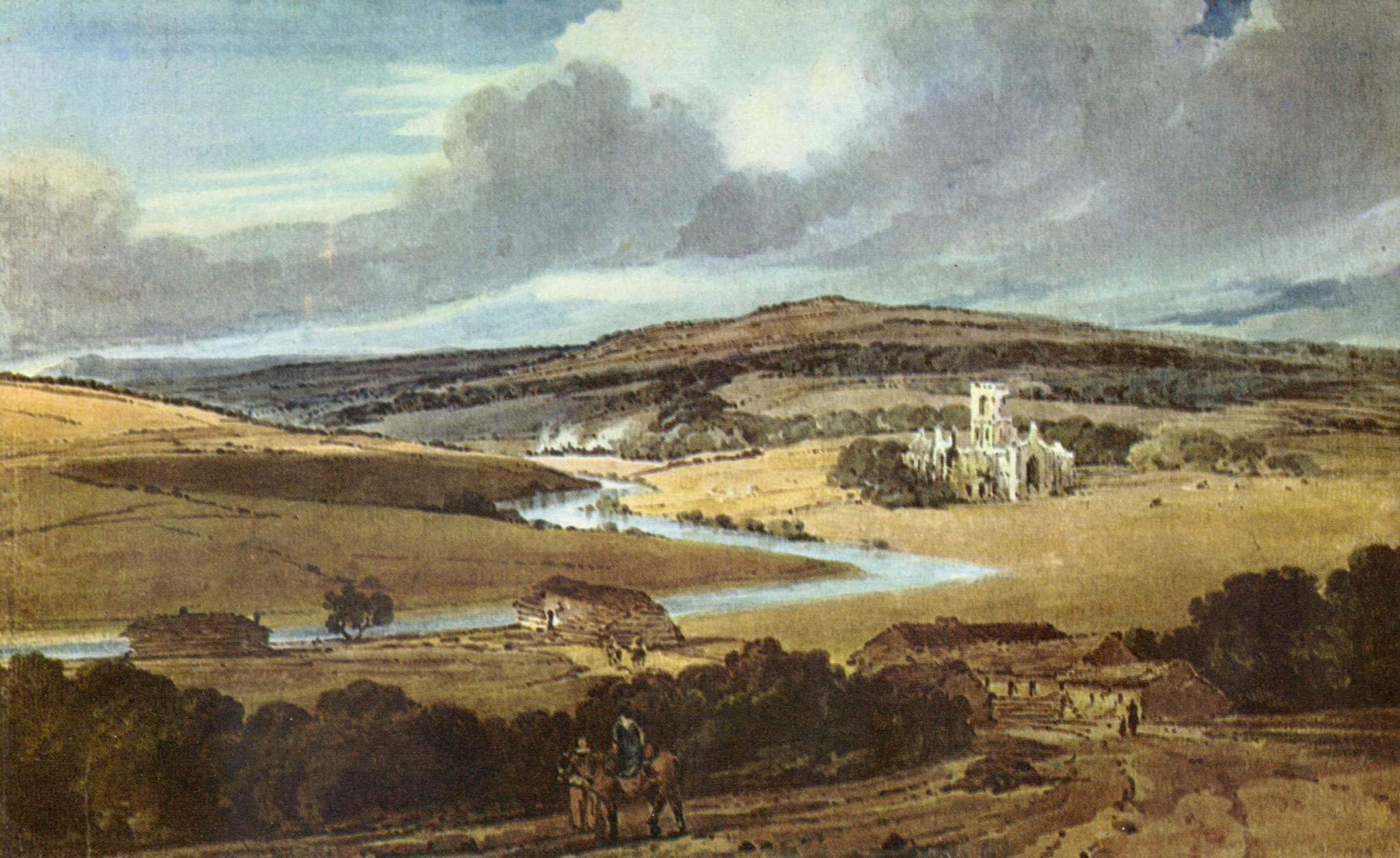
Kirkstall Abbey, by Thomas Girtin

On 22 November 1539 the abbey was surrendered to Henry VIII's commissioners in the Dissolution of the monasteries. It was awarded to Thomas Cranmer in 1542, but reverted to the crown when Cranmer was executed in 1556. Sir Robert Savile purchased the estate in 1584, and it remained in his family's hands for almost a hundred years. In 1671 it passed into the hands of the Brudenell family, the Earls of Cardigan. Much of the stone was removed for re-use in other buildings in the area, including the steps leading to the river bank by Leeds Bridge, in the town centre.

During the 18th century the picturesque ruins attracted artists of the Romantic movement and were painted by artists including J. M. W. Turner, John Sell Cotman and Thomas Girtin. In 1889 the abbey was sold to Colonel John North, who presented it to Leeds City Council. The Council undertook a major restoration project and the abbey was opened to the public in 1895.

The African American novelist William Wells Brown visited Kirkstall Abbey in 1851, writing about his experience. Using poetry and poetic language, he described the 'pensive beauty' of the desolate ruins in their 'pastoral luxuriance' showing his appreciation of British literature as well as an interest in nature and local history.

Little excavation took place before 1890, after which William St John Hope led an investigation of the abbey walls and some trees were removed. Extensive excavations were carried out during the 1950s by Leeds City Museums staff (now Leeds Museums & Galleries) under the direction of W. V. Wade of Leeds University.

== The abbey today ==
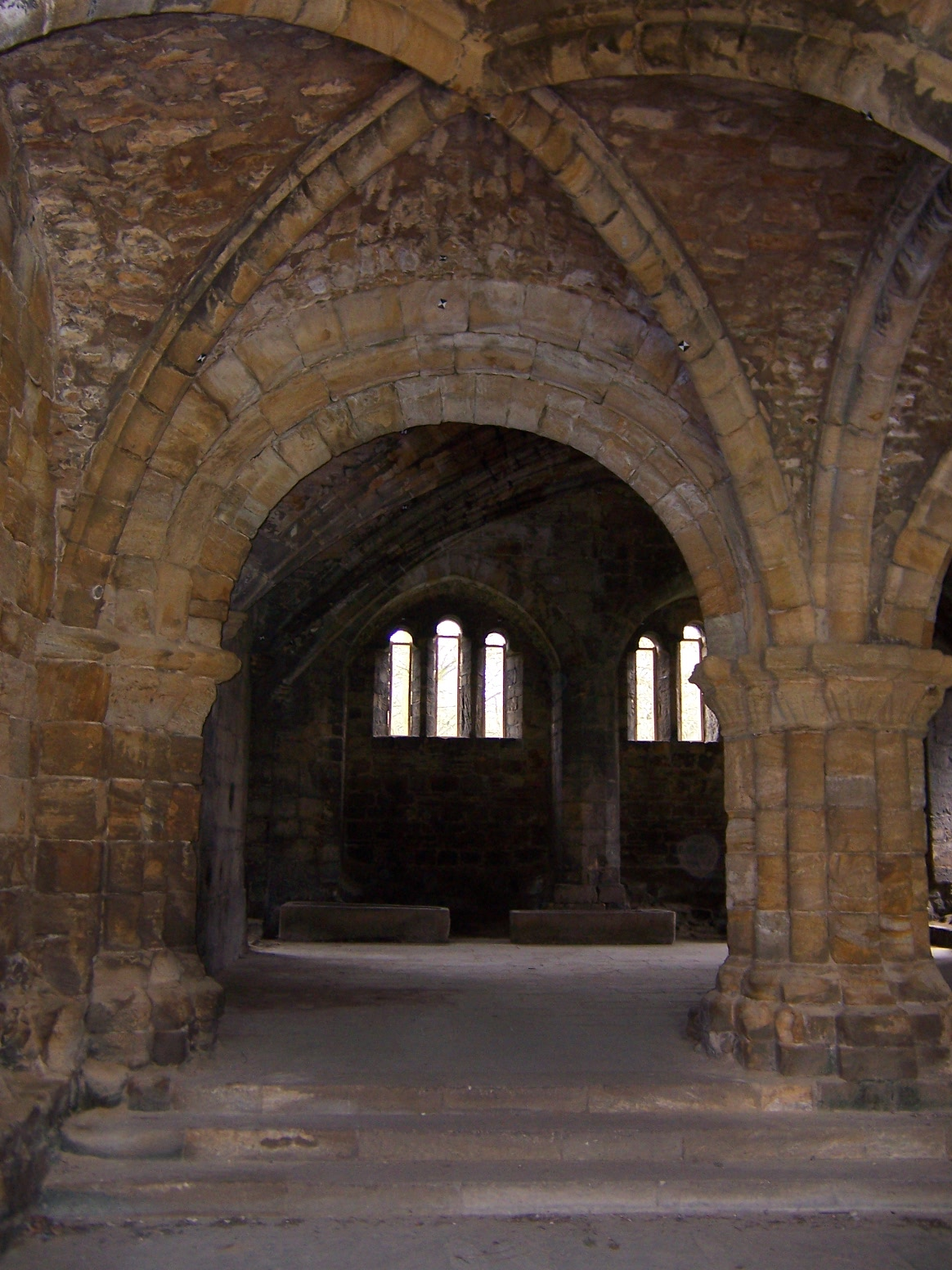
Chapter House of the abbey

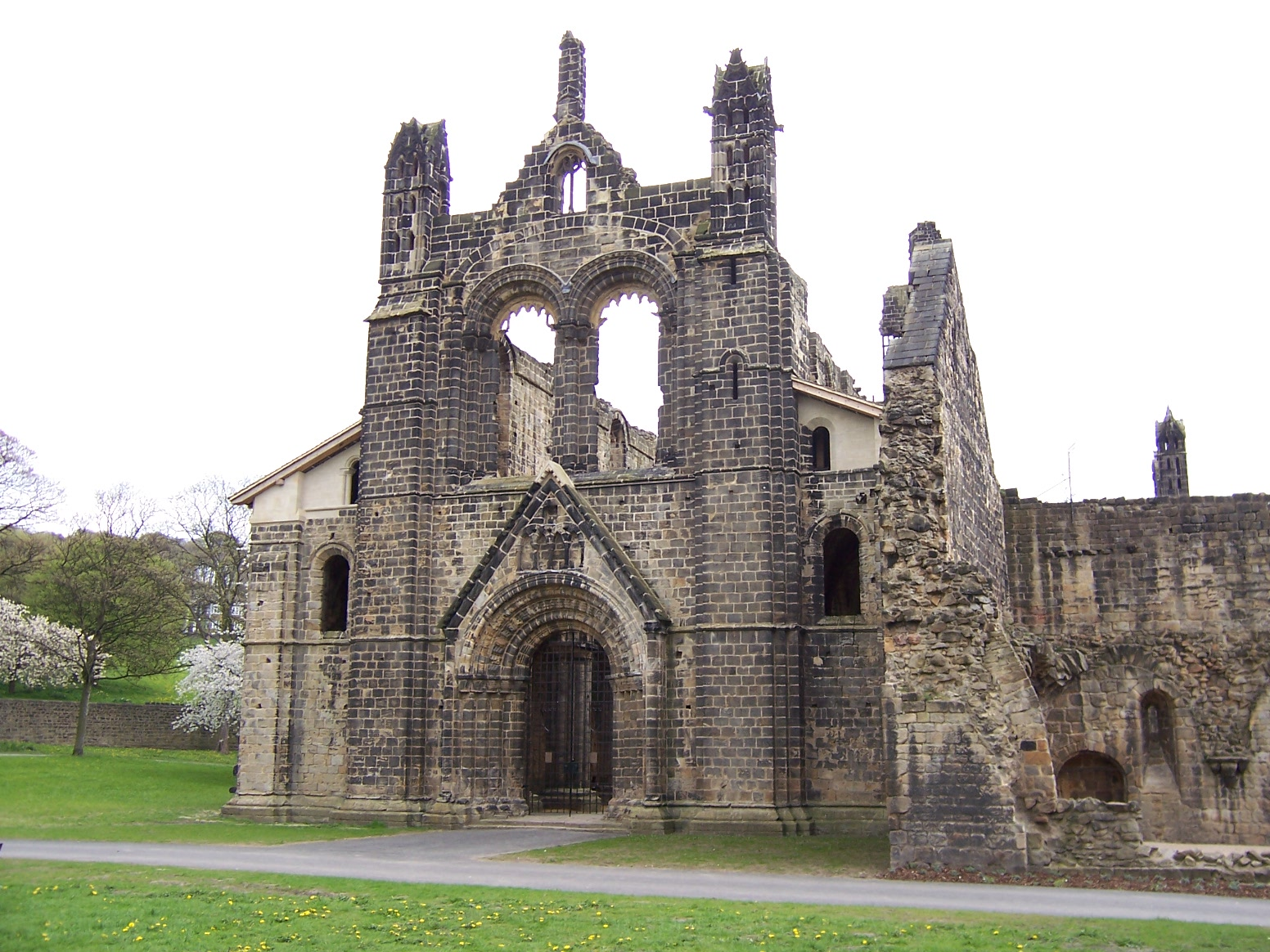
Western Elevation of the abbey

The abbey is a Grade I listed building and scheduled ancient monument. After a £5.5 million renovation programme there is a new visitor centre with interactive exhibits which illustrates the history of the abbey and the lives of the monks. Entry to the Abbey itself is via the visitor centre.

The 23.5 hectares (58 acres) grounds surrounding the abbey form a public park which includes landscaped grounds, open grassland, tennis courts, children's play area, rugby union and football pitches.

On the other side of the main road, the Grade II* listed former abbey gatehouse now forms the Abbey House Museum.

=== Cultural events ===
The Leeds Shakespeare Festival, performed by the British Shakespeare Company, took place annually in the cloisters from 1995 until 2009. The abbey grounds are a public park, and are used for occasional events such as the annual Kirkstall Festival and the Kirkstall Fantasia open-air concerts.

The Abbey was used on 19 March 2011 for the live BBC Three event Frankenstein's Wedding... Live in Leeds, a live music drama starring Andrew Gower and Lacey Turner as fiancees Victor Frankenstein and Elizabeth Lavenza.

On 10 and 11 September 2011 the Kaiser Chiefs played two concerts at Kirkstall Abbey to a maximum audience of 10,000 on each day.

The BBC Television series Gunpowder (2017) used Kirkstall Abbey as a filming location.

The Leeds Abbey Dash, an annual 10k race that takes place in October or November in the city, takes its name from the Abbey; the course heads from the city centre―along the Kirkstall Road―to the Abbey and back again.

== See also ==
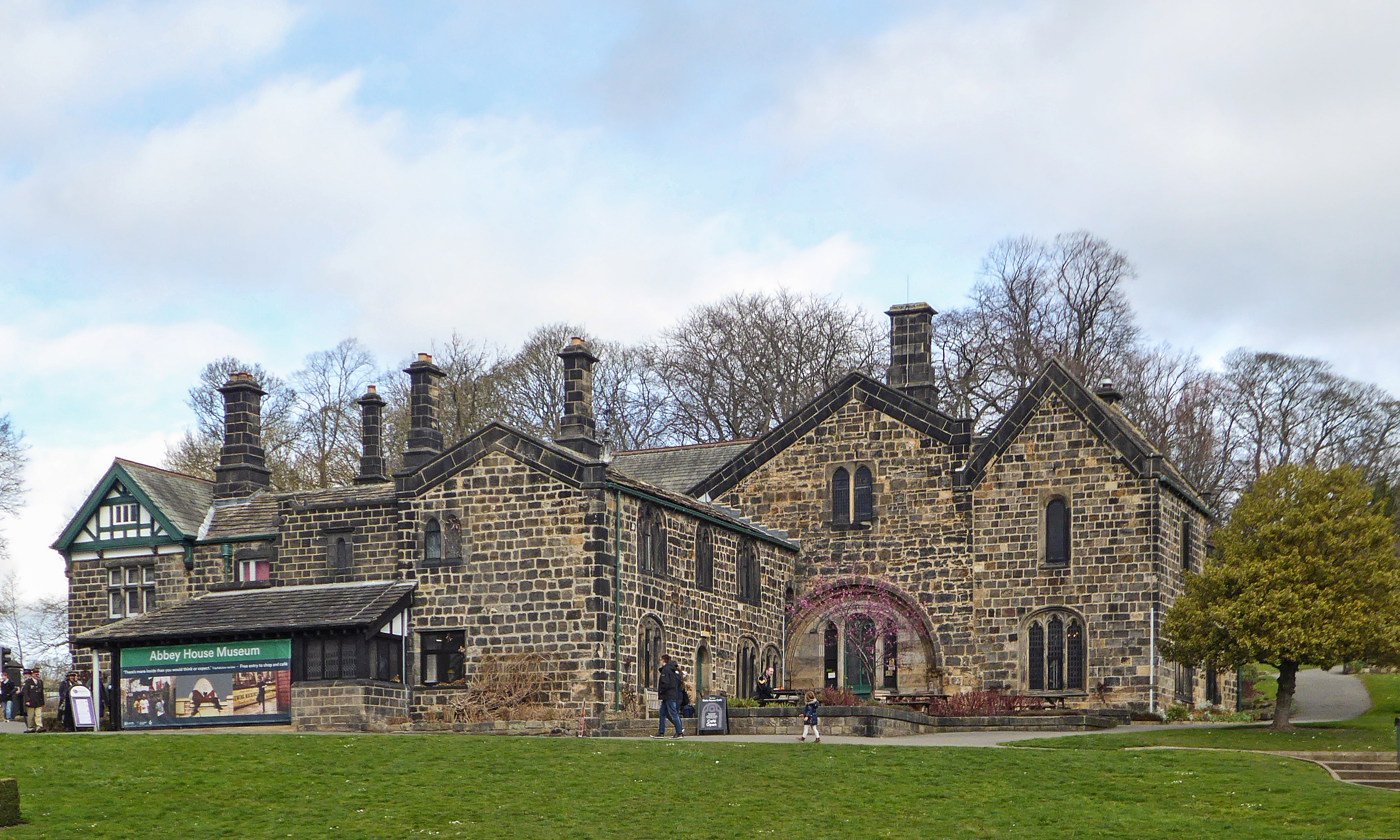
Abbey House Museum in the gatehouse

- Grade I listed buildings in West Yorkshire
- Listed buildings in Leeds (Kirkstall Ward)
- Abbey House Museum
- Architecture of Leeds
