= Coulis =

Thin sauce made from vegetables or fruits

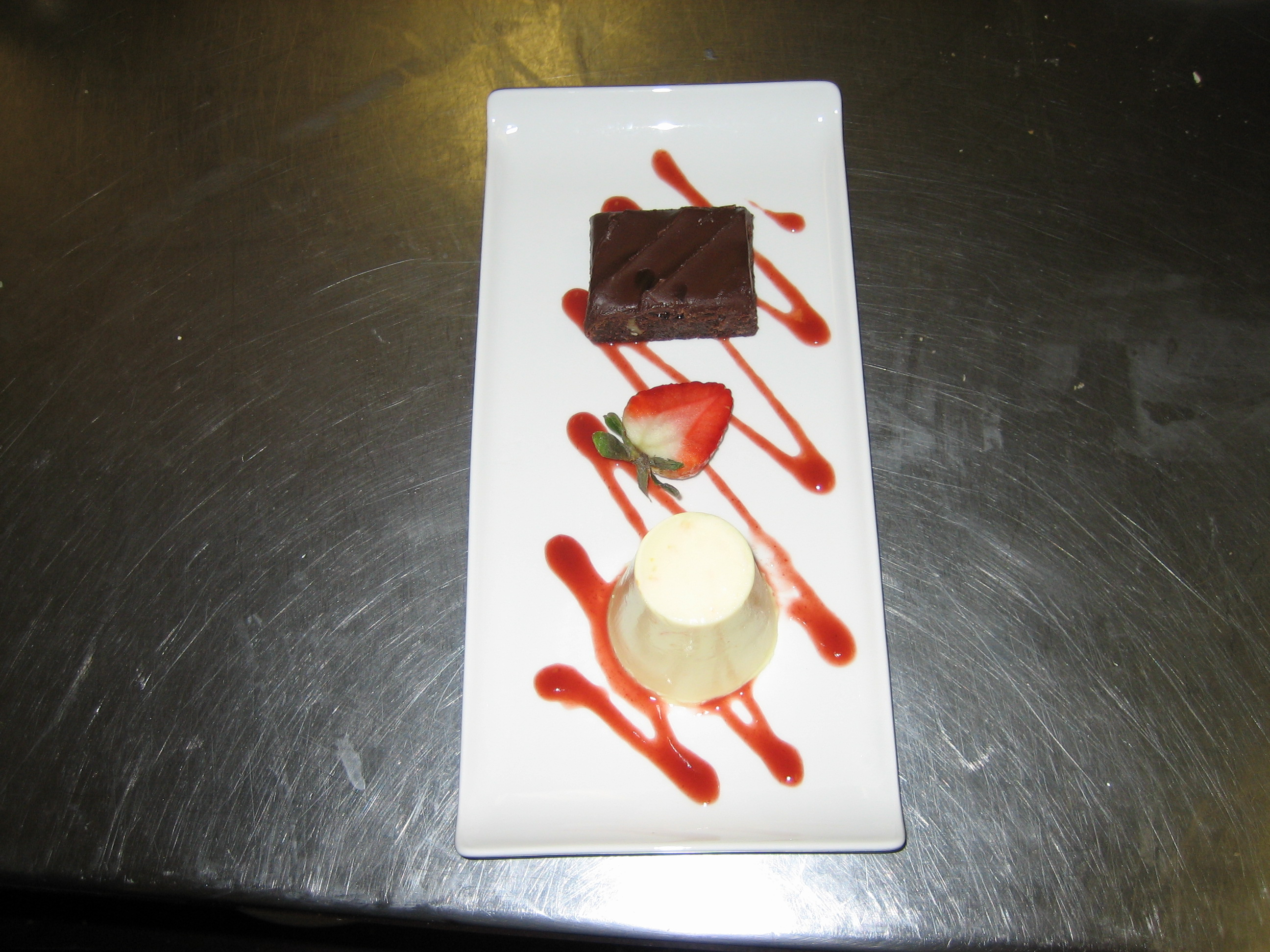
Panna cotta with a strawberry coulis

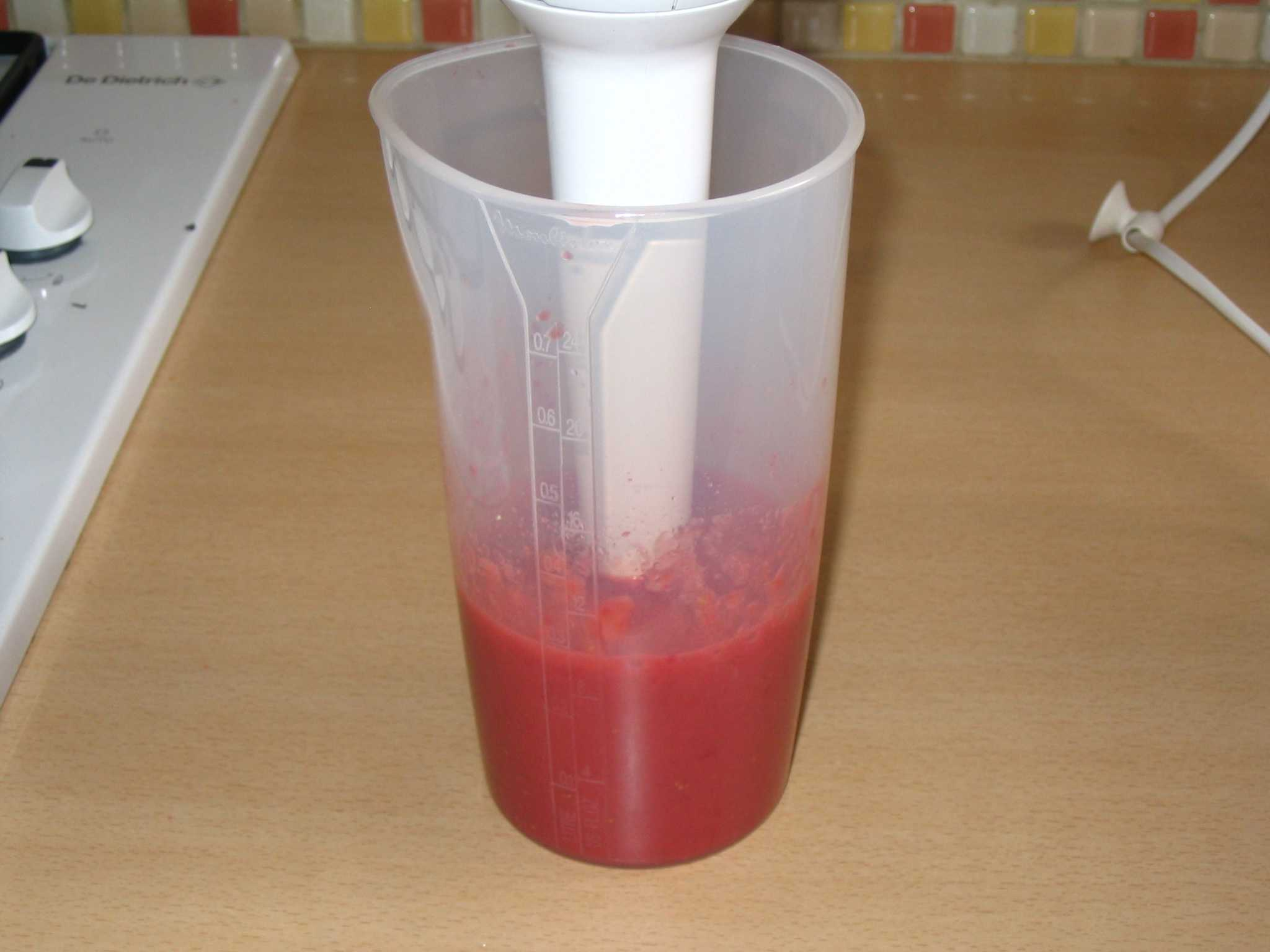
Preparation of the strawberry coulis

A coulis (/kuːˈliː/ koo-LEE) is a thin sauce made from puréed and strained vegetables or fruits. A vegetable coulis is commonly used on meat and vegetable dishes, and can also be used as a base for soups or other sauces. Fruit coulis are most often used on desserts. Raspberry coulis, for example, is especially popular with poached apples or Key lime pie. Tomato coulis may be used to add flavor to other sauces or served on its own (either cold or hot).

The term comes from Old French coleïs, meaning 'flowing' or 'running'.

The way of making coulis varies with the type of fruit or vegetable used: it is possible to simply mash raspberries and strawberries through a strainer with a spoon, while ripe pears and melons are usually pureed in a blender prior to straining; apples have to be cooked first. Depending on the consistency of the puree, either a chinois (for the softest purees), food mill, or drum sieve (for the hardest ones) can be used for straining. Reduction of coulis (to strengthen its sweetness and flavor) can be difficult, as the sauce may acquire a jam-like taste when heated, so sometimes vacuum evaporation is used to boil the mixture at a lower temperature.

== Additives ==
While fruit coulis can be used with its natural flavor, a small amount of fruit brandy (Kirsch, framboise, mirabelle) is occasionally added when under-ripe fruits are used. Desserts that are not very sweet, like brioche, can benefit from coulis with added sugar, while the taste of ice cream, on the other hand, improves with a contrasting, unsweetened sauce.

== Older uses ==
In its current meaning, the term is fairly new in the English language, with widespread use, alongside nouvelle cuisine, since the 1980s. (The Merriam-Webster Dictionary provides 1952 as the first recorded use in the modern sense.) However, originally with the spelling cullis, the word has six hundred years of history in the English language, derived from an Old French word coleis (originally from Latin cōlāre, 'to strain'), meaning straining, pouring, flowing, or sliding (the meaning preserved in English "colander"). The term was used to denote strained broth, originally likely made from chicken, later also from meat and fish. The cullis was used as a sauce or as a base for other sauces.

== See also ==
- Compote
- Dessert sauce
- List of dessert sauces

== Sources ==
- Peterson, J. (2017). Sauces: Classical and Contemporary Sauce Making, Fourth Edition. Houghton Mifflin Harcourt. ISBN 978-0-544-81982-5.
- Ayto, John (2012). The Diner's Dictionary (2nd ed.). Oxford University Press. doi:10.1093/acref/9780199640249.001.0001. ISBN 978-0-19-964024-9.
