= Niccola della Tuccia =

15th Century Viterbese Chronicler

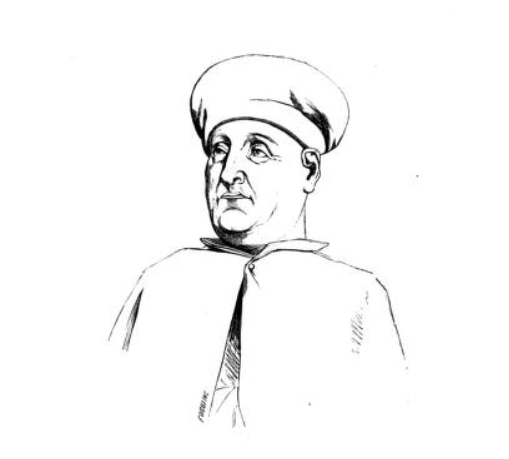
- Portrait, 1872

Personal details
- Born: November 1, 1400 Viterbo, Papal States
- Died: 1472–1476 Likely Rome, Papal States

Niccola della Tuccia or Nicholas of Tuccia (November 1, 1400 – 1472) was a 15th-century Viterbese chronicler and orator under Pope Nicholas V, Callixtus III, Pius II, and Paul II. His surname suggests that he made a sacred vow of celibacy associated with the virtue of Tuccia and her gens. He is most known for writing the Cronaca di Viterbo that speaks on many events within Italy and beyond, including the Fall of Constantinople in 1453.

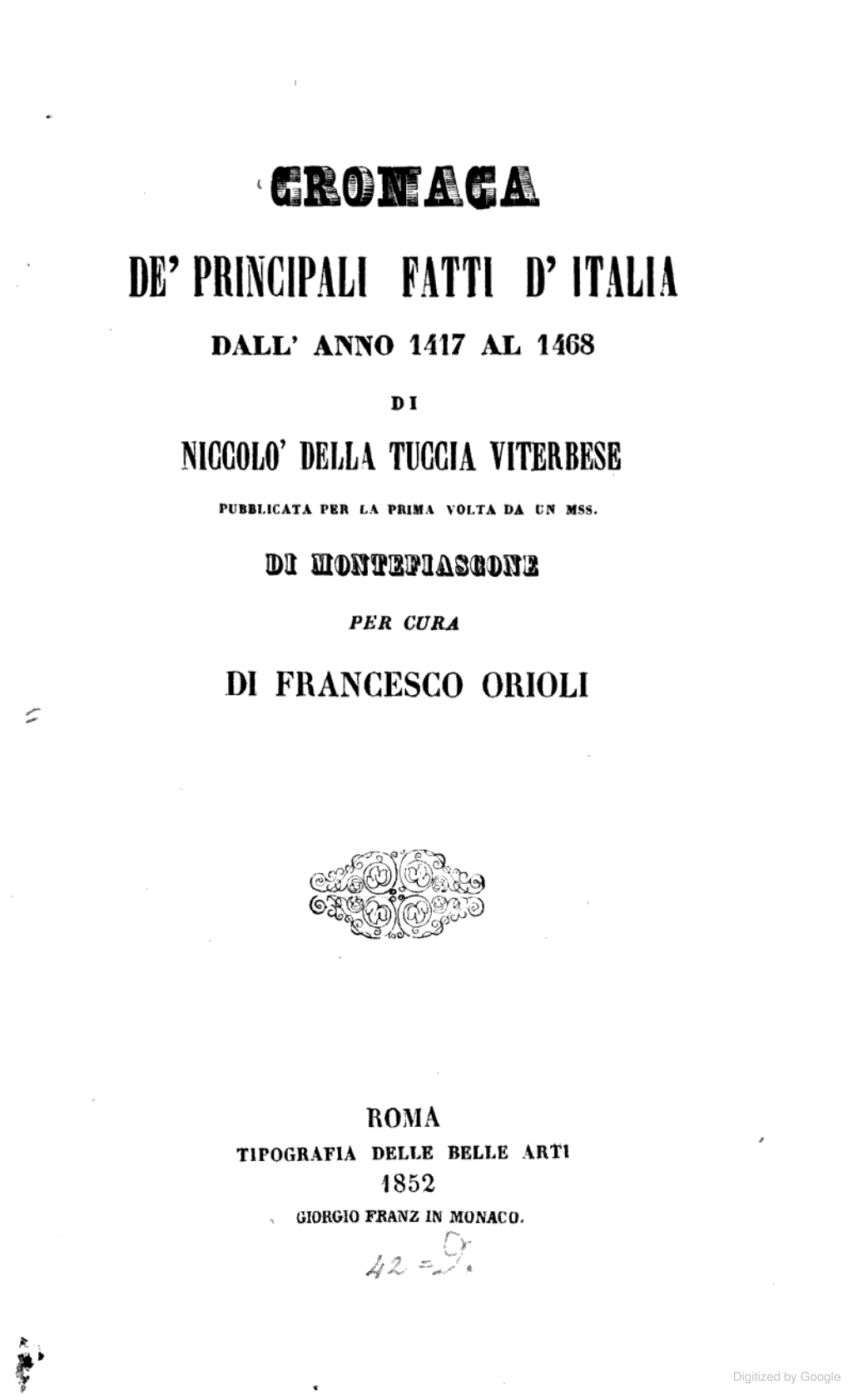
Chronicle of the Principal Events of Italy from the Year 1417 to 1468, 1852 reprint
