= Collender =

Collender may refer to:

- Collender, a family name of European origin
- H.W. Collender Co., a billiard equipment manufacturer of New York which merged with the Brunswick & Balke Company in 1884 to form today's Brunswick Corporation

== See also ==
- Colander
