= Plimpton Sieve Portrait of Queen Elizabeth I =

1579 painting by George Gower

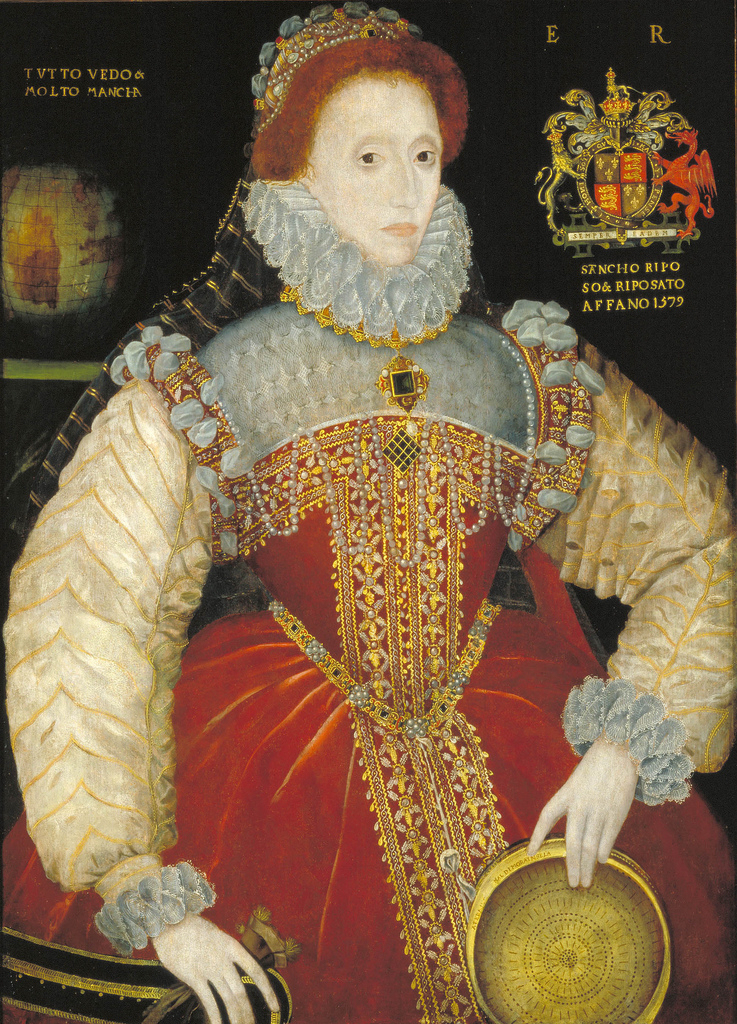
- Artist: George Gower
- Year: 1579
- Medium: Oil on wood
- Dimensions: 104.4 cm × 76.2 cm (41.1 in × 30.0 in)
- Location: Folger Shakespeare Library, Washington, D.C.

The Plimpton Sieve Portrait of Queen Elizabeth I is an oil painting by English painter George Gower dated 1579, and now in the collection of the Folger Shakespeare Library in Washington, D.C. It is one of three near-identical portraits of Elizabeth I by Gower that represent the queen holding a symbolic sieve. It was acquired by George Arthur Plimpton in 1930, hence the name. His son, Francis T. P. Plimpton, willed it to the Folger.

== Iconographic description ==
Three-quarter length portrait of Queen Elizabeth I holding a sieve, with a globe in the left background and the royal coat of arms on the right. The sieve represents her self-identification as the "Virgin Queen" by association with Tuccia, the Roman Vestal Virgin who proved her virginity by carrying water in a sieve.

== Inscriptions ==
The painting has three areas of text in yellow uppercase letters:

- "TVTTO VEDO & MOLTO MANCHA" at upper left, on two lines, with the last two letters joined; Italian for "I see everything and much is lacking."
- "E R" at upper right, with a gap between the letters; abbreviation for the Latin "Elizabeth Regina" meaning "Elizabeth the Queen."
- "STANCHO RIPOSO & RIPOSATO AFFANO 1579" near the upper right, on three lines, with the second and third letters superimposed to form one character; a line from Petrarch's Trionfo D'Amore, IV, 1.145, followed by the year the painting was executed; Italian for "Weary, I have rested, and having rested, am breathless."

== Other versions ==
There are at least two other versions of Gower's Sieve Portrait. One is known only through an 18th-century description by George Vertue. The other measures 34 x 24 inches and is now in a private collection in Florida.
