= Pickle lifter =

Device for lifting pickled goods from a container

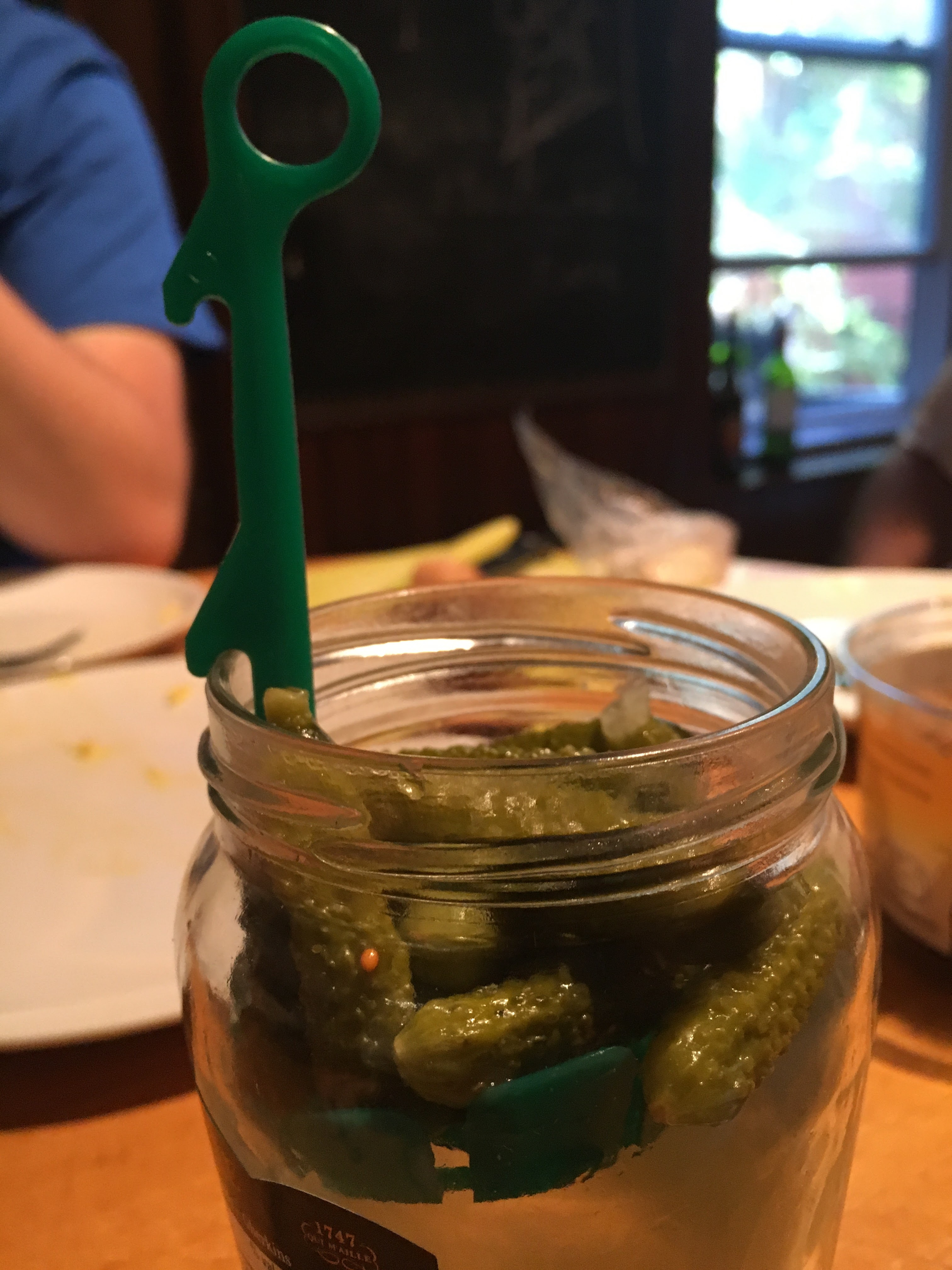
Green plastic pickle lifter in a jar of Maille cornichons

A pickle lifter or lifting tray is a device for elevating food from a container to make it more accessible for extraction. Typically, it acts as a strainer to assist in raising pickles and cornichons from their brine solution towards the top of a jar or container. Those used in commercial products are often made of plastic, while some are made of metal.

The Tupperware corporation makes a product under the trademark Pick-A-Deli that contains a built-in pickle lifter in the form of a lift-up strainer.
