= Gyratory equipment =

Tool

Gyratory equipment, used in mechanical screening and sieving is based on a circular motion of the machine. Unlike other methods, gyratory screen operates in a gentler manner and is more suited to handle fragile things, enabling it to produce finer products. This method is applicable for both wet and dry screening.

A distinct difference to other techniques is that the gyratory motion applied here depends on eccentric weights instead of vibrations, which can be varied based on individual process requirement.

== History ==
In the early 1930s, most vibratory separators had a rectangular or square design employing simple reciprocating movement. After the introduction of machines utilizing gyratory motion with orbital movements, there was a huge change in machinery industry due to the much greater screen area usage and capacity per unit mesh area.

== Design ==
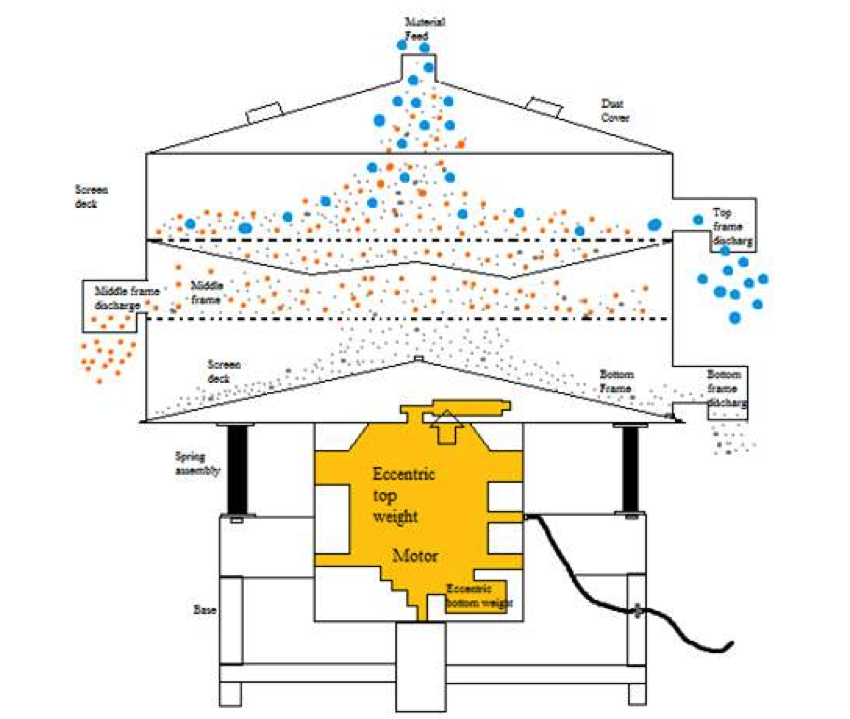
Schematic diagram of a gyratory screener

The gyratory equipment contains decks of cards on top of each other with the coarsest screen on top and the finest below. The feed is inserted from the top and gyratory motion triggers the penetration of particles into the next deck through screen openings.

Casings are inclined at relatively low angles (< 15°) to the horizontal plane, with gyrations occurring in the vertical plane. The eccentric masses can be varied in such as the increase of top eccentric mass leads to an increase in horizontal throw, promoting the discharge of oversize materials. Increment in bottom eccentric mass boosts the material turn over on the screen surface, maximizing the quantity of undersize-material penetration. Oversize materials are discharged via tangential outlet.

The option to select number of decks enables gyratory equipment to accurately separate materials consisting particles that are very close in size. This advantage is unrivalled and proves to be significant in the powder processing industry where fine materials are involved. High separating efficiency and ease of maintenance puts gyratory screening ahead compared to other processes in terms of product quality.

Existing gyratory equipment designs are already on the market, more to come with further development. Recent studies have shown that potential improvements are available for cost-saving and effective separation process.

== Applications ==
Gyratory motion

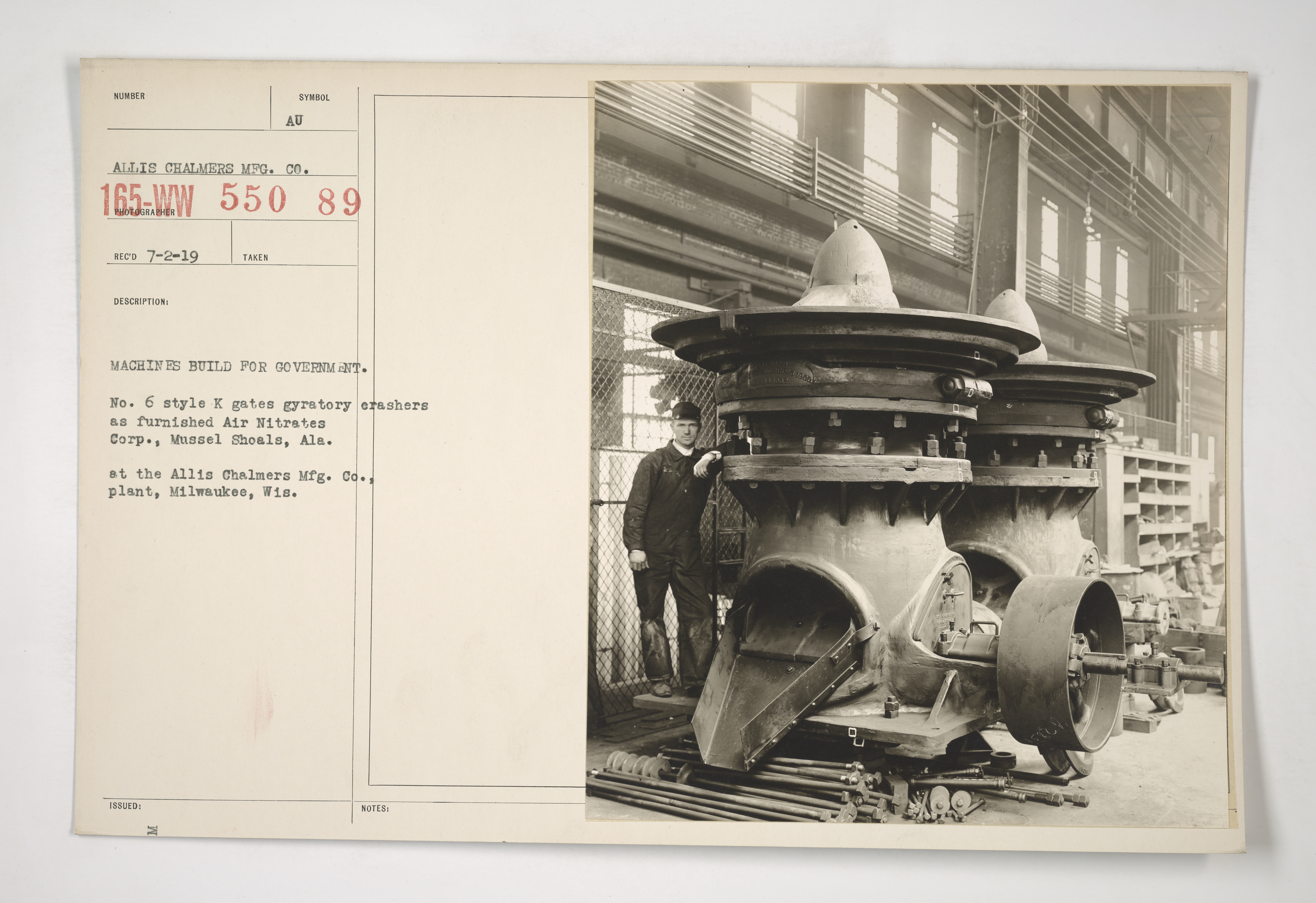
Gyratory crashers

Common applications include separation used in the process industry, food industry, chemical industry and pharmaceuticals. This includes screening, classification, sifting, fiber recovery, filtration, and scalping. Gyratory screening is capable of separating finer materials as compared to other methods, and is therefore more suitable to treat fragile materials. Several applications in respective industries are shown in the table below.

Industry	Applications
Process	Processing ceramics, pulp and paper mill, paints, sand, starch slurry
Food	Screening of refined table salt, papaya cubes, turmeric pigment; clarification of alkaline extracts
Chemical	Screening hydrate lime, effluent overflow from hydrocyclone; classification of polyester beads, anhydrous aluminium chloride

General and industrial heavy duty models are available for gyratory equipment, with wooden frames for general models aiming to save cost. Industrial heavy duty models are constructed with carbon steel or stainless steel. Screen capacities vary with model sizes over a huge range to satisfy individual application requirements such as material size, bulk density, moisture contamination, etc. Models consist up to seven decks with screenings up to 325 meshes, allowing it to perform accurate separations for the finest materials. This feature comes in handy in the powder processing industry where fine powders with relatively close sizes are involved. Screens openings for different decks are to be calculated accurately to ensure accurate separation.

General models, installed with wooden frames indicating lesser reinforcements, are used for applications involving materials with distinct difference in sizes. An example for this is the removal of impurities from wood chips for biomass fuel production. In this case, the desired product will be discharged at the coarsest screen, leaving smaller impurities to sink to the bottom frames. These models are selected for more economical purposes and are less common.

== Comparison to other methods ==
=== Advantages ===
- Low running cost

The low amount of power required to run a gyratory screener enables an overall low cost of operation for this machine. This is due to the relatively lower energy required for gyratory motion compared to vibrating a massive frame. The low running cost as well as the low purchasing cost of gyratory equipment make it one of the more commonly used machines for solid-solid mechanical separation.

- Ideal for multi-fraction separation

As a gyratory screening machine employs the use of smaller stacked screen frames, the screens can be accurately placed to the precise requirements of each separation. This puts a gyratory screener at an advantage over a number of other mechanical screening devices, as many other devices would require the use of additional equipment to cope with a different type of feed.

- Flexible range of applications

A gyratory screener can be used in many situations, regardless of whether the solid-solid mixture to be separated consists of a binary mixture, or a multi-fraction mixture. This is because the flexibility of usage of the gyratory sifter screens eliminates the need for excess screen materials, cleaners or other forms of additional apparatus.

- Good efficiency and quality of separation

The lack of vertical motion in the mechanism of a gyratory sifter, coupled with its relatively gentle motion enables a higher accuracy in the separation of materials in the solid-solid mixture. The longer stroke involved in gyratory machines allows the finer particles to settle down and spread out. This, coupled with the horizontal motion used maximises the opportunity for the finer particles to pass, thus enhancing the quality and efficiency of separation.

- Easily maintained

Most modern day gyratory screening machines employ the use of screen cleaners, which act to prevent any clogging of the gyratory sifters. The motion and mechanism of a gyratory screener enables more energy to be imparted onto the cleaners, thus actively preventing the occurrence of build-up on the gyratory sifters. In the long run, the prevention of build-up in the sifters would enable the gyratory screener to have a longer lifespan.

- Low screen blinding

Vibration at the vertical component by the bottom eccentric weight significantly reduces screen blinding. Additional ball trays and Kleen rings can further reduce screen blinding.

=== Limitations ===
- Large amount of floor space

The large area of the gyratory screen requires a large floor space to be reserved. This may cause logistical problems in cases where space needs to be optimised and efficiently used.

- Relatively difficult to operate

The gyratory sifter has a complex flow pattern, as well a complex drive mechanism, which is more complex than most other sifters. This could pose problems, as the complexity of the operating mechanism makes the unit harder to operate.

- Susceptible to lumps and agglomerates in the feed

The gyratory sifter operates at a gentle pace, and has a non-robust motion during operation. The gentle motion involved will not break up any lumps or agglomerates found in the feed. Thus, the lumps in the feed would be discarded in the top frame discharge, along with other large particles.

== Operating characteristics ==
Gyratory equipment is divided to a top and a bottom unit. The unit on top consists of screening frames supported with rugged springs attached to the circular base, which allows free vibration of the top unit. Secondary support springs are attached to for heavy duty operation, preventing the vibration of the top unit from reaching the floor. The base of the machine (bottom unit) consists of top and bottom eccentric weights attached to a heavy duty motor. Minimum energy is consumed with the installation of double extended shafts on the motors, which are attached to both the top and bottom eccentric weights. Screen decks can be mounted on top of another within the machine assembly with spacing frames connected together via stainless steel quick release clamps.

There are large amounts of gyratory equipment designs available with some possible design characteristics include:

- Feed rates of 1–50,000 kg/h
- Screen layers up to 7
- Operating frequency of rotation at 700–1450 rpm
- Screening area of 1800–24,800 cm^{2}
- Screen diameter of 600–1500 mm
- Power consumption of 5.5–7.5 kW
- Mesh openings of 20 μm – 20 mm
- Construction material

Gyratory equipment is capable of handling feeds of 500 tons/(h·m^{2}) with separation efficiency up to 98% for dry processes, with feed materials to be separated not below a diameter of 4 μm.

Wet processes in the other hand can only manage a relatively high efficiency (85%) if the moisture content is above 70%.

Eccentric weights can be varied accordingly to obtain desired ratio of coarse vs fine products.

== Assessment of characteristics ==
Separation efficiency factor is given by the equation:

$Efficiency\;Factor = \frac{m_{o}\;M_{o}}{C\;(1-m_{o})}$	1

where $m_{\text{o}}$ is the fraction of undersize in oversize and $M_{\text{o}}$ is the mass of oversize in feed.

However, correction coefficient factor is to be included in the event of multiple decks are involved, as stated in the table below.

Deck Position	Correction Factor
Top deck	1.0
2nd deck	0.9
3rd deck	0.8
4th deck	0.7

This is due to the error carried forward for every deck. Efficiency factor is multiplied by the correction factor to obtain a more accurate estimate.

The degree of removal of wet processes is lower than their dry counterparts, which is explained by the change in physico-mechanical properties of the body.

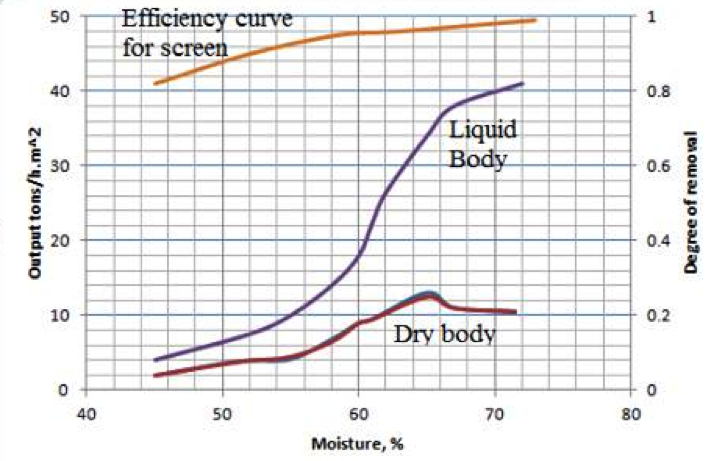
Relationship between moisture content and separation efficiency

The trend of the curve displays that feed materials with a moisture content above 70% is more suited for gyratory screening.

Both top and bottom eccentric weights play a big role in sorting a ratio of coarse versus fine products. Kinetic moment produced by the additional eccentric weights changes the oscillation swing, hence producing outputs of different rates and compositions. Increasing the upper eccentric weight promotes discharge of the coarse material. An increase in the lower eccentric weight maximizes the quantity discharged below. The relationships are demonstrated in the table below for a fixed design:

Kinetic Moment (kg·cm)	Output (Top:Bottom)	Kinetic Moment (kg·cm)	Output (Top:Bottom)
0	1.00	0	1.00
0.37	1.23	0.37	0.589
0.80	1.41	0.80	0.430
1.05	1.53	1.05	0.386
1.39	1.73	-	-
1.74	1.85	-	-

The kinetic moment is linked to eccentric weights with the equations:

$$F_u(\theta) = \begin{bmatrix} {cos[(\theta(t)+\phi)\frac{d}{D_u}]}\;m_u\;r_u\;(\frac{dN \pi}{30D_u})^2\;\eta_x  \\ {sin[(\theta(t)+\phi)\frac{d}{D_u}]}\;m_u\;r_u\;(\frac{dN \pi}{30D_u})^2\;\eta_y  \\ -m_u\;g\;\eta_z \end{bmatrix}$$	2

$$F_n(\theta) = \begin{bmatrix} {cos[-(\theta(t)-\phi)\frac{d}{D_n}]}\;m_n\;r_n\;(\frac{dN \pi}{30D_n})^2\;\eta_x  \\ {sin[-(\theta(t)-\phi)\frac{d}{D_n}]}\;m_n\;r_n\;(\frac{dN \pi}{30D_n})^2\;\eta_y  \\ -m_n\;g\;\eta_z \end{bmatrix}$$	3

$F_s (\theta) = \vert F_u (\theta) + F_1 (\theta) + \cdots + F_n (\theta) \vert$	4

where $\theta$ is the lower or upper wheel position (rad), $\phi$ is the phase angle (rad), $m$ is the mass of wheel, $N$ is the motor shaft input speed (rpm) and $\eta$ is the force transfer coefficient.

Gyratory equipment is only invalid if two or more materials to be separated are finer than 4 μm, which varies with different machine dimensions. The proposed value of 4 μm was calculated using the dimensions of the largest available model with the largest possible gyration radius. The critical velocity, which cannot be exceeded by the materials or else the operation fails, is given by the equation:

$v_c = (D_a-\frac{d_p}{2})\sqrt{ \frac {g} {2D_a} }$	5

where $D_{\text{a}}$ is the length of side of aperture and $d_{\text{p}}$ is the particle diameter.

Gyration inertia formulae allow the calculations for different models with different dimensions.

== Design heuristics ==
Typical gyratory equipment operation circulates around eccentric weight and screen frames. Materials are distributed along the screen surface and undersize materials are allowed to penetrate the screen. A rule of thumb is to be followed for high separation efficiency and smooth operation:

- Slope angle of screen: 10–12° is opted for of highest separation efficiency with desired screening capacity, as displayed in the table below.

Inclination Angle (°)	Output [tons/(h·m^{2})]	Separation Efficiency (%)
2	20.20	86
4	22.35	92
6	24.21	95
8	28.40	97
10	35.12	98
12	46.02	98
14	53.60	96
16	66.55	92

- Area of screen: Larger screen area indicates a higher screening capacity. The largest area available is given as approximately 25,000 cm^{2}, a larger area will cause severe uneven distributions of material along the screen surface.

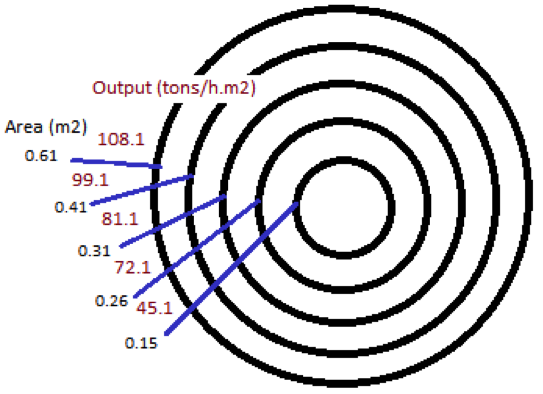
Relationship between area and output

- Number of screen layers: More layers of screening are required for mixtures with materials with close sizes. Screen comes in various types, dimensions and material. Fewer decks is preferred to maintain quality output (< 4).
- Material of frames: Wooden frames are opted for economical operations with simple handling. Carbon steel or stainless steel is selected for heavy duty operations for finer products.
- Operating frequency: Higher revolution per minute indicates more rapid rate of separation at the expense of more energy required, which is provided by a motor.
- Feed points: Single feed port is preferred over multiple feed ports as a far more complicated control is involved despite higher separation coefficient.
- Pre-treatments: It is recommended to prescreen oversize materials that are larger than a 5 mm aperture size to prevent damaging the equipment. Simple sieving equipment is sufficient to screen materials with such big sizes.

== Post-treatment and waste production ==
=== Post-treatment ===
Screening can be carried out in dry or wet basis. Wet screening often requires post treatment, drying as a preparation for the downstream process. In most cases, drying is often used in the final stage of the process, however this can be varied due to the need of the process. Drying process involves the removal of water or other solutes, whereby most of the process are done by vaporization with the aid of heat supply. Thus, efficiency of heat supply equipment plays an important role to optimize the drying process.

Furthermore, this treatment can be applied on the waste stream prior the disposal. Drying greatly reduce the total volume mass of the solid waste, which simplify the handling process and reduce the transportation cost.

The list below states the examples of dryers available for industrial process:

- Rotary dryers
- Tunnel dryers
- Tray or shelf dryers
- Drum dryers
- Spray dryers

=== Waste production ===
Gyratory screener separates solids from liquid or other dry solids according to the particle sizes. Screening is one of the crucial pre-treatment to several industries, such as chemical, food, mining, pharmaceutical, and waste.

Application	Waste stream
Powdered detergent	Oversized granules
Citrus juice	Pulp; Seeds; Peel membrane
Iron ore processing	Oversized iron ore particles
Antibiotic	Undissolved particles; Fine powder
Wastewater	Coarse solids: Large non-biodegradable and floating solids (containers, wood, plastics etc.); Fine solids: Suspended solids (lint, dirt, etc.)

The table above presents the waste stream for several processes that are commonly use in different industries. The example given for chemical industry is the powdered detergent production where gyratory screener is used to filter out the oversized granules found in end product to improve product appearance and dissolve rate. Citrus juice production is the example of food industry. Gyratory screener available in multi-layered planes eliminates all the wastes in several stages. Juice sacs are the desirable element to produce citrus juice. Screening in food industry significantly increases the product quality. Among the ore processing, gyratory screener is used after crushing to filter out the oversized ore particles. These unfavourable particles can be regarded as waste or recycle back to the process. Similarly, in pharmaceutical industry, gyratory screener removes undissolved particles from liquid pharmaceuticals or fine powder that stick on the capsule surface to ease the capsule stamp. As for wastewater treatment, removal of coarse solid wastes from the wastewater stream is exclusively to protect the downstream equipment from damages. Fine solid waste removal acts as pre-treatment for the process, more specifically a primary clarification. The overall screening process enhances system performance, minimize the cost and reduce the need for cleaning of the filter in other equipment.

The waste materials usually travel through a discharge chute for disposal depending on the design of the gyratory screener. There will be at least one outlet for every deck of gyratory screener.
