= Food mill =

Kitchen utensil for mashing and sieving soft foods

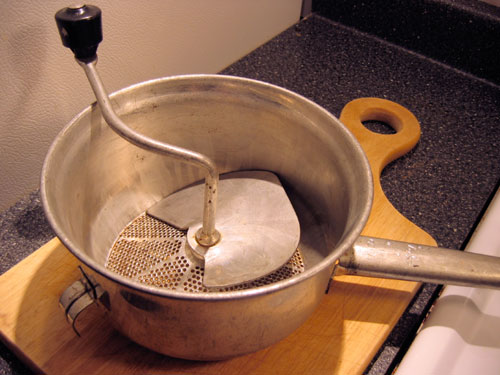

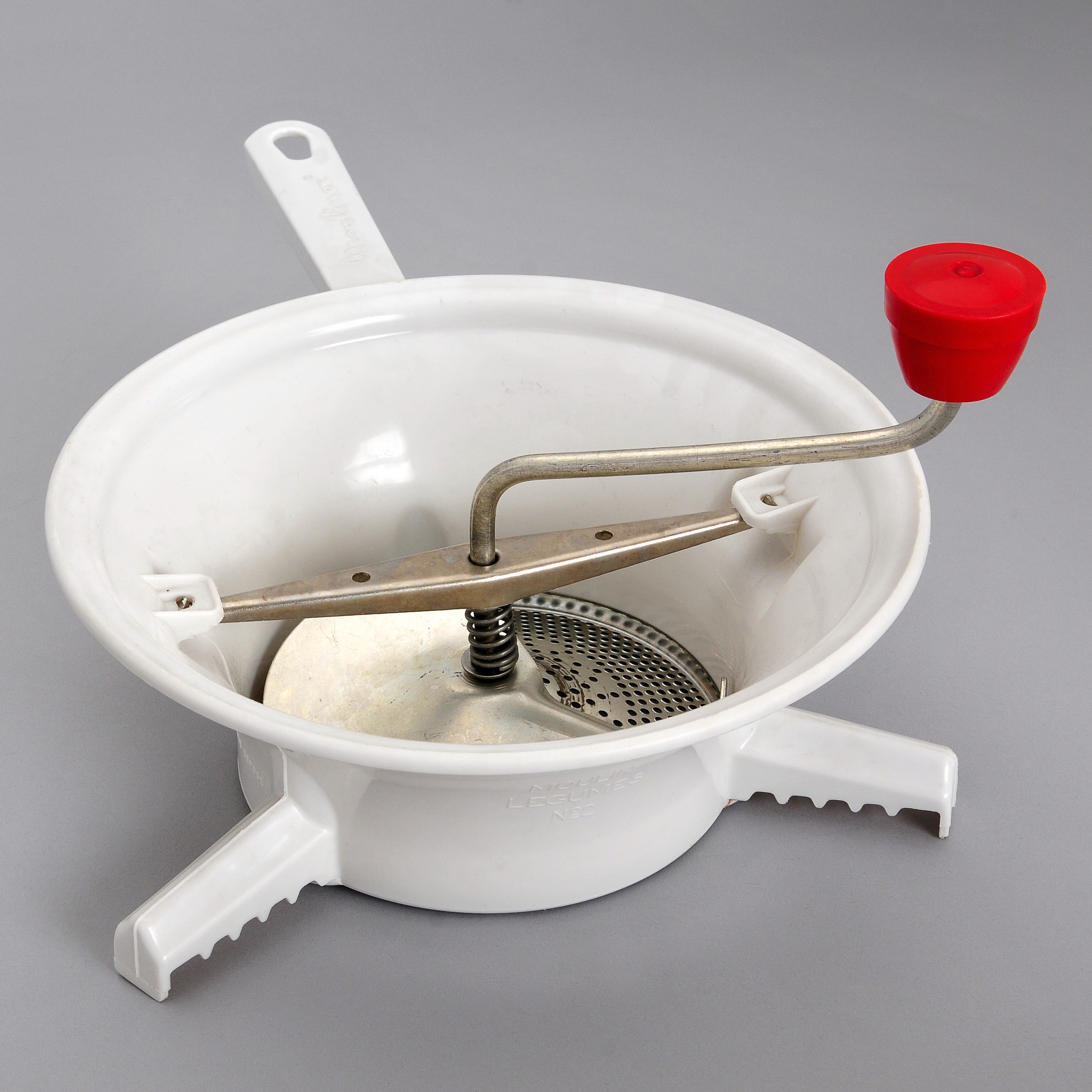
Moulin Legumes No.2

A food mill (also called passatutto, purée sieve, moulinette, mouli légumes, passe-vite, or triturator) is a food preparation utensil for mashing and sieving soft foods invented in Brussels in 1928 by Victor Simon. Typically, a food mill consists of three parts: a bowl, a bottom plate with holes like those in a colander, and a crank fitted with a bent metal blade that crushes the food and forces it through the holes in the plate. The bottom plate may be a permanent part of the device, or interchangeable plates with different hole sizes may be supplied. Three corrugated feet on the base, or two ears on the rim plus the handle, fit on the rim of a cooking pot and hold the mill in position over it.

Food mills are usually made of stainless steel or aluminum. The bowl may be plastic, particularly for smaller sizes marketed for preparing baby food. Older "heirloom" utensils were usually made from tinplate.

This piece of kitchen equipment, of long-proven efficiency, bridges the gap between a sieve (or tamis, china cap, or chinoise) and the electric blender or food processor. Its function is similar to that of a potato ricer or "hob" type of spätzle maker.

Uses of a food mill include removing the seeds from cooked tomatoes, removing pulp or larger pieces from foods (creating apple jelly or any type of purée), and making mashed potatoes or spätzle. A metal sieve used with a wooden spoon or pestle may be found more effective for puréeing fibrous foodstuffs such as marmalade oranges.

== See also ==
- Blade grinder
- Grater
- List of food preparation utensils
