= Zaru =

Japanese kitchen utensil

A zaru (笊, ざる) is generally a flat or shallow basket made from bamboo used in the preparation and presentation of Japanese cuisine. It also has variations made of plastic or metal similar to a strainer, sieve or colander.

Zaru are air dried after use to prevent the growth of bacteria or fungi on the mat and extend their lifespan. However, drying in harsh sunlight can cause the bamboo of the zaru to crack.

Reflecting the zaru's capacity to soak up liquid, this term is also used as slang for a person who can drink a lot of alcohol without showing signs of inebriation.

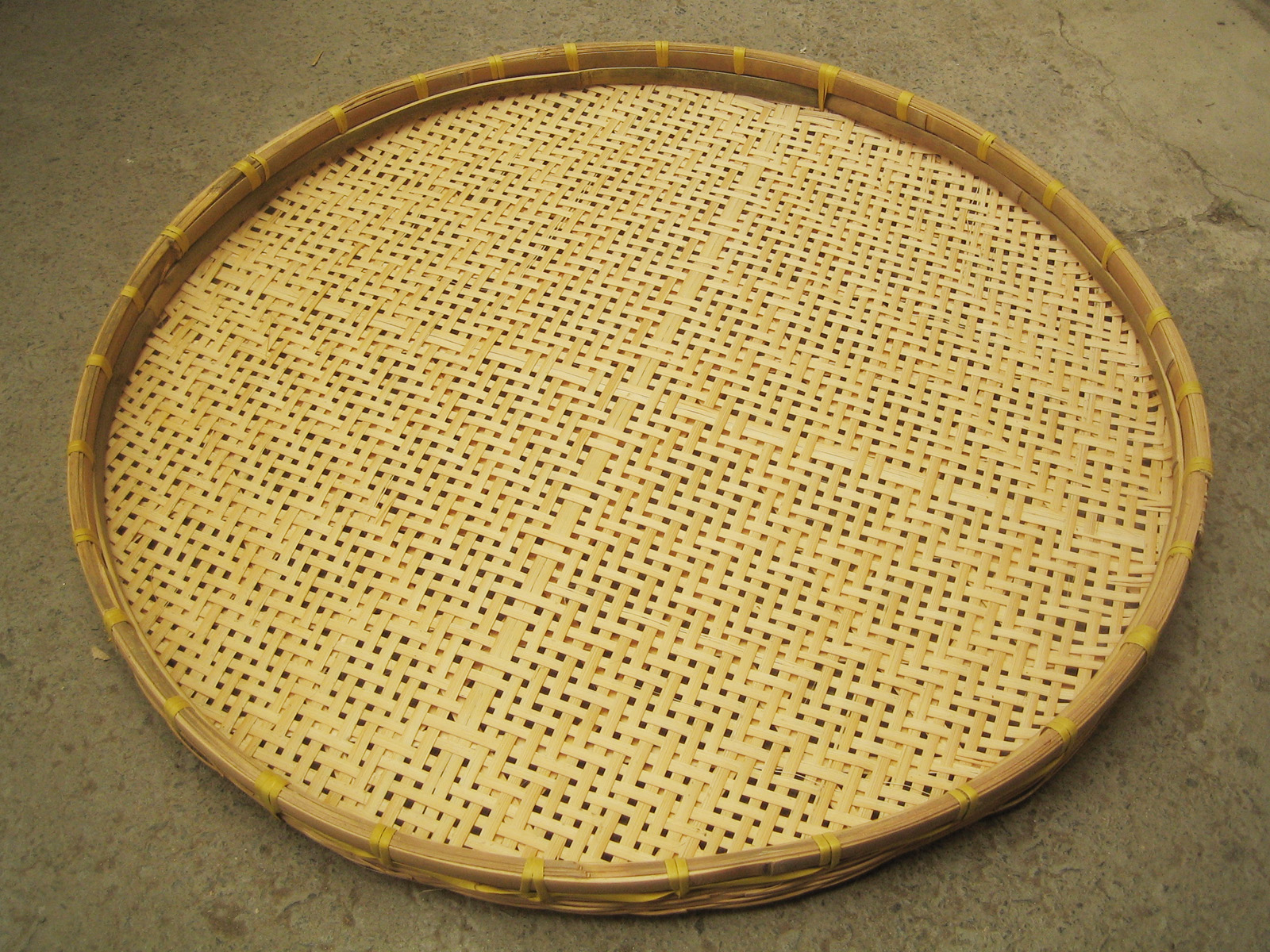
Zaru made from bamboo

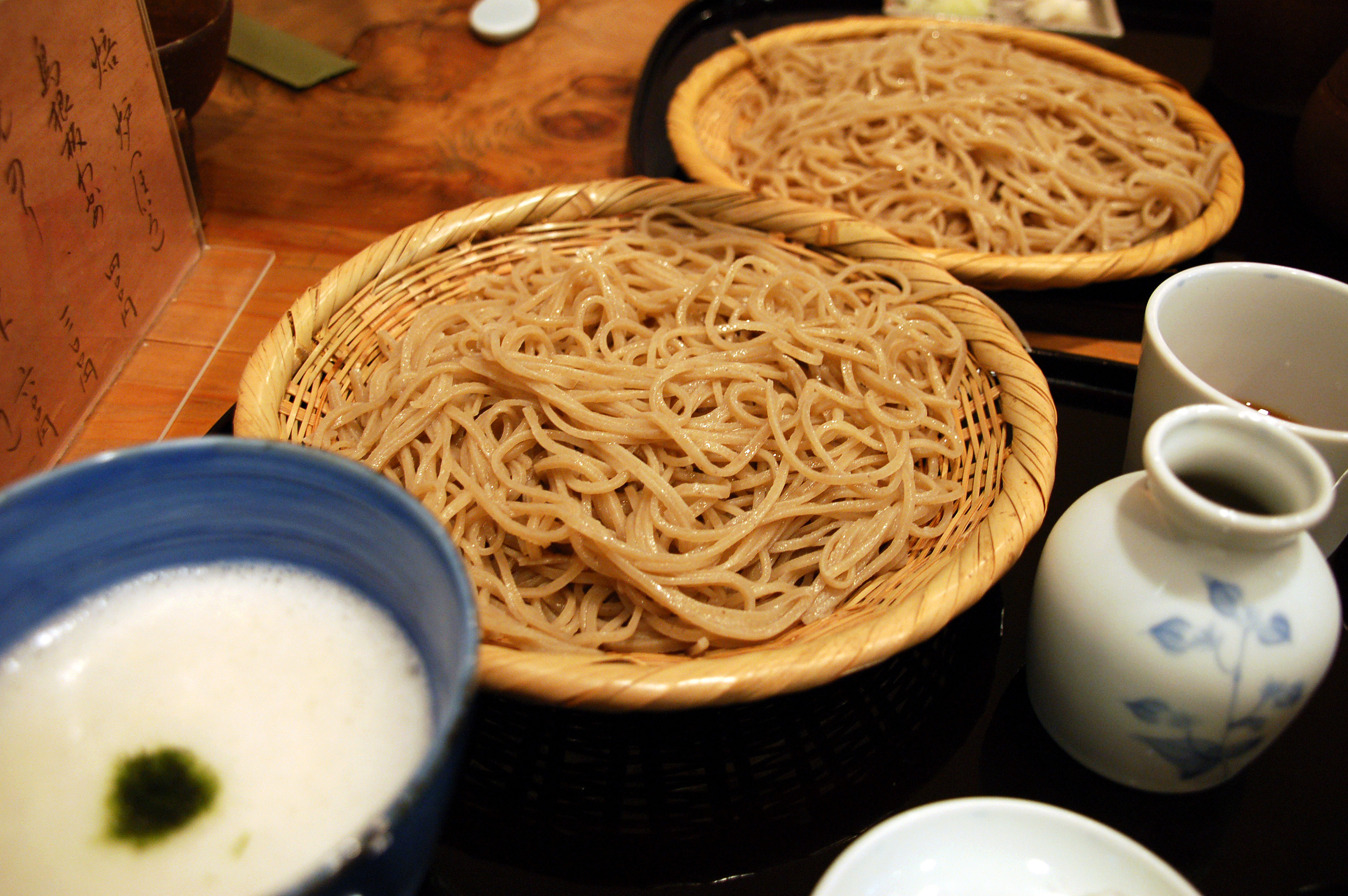
Soba served on a zaru

== See also ==
- List of Japanese cooking utensils
- Chinois
- Filter
- Sokuri
