= Chinois =

Conical strainer (cooking utensil)

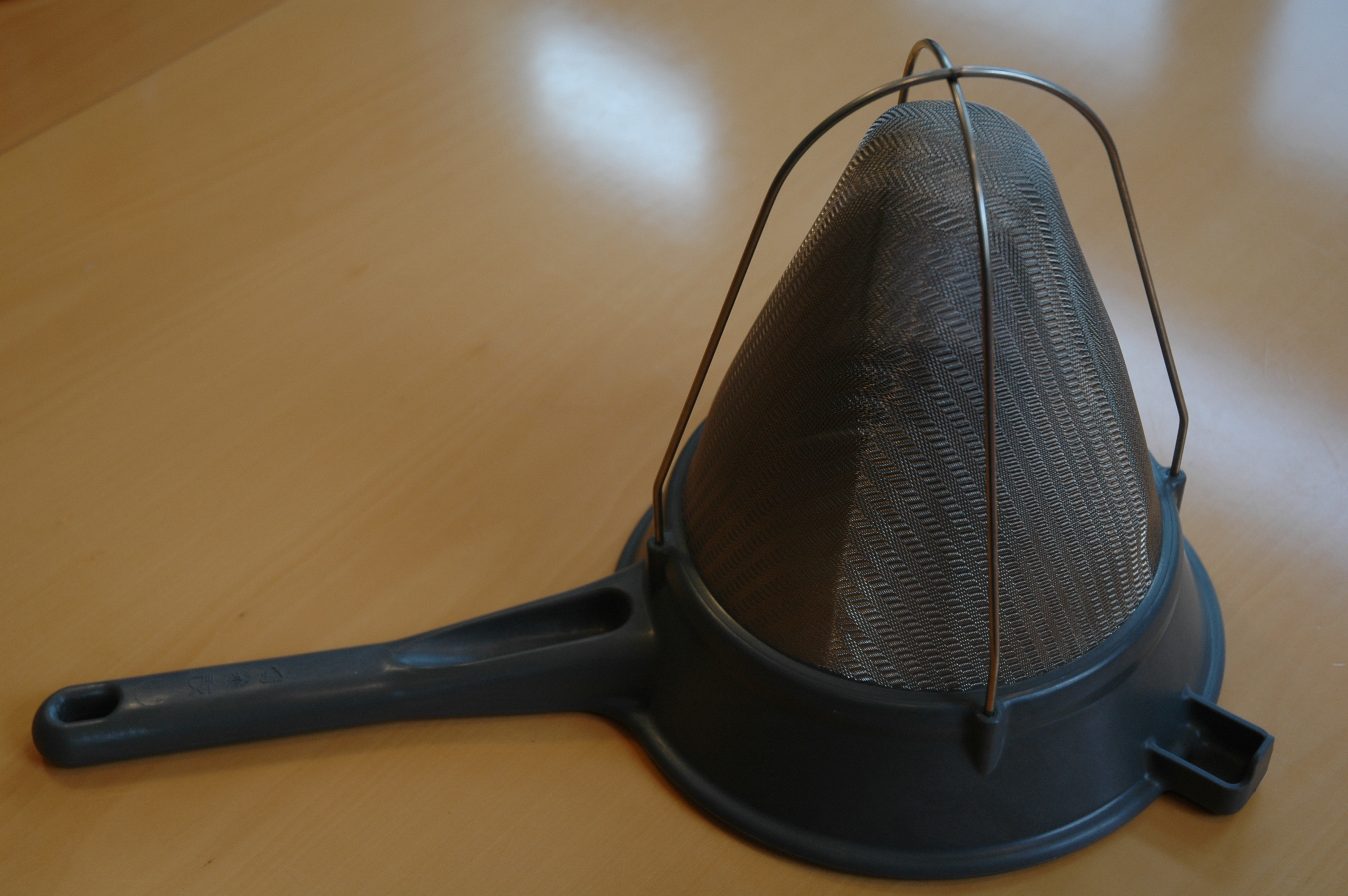
A French-made chinois from a commercial kitchen

A chinois (UK: /ˈʃɪnwɑː, ˈʃiːnwɑː/ SHIN-wah, SHEE-nwah, US: /ʃiːˈnwɑː/ shee-NWAH; French: [ʃinwa]), also known as a bouillon strainer, is a conical sieve with an extremely fine mesh. It is used to strain custards, purees, soups, and sauces, producing a very smooth texture. It can also be used to dust food with a fine layer of powdered ingredient.

== Etymology ==
Chinois is a loanword from French where the adjective means "Chinese". The name refers not to the utensil's origin but to its resemblance to an Asian conical hat.

== Comparison with the China cap ==
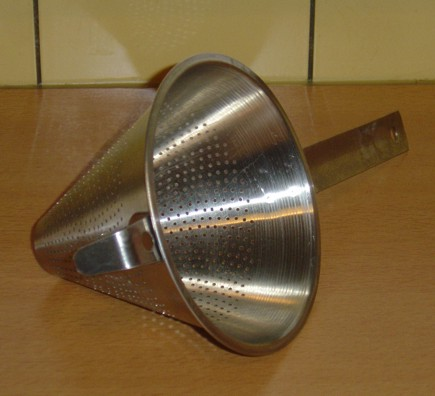
A China cap, or conical strainer

A similarly shaped utensil is the China cap (also named for its resemblance to Asian conical hats). It is a perforated metal conical strainer with much larger holes than a chinois. A China cap is used to remove seeds and other coarse matter from soft foods, but produces a coarser-textured product than the chinois.

Both the chinois and the China cap often are used with a cone-shaped pestle. With the pestle tip placed in the bottom of the strainer, it is rolled against the sides of the device to work liquids and soft food through it. In this way, the chinois functions much like a tamis and the China cap, a food mill. A small ladle is also sometimes used instead of a pestle. This allows the user to scoop solids from the sides of the strainer as well as pressing liquid through the mesh.

== See also ==
- Colander
- Filter
- Zaru
