= Tuccia =

Ancient Roman Vestal Virgin

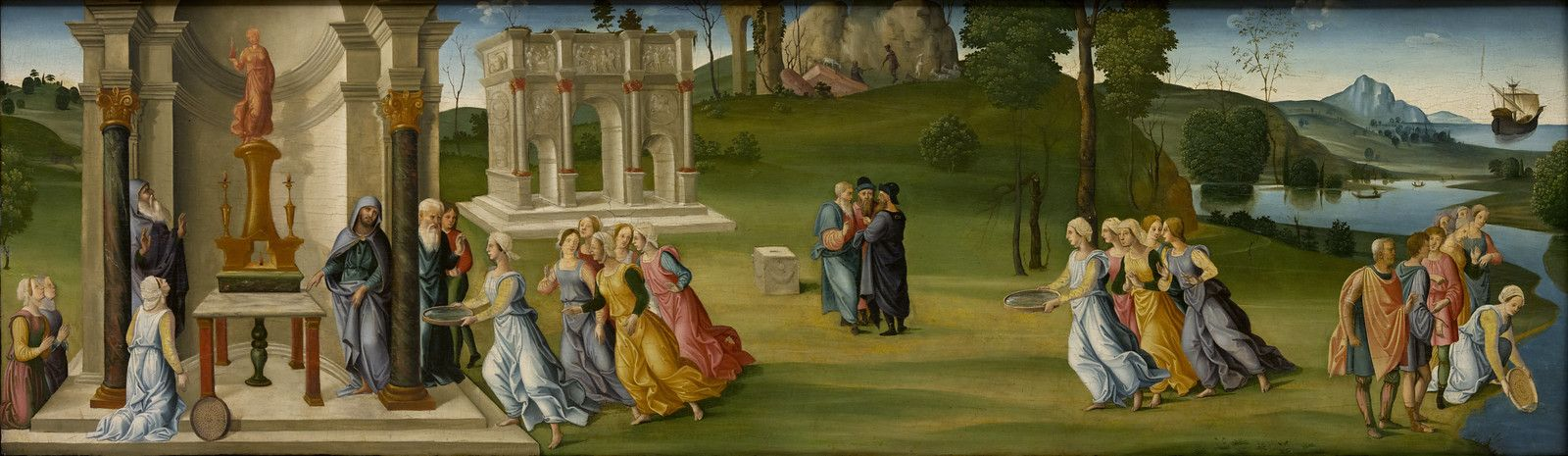
Tuccia, in a painting by Francesco Granacci

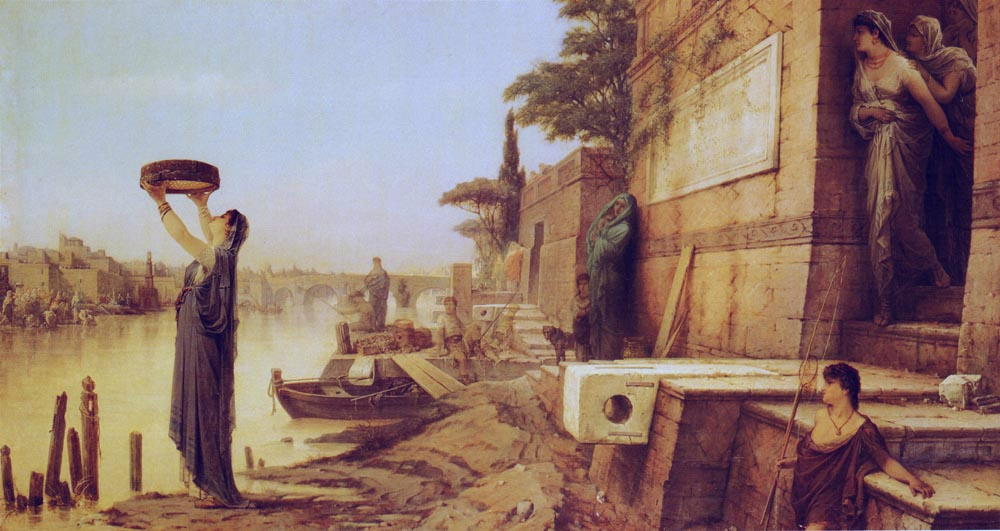
Hector Leroux, La Vestale Tuccia, 1874.

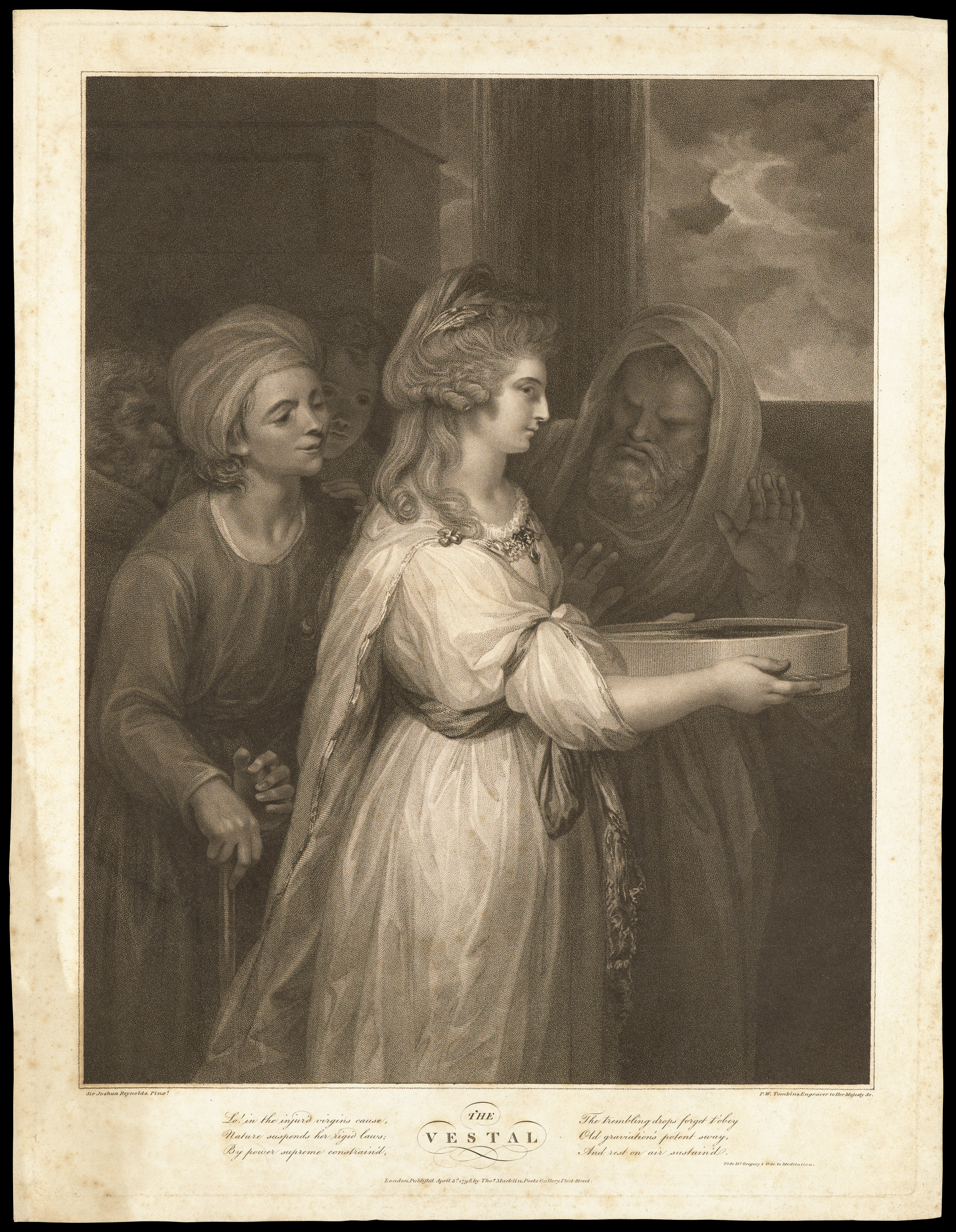
'The Vestal' by Joshua Reynolds, showing Tuccia.

Tuccia (3rd-century BC), was an ancient Roman Vestal Virgin. It's supposed by her nomen that she belonged to the gens Tuccia. She is known for an incident in which her chastity was questioned by a spurious accusation. The punishment for vestal virgins who lost their chastity was immurement. In Tuccia's case, to save her reputation and life, she carried water from the Tiber to the Temple of Vesta in a flat perforated basket without the water falling to the ground through the sieve.

After showing she was as chaste as she said, her accuser was never heard from again.

Vestal virgins were thought to possess magical powers by their service to Vesta and thus by performing this miraculous action Tuccia had not only proven her chastity but also that she was favored by Vesta.

This very act was associated with one of the vestal virgins' ritual duties of fetching pure water which had never come into contact with the earth. The vestals even had special vessels to carry this water which might correspond with Tuccia's sieve.

== Sources for Tuccia ==
Tuccia's proving of her innocence is recounted in the following:

O Vesta, if I have always brought pure hands to your secret services, make it so now that with this sieve I shall be able to draw water from the Tiber and bring it to your temple (Vestal Virgin Tuccia in Valerius Maximus 8.1.5 absol).

Tuccia proved her innocence by carrying a sieve full of water from the Tiber to the Temple of Vesta [Augustine, De Civitate Dei, X, 16, in Worsfold, 69].

The Vestal Tuccia was celebrated in Pliny the Elder's Natural History (28.3) and Petrarch's Triumph of Chastity in Triumphs. However, in Juvenal's Satire VI (famously renamed 'Against Women') he references her as one of many lascivious women.

== Similarities to other stories from antiquity ==
The story of Tuccia shares some similarities with that of Quinta Claudia, a Roman matron who was accused of living an immoral life. To prove her innocence of the charges she performed a miraculous feat with the aid of the goddess Cybele. In paintings, she has often been depicted as a vestal virgin.

When the sacred fire of Vesta went out on one occasion, the vestal virgin Aemilia was accused by the priests of having neglected her duties in order to entertain men. She prayed to Vesta for assistance, and miraculously rekindled it by throwing a piece of her garment upon the extinct embers.

== Tuccia in the arts ==
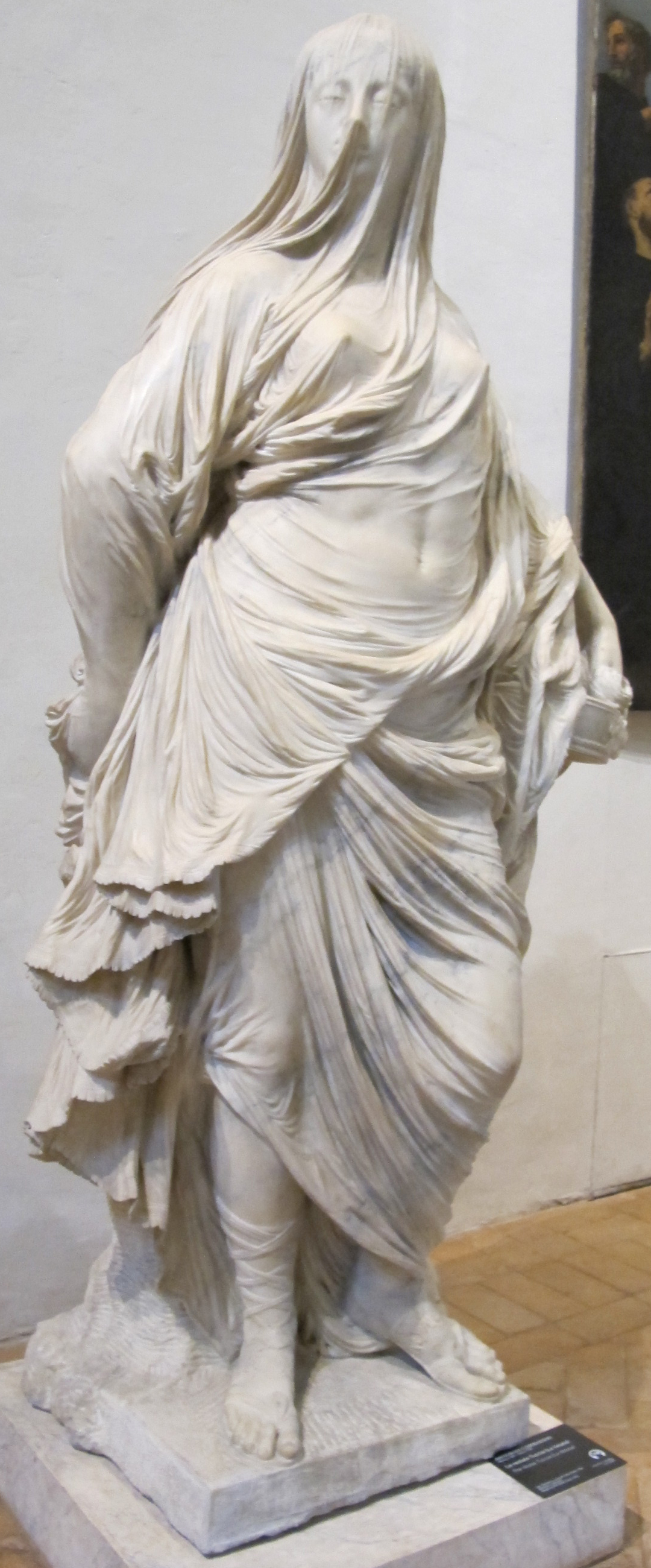
Statue by Antonio Corradini

The Vestal Virgin Tuccia (Italian: La Vestale Tuccia) or Veiled Woman (Italian: La Velata) is a marble sculpture created in 1743 by Antonio Corradini.

== Sieve iconography ==
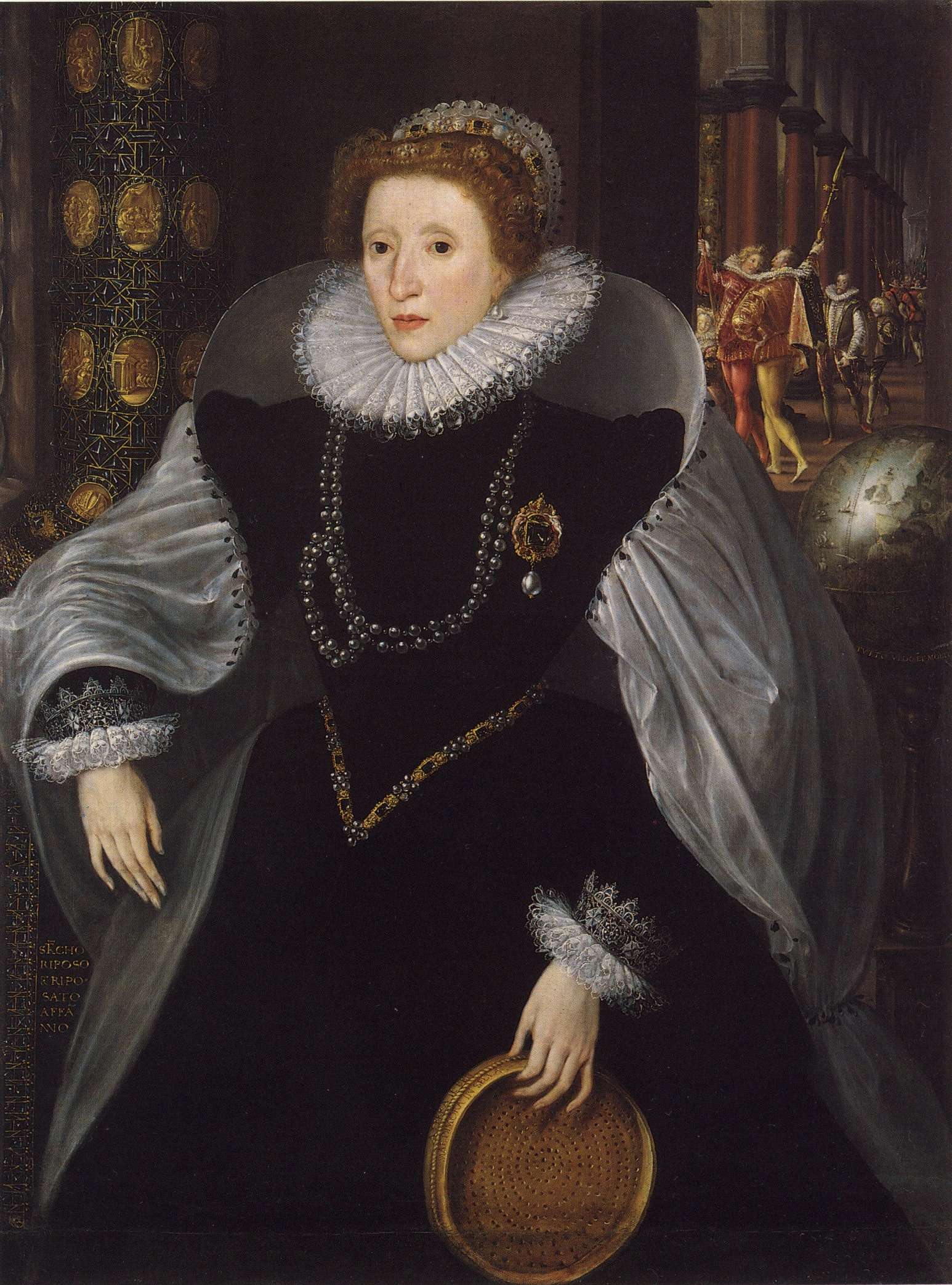
Portrait of Elizabeth I holding a sieve, by Quentin Metsys the Younger

By the late Middle Ages, the image of Tuccia and her sieve had become associated with the virtue of chastity. Paintings of chaste women would often include a sieve, and this symbol figures prominently in many depictions of England's "Virgin Queen" Elizabeth I in the late sixteenth century.

== Other ==
There is a crater named after Tuccia on the asteroid 4 Vesta.

== See also ==
- Vestal Virgin
- Exemplary Women of Antiquity
- Plimpton Sieve Portrait of Queen Elizabeth I
- Vestal Virgin Tuccia (Corradini sculpture)
