= Sieve =

Tool for separation of solid materials by particle size

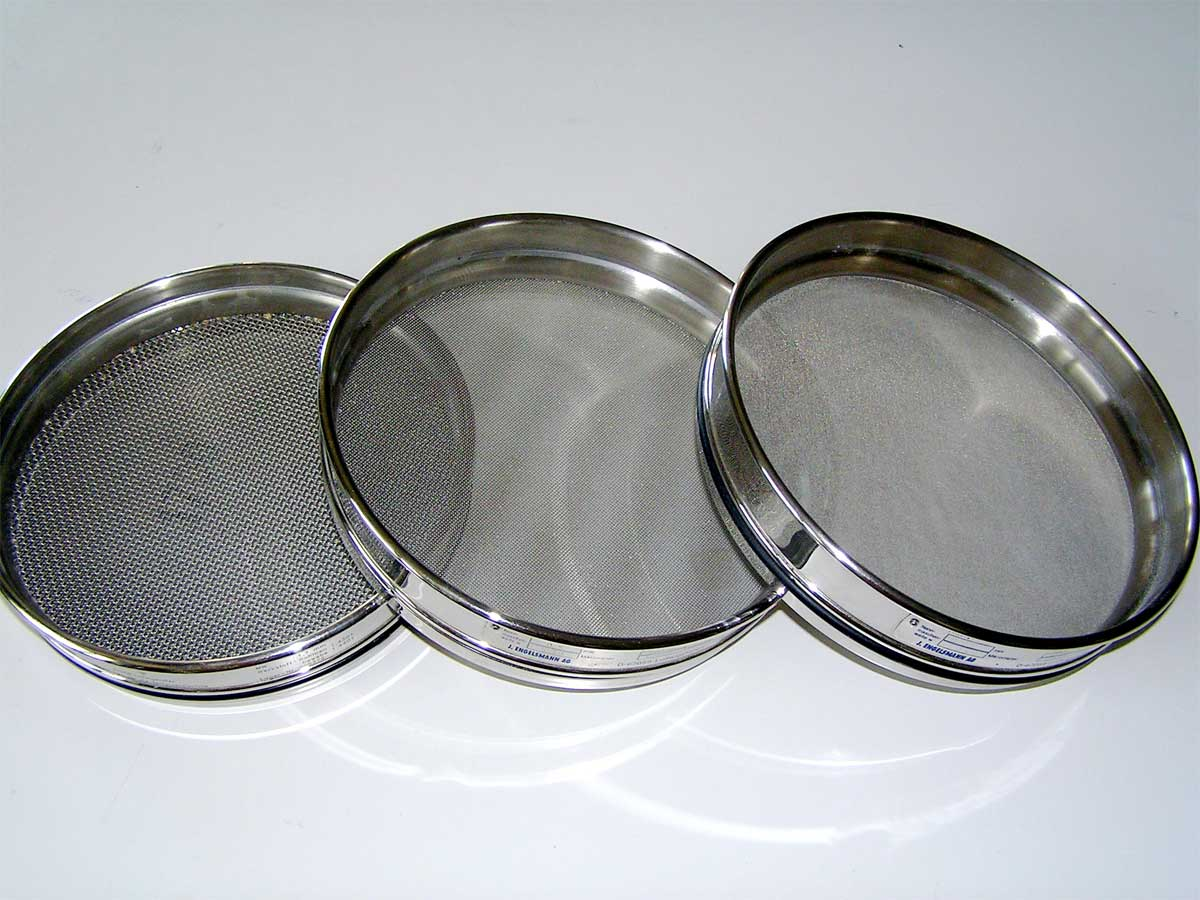
Laboratory sieves

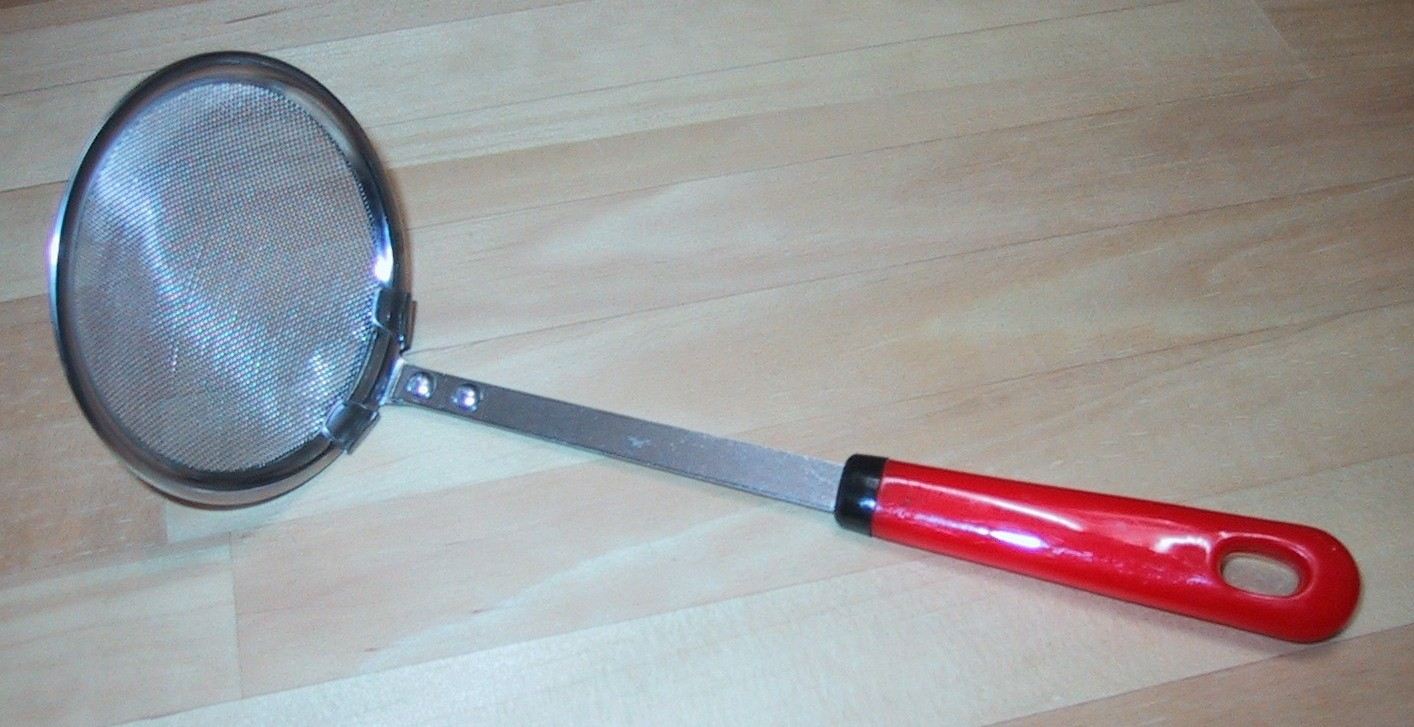
An ami shakushi, a Japanese ladle or scoop that may be used to remove small drops of batter during the frying of tempura

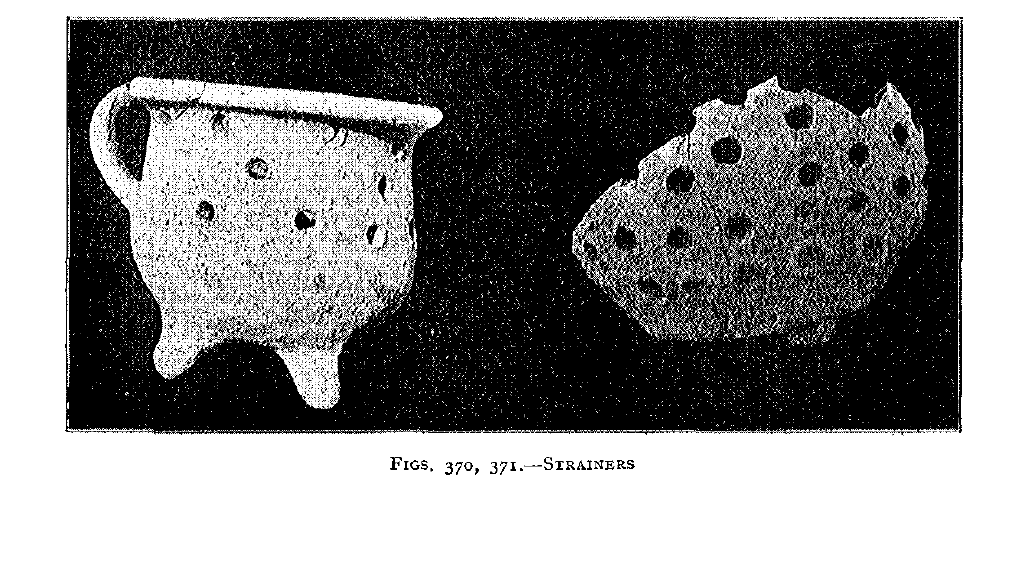
ancient sieve

A sieve (/sɪv/), fine mesh strainer, or sift is a tool used for separating wanted elements from unwanted material or for controlling the particle size distribution of a sample, using a screen such as a woven mesh or net or perforated sheet material. The word sift derives from sieve.

In cooking, a sifter is used to separate and break up clumps in dry ingredients such as flour, as well as to aerate and combine them. A strainer (see colander), meanwhile, is a form of sieve used to separate suspended solids from a liquid by filtration.

== Sieving ==
Sifting flour

Sieving is a simple technique for separating particles of different sizes. A sieve such as used for sifting flour has very small holes. Coarse particles are separated or broken up by grinding against one another and the screen openings. Depending upon the types of particles to be separated, sieves with different types of holes are used. Sieves are also used to separate stones from sand. Sieving plays an important role in food industries where sieves (often vibrating) are used to prevent the contamination of the product by foreign bodies. The design of the industrial sieve is of primary importance here.

== Wooden sieves ==
A wooden mesh in which the withes were one eighth of an inch wide and set the same distance apart. This would be used on an English farm of the Victorian era to sift grain, removing dust and soil.

The mesh in a wooden sieve might be made from wood or wicker. Use of wood to avoid contamination is important when the sieve is used for sampling. Henry Stephens, in his Book of the Farm, advised that the withes of a wooden riddle or sieve be made from fir or willow with American elm being best. The rims would be made of fir, oak or, especially, beech.

== US standard test sieve series ==
A sieve analysis (or gradation test) is a practice or procedure used (commonly used in civil engineering or sedimentology) to assess the particle size distribution (also called gradation) of a granular material. Sieve sizes used in combinations of four to eight sieves.

Designations and Nominal Sieve Openings
Tyler	Nominal	Sieve
Tyler	Nominal	opening
—	5 inch	125 millimetres (4.9 in)
—	4.24 inch	106 millimetres (4.2 in)
—	4 inch	100 millimetres (3.9 in)
—	3 1/2 inch	90 millimetres (3.5 in)
2.97 inch	3.0 inch	75 millimetres (3.0 in)
—	2 1/2 inch	63 millimetres (2.5 in)
—	2.12 inch	53 millimetres (2.1 in)
2.10 inch	2 inch	50 millimetres (2.0 in)
—	1 3/4 inch	45 millimetres (1.8 in)
1.48 inch	1 1/2 inch	37.5 millimetres (1.48 in)
—	1 1/4 inch	31.5 millimetres (1.24 in)
1.05 inch	1.06 inch	26.5 millimetres (1.04 in)
—	1 inch	25.0 millimetres (0.98 in)
0.883 inch	7/8 inch	22.4 millimetres (0.88 in)
0.742 inch	3/4 inch	19.0 millimetres (0.75 in)
0.624 inch	5/8 inch	16.0 millimetres (0.63 in)
0.525 inch	0.530 inch	13.2 millimetres (0.52 in)
—	1/2 inch	12.5 millimetres (0.49 in)
0.441 inch	7/16 inch	11.2 millimetres (0.44 in)
0.371 inch	3/8 inch	9.5 millimetres (0.37 in)

== In culture ==
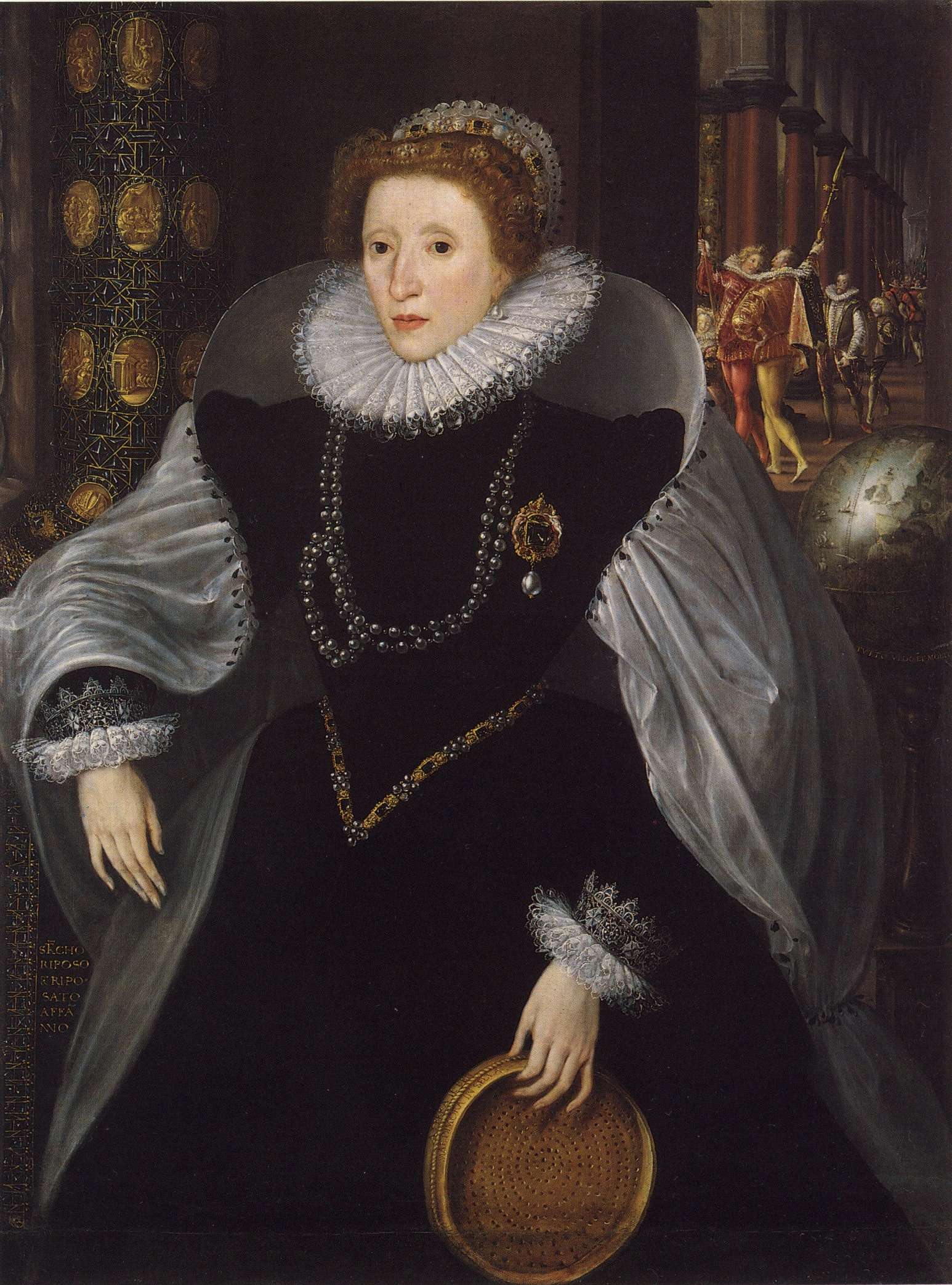
The Metsys portrait of Elizabeth I holding a sieve

In iconography, the sieve was used as a symbol of chastity, in reference to the Latin legend recounting how the vestal virgin Tuccia carried water from the Tiber in a sieve without losing a drop, thus proving her virginity.

At least two portraits of Queen Elizabeth I of England, known as the Virgin Queen, show her holding a sieve in her hand. The earliest was the 1579 portrait by George Gower, showing the 46 year-old queen with a globe as symbol of imperial expansion, and a sieve for her declared virginity. The same symbols appear in a later portrait signed by Quentin Metsys the Younger.

== Other types ==
- Chinois, or conical sieve used as a strainer, also sometimes used like a food mill
- Cocktail strainer, a bar accessory
- Colander, a (typically) bowl-shaped sieve used as a strainer in cooking
- Flour sifter or bolter, used in flour production and baking
- Graduated sieves, used to separate varying small sizes of material, often soil, rock or minerals
- Mesh strainer, or just "strainer", usually consisting of a fine metal mesh screen on a metal frame
  - Laundry strainer, to drain boiling water from laundry removed from a wash copper, usually with a wooden frame to facilitate manual handling with hot contents
- Pickle lifter – Device for lifting pickled goods from a container
- Riddle, used for soil
- Spider, used in Chinese cooking
- Tamis, also known as a drum sieve
- Tea strainer, specifically intended for use when making tea
- Zaru, or bamboo sieve, used in Japanese cooking

Other uses

- "Sieve" is a common term used in trash-talk referring to a goaltender in ice hockey who lets in too many goals
- "Leaks like a sieve" is an English language idiom to describe a container that has multiple leaks, or, by allegory, an organization whose confidential information is routinely disclosed to the public.

== See also ==
- Cheesecloth – Loosely woven carded cotton cloth used primarily in cooking and cheesemaking
- Cloth filter – Method to decontaminate drinking water
- Filtration – Process that separates solids from fluids
- Gold panning – Form of placer mining
- Gyratory equipment – Tool
- Mechanical screening – Separating granulated ore by particle size
- Mesh (scale) – Measurement of particle size
- Molecular sieve – Filter material with homogeneously sized pores in the nanometer range
- Separation process – Method that converts a mixture or solution into two or more distinct products
- Soil gradation – Classification of grainy soils based on the sizes of their grains
- Water filter – Device that removes impurities in water
