= Tamis =

Kitchen utensil used as a strainer

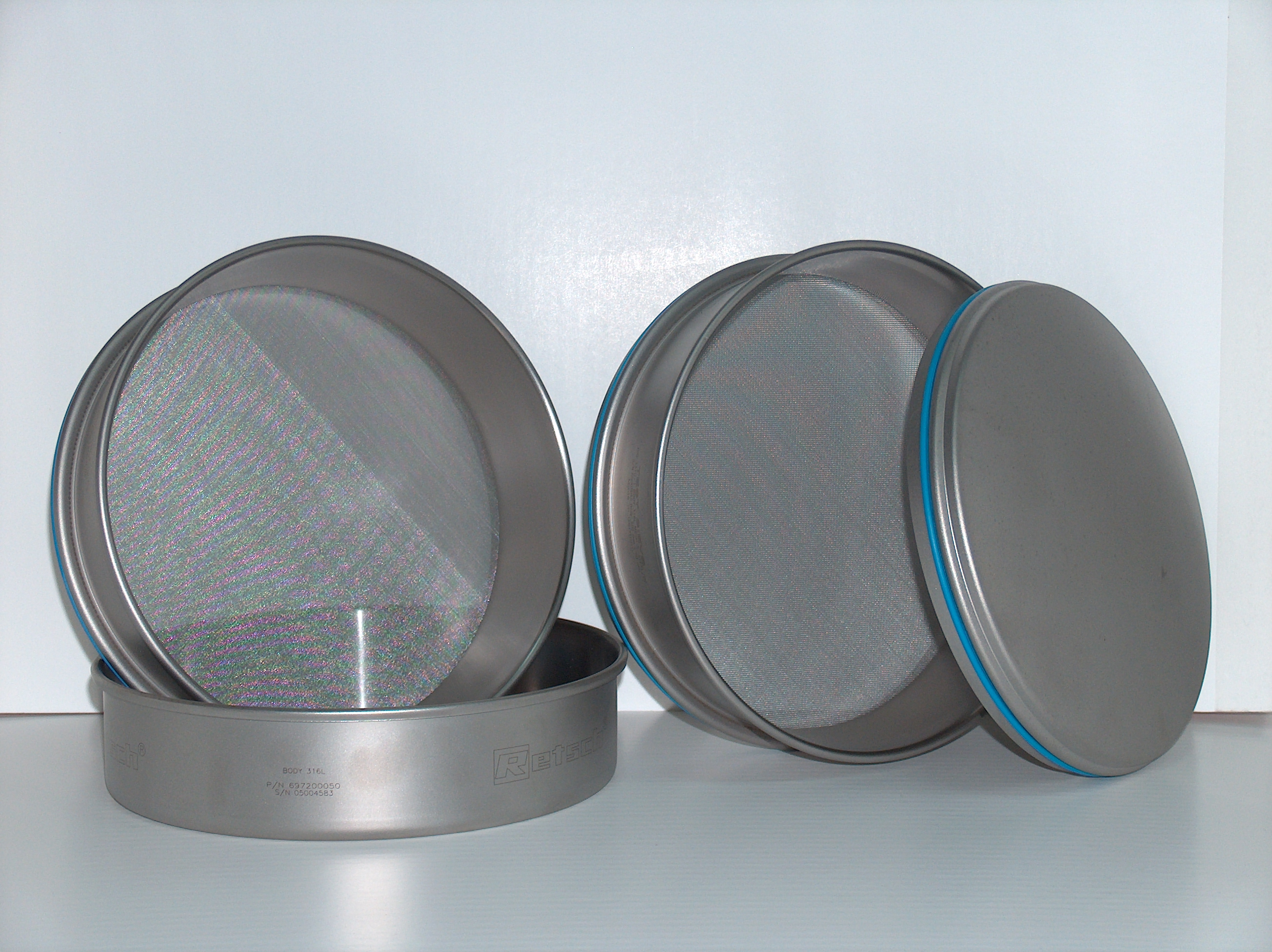
Metal tamises

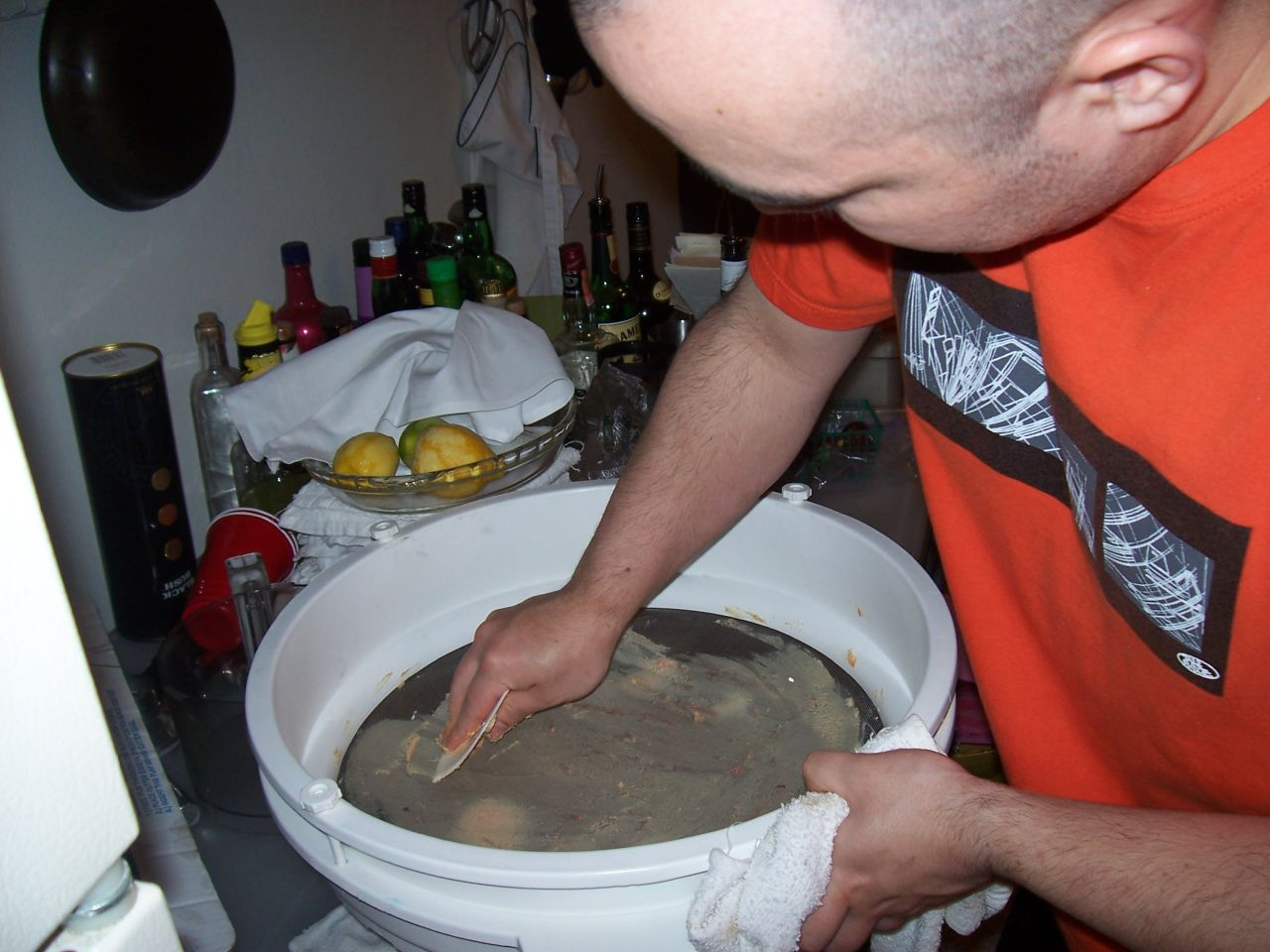
Man using a large commercial tamis, pushing the ingredients through the mesh with a scraper

A tamis (pronounced "tammy", also known as a drum sieve, or chalni in Indian cooking) is a kitchen utensil, shaped somewhat like a snare drum, that acts as a strainer, grater, or food mill. A tamis has a cylindrical edge, made of metal or wood, that supports a disc of fine metal, nylon, or horsehair mesh. To use one, the cook places the tamis above a bowl and adds the ingredient to be strained in the centre of the mesh. The food is then pushed through using a scraper or pestle. Tamises have been in use since the Middle Ages.

Because the tamis' mesh is flat, downward pressure can be applied with little effort simply by scraping with a horizontal motion. A tamis should be used with the inner hoop uppermost, first because it holds more, and second so that the bowl below will rest on the hoop rather than the mesh. Tamises sift and grate ingredients finer than any other utensil, and the texture of the strained material is evenly consistent.

Tamises range in size from 6 to 16 inches (15 to 41 cm) and the mesh is available in different gauges. The nylon mesh is more resilient than wire and keeps its shape better. It is the best (preferably medium-coarse) mesh to use for fruit purées, which are liable to become discoloured and tainted by wire. A wire mesh is sharper and stronger than nylon, but it will rust if not dried carefully after each use. Horsehair mesh tamises were previously common, but are now difficult to find outside of antique stores.

== See also ==
- List of food preparation utensils
- Chinois
- Food mill
