= Tuccia gens =

Ancient Roman family

The gens Tuccia was a minor plebeian family at ancient Rome. Only a few members of this gens are mentioned in history, of whom the most famous may be the Vestal Virgin Tuccia, who performed a miracle in order to prove her innocence.

== Origin ==
The nomen Tuccius is not of Latin derivation, but is believed to be an Oscan name.

== Members ==
- Tuccia, one of the Vestals, was accused of incest, and called upon Vesta to prove her innocence. The goddess gave her the power to carry a sieve filled with water from the Tiber to the Temple of Vesta.
- Marcus Tuccius, curule aedile in 192 BC, and praetor in 190, received Apulia and Bruttium for his province. After his term of office expired, he was named propraetor, remaining in his province for the following two years. In 185, he was one of the commissioners appointed to establish colonies at Sipontum and Buxentum.
- Marcus Tuccius, brought an accusation of vis against Gaius Sempronius Rufus 51 BC; Sempronius then accused him of the same.
- Marcus Tuccius Cerialis, consul suffectus in an unknown year. Pliny the Younger wrote to him, providing a number of tips on delivering a speech.

== See also ==
- List of Roman gentes
- Tuccianus

== Bibliography ==
- Marcus Caelius Rufus, Apud Ciceronis ad Familiares.
- Dionysius of Halicarnassus, Romaike Archaiologia (Roman Antiquities).
- Titus Livius (Livy), History of Rome.
- Valerius Maximus, Factorum ac Dictorum Memorabilium (Memorable Facts and Sayings).
- Gaius Plinius Secundus (Pliny the Elder), Historia Naturalis (Natural History).
- Gaius Plinius Caecilius Secundus (Pliny the Younger), Epistulae (Letters).
- Augustine of Hippo, De Civitate Dei (The City of God).
- Dictionary of Greek and Roman Biography and Mythology, William Smith, ed., Little, Brown and Company, Boston (1849).
- George Davis Chase, "The Origin of Roman Praenomina", in Harvard Studies in Classical Philology, vol. VIII, pp. 103–184 (1897).
