= Colander =

Bowl-shaped kitchen utensil with holes in it used for draining food

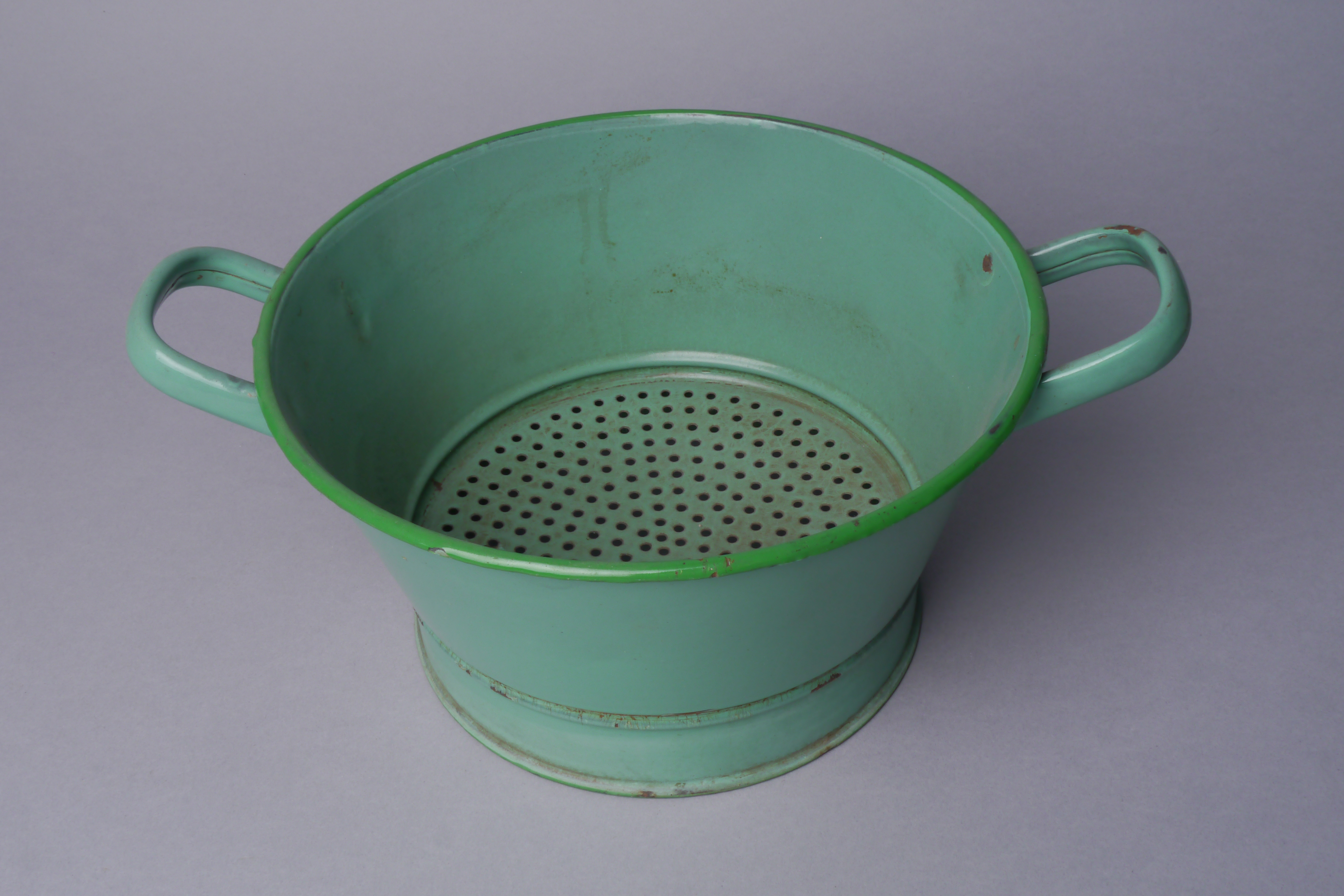
Enamelled colander (collection Museum of Industry Ghent)

A colander or cullender is a kitchen utensil perforated with holes used to strain foods such as pasta or to rinse vegetables. The perforations of the colander allow liquid to drain through while retaining the solids inside. It is sometimes called a pasta strainer. A sieve, with much finer mesh, is also used for straining.

== Description and history ==
Traditionally, colanders are made of a light metal, such as aluminium or thinly rolled stainless steel. Colanders are also made of plastic, silicone, ceramic, and enamelware.

The word colander comes from the Latin colum, meaning sieve.

== Types ==
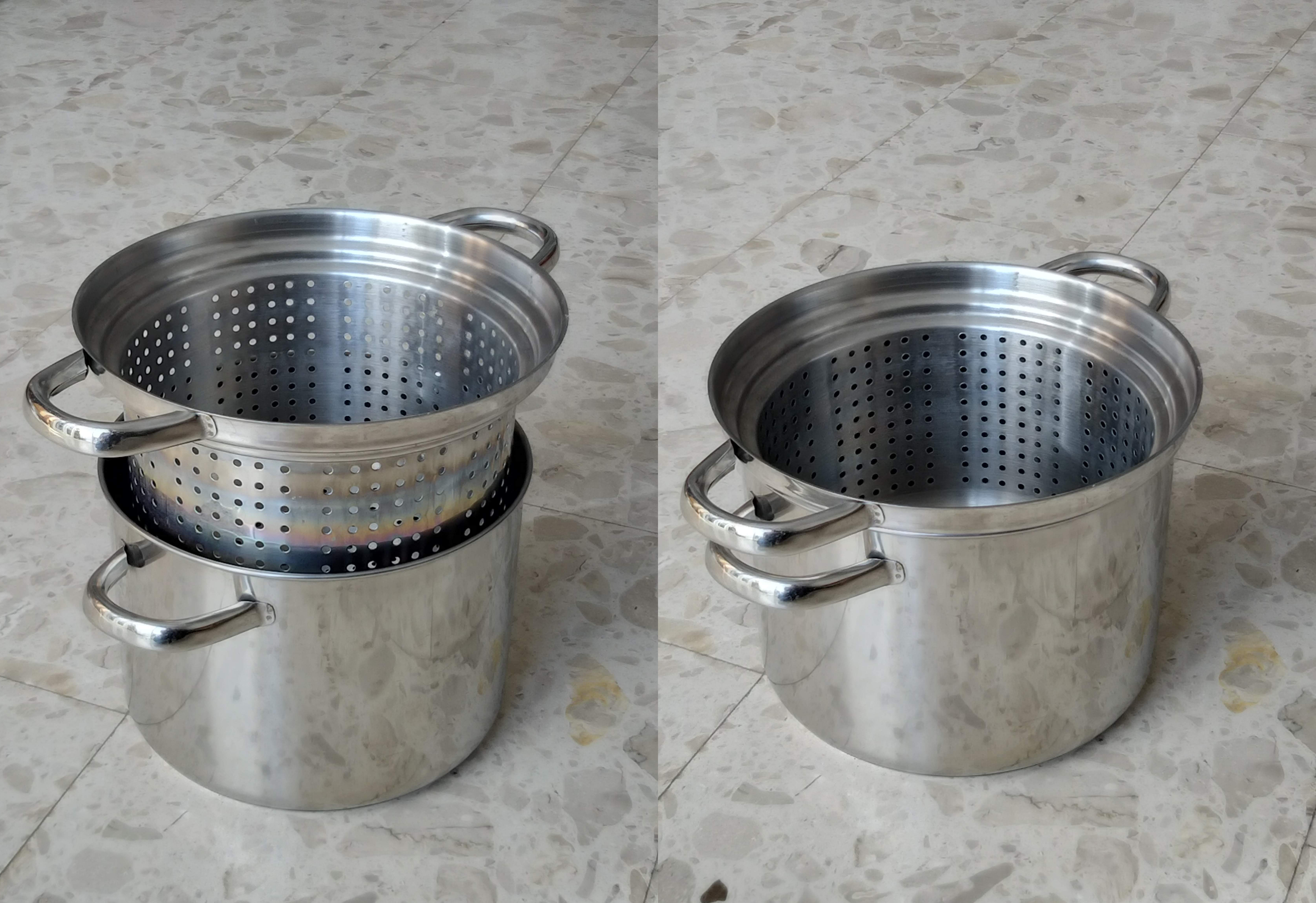
A mated colander pot showing the colander fully inserted into the bottom pot, and slightly lifted out of it

- Bowl- or cone-shaped – the usual colander
- Mated colander pot – a colander inside a cooking pot, allowing the food to drain as it is lifted out

== Society and culture ==
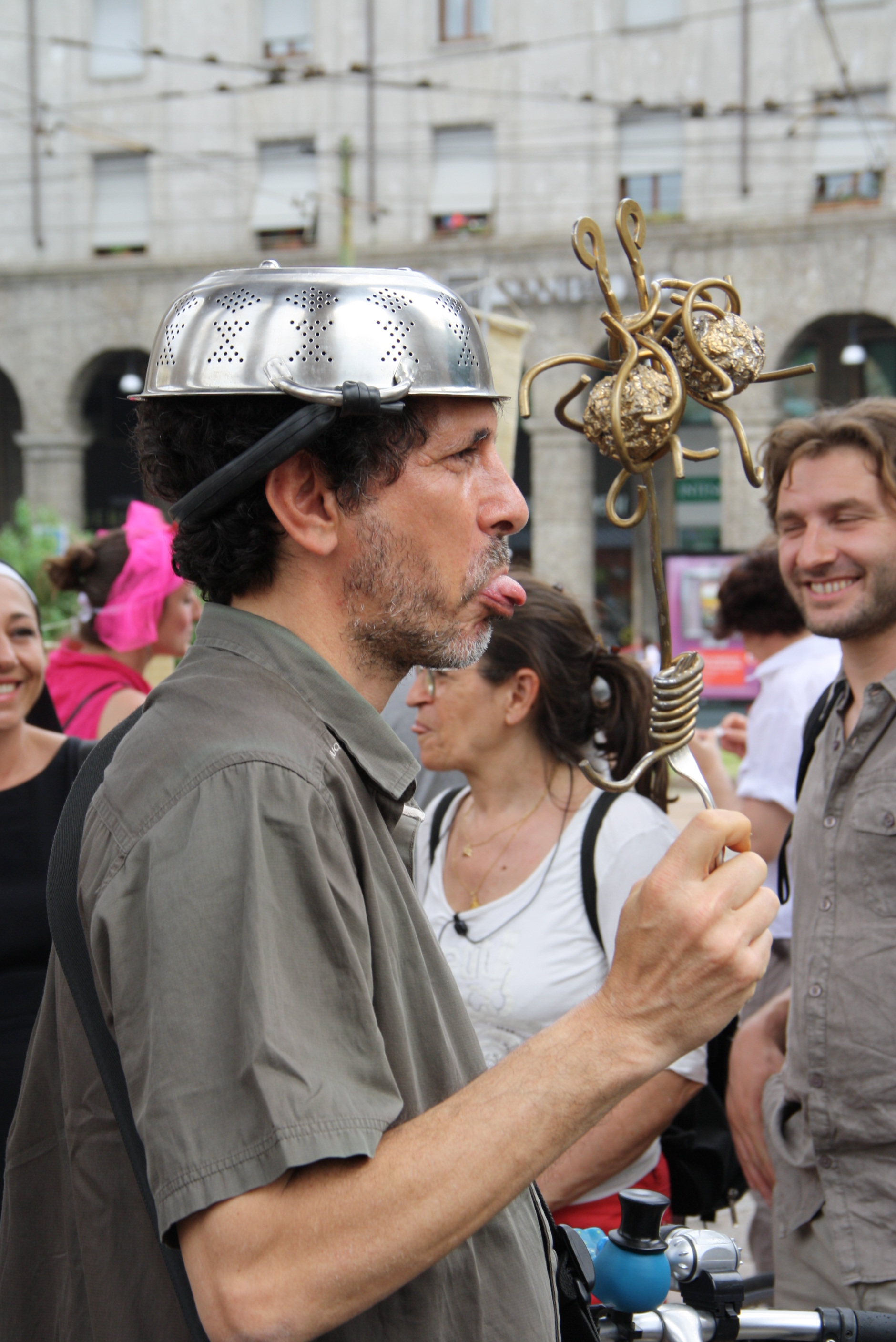
Pastafarian wearing a colander

Colanders are the traditional headgear of the satirical religion Pastafarianism, with some claiming the right to wear them in driver's license and passport photos for religious reasons.

== See also ==
- Chinois
- Zaru
