= Blueberry sauce =

Compote or savory sauce made with blueberries

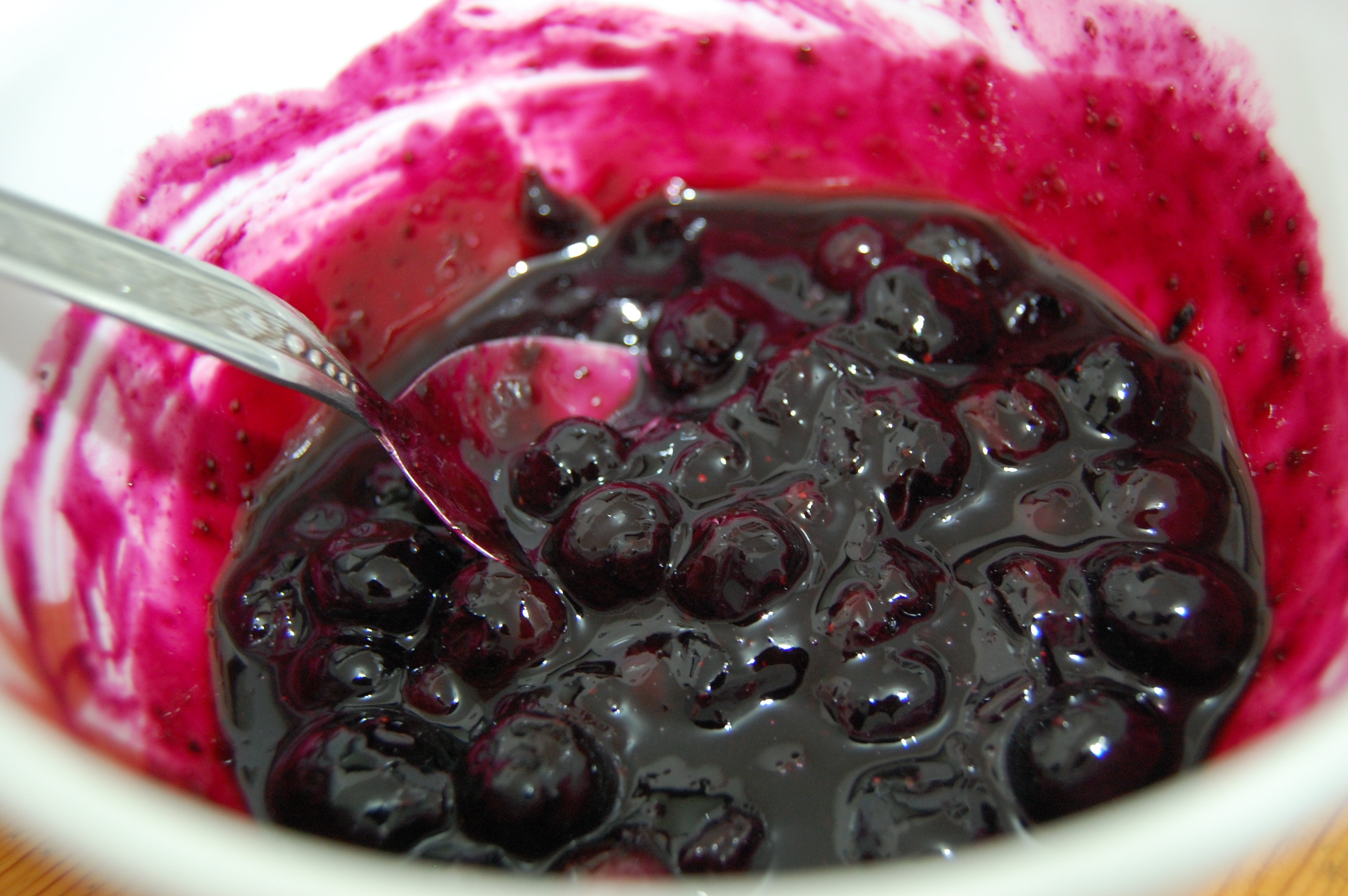
Blueberry compote, prepared as a cheesecake topping

Blueberry sauce is a sauce prepared using blueberries as a primary ingredient. It is typically prepared as a reduction, and can be used as a dessert sauce or savory sauce depending on the preparation. It can also be used in the preparation of the blueberry Martini.

== Preparation ==
Fresh or frozen blueberries, and sometimes wild blueberries are used. The sauce may be prepared to have a smooth or chunky texture. Straining the sauce using a sieve to remove particulate matter creates a smooth texture. It can be preserved by freezing for later use. There are sweet and savory versions of the sauce.

=== Savory ===
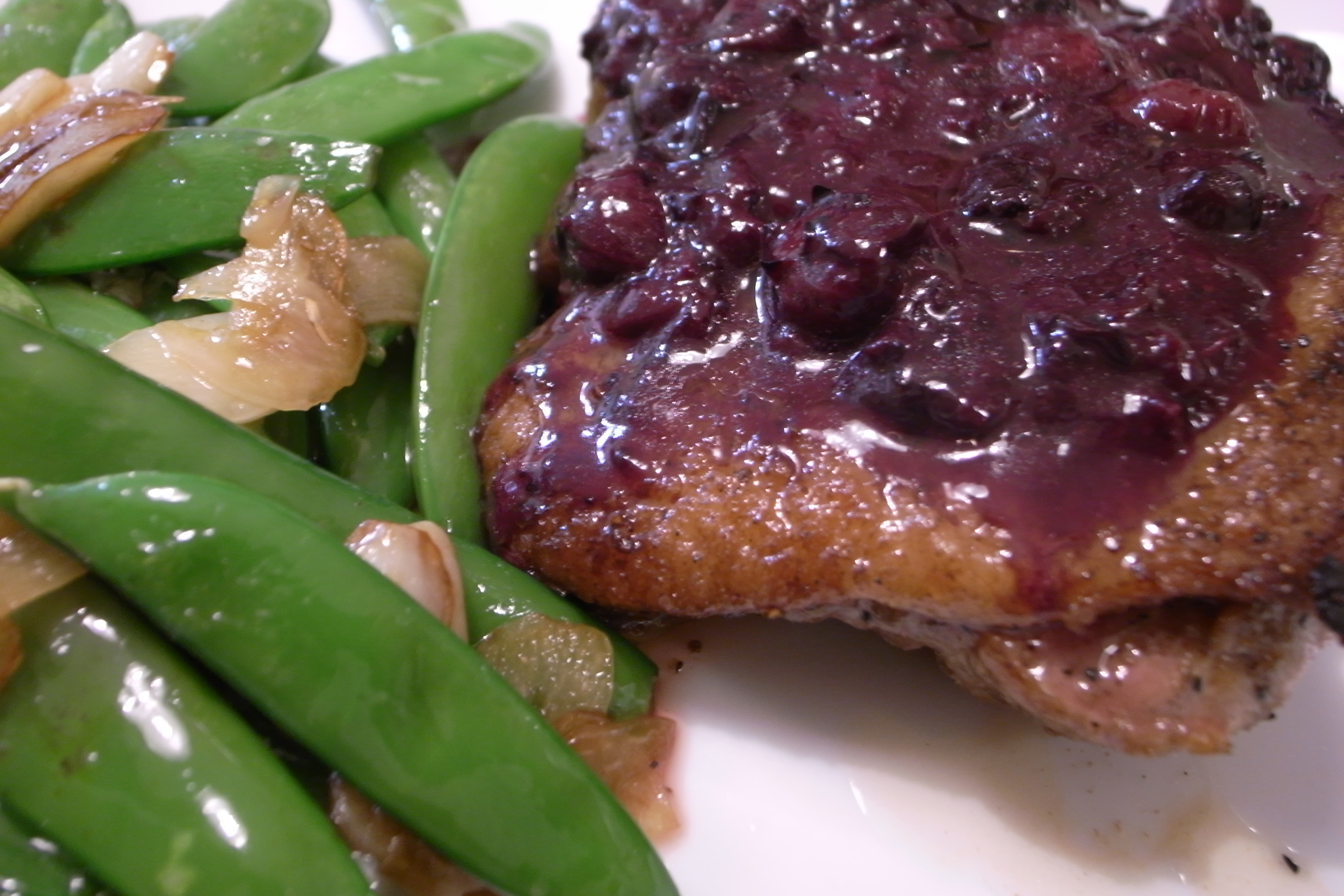
Roast duck with a savory blueberry sauce

Savory blueberry sauces can be prepared without a sweetener, or with a small amount of sweetener, and additional ingredients used can include cider vinegar, chicken broth, lemon juice, salt, pepper and corn starch. The sauce is used to top various savory dishes such as roasted pork, chicken, lamb and duck. It is sometimes served on the side, rather than atop dishes.

=== Sweet ===
Sweet blueberry sauce, also called blueberry compote, may be used as a dessert sauce. Blueberries and water provide the base for the sauce, but beyond that recipes vary. A sweetener such as sugar is typically used, and lemon juice, orange juice, butter and corn starch are sometimes added. A spiced version can be made using cloves, cinnamon and cardamom. Sweet blueberry sauce can be used in or to top desserts such as cheesecake, cake, and ice cream, and on breakfast dishes such as pancakes, waffles and French toast. It can also be used to create a blueberry fool.

== Other uses ==
Blueberry sauce can be used in the preparation of the blueberry Martini cocktail.

== Gallery ==
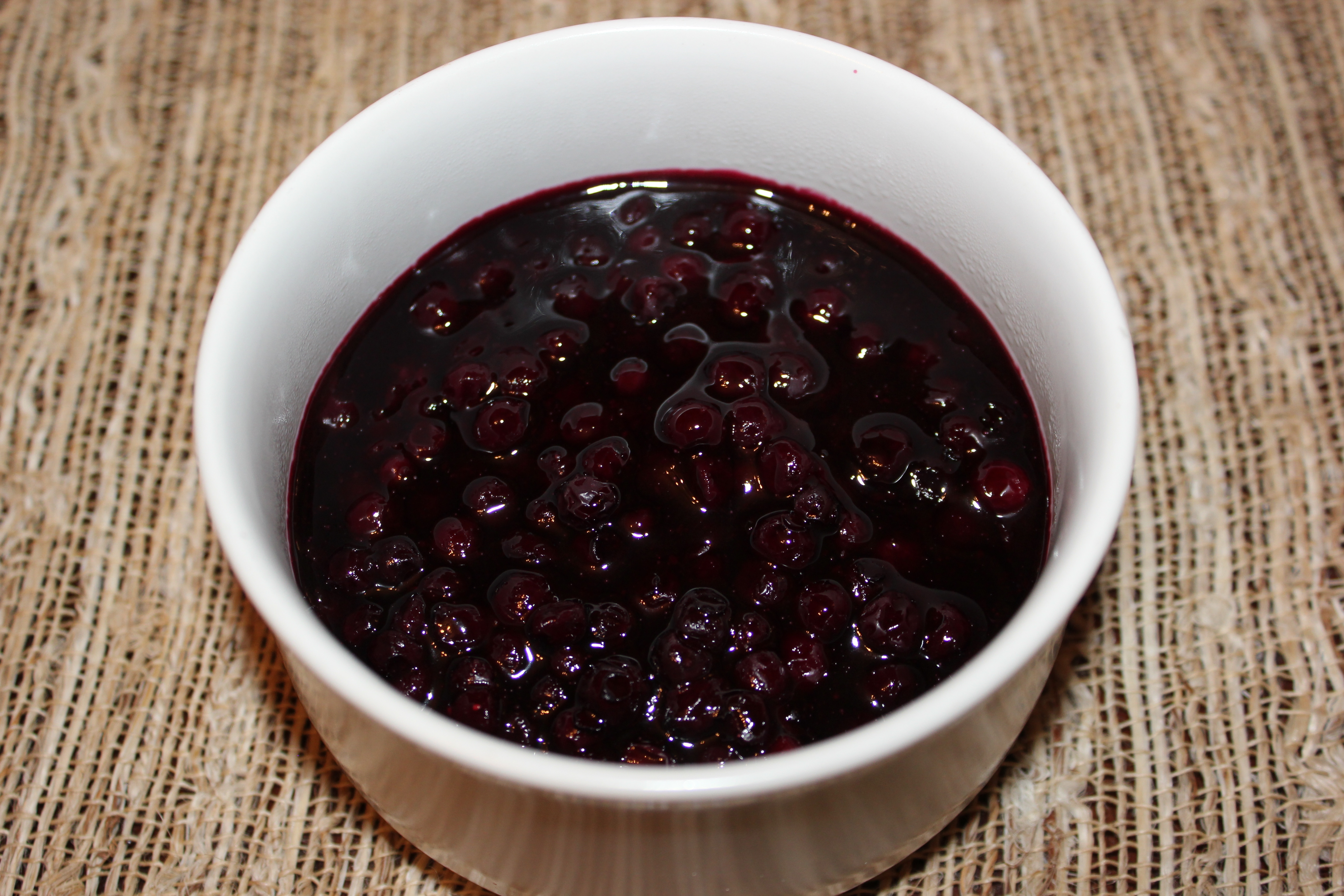
A wild blueberry sauce prepared using whole blueberries

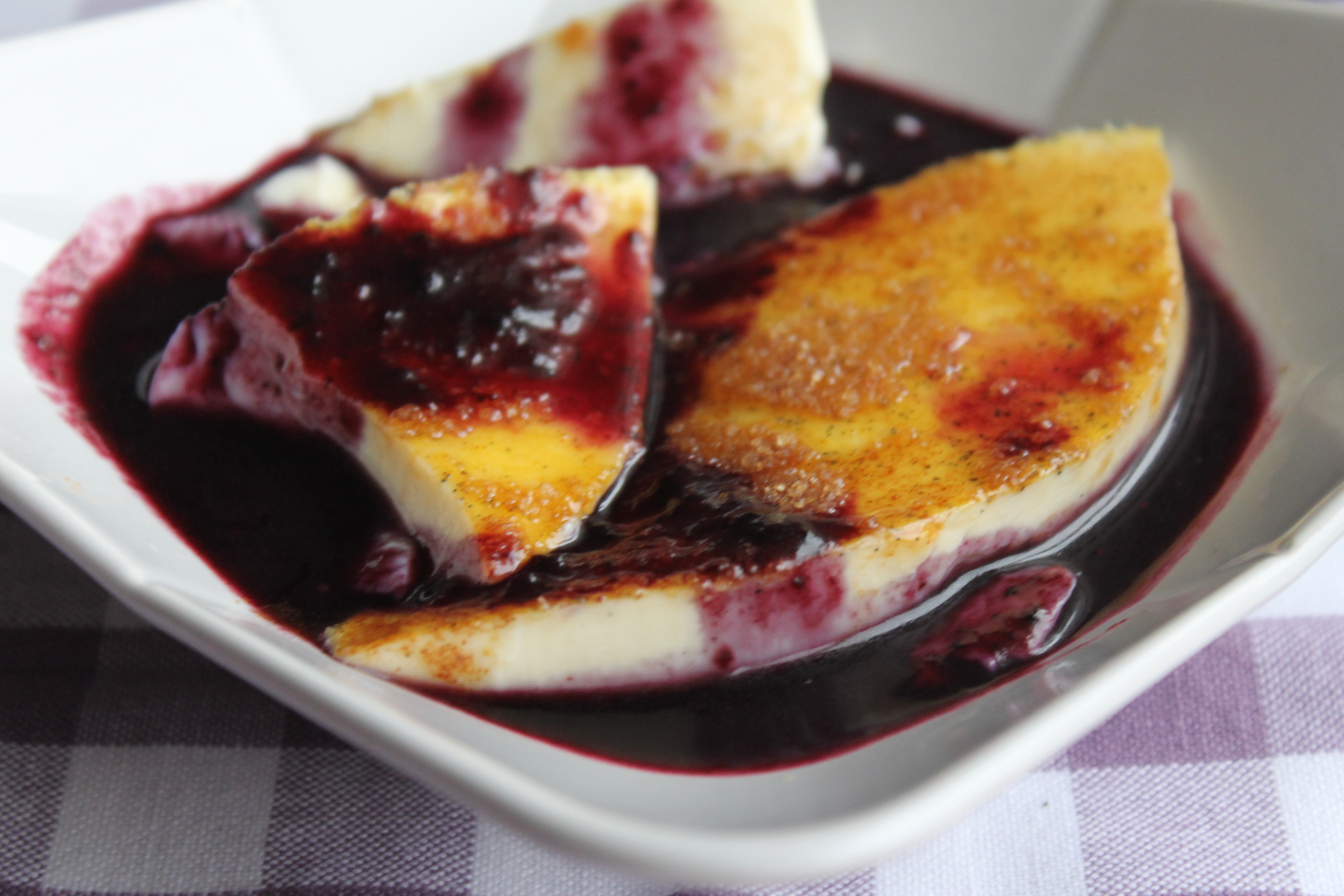
Colostrum pudding, an Icelandic dessert, with cinnamon sugar and a puréed blueberry sauce

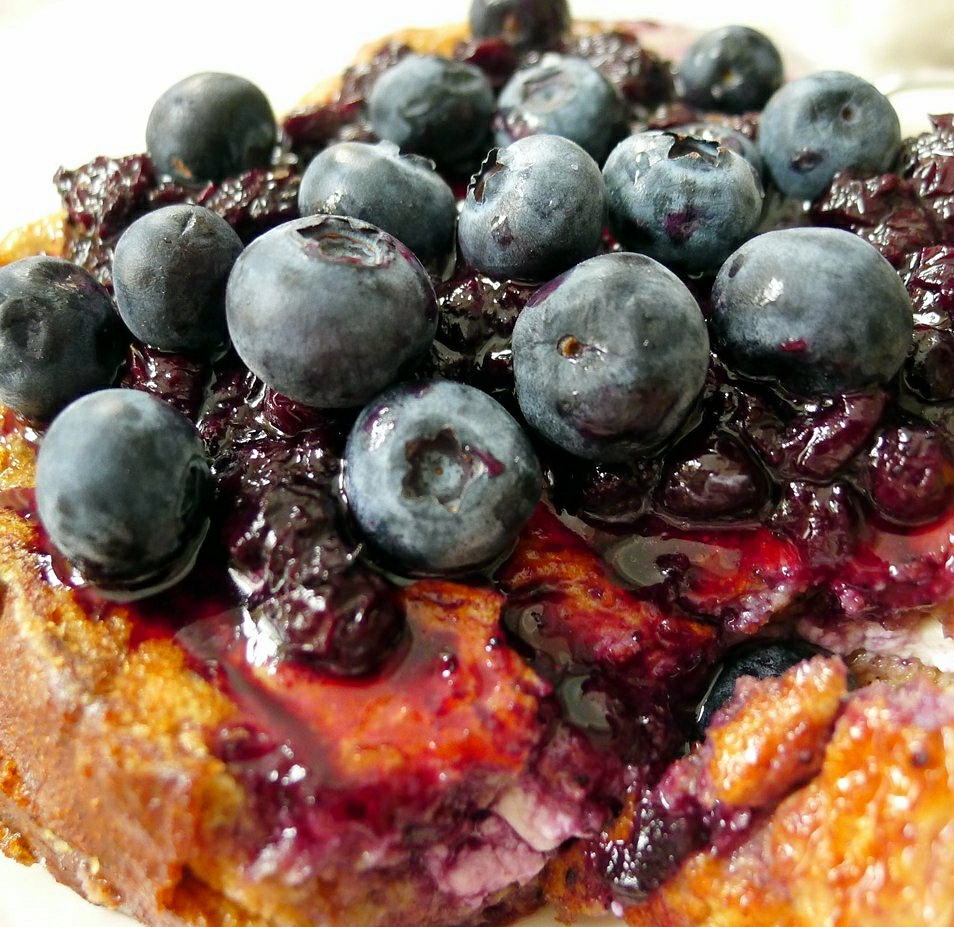
Blueberry-stuffed French toast, topped with wild Maine blueberry sauce and whole blueberries

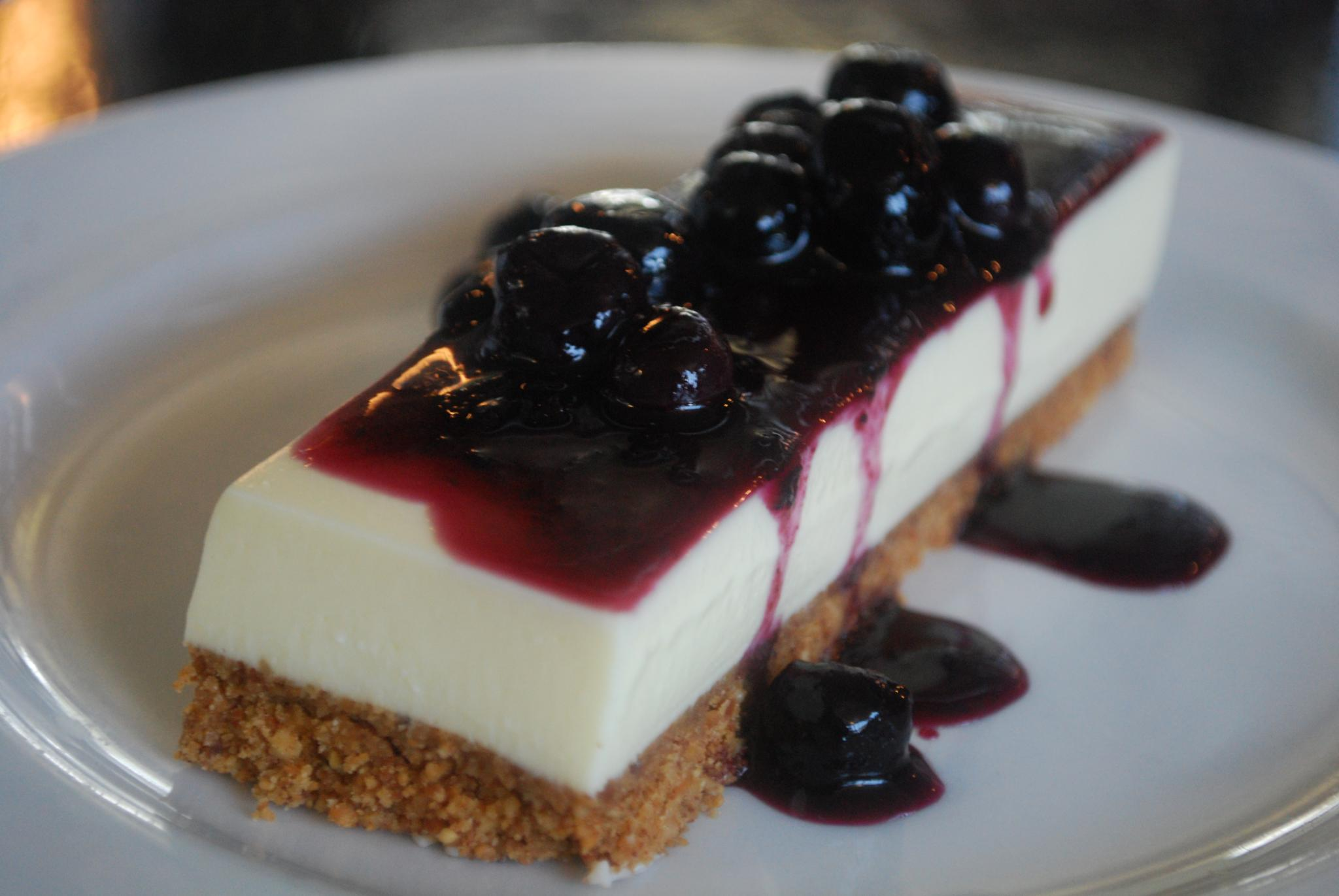
Cheesecake topped with a blueberry sauce

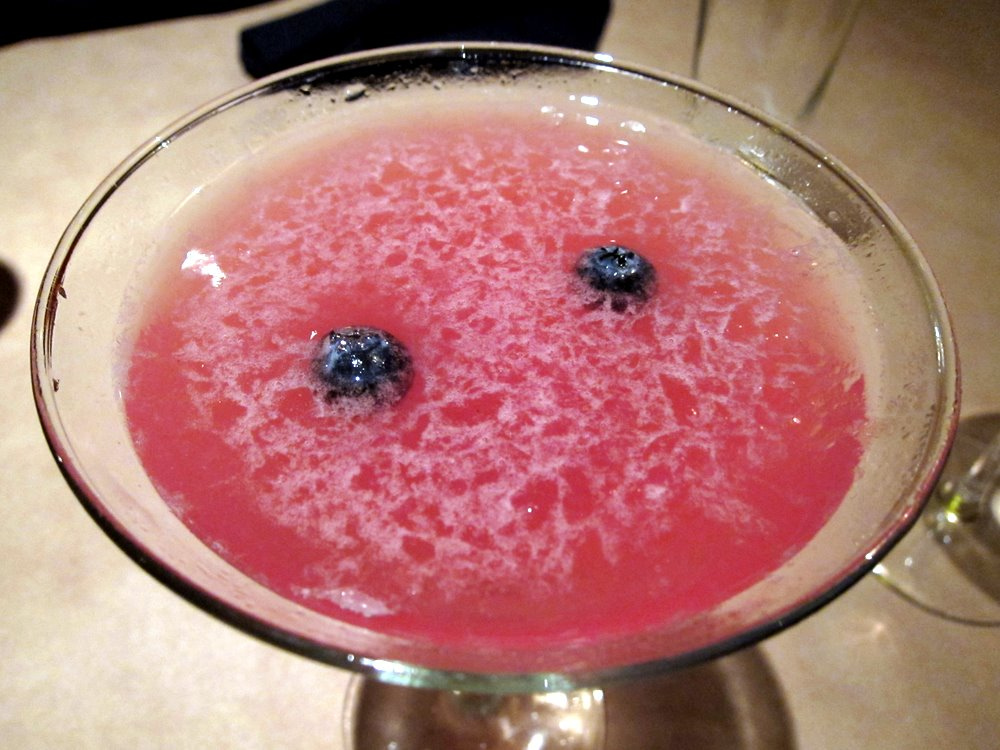
A blueberry Martini

== See also ==
- List of dessert sauces
- List of sauces
