= Rainbow sauce =

Type of culinary sauce

- Type: Sauce
- Course: Dessert, savory, condiment
- Serving temperature: Hot or cold
- Main ingredients: Varies by type; may include pineapple, candied cherries, apricot, citron, pears, pistachio, fruit cocktail, vinegar, soy sauce, cream, white wine, shallots, oranges
- Variations: Dessert sauce, sweet and sour sauce, savory sauce for fish

Rainbow sauce refers to several types of culinary sauces. The term also refers to a food presentation or preparation style in which several sauces are placed on a food dish or plate alongside one-another, and also a sauce preparation method in which several sauces are mixed together.

== Rainbow sauces ==
Rainbow sauce is a dessert sauce prepared with pineapple, candied cherries, apricot, citron, pears, and pistachio nuts. The ingredients are chopped, combined, and boiled in simple syrup to create a sauce. This sauce is typically served atop of an ice cream.

The term also refers to sweet and sour sauce that may utilize many types of ingredients that are combined and heated to create a sauce. Myriad ingredients in its preparation can include green pepper, canned fruit cocktail, corn starch, vinegar, pineapple, pickled and sweet ginger, pickled cucumber, carrot, maraschino cherries, sugar, brown sugar, Worcestershire sauce, soy sauce, lemon juice, cranberry juice, and others. This type of sauce may be served on chicken dishes, among others.

Another version is a savory sauce prepared with ingredients such as cream, white wine, shallots, and oranges. This sauce may be served with fillets of rainbow trout, among other foods.

== See also ==
- List of dessert sauces
- List of sauces
