= Strawberry sauce =

Dessert sauce

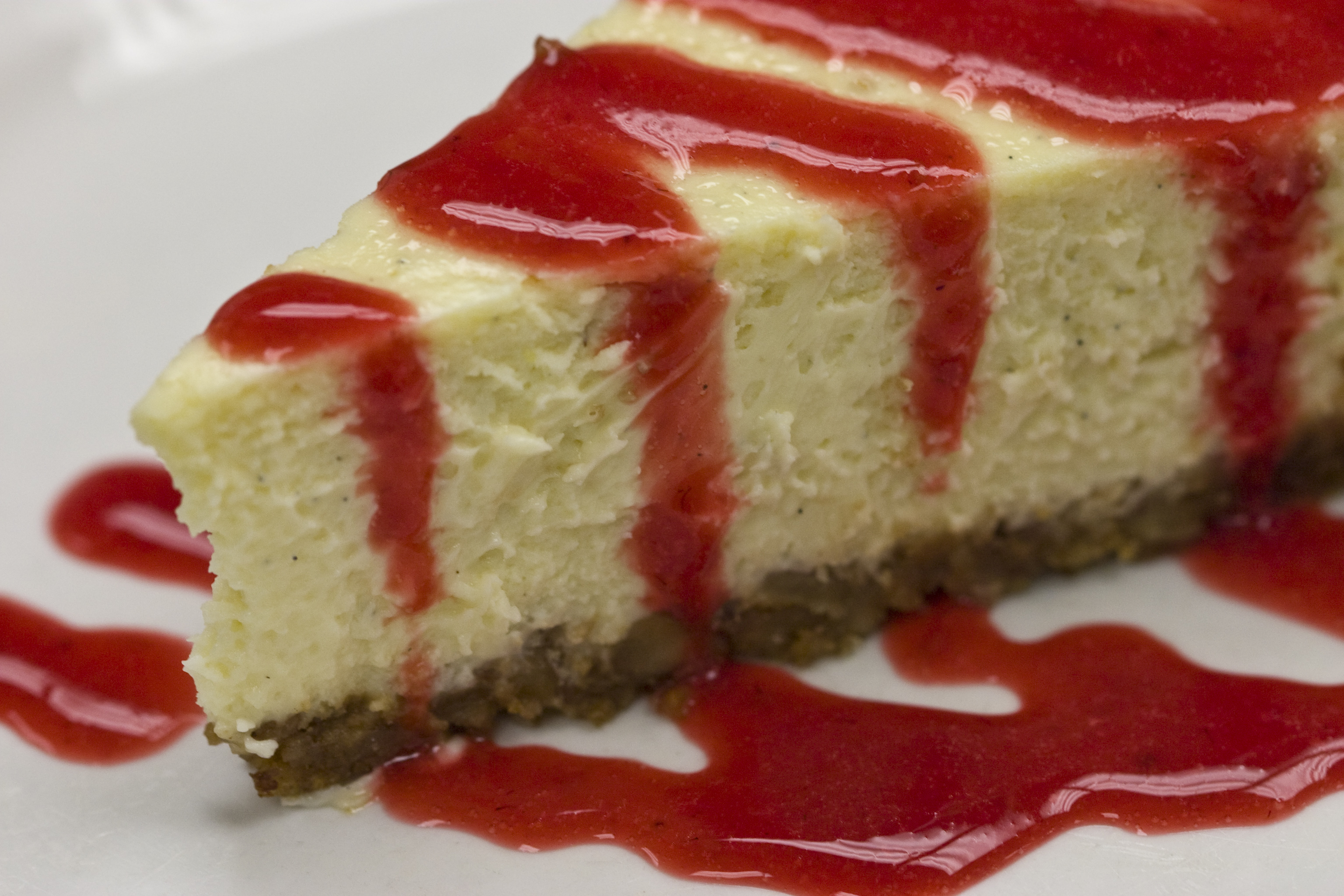
Cheesecake with strawberry sauce

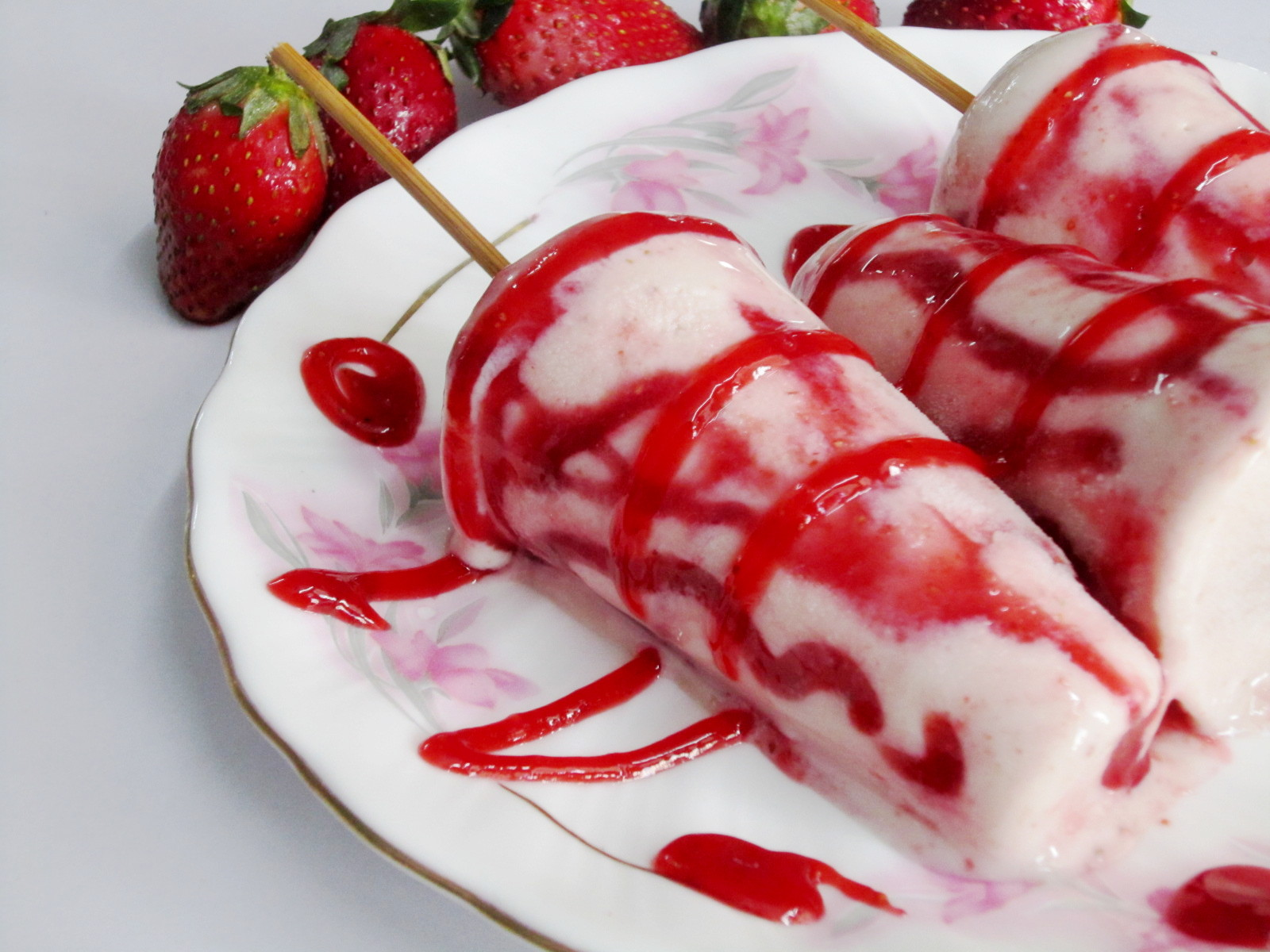
Kulfi with strawberry sauce

Strawberry sauce is a culinary sauce and coulis prepared using strawberries as the main ingredient. It is typically used as a dessert sauce, although it can also be used on savory dishes. Simple versions can be prepared using blended, macerated, or crushed strawberries and sugar, along with some cornstarch as a thickener. This simple mixture can be cooked to marry the ingredient flavors and to enable the cornstarch to thicken if used. Lemon juice is also sometimes used as an ingredient. Fresh or frozen strawberries can be used in its preparation.

Strawberry syrup is a type of strawberry sauce. It is a mass-produced food product that is packed into plastic containers and bottles and provided to consumers, businesses, and food manufacturers. The syrup is used in the manufacturing of strawberry sodas.

== Uses ==
Strawberry sauce is used as a dessert sauce on foods such as cheesecake, ice cream, sundaes, and cakes.

== See also ==
- List of dessert sauces
- List of sauces
- Outline of strawberries
