= Hard sauce =

Dessert sauce of sugar, butter, and spirits

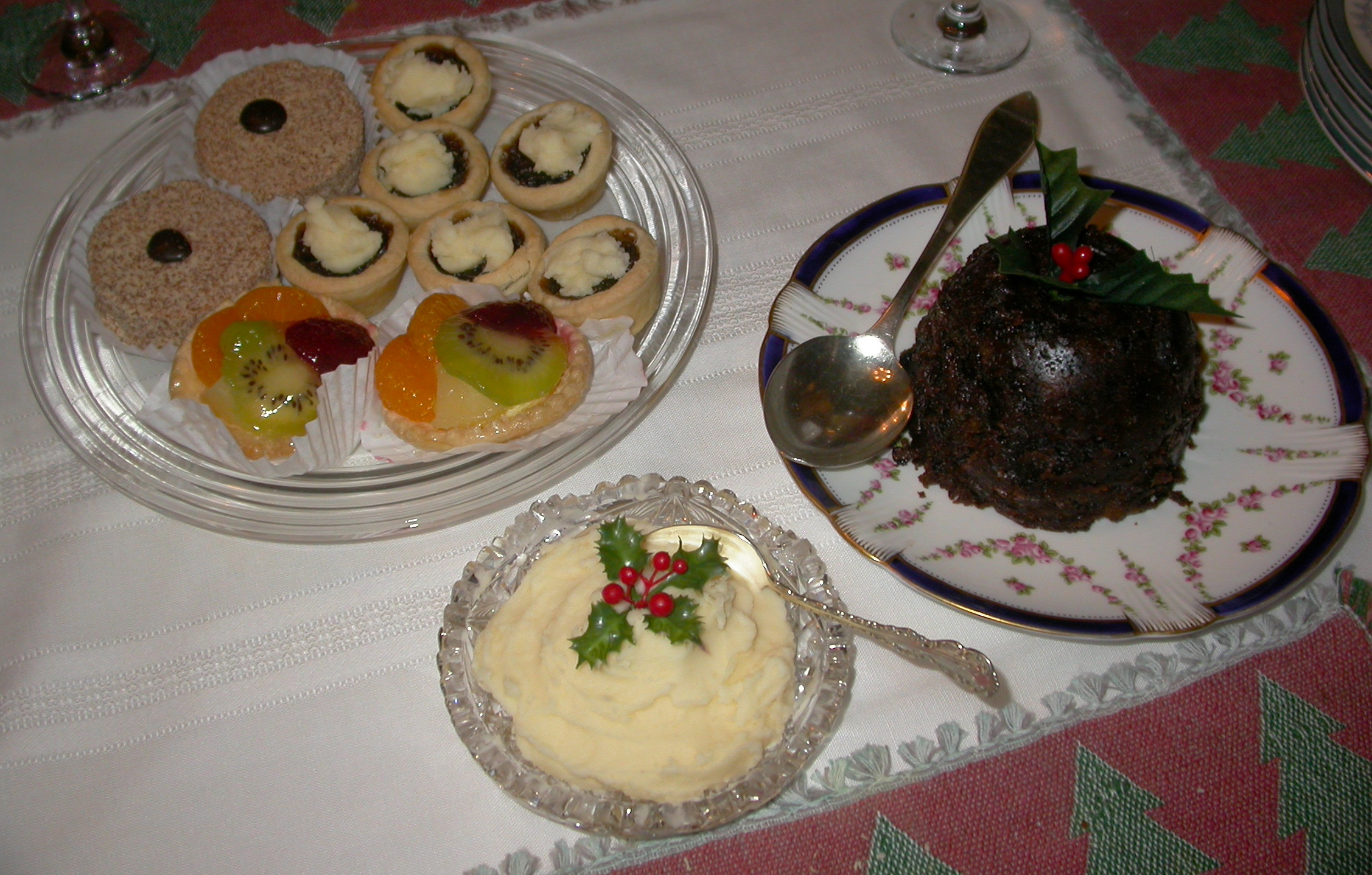
- Christmas dessert including hard sauce (lower center) for pudding (and on tarts at upper left)
- Type: Sauce
- Course: Dessert
- Place of origin: England
- Serving temperature: Cold
- Main ingredients: Butter, sugar, flavouring (rum, brandy, whiskey, sherry, vanilla or other)

Hard sauce (chiefly US) is a sweet, rich dessert sauce made by creaming or beating butter and sugar with rum (rum butter), brandy (brandy butter), whiskey, sherry (sherry butter), vanilla or other flavourings. It is served cold, often with hot desserts.

It is typically served with plum pudding, bread pudding, Indian pudding, hasty pudding, and other heavy puddings as well as with fruitcakes and gingerbread.

In the United Kingdom, brandy butter and rum butter are particularly associated with the Christmas and New Year season and Christmas pudding and warm mince pies, serving as a seasonal alternative to cream, ice cream or custard. At Cambridge, it is also known as Senior Wrangler sauce.

Rum butter specifically is typically found in Cumbria and is not common in other regions of the UK, while brandy butter is found nationwide and is a more commonplace Christmas accompaniment.

Though it is called a sauce, it is neither liquid nor smooth, with a consistency more akin to whipped butter. It is easy to make and keeps for months under refrigeration. It can be pressed into a decorative mold before chilling.

Under European Community regulations, to be called rum/brandy/sherry butter, it must contain at least 20% butterfat.

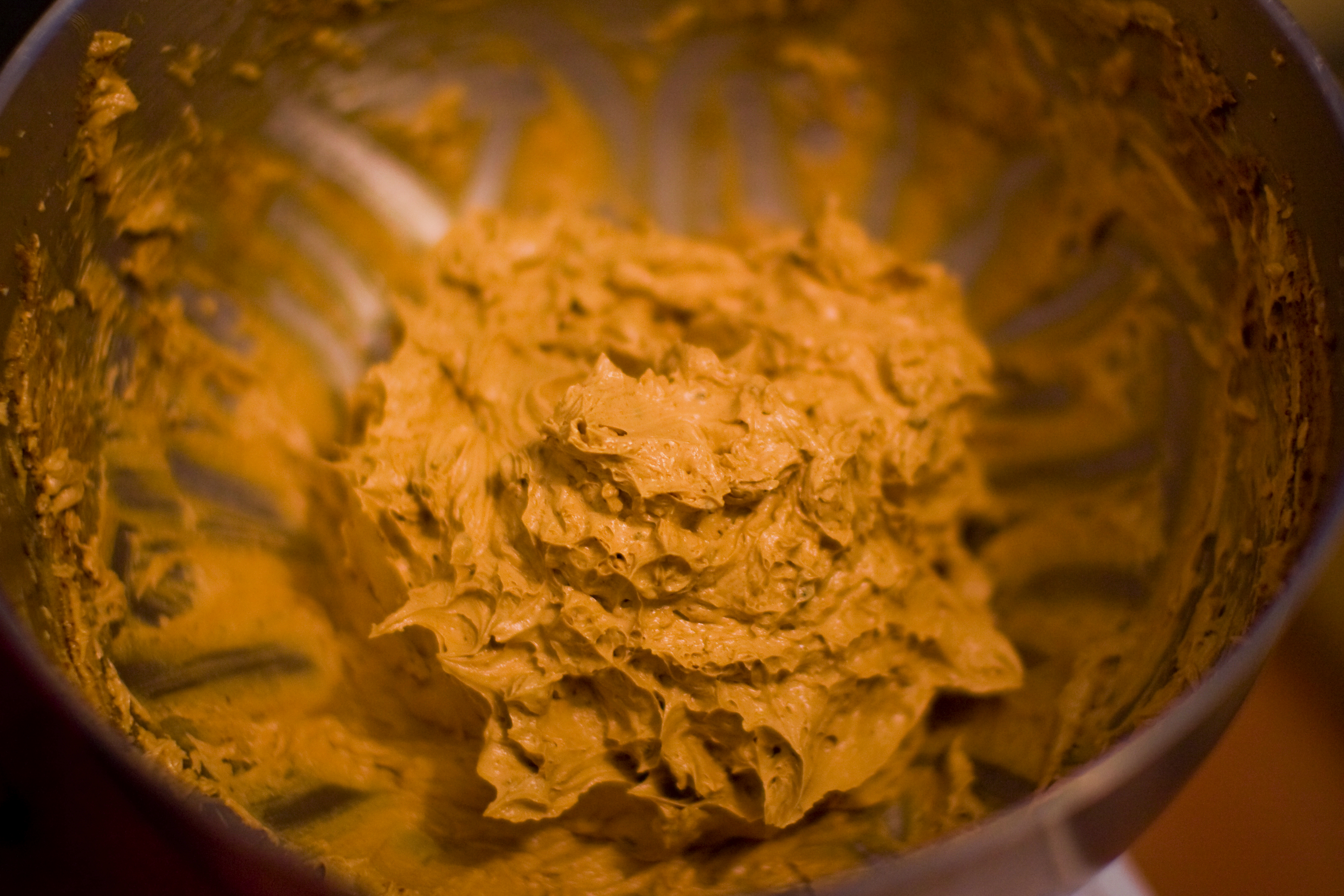
Brandy butter

== See also ==
- List of dessert sauces
