= Wet walnuts =

Dessert topping

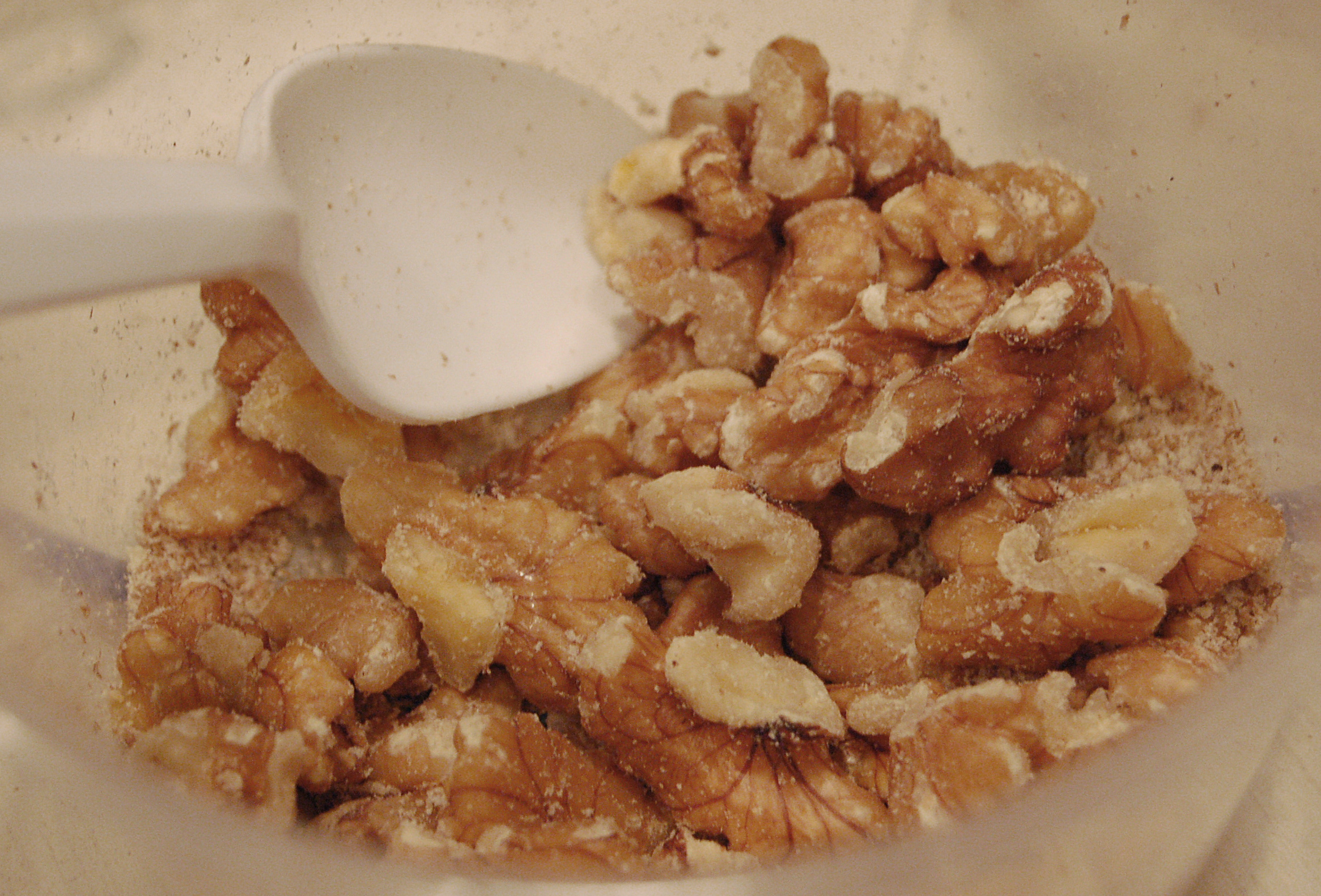
- Shelled walnuts
- Alternative names: Walnut topping
- Type: Dessert topping
- Main ingredients: Walnuts, maple syrup or simple syrup

Wet walnuts or just walnut topping is a dessert topping made from walnuts and maple syrup. Sometimes simple syrup, corn syrup, sugar or brown rice syrup is used instead of (or in combination with) the maple syrup. Wet walnut topping is similar in some respects to pralines, except that the walnuts are always served in syrup, rather than as individual pieces. Some commercial preparations of premade wet walnuts exist.

Wet walnuts are most commonly served with ice cream and as a sundae topping. They are often available as an ice cream topping at ice cream parlors in the United States.

Wet walnuts (United Kingdom) also refers to fresh walnuts which have not been dried for keeping. They are also called green walnuts. Fresh (wet) walnuts have been stated to pair well with some hard cheeses such as pecorino and Parmesan. Some foods are prepared using wet walnuts as a primary ingredient, such as mhammara dip.

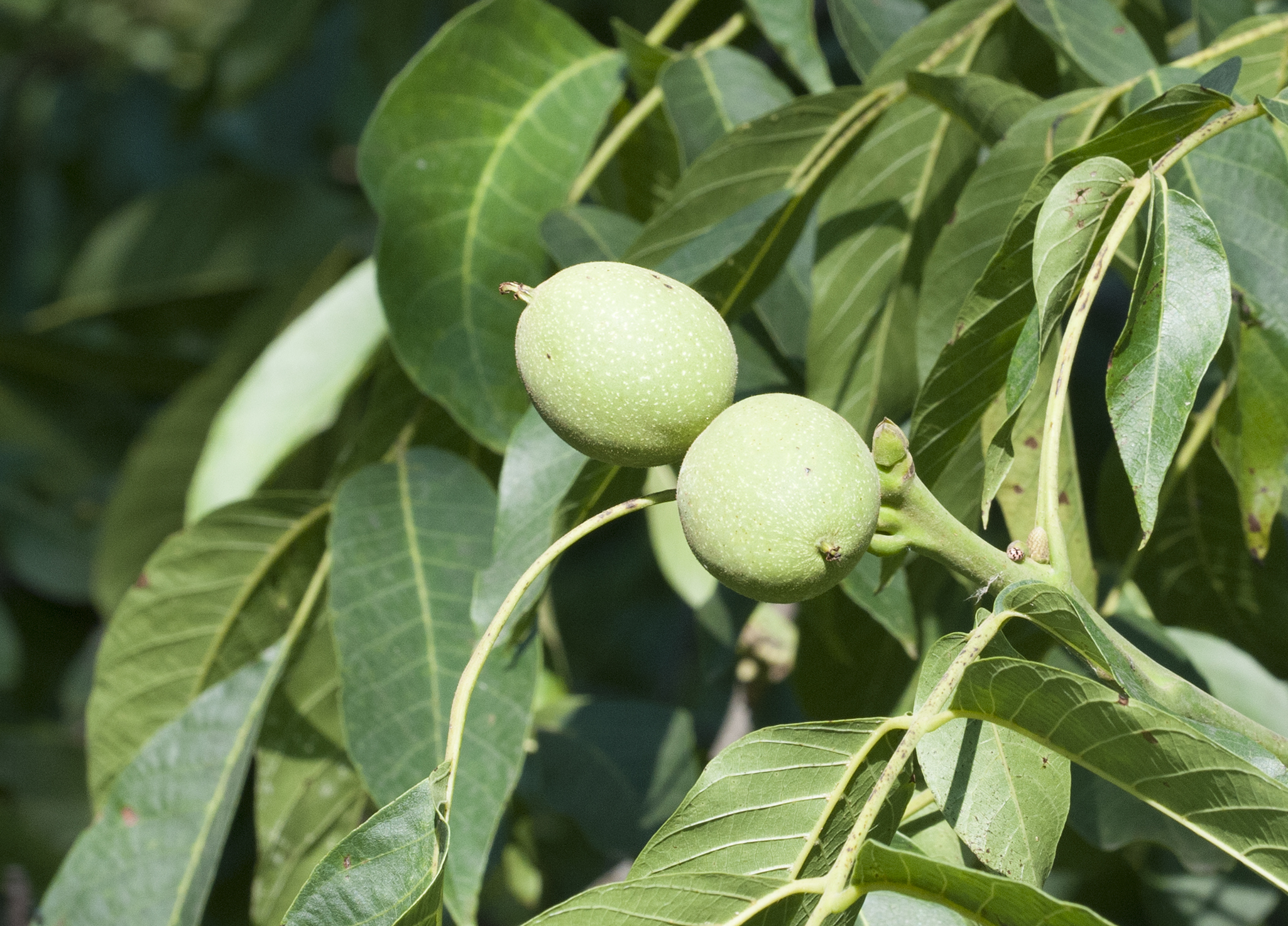
Raw green walnuts.

== See also ==
- List of dessert sauces
