= List of dessert sauces =

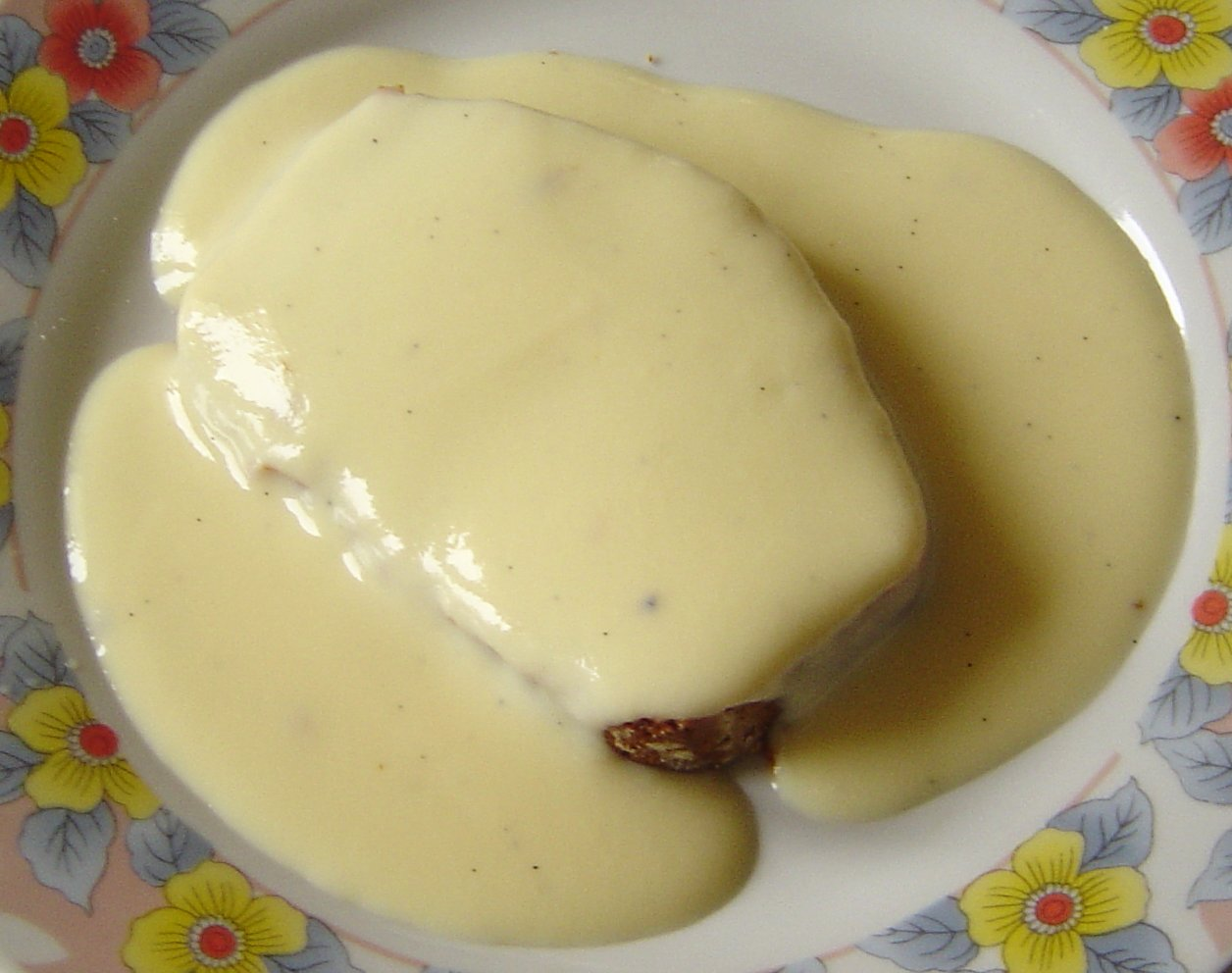
Crème anglaise over a slice of pain d'épices

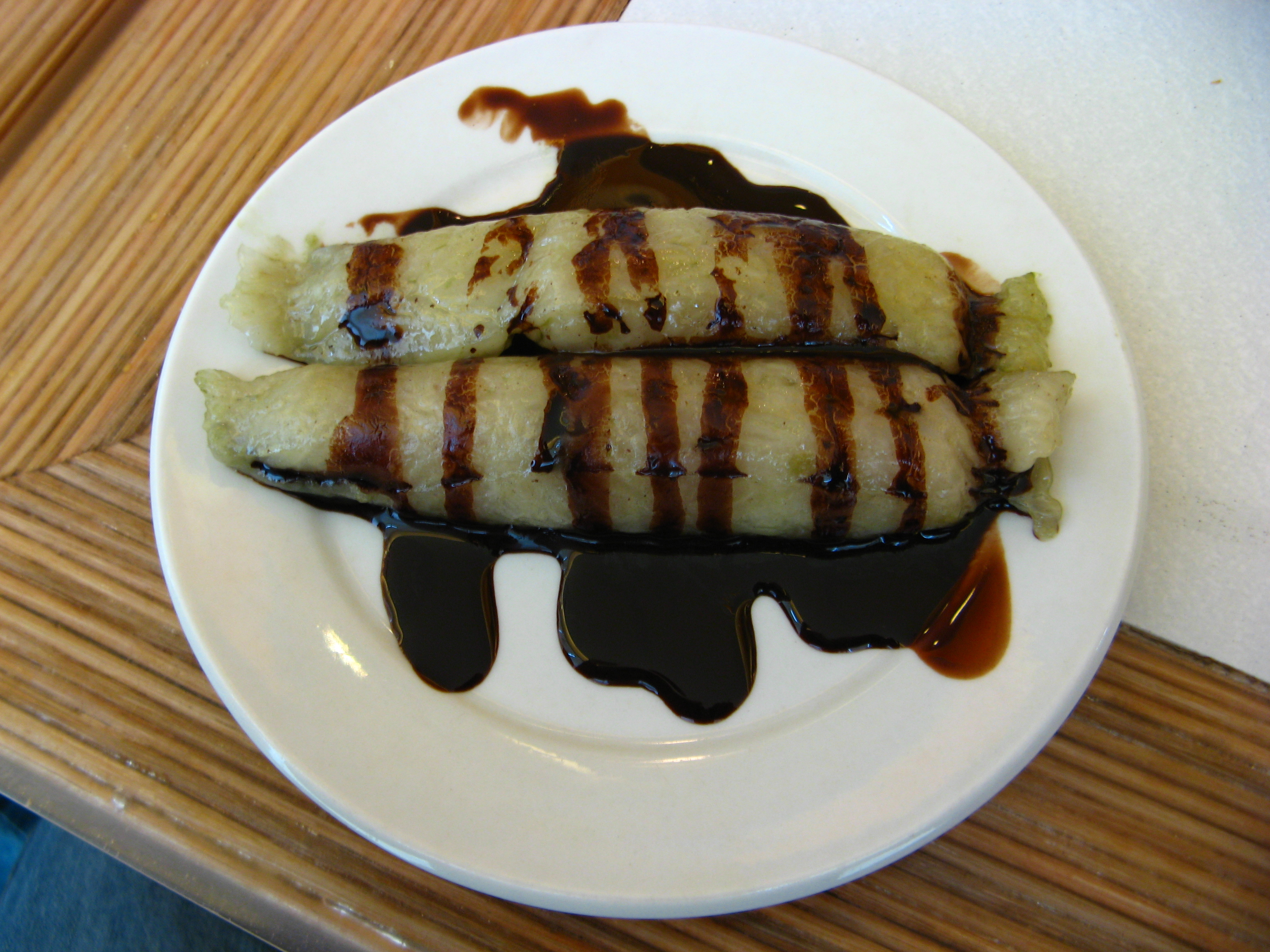
Cassava covered with latik

This is a list of dessert sauces. A dessert sauce is a sauce that serves to add flavor, moisture, texture and color to desserts. Dessert sauces may be cooked or uncooked.

== Dessert sauces ==
- Butterscotch
- Caramel sauce
- Chancaca
- Chocolate gravy
- Chocolate syrup
- Coulis
- Cream
- Crème anglaise
- Custard
- Fruit curd
- Ganache
- Hard sauce – includes brandy butter, rum butter and sherry butter
- Hot fudge
- Latik
- Magic Shell
- Qatir (syrup)
- Rainbow sauce
- Rooh afza - Rose sauce, common in India and Pakistan
- Rumtopf
- Slatko
- Strawberry sauce
- Raspberry sauce
- Wet walnuts

== See also ==
- Ganache
- List of desserts
- List of sauces
