= Crème anglaise =

Light sweetened pouring custard

Crème Anglaise
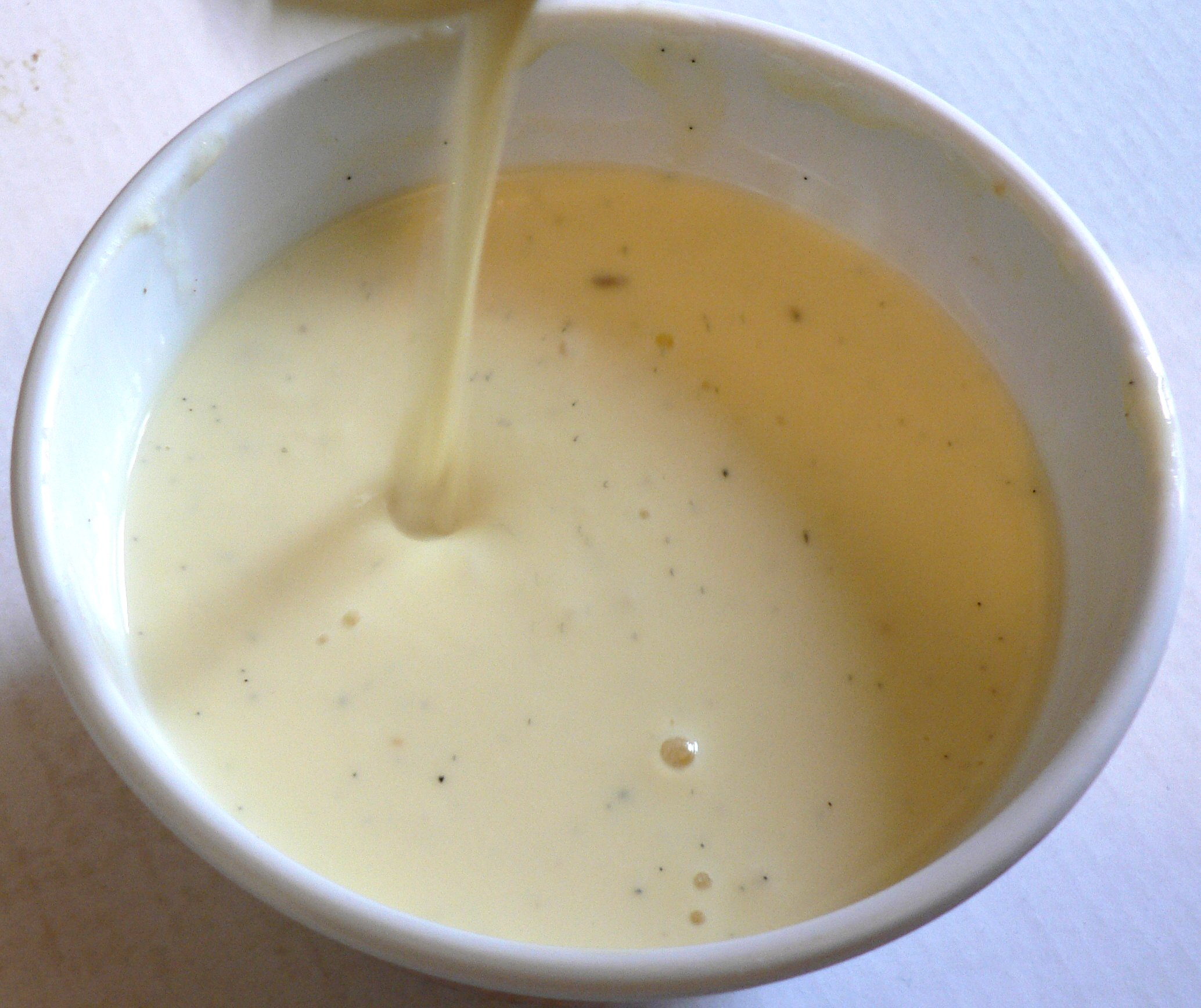
- Crème anglaise with vanilla seeds
- Alternative names: English Cream; Drinking Custard
- Type: Custard
- Place of origin: France
- Main ingredients: Sugar, egg yolks, milk, vanilla

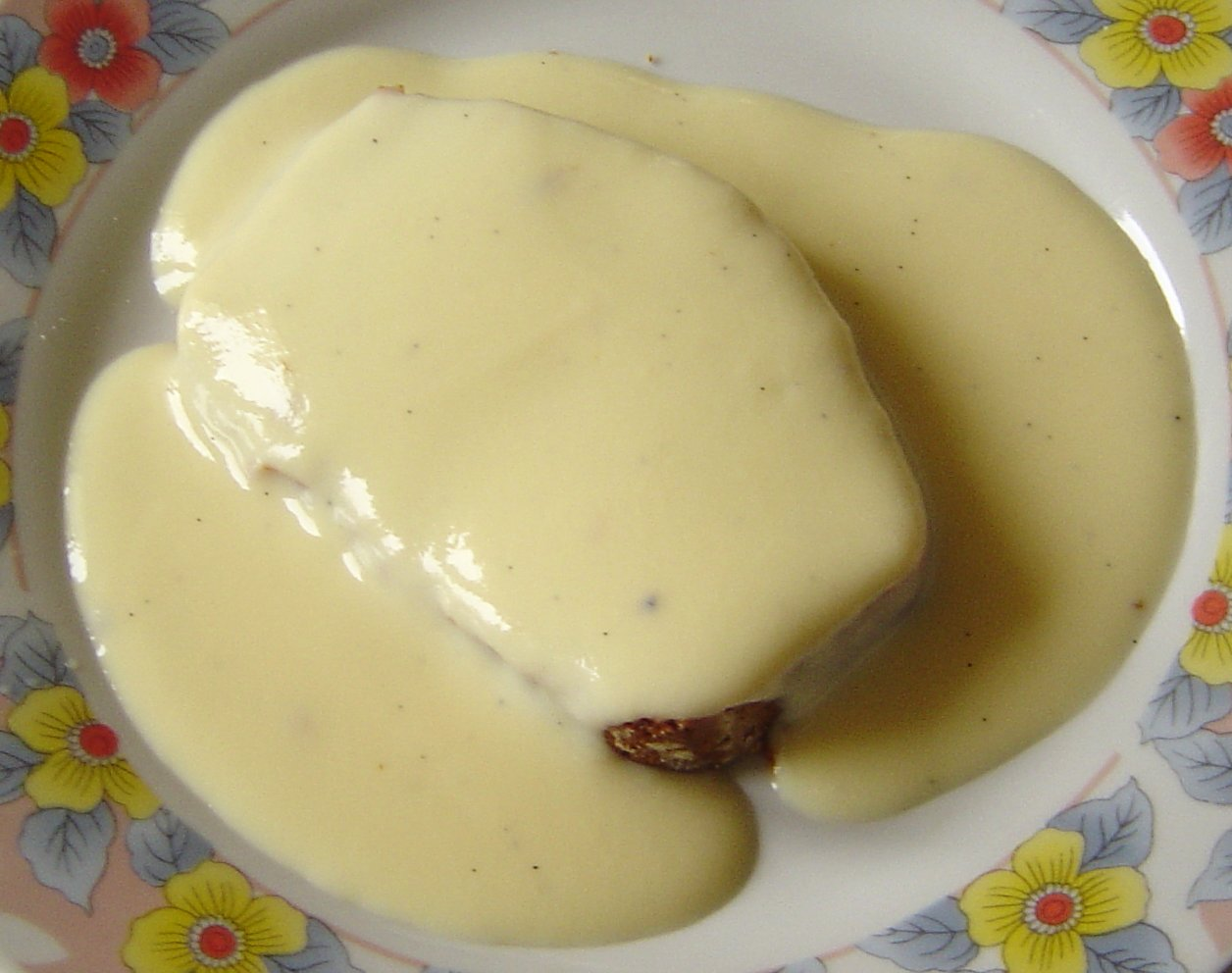
Crème anglaise over a slice of pain d'épices

Crème anglaise (French: [kʁɛm‿ɑ̃glɛz]; French for 'English cream'), custard sauce, pouring custard, or simply custard is a light, sweetened pouring custard from French cuisine, used as a dessert cream or sauce. It is a mix of sugar, egg yolks, and hot milk usually flavoured with vanilla.

Crème anglaise can be poured over cakes or fruits as a sauce or eaten as part of desserts such as floating island. It also serves as a base ingredient for other desserts such as ice cream or crème brûlée.

As a beverage, it is known as "drinking custard" or "boiled custard" in the American South and served like eggnog during the Christmas season. Other names include the French terms crème à l'anglaise ("English-style cream") and crème française ("French cream"). Crème anglaise is relatively high in fat and carbohydrates.

Imitation custard sauce, containing no egg, is often made from instant custard powders such as Bird's Custard.

== See also ==
- List of dessert sauces
- Custard
- Crème brûlée
- Ice cream
