= Dessert sauce =

Sauce used for desserts

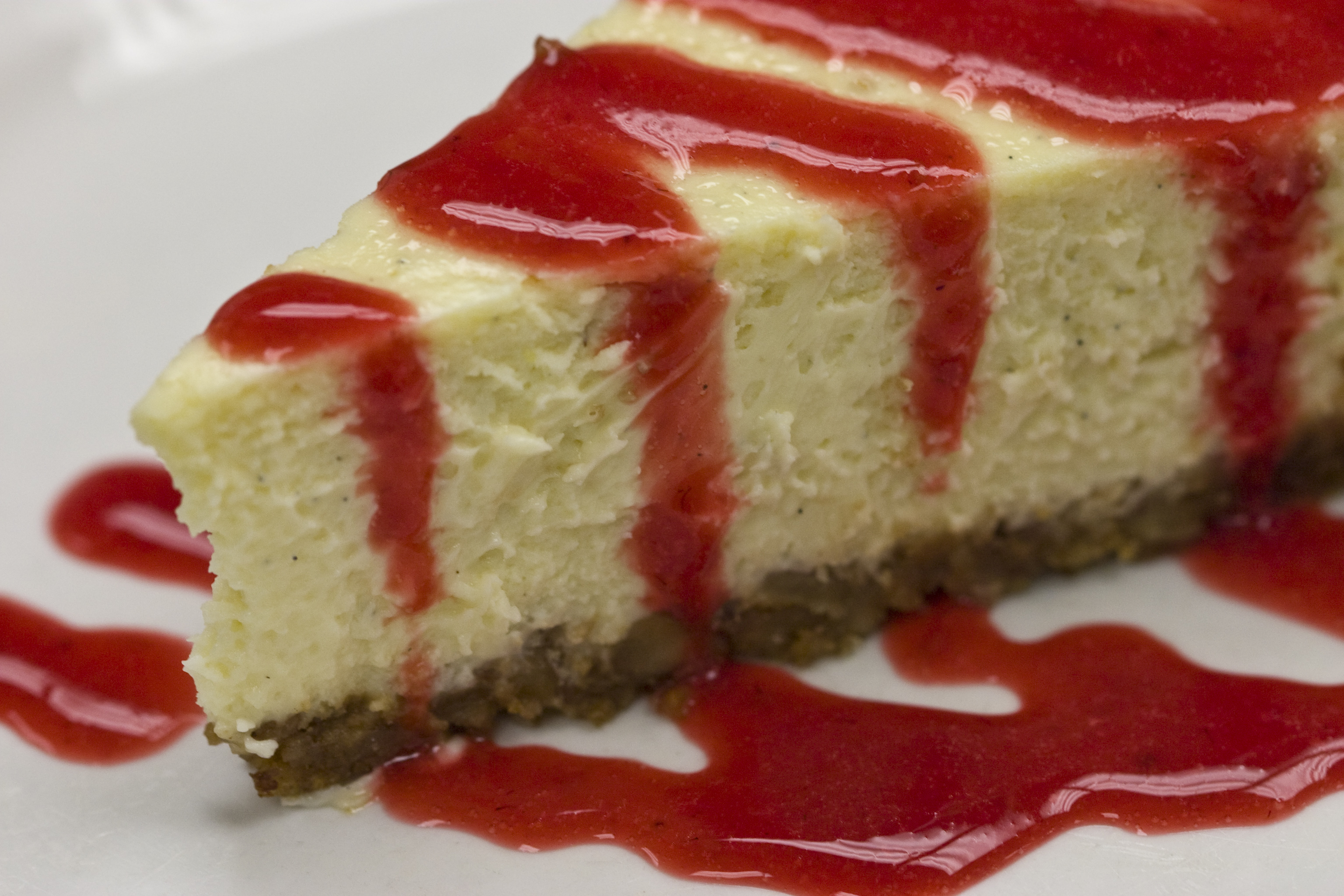
Strawberry sauce atop a slice of cheesecake

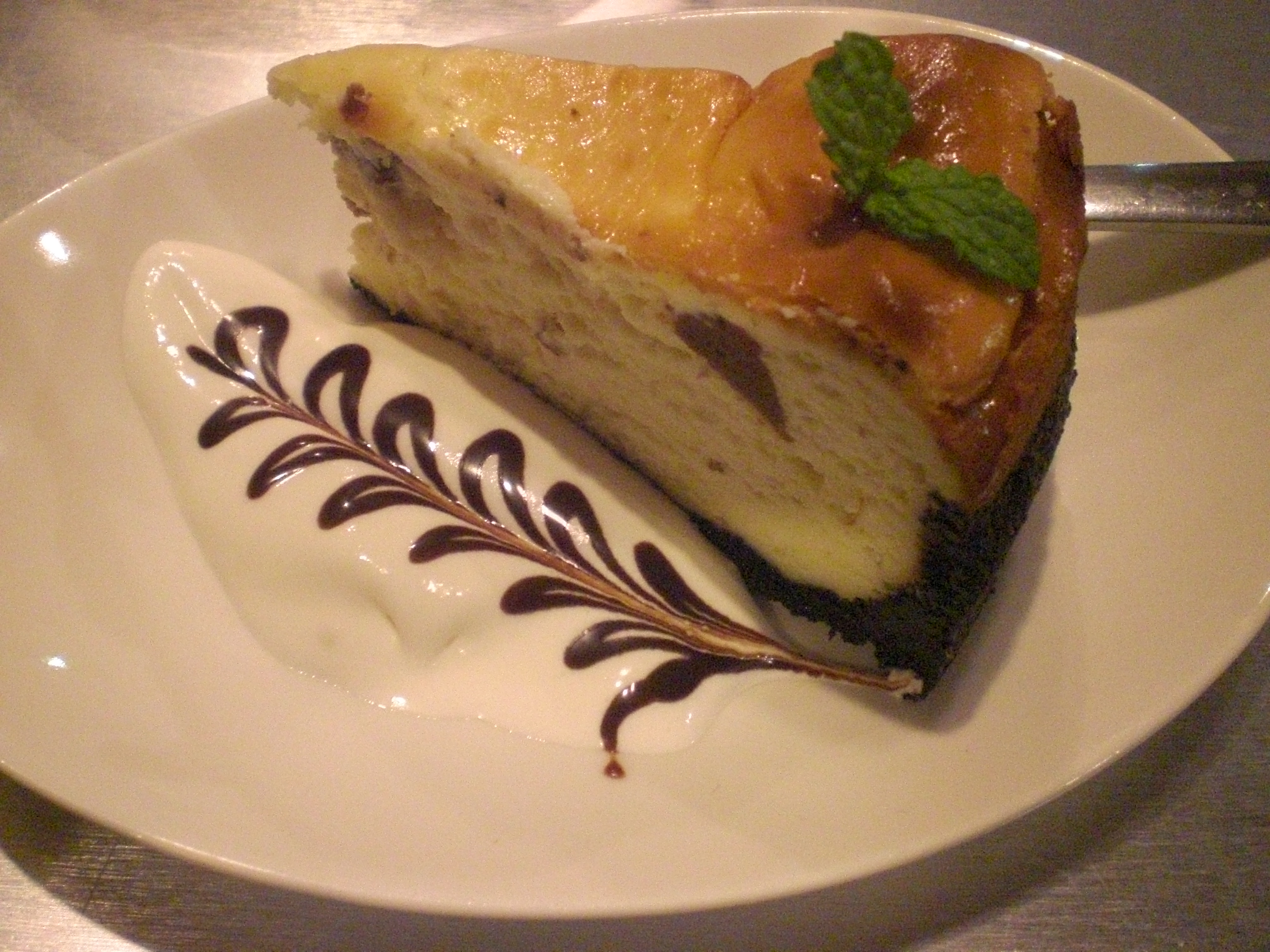
Cheesecake served with a cream and chocolate sauce dessert sauce

A dessert sauce is a sauce used for desserts. It is drizzled or poured atop various desserts, and is also used for plate decoration. Dessert sauce adds flavor, moisture, texture and color to desserts, may be cooked or uncooked, and is sometimes prepared as a hard sauce with the addition of alcoholic beverages. It is used in various manners to add flavor to and enhance the visual presentation of desserts.

== Etymology ==
In French cuisine, dessert sauces are often referred to as crèmes, rather than sauces.

== Overview ==
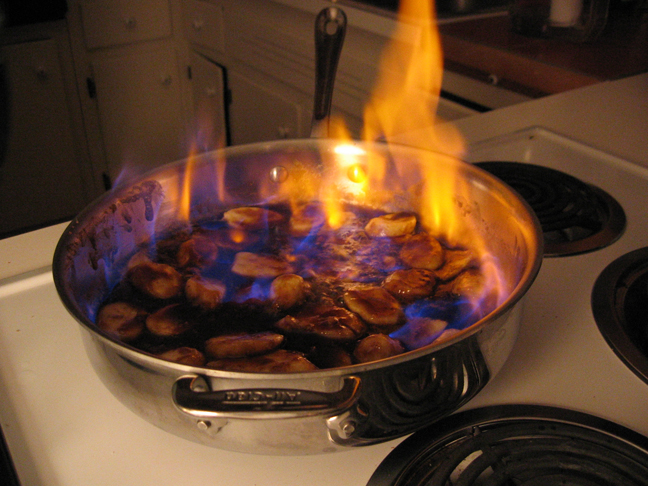
Bananas Foster being flambéed

Dessert sauce is typically drizzled or poured atop various desserts, and may also be drizzled or poured on the plate. Dessert sauce examples include caramel sauce, custard, crème anglaise, chocolate sauce, dulce de leche, fruit sauces such as blueberry sauce, raspberry sauce and strawberry sauce. Raspberry sauce may be strained using a sieve to remove the seeds from the sauce. Dessert sauce adds flavor, moisture, texture, and color to desserts. It may be cooked or uncooked.

Dessert sauce is sometimes prepared as a hard sauce with the addition of alcoholic beverages, such as bourbon, brandy or liqueur. Desserts with hard sauces can be served flambéed because the ethyl alcohol in distilled beverages is flammable. Drops of lemon flavoring may be added to the sauce as a fire accelerant.

== Uses ==
Dessert sauces are used on many desserts such as cake, cheesecake, pound cake, and ice cream. Dry and firm desserts may be enhanced by the use of a dessert sauce that soaks into the dessert, which adds moisture and flavor.

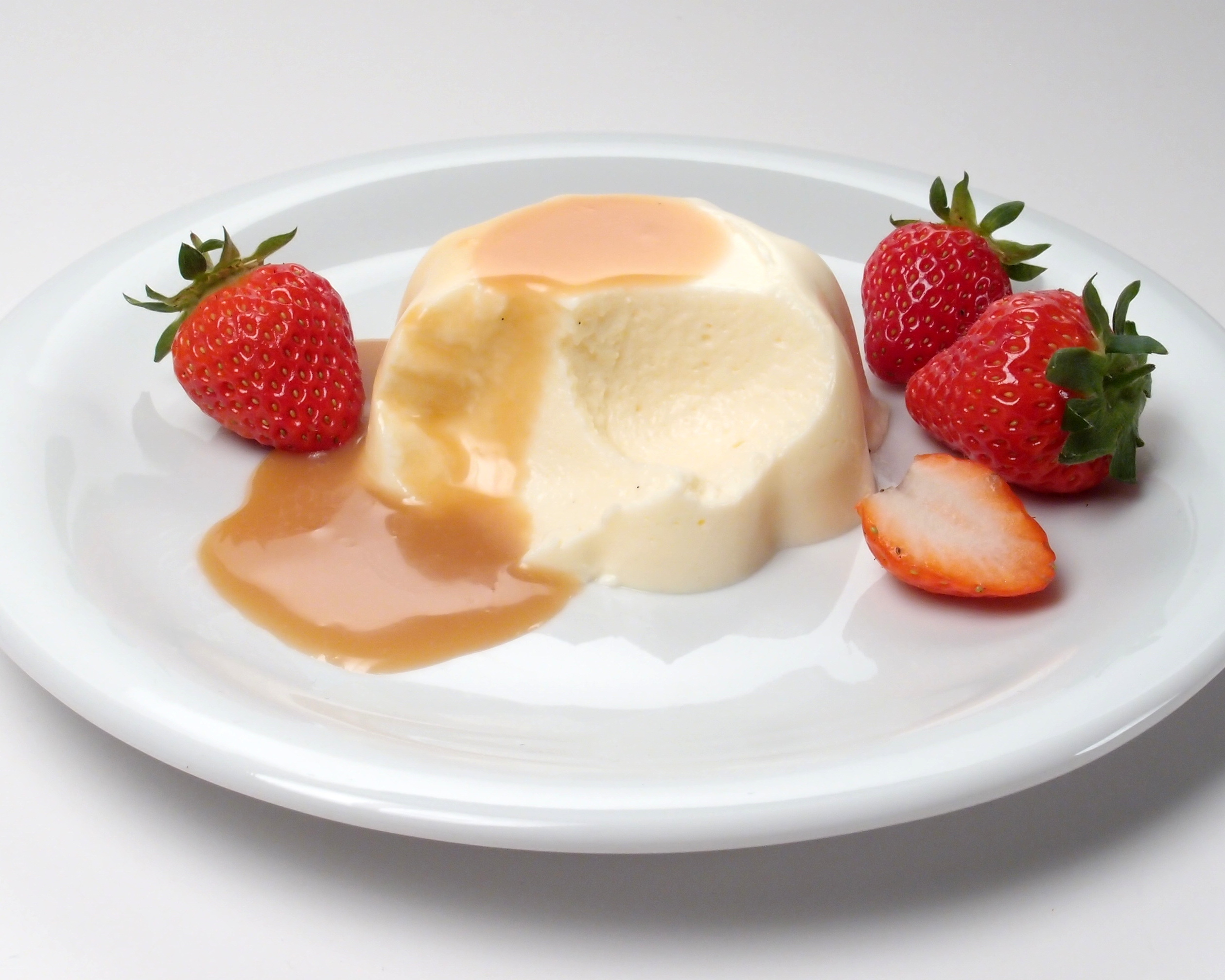
Bavarian cream with caramel sauce and strawberries

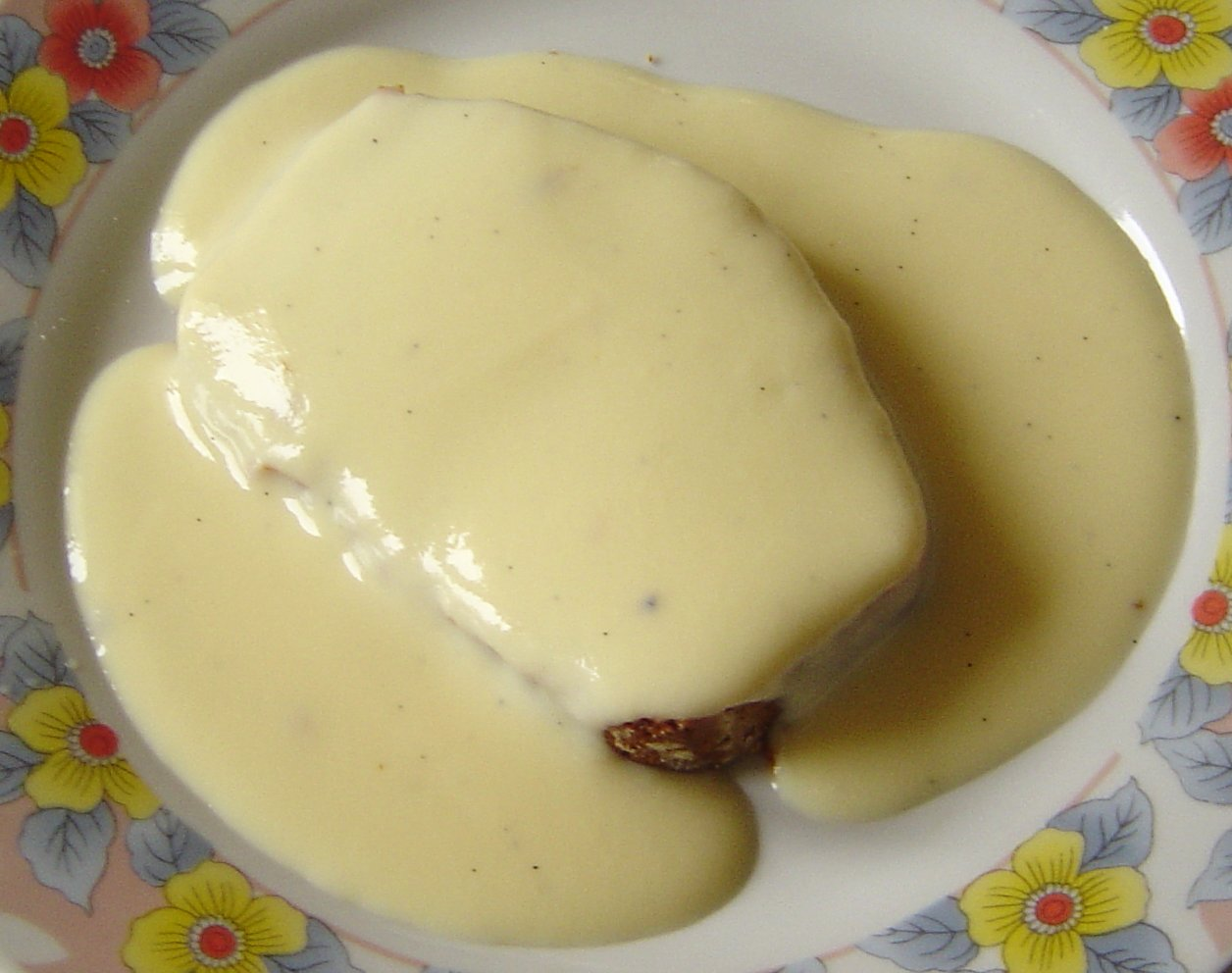
Crème anglaise served atop a slice of pain d'épices and pooled on the plate

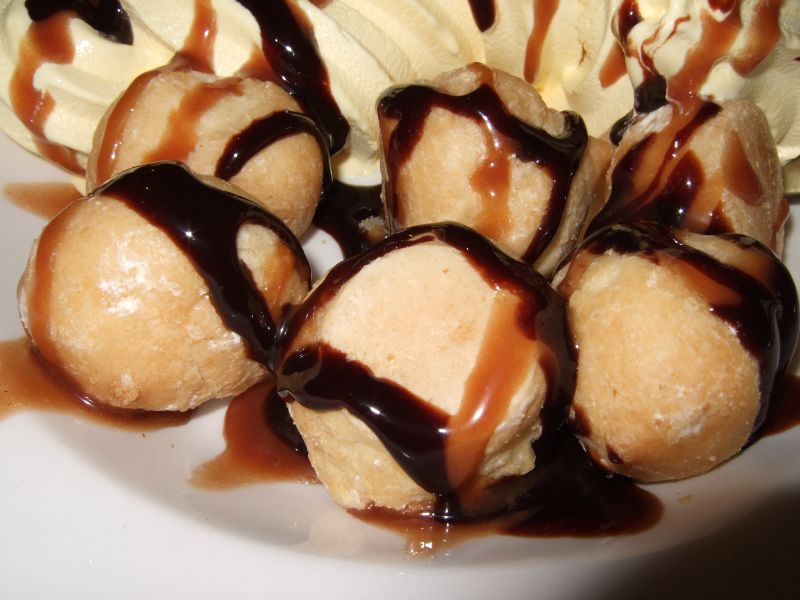
Profiteroles with chocolate and caramel sauces drizzled on them

=== As decoration ===
Dessert sauce can be used to add visual art to desserts, by using the sauce to paint designs and imagery on them. A plastic squeeze bottle full of sauce can be used to aid in decoration. Dessert sauce is also used on plates that desserts are placed upon, and can be arranged in an artistic design. A toothpick or knife can be used to swirl the sauce on plates to create various designs.

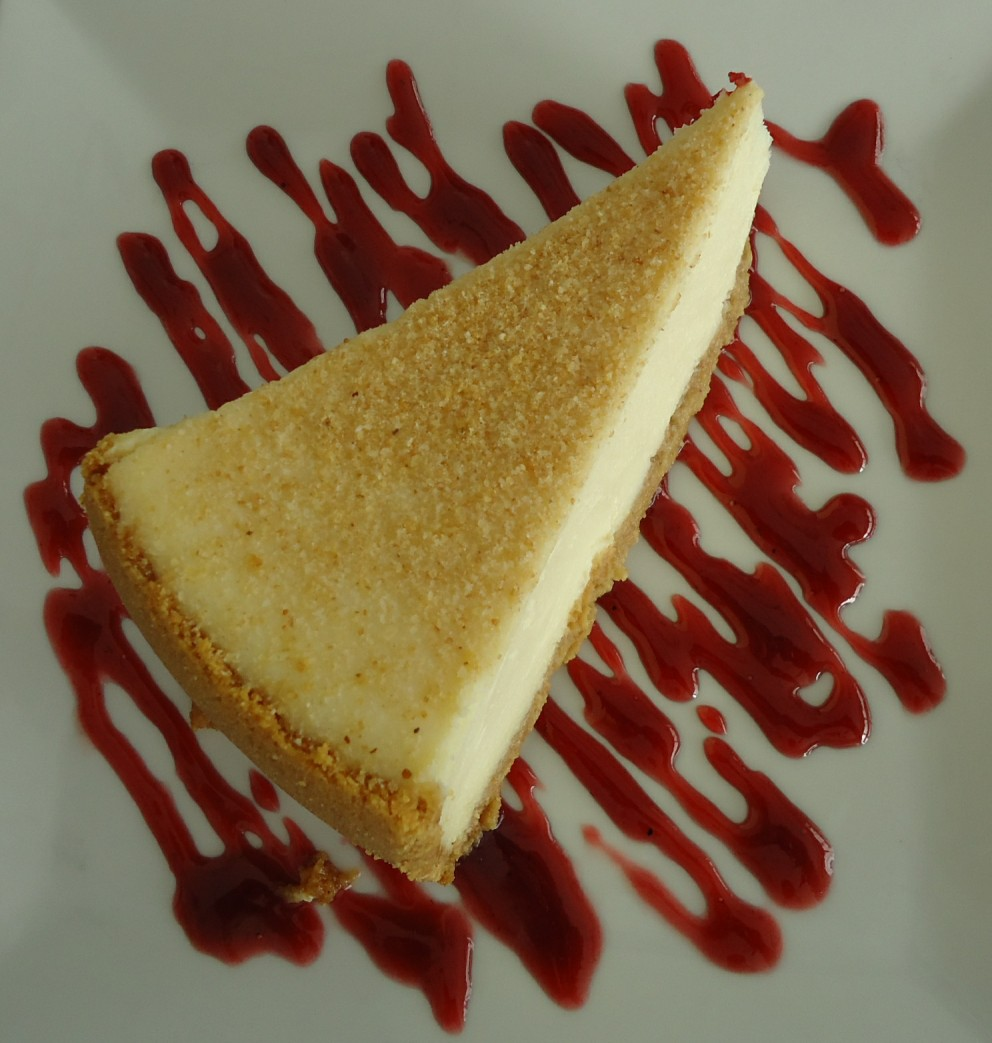
Cheesecake with a dessert sauce on the plate

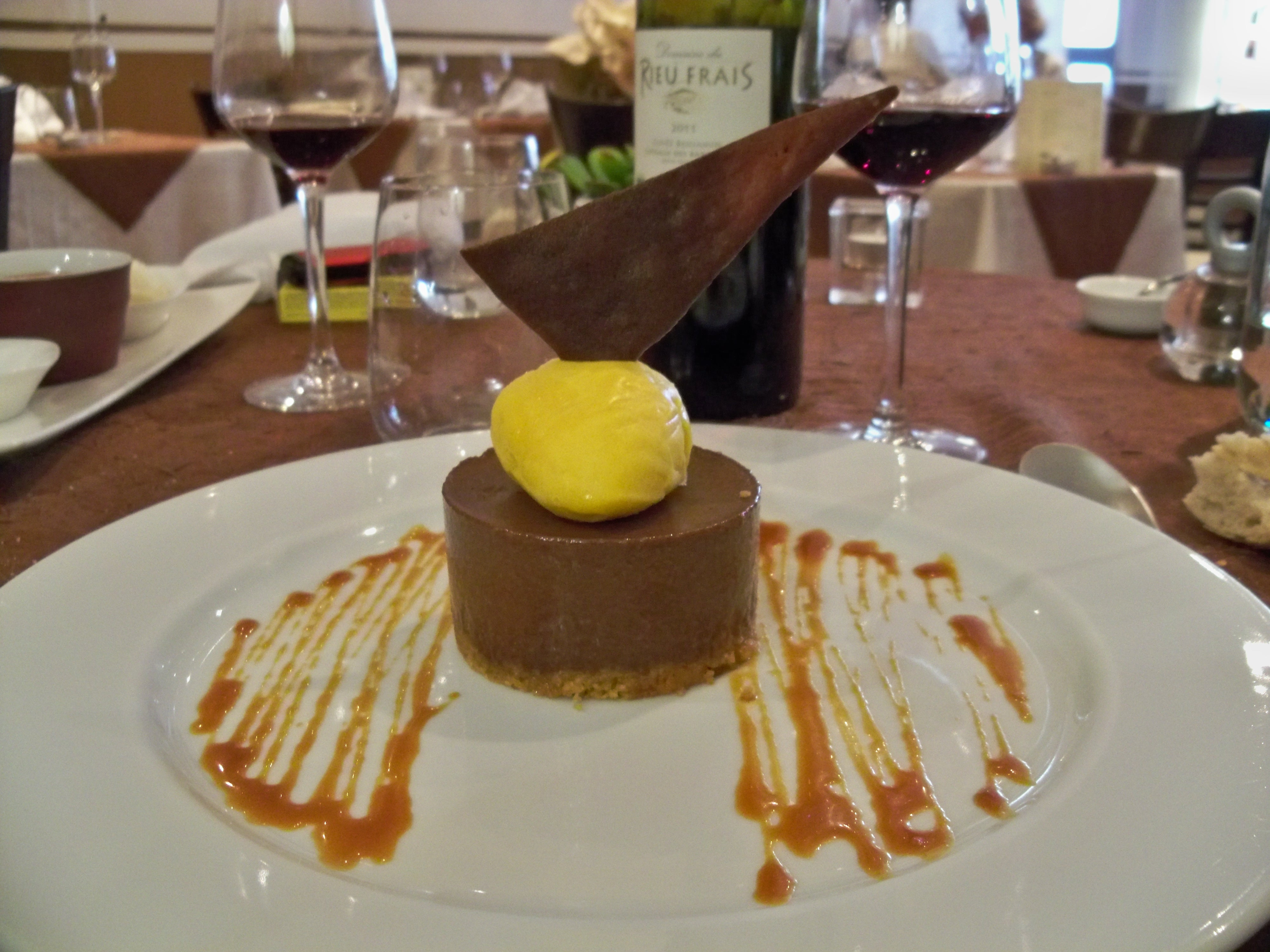
A dessert with a caramel sauce decoration on the plate

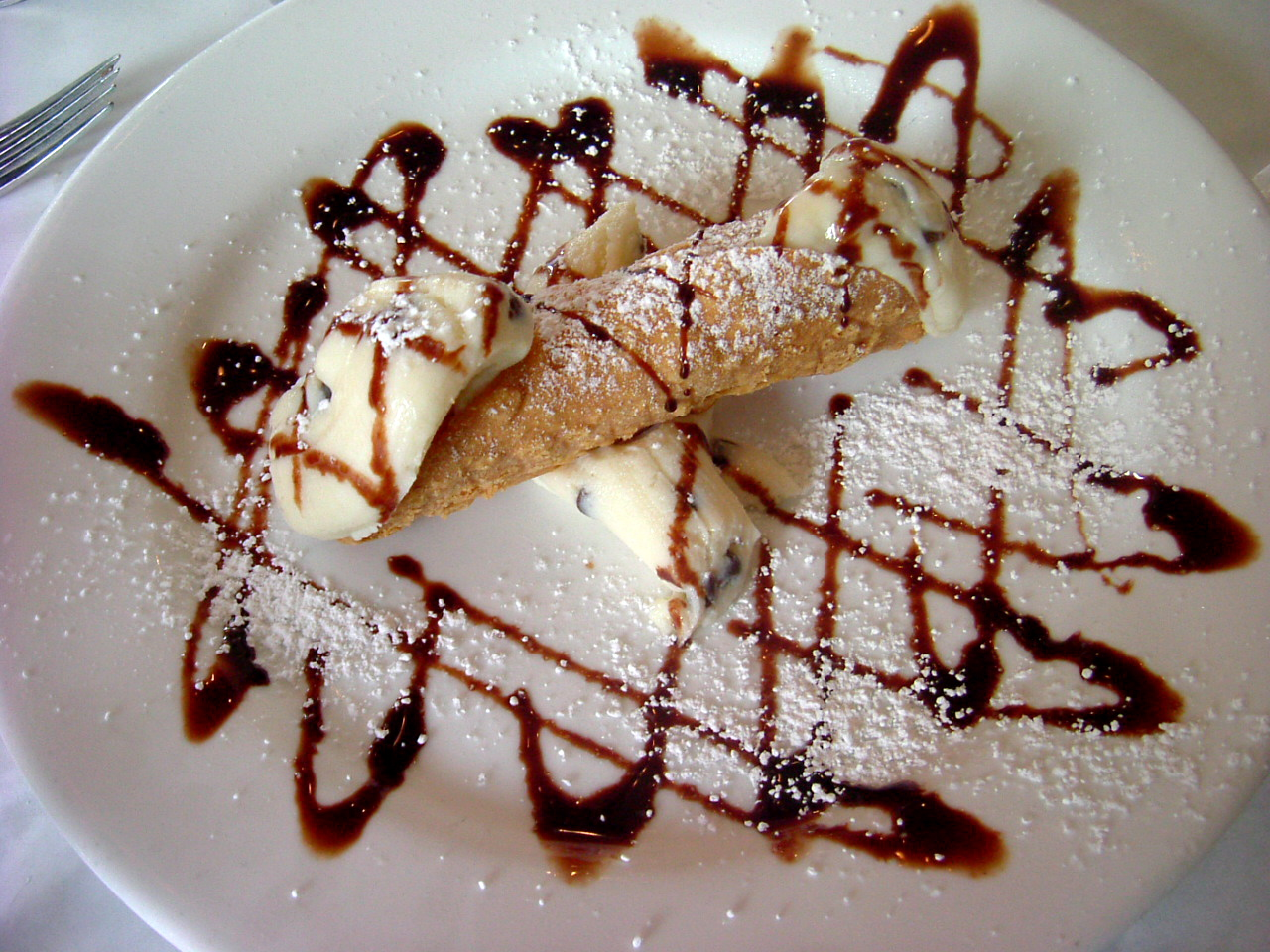
A cannoli with a chocolate sauce decoration

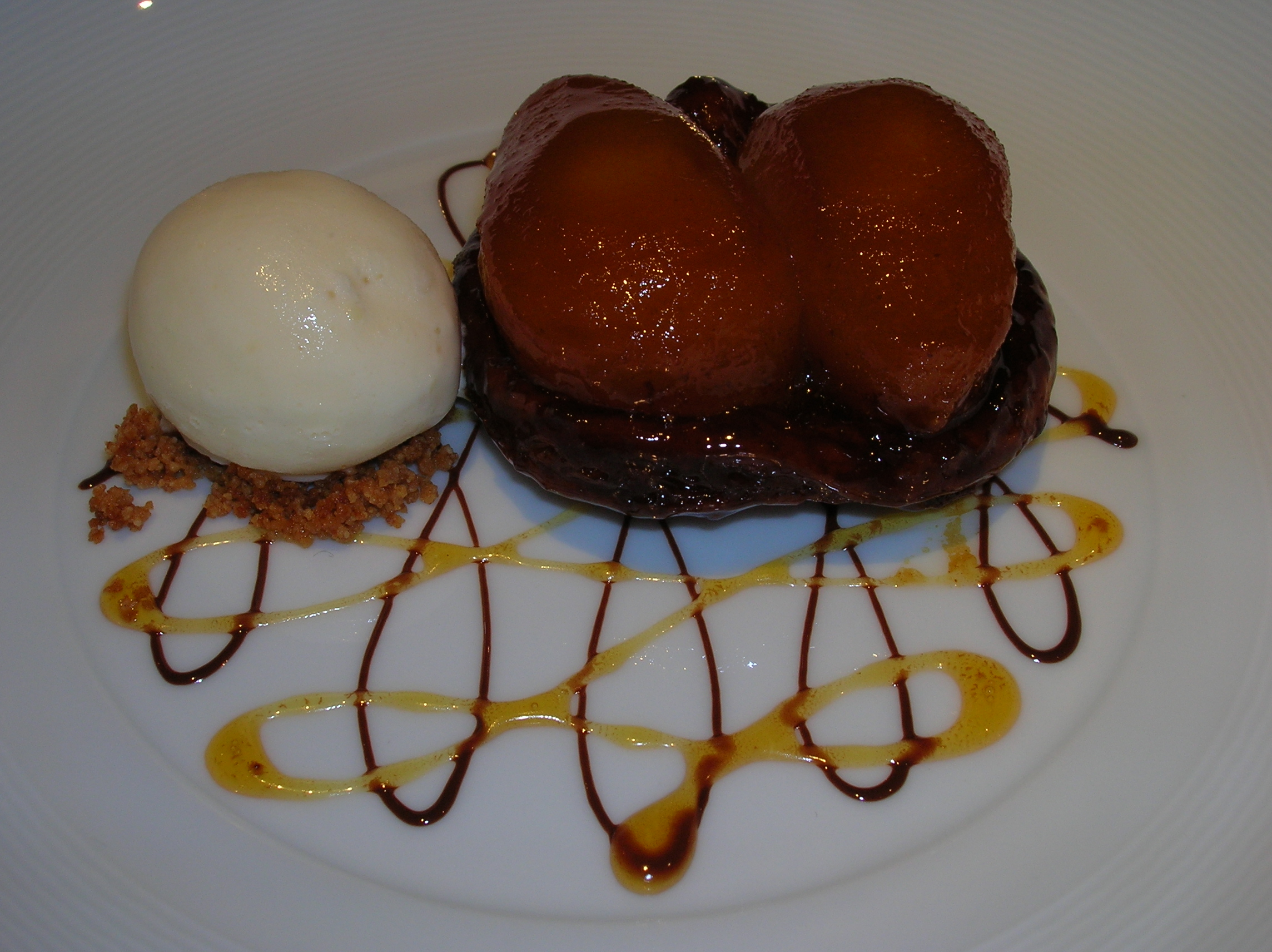
A Tarte Tatin with a chocolate and caramel sauce decoration

== Mass production ==
Some companies mass-produce dessert sauces, such as British Sugar and The Hershey Company, and market them under various brand names. These products are typically available for consumers in grocery stores and supermarkets.

== See also ==
- Cake decorating
- List of dessert sauces
- List of sauces
